= 1951 International Court of Justice judges election =

The 1951 International Court of Justice election took place on 6 December 1951 at the Palais de Chaillot, Paris. This was the third election of Judges of the Court, one the six "principal organs", and the second one to be held in order to fill five (rather than all fifteen) judges' seats. It thus continued the pattern of triennial elections whereby the General Assembly and the Security Council concurrently elect five judges to the Court for nine-year terms, in this case beginning on 6 February 1952.

== Background ==
The International Court of Justice (ICJ), based in The Hague, is one of the principal organs of the United Nations. Also known as the World Court, it adjudicates legal disputes between states, and provides advisory opinions on legal questions submitted by other UN organs or agencies.

The court consists of 15 judges, with five judges elected every three years. (In the case of death or other vacancy, a judge is elected for the remainder of the term.) Judges are required to be independent and impartial; they may not exercise any political or administrative function, and do not act as a representative of their home state.

Elections of members of the Court are governed by articles 2 through 15 of the Statute of the International Court of Justice.

The previous election was held in 1949 and resulted in the following composition of the Court:

Judge	Term starts / renewed	Term ends
Philadelpho Azevedo (Brazil)	1946	1955; died 1951
Isidro Fabela Alfaro (Mexico)	1946	1952
Green Hackworth (United States)	1946	1952
Helge Klæstad (Norway)	1946	1954
(Soviet Union) Sergei Krylov (USSR)	1946	1952
Charles de Visscher (Belgium)	1946	1952
Alejandro Álvarez (Chile)	1946	1955
Jules Basdevant (France)	1946	1955
José Gustavo Guerrero (El Salvador)	1946	1955
Arnold McNair (United Kingdom)	1946	1955
Abdel Hamid Badawi Pasha (Egypt)	1946, 1949	1958
Hsu Mo (China) (Note: At the time, China was represented at the UN by the government of the Taiwan-based Republic of China. For details, see China and the United Nations#Republic of China in the United Nations (1945–1971))	1946, 1949	1958
John Read (Canada)	1946, 1949	1958
Bohdan Winiarski (Poland)	1946, 1949	1958
(Socialist Federal Republic of Yugoslavia) Milovan Zoričić (Yugoslavia)	1946, 1949	1958

Thus, the 1951 election saw the seat of the deceased Judge Azevedo to be filled as an occasional vacancy for the remainder of his term, and the seats of Judges Fabela Alfaro, Hackworth, Klaestad, Krylov and de Visscher were to be contested. Technically, these would constitute two separate elections, with a separate set of candidates nominated, and the procedures regarding rounds of balloting and the number of meetings (see below) separately applied.

== Candidates ==
=== Qualifications ===
Article 2 of the Statute of the International Court of Justice provides that judges shall be elected "from among persons of high moral character, who possess the qualifications required in their respective countries for appointment to the highest judicial offices, or are jurisconsults of recognized competence in international law".

=== Nomination procedure ===
All States parties to the Statute of the ICJ had the right to propose candidates. Nominations of candidates for election to the ICJ are made by a group consisting of the members of the Permanent Court of Arbitration (PCA), designated by that State. For this purpose, members of the PCA act in "national groups" (i.e. all the PCA members from any individual state). (In the case of UN member states not represented in the PCA, the state in question may select up to four individuals to be its "national group" for the purpose of nominating candidates to the ICJ). Every such "national group" may nominate up to four candidates, not more than two of whom shall be of their own nationality. Before making these nominations, each "national group" is recommended to consult its highest court of justice, its legal faculties and schools of law, and its national academies and national sections of international academies devoted to the study of law.

=== 1951 nominees ===
==== For the occasional vacancy ====
The following candidates were nominated for the election in order to fill the seat of the deceased Judge Azevedo of Brazil:

Candidates	Nominating national groups
Hildebrando Pompeu Pinto Accioli (Brazil)	Belgium, France, Luxembourg
Zeki Mesut Alsan (Turkey)	Turkey
Enrique Armand-Ugón (Uruguay)	Cuba, Uruguay
Levi Carneiro (Brazil)	Argentina, Bolivia, Brazil, Chile, China, Cuba, Dominican Republic, Ecuador, Egypt, El Salvador, Guatemala, Haiti, India, Iraq, Liechtenstein, Luxembourg, Netherlands, Panama, Peru, Philippines, Sweden, Switzerland, Thailand, Turkey, United Kingdom, United States, Uruguay
Eduardo Juan Couture (Uruguay)	Honduras
Raul Fernandes (Brazil)	Belgium, France, Netherlands
Arturo García Salazar (Peru)	Peru
Julián López Pineda (Honduras)	Honduras
Massimo Pilotti (Italy)	Switzerland
Benegal Narsing Rau (India)	Egypt

==== For the five regular seats ====
The following candidates were nominated for the election:

Candidates	Nominating national groups
Carlos Leonidas Acevedo (Guatemala)	Guatemala
Ricardo J. Alfaro (Panama)	Guatemala
Zeki Mesut Alsan (Turkey)	Greece
Mariano Argüello Vargas (Nicaragua)	Nicaragua
Enrique Armand-Ugón (Uruguay)	Brazil, Chile, Ecuador, Guatemala, Honduras, Panama, Uruguay
Juan José Carbajal Victorica (Uruguay)	Uruguay
Ernst S.B. Colov (Denmark)	Denmark
Roberto Córdova (Mexico)	Argentina, Chile, China, Honduras, India, Mexico, Netherlands, Panama, Peru, El Salvador, Thailand, United States; withdrew
Ramón Ernesto Cruz Uclés (Honduras)	Honduras
Tomás Manuel Elío (Bolivia)	Bolivia
Isidro Fabela Alfaro (Mexico)	El Salvador (withdrawn)
Abraham Feller (United States)	Philippines
Arturo García Salazar (Peru)	Peru
(Soviet Union) Sergei Alexandrovich Golunsky (USSR)	Byelorussian SSR, Egypt, Ukrainian SSR, USSR
Green Hackworth (United States)	Argentina, Australia, Belgium, Chile, China, Egypt, El Salvador, France, Greece, Liechtenstein, Luxembourg, Netherlands, New Zealand, Norway, Panama, Peru, Sweden, United Kingdom, United States, Uruguay, Yugoslavia
Helge Klæstad (Norway)	Argentina, Australia, Belgium, Brazil, Denmark, Egypt, El Salvador, France, Liechtenstein, Luxembourg, New Zealand, Norway, Switzerland, Thailand, Turkey, United Kingdom, United States, Uruguay, Yugoslavia
Eelco van Kleffens (Netherlands)	Brazil, Luxembourg
(Soviet Union) Sergei Borisovich Krylov (USSR)	Belgium, Egypt (withdrawn), France, Liechtenstein, Norway, Sweden, Switzerland; withdrew
Silverio Laínez (Honduras)	Honduras
Juan Bautista de Lavalle y García (Peru)	Peru
Gustavo Manzanares Fernandez (Nicaragua)	Nicaragua
(Post-independence Burma (1948–1962)) E.Maung (Burma)	Burma
Ricardo Paras (Philippines)	Philippines
Miguel Prado Solares (Guatemala)	Guatemala
Seni Pramoj (Thailand)	Thailand
Abdur Rahman (Pakistan)	Pakistan
Benegal Narsing Rau (India)	Argentina, Australia, Brazil, Chile, Ecuador, India, Netherlands, New Zealand, Sweden, United Kingdom, Yugoslavia
Casto Rojas (Bolivia)	Bolivia
Emil Sandström (Sweden)	Denmark, Sweden
Jean Spiropoulos (Greece)	Greece, Turkey
Vilhelm Topsøe-Jensen (Denmark)	Denmark
José Vicente Trujillo (Ecuador)	Ecuador
Pedro Tuason (Philippines)	Philippines
Jan Hendrik Willem Verzijl (Netherlands)	Netherlands
Charles de Visscher (Belgium)	Australia, Belgium, China, Egypt, El Salvador, France, Greece, Liechtenstein, Luxembourg, New Zealand, Norway, Panama, Switzerland, Turkey, United Kingdom, United States, Yugoslavia
Homero Viteri Lafronte (Ecuador)	Ecuador

== Election procedure ==
The General Assembly and the Security Council proceed, independently of one another, to elect five members of the Court (or one member, if the election is held in order to fill an occasional vacancy).

To be elected, a candidate must obtain an absolute majority of votes both in the General Assembly and in the Security Council. At the time, 32 votes constituted an absolute majority in the General Assembly and 6 votes constituted an absolute majority in the Security Council (with no distinction being made between permanent and non-permanent members of the Security Council).

When five candidates have obtained the required majority in one of the organs, the president of that organ notifies the president of the other organ of the names of the five candidates. The president of the latter does not communicate such names to the members of that organ until that organ itself has given five candidates the required majority of votes.

After both the General Assembly and the Security Council have produced a list of five names that received an absolute majority of the votes, the two lists are compared. Any candidate appearing on both lists is elected. But if fewer than five candidates have been thus elected, the two organs proceed, again independently of one another, at a second meeting and, if necessary, a third meeting to elect candidates by further ballots for seats remaining vacant, the results again being compared after the required number of candidates have obtained an absolute majority in each organ.

If after the third meeting, one or more seats still remain unfilled, the General Assembly and the Security Council may form a joint conference consisting of six members, three appointed by each organ, in order to elect a candidate to fill the remaining seat(s). This option had never been used prior to the 1951 elections, and would never be used up to now.

== Results ==
=== Filling the occasional vacancy ===
Candidates that did not receive a single vote in either the General Assembly or the Security Council are not listed.

Candidates	General Assembly majority = 32	Security Council majority = 6
Levi Carneiro (Brazil)	60	11
Enrique Armand-Ugón (Uruguay)	1	0
Hildebrando Pompeu Pinto Accioli (Brazil)	1	0

Levi Carneiro was thus almost unanimously elected to fill the seat that became vacant due to the death of his compatriot Judge Azevedo. This set the tradition of occasional vacancies being filled by judges of the same nationality as the judge having died or resigned. The tradition has been followed since then, with very few exceptions.

=== Filling regular seats ===
Candidates that did not receive a single vote in either the General Assembly or the Security Council are not listed.

Candidates	General Assembly majority = 32			Security Council majority = 6	
	R1	R2	R3	R1	R2
Ricardo J. Alfaro (Panama)	0	2	-	0	0
Zeki Mesut Alsan (Turkey)	1	1	-	1	0
Enrique Armand-Ugón (Uruguay)	41	-	-	7	9
Tomás Manuel Elío (Bolivia)	1	0	-	0	0
Abraham Feller (United States)	2	0	-	0	0
(Soviet Union) Sergei Alexandrovich Golunsky (USSR)	41	-	-	9	7
Green Hackworth (United States)	43	-	-	11	9
Helge Klæstad (Norway)	29	29	43	8	9
Eelco van Kleffens (Netherlands)	4	0	-	1	0
Silverio Laínez (Honduras)	1	0	-	0	0
(Post-independence Burma (1948–1962)) E.Maung (Burma)	12	7	-	1	0
Ricardo Paras (Philippines)	15	5	-	2	1
Miguel Prado Solares (Guatemala)	1	0	-	0	0
Seni Pramoj (Thailand)	2	0	-	0	0
Abdur Rahman (Pakistan)	3	0	-	0	0
Benegal Narsing Rau (India)	32	-	-	7	8
Casto Rojas (Bolivia)	1	0	-	0	0
Emil Sandström (Sweden)	0	1	-	0	0
Jean Spiropoulos (Greece)	2	0	-	1	0
Vilhelm Topsøe-Jensen (Denmark)	1	0	-	0	0
Pedro Tuason (Philippines)	1	1	-	0	0
Charles de Visscher (Belgium)	22	15	15	7	4
Homero Viteri Lafronte (Ecuador)	1	0	-	0	

In the General Assembly, four candidates, Messrs Hackworth, Armand-Ugón, Golunsky and Rau, received an absolute majority after the first round of voting. The Assembly then proceeded to select the fifth candidate to be included on its list, before it being compared with the list of the Security Council. After the second ballot was inconclusive, the chairman recalled a rule of procedure that provided for the next round of voting to be limited to two candidates with the highest number of votes. The third round was thus restricted to Mr Klaestad and Mr de Visscher. Mr Klaestad received the required majority.

In the Security Council, 6 candidates obtained an absolute majority of votes in the first round, of whom three candidates received 7 votes and three other candidates received more than 7 votes. A discussion then ensued as to whether the next round of voting should be an open-ended one or whether it should be limited to selecting 2 out of 3 candidates who had received 7 votes, with the other three considered as already having been selected. It was decided that an open-ended vote should be taken. Five candidates received an absolute majority in the second round.

As the two lists thus produced contained the same five candidates, those candidates were declared elected to the Court, without a need for further rounds of voting.

== Aftermath ==
The composition of the Court following the election was as follows:

Judge	Term starts / renewed	Term ends
Alejandro Álvarez (Chile)	1946	1955
Jules Basdevant (France)	1946	1955
José Gustavo Guerrero (El Salvador)	1946	1955
Arnold McNair (United Kingdom)	1946	1955
Levi Carneiro (Brazil)	1952 (Note: Elected to fill an occasional vacancy)	1955
Abdel Hamid Badawi Pasha (Egypt)	1946, 1949	1958
Hsu Mo (China)	1946, 1949	1958
John Read (Canada)	1946, 1949	1958
Bohdan Winiarski (Poland)	1946, 1949	1958
(Socialist Federal Republic of Yugoslavia) Milovan Zoričić (Yugoslavia)	1946, 1949	1958
Enrique Armand-Ugón (Uruguay)	1952	1961
Green Hackworth (United States)	1946, 1952	1961
Helge Klæstad (Norway)	1946, 1952	1961
(Soviet Union) Sergei Alexandrovich Golunsky (USSR)	1952	1961
Benegal Narsing Rau (India)	1952	1961

The seats of Judges Álvarez, Basdevant, Guerrero, McNair and Carneiro were to be contested at the 1954 election.
