= 1946 International Court of Justice judges election =

The 1946 International Court of Justice election took place on 6 February 1946 in Westminster Central Hall, London. This was the first ever election of Judges of the Court, one of the six "principal organs" of the newly created United Nations. All 15 seats were to be filled.

== Candidates ==
The following candidates were nominated for the election:

Candidates	Nominating national groups
Hildebrando Accioly (Brazil)	Brazil
Eduardo Blanco Acevedo (Uruguay)	Uruguay
Mostafa Adl (Iran)	Iran
Nasrat al-Farisi (Iraq)	Iraq
Fares al-Khoury (Syria)	Syria, Iraq
Tawfiq al-Suwaidi (Iraq)	Iraq
Rafael Altamira (Spain)	France
Alejandro Álvarez (Chile)	Brazil, Chile, Colombia, Ecuador, Guatemala, Uruguay
Luis Anderson (Costa Rica)	Costa Rica, Guatemala, Honduras, Peru
Philadelpho Azevedo (Brazil)	Brazil, Canada, Chile, Haiti, Lebanon, Paraguay
Abdel Hamid Badawi Pasha (Egypt)	Egypt, Iraq, Lebanon, Saudi Arabia, Syria
Kenneth Hamilton Bailey (Australia)	Australia
Alfredo Baquerizo Moreno (Ecuador)	Ecuador
Jules Basdevant (France)	Belgium, Canada, France, Greece, Luxembourg, United States
Octavio Béeche Argüello (Costa Rica)	Costa Rica
Cemil Bilsel (Turkey)	Turkey
James Leslie Brierly (United Kingdom)	Ethiopia
Antonio Sánchez de Bustamante y Sirven (Cuba)	Cuba, El Salvador, Honduras, Panama
Julián Ríos Cáceres (Honduras)	Honduras
Choucri Cardahi (Lebanon)	Lebanon
Victor Cauvin (Haiti)	Haiti
Cheng Tien-Hsi (China)	Netherlands
Miguel Cruchaga Tocornal (Chile)	El Salvador
Ahmad Matin-Daftari (Iran)	Iran, Lebanon
Reginald Percy Basil Davis (South Africa)	South Africa
Francisco Delgado (Philippines)	Philippines
Eduardo Díez de Medina (Bolivia)	El Salvador
Isidro Fabela Alfaro (Mexico)	Bolivia, Chile, Colombia, Costa Rica, Cuba, Dominican Republic, Ecuador, Haiti, Mexico, Nicaragua, Panama, Paraguay, Uruguay
Vladimír Fajnor (Czechoslovakia)	Czechoslovakia, Ukrainian SSR
Jose Falla Aris (Guatemala)	Guatemala (withdrawn)
Charles Fenwick (United States)	Venezuela
Manuel Gallego (Philippines)	Philippines (withdrawn)
Arturo García Salazar (Peru)	Peru
José Gustavo Guerrero (El Salvador)	Australia, Cuba, El Salvador, Guatemala, Nicaragua
Green Hackworth (United States)	Nicaragua, Turkey, United States
Francois Petrus van den Heever (South Africa)	South Africa (withdrawn)
Hsu Mo (China)	China, Philippines
Manley Hudson (United States)	Argentina, Canada, Chile, Dominican Republic, Ethiopia, Panama, Philippines
Cecil Hurst (United Kingdom)	France, Greece
Salih Jabr (Iraq)	Iraq (withdrawn)
Mariano Honrade de Joya (Philippines)	Philippines
Helge Klæstad (Norway)	Australia, Denmark, Netherlands, New Zealand, Norway
(Socialist Federal Republic of Yugoslavia) Mihailo Konstantinović (Yugoslavia)	Byelorussian SSR, Czechoslovakia, Yugoslavia
(Ukrainian Soviet Socialist Republic) Vladimir Mikhailovich Koretsky (Ukrainian SSR) (Note: The Ukrainian SSR and the Byelorussian SSR, constituent republics of the Soviet Union, enjoyed UN membership in their own right)	Ukrainian SSR
Jan Krčmář (Czechoslovakia)	Czechoslovakia
(Soviet Union) Sergei Borisovich Krylov (USSR)	Poland, USSR
Jerzy Langrod (Poland)	Poland, Ukrainian SSR, USSR
Abel Leger (Haiti)	Haiti
Arturo Logroño (Dominican Republic)	Dominican Republic
Julián López Pineda (Honduras)	Honduras
Carlos Lozano y Lozano (Colombia)	Bolivia, Brazil, Colombia, Costa Rica, Guatemala, Panama, Paraguay, Peru, Venezuela
Arnold McNair (United Kingdom)	Argentina, Australia, Belgium, New Zealand, Turkey, United Kingdom
George Maridakis (Greece)	Greece
Martín C. Martínez (Uruguay)	Uruguay
Michael Myers (New Zealand)	New Zealand
Caracciolo Parra Pérez (Venezuela)	Venezuela, United States
(Soviet Union) Ivan Sergeyevich Peretersky (USSR)	USSR
Néstor Luis Pérez (Venezuela)	Venezuela
Massimo Pilotti (Italy)	France
Luis Podestá Costa (Argentina)	Argentina
(Byelorussian Soviet Socialist Republic) Nikolai Nikolayevich Polyansky (Byelorussian SSR)	Byelorussian SSR
Miguel Prado Solares (Guatemala)	Guatemala (withdrawn)
John Erskine Read (Canada)	Canada
Julio Salmón (Bolivia)	Bolivia
Muammer Raşit Seviğ (Turkey)	Turkey
Jean Spiropoulos (Greece)	Greece, United States
José Luis Tamayo (Ecuador)	Ecuador
Cosme de la Torriente (Cuba)	Cuba
Manuel de Jesus Troncoso de la Concha (Dominican Republic)	Dominican Republic
José Macedonio Urquidi (Bolivia)	Bolivia
Francisco José Urrutia (Colombia)	Colombia
Celso Ramon Velázquez (Paraguay)	Paraguay
Jan Hendrik Willem Verzijl (Netherlands)	Belgium, Luxembourg, Netherlands
Manuel Vicente Villarán (Peru)	Peru
Charles de Visscher (Belgium)	Argentina, Belgium, Ethiopia, Luxembourg, Netherlands, New Zealand, United Kingdom
Bohdan Winiarski (Poland)	Poland
Muhammad Zafarullah Khan (India)	India, United Kingdom
Maximo Zepeda (Nicaragua)	Nicaragua
(Socialist Federal Republic of Yugoslavia) Milovan Zoričić (Yugoslavia)	Ukrainian SSR, United Kingdom, USSR, Yugoslavia
Youssef Zulficar Pasha (Egypt)	Egypt, Iraq (withdrawn), Saudi Arabia, Syria

== Election procedure ==
As the 1946 election was the first of its kind, some aspects of the rules of procedure were yet to be finalized.

According to the Statute, ICJ judges are elected through parallel procedures at the General Assembly and the Security Council. To be elected, a candidate must obtain an absolute majority of votes both in the General Assembly and in the Security Council.

At the time, 26 votes constituted an absolute majority in the General Assembly and 6 votes constituted an absolute majority in the Security Council (with no distinction being made between permanent and non-permanent members of the Security Council).

== Results ==
=== Vote 1 ===
Candidates	General Assembly majority = 26	Security Council majority = 6
(Brazil) Hildebrando Accioly (Note: Accioly, Cheng and van den Heever were still listed on the revised list of candidates distributed on 24 January. A footnote for Cheng stated that he had written he would "not be able to accept a position as judge" of the court. A footnote for van den Heever stated that his nomination had been withdrawn by the national group of South Africa. All three appeared on the printed ballots. The president of the General Assembly announced that they "do not desire a seat" on the court, whereas the president of the Security Council announced that their "nominations [...] have been withdrawn".)	withdrawn	
(Uruguay) Eduardo Blanco Acevedo	6	1
(Iran) Mostafa Adl	13	1
(Iraq) Nasrat al-Farisi	2	0
(Syria) Fares al-Khoury	2	0
(Spain) Rafael Altamira	9	1
(Chile) Alejandro Álvarez	31	7
(Costa Rica) Luis Anderson	9	1
(Brazil) Philadelpho Azevedo	31	9
(Egypt) Abdel Hamid Badawi Pasha	30	10
(Australia) Kenneth Hamilton Bailey	18	6
(Ecuador) Alfredo Baquerizo Moreno	0	0
(France) Jules Basdevant	39	10
(Costa Rica) Octavio Béeche Argüello	1	0
(Turkey) Cemil Bilsel	6	0
(United Kingdom) James Leslie Brierly	0	0
(Cuba) Antonio Sánchez de Bustamante y Sirven	6	0
(Honduras) Julián Ríos Cáceres	9	0
(Lebanon) Choucri Cardahi	0	0
(Haiti) Victor Cauvin	2	0
(China) Cheng Tien-Hsi	withdrawn	
(Chile) Miguel Cruchaga Tocornal	0	0
(Iran) Ahmad Matin-Daftari	0	0
(South Africa) Reginald Percy Basil Davis	8	1
(Philippines) Francisco Delgado	13	0
(Bolivia) Eduardo Díez de Medina	0	0
(Mexico) Isidro Fabela Alfaro	33	8
(Czechoslovakia) Vladimír Fajnor	1	0
(Guatemala) Jose Falla Aris (Note: Falla Aris, Gallego, Jabr and Prado Solares were listed neither on the revised list of candidates distributed on 24 January nor on the ballots, as their only nomination (by their own country's national group) had been withdrawn.)	withdrawn	
(United States) Charles Fenwick	0	0
(Philippines) Manuel Gallego	withdrawn	
(Peru) Arturo García Salazar	0	0
(El Salvador) José Gustavo Guerrero	34	6
(United States) Green Hackworth	32	8
(South Africa) Francois Petrus van den Heever	1 (Note: Van den Heever received a vote in the General Assembly despite the president's announcement that he did not "desire a seat".)	0
(China) Hsu Mo	41	11
(United States) Manley Hudson	10	1
(United Kingdom) Cecil Hurst	2	0
(Iraq) Salih Jabr	withdrawn	
(Philippines) Mariano Honrade de Joya	2	1
(Norway) Helge Klæstad	21	6
(Socialist Federal Republic of Yugoslavia) Mihailo Konstantinović	4	0
(Ukrainian Soviet Socialist Republic) Vladimir Mikhailovich Koretsky	0	0
(Czechoslovakia) Jan Krčmář	3	0
(Soviet Union) Sergei Borisovich Krylov	34	11
(Poland) Jerzy Langrod	2	0
(Haiti) Abel Leger	5	0
(Dominican Republic) Arturo Logroño	0	0
(Honduras) Julián López Pineda	0	0
(Colombia) Carlos Lozano y Lozano	15	2
(United Kingdom) Arnold McNair	34	10
(Greece) George Maridakis	1	0
(Uruguay) Martín C. Martínez	1	0
(New Zealand) Michael Myers	4	1
(Venezuela) Caracciolo Parra Pérez	14	1
(Soviet Union) Ivan Sergeyevich Peretersky	1	0
(Venezuela) Néstor Luis Pérez	1	2
(Italy) Massimo Pilotti	0	1
(Argentina) Luis Podestá Costa	30	5
(Byelorussian Soviet Socialist Republic) Nikolai Nikolayevich Polyansky	1	0
(Guatemala) Miguel Prado Solares	withdrawn	
(Canada) John Erskine Read	27	8
(Bolivia) Julio Salmón	0	0
(Turkey) Muammer Raşit Seviğ	1	0
(Greece) Jean Spiropoulos	18	4
(Ecuador) José Luis Tamayo	0	0
(Cuba) Cosme de la Torriente	2	0
(Dominican Republic) Manuel de Jesus Troncoso de la Concha	0	0
(Bolivia) José Macedonio Urquidi	1	0
(Colombia) Francisco José Urrutia	0	0
(Paraguay) Celso Ramon Velázquez	1	0
(Netherlands) Jan Hendrik Willem Verzijl	8	5
(Peru) Manuel Vicente Villarán	0	0
(Belgium) Charles de Visscher	40	9
(Poland) Bohdan Winiarski	19	5
(India) Muhammad Zafarullah Khan	27	4
(Nicaragua) Maximo Zepeda	6	0
(Socialist Federal Republic of Yugoslavia) Milovan Zoričić	26	8
(Egypt) Youssef Zulficar Pasha	0	0

Thirteen candidates received an absolute majority of votes in both bodies and were thus elected to the Court. Two seats were to be filled through further rounds of voting.

=== Further votes ===
(Candidates who did not receive a vote in any of the further ballots are not listed.)

Candidates	General Assembly majority = 26			Security Council majority = 6		
Candidates	Vote 2	Vote 3	Vote 4	Vote 2	Vote 3	Vote 4
(Iran) Mostafa Adl	0	1	1	1	0	0
(Australia) Kenneth Hamilton Bailey	15	15	12	3	1	1
(Turkey) Cemil Bilsel	2	0	0	0	0	0
(Honduras) Julián Ríos Cáceres	1	2	0	0	0	0
(Iran) Ahmad Matin-Daftari	0	0	1	0	0	0
(Philippines) Francisco Delgado	2	4	1	0	0	0
(Peru) Arturo García Salazar	1	0	0	0	0	0
(Norway) Helge Klæstad	16	30	-	5	8	-
(Socialist Federal Republic of Yugoslavia) Mihailo Konstantinović	0	0	1	0	0	0
(Poland) Jerzy Langrod	1	0	0	0	0	0
(Colombia) Carlos Lozano y Lozano	1	0	0	0	0	0
(Argentina) Luis Podestá Costa	4	3	1	0	0	0
(Turkey) Muammer Raşit Seviğ	0	1	0	0	0	0
(Greece) Jean Spiropoulos	10	3	0	1	0	0
(Netherlands) Jan Hendrik Willem Verzijl	11	8	0	3	1	2
(Poland) Bohdan Winiarski	18	24	26	7	-	8
(India) Muhammad Zafarullah Khan	15	11	7	2	1	0

At the second vote, Mr Winiarski obtained an absolute majority of votes in the Security Council, and no candidate could obtain an absolute majority of votes in the General Assembly.

After the second vote, debates followed both in the Council and the Assembly, seeking to clarify the procedure to be followed. The Statute provided that if vacancies remain after the first meeting, the two organs proceed, again independently of one another, at a second meeting and, if necessary, a third meeting to elect candidates by further ballots for seats remaining vacant, the results again being compared after the required number of candidates have obtained an absolute majority in each organ. If after the third meeting, one or more seats still remain unfilled, the General Assembly and the Security Council may form a joint conference consisting of six members, three appointed by each organ. This joint conference may, by an absolute majority, agree upon one name for each seat still vacant and submit the name for the respective acceptance of the General Assembly and the Security Council.

The discussion therefore arose as to whether each round of voting should count as one meeting, or whether several rounds of voting may be held at one meeting – in other words, whether the next round of voting at each body would constitute the third meeting following which a joint conference could be formed.

The General Assembly proceeded on the understanding that each round of voting is a separate meeting. At its third vote, Mr Klæstad received an absolute majority of votes.

The Security Council proceeded on the opposite understanding and took a third vote without the candidature of Mr Winiarski, who had obtained an absolute majority at the second vote. Mr Klæstad received an absolute majority of votes and was declared elected.

The Assembly then discussed whether a joint conference was to be formed, but decided to go on with the fourth round of voting. Mr Winiarski obtained an absolute majority of votes. The Security Council then proceeded on its fourth round of voting and confirmed an absolute majority of votes in favour of Mr Winiarski who was thus also elected.

In future elections, this procedure would be streamlined in order to avoid this sort of confusion.

== Composition of the Court ==
Following the election, lots were drawn in order to determine which judges were to sit a nine-year term, a six-year term and a three-year term, so as to allow a re-election of one third of the judges every three years. The final composition of the Court, with indication of the length of judges' terms, was as follows:

Judge	Term starts / renewed	Term ends
(Egypt) Abdel Hamid Badawi Pasha	1946	1949
(China) Hsu Mo	1946	1949
(Canada) John Read	1946	1949
(Poland) Bohdan Winiarski	1946	1949
(Socialist Federal Republic of Yugoslavia) Milovan Zoričić	1946	1949
(Mexico) Isidro Fabela Alfaro	1946	1952
(United States) Green Hackworth	1946	1952
(Norway) Helge Klæstad	1946	1952
(Soviet Union) Sergei Krylov	1946	1952
(Belgium) Charles de Visscher	1946	1952
(Chile) Alejandro Álvarez	1946	1955
(Brazil) Philadelpho Azevedo	1946	1955
(France) Jules Basdevant	1946	1955
(El Salvador) José Gustavo Guerrero	1946	1955
(United Kingdom) Arnold McNair	1946	1955

The election to fill the vacancies that would open in 1949 was held in 1948, launching the now standard three-year cycle of ICJ elections.
