= 1954 International Court of Justice judges election =

The 1954 International Court of Justice election took place on 7 October 1954 at the Headquarters of the United Nations in New York. In the set of triennial elections, the General Assembly and the Security Council concurrently elect five judges to the Court for nine-year terms, in this case beginning on 6 February 1955. In this particular case, a sixth vacancy was to be filled due to the death of one of the judges.

== Background ==
The International Court of Justice (ICJ), based in The Hague, is one of the principal organs of the United Nations. Also known as the World Court, it adjudicates legal disputes between states, and provides advisory opinions on legal questions submitted by other UN organs or agencies.

The court consists of 15 judges, with five judges elected every three years. (In the case of death or other vacancy, a judge is elected for the remainder of the term.) Judges are required to be independent and impartial; they may not exercise any political or administrative function, and do not act as a representative of their home state.

Elections of members of the Court are governed by articles 2 through 15 of the Statute of the International Court of Justice.

The previous full election was held in 1951.

On 27 November 1953, an election was held in order to fill the occasional vacancy following the resignation of the Soviet judge Sergei Golunsky. In a nearly unanimous vote, Fyodor Kozhevnikov, also of USSR, was elected for the remainder of Golunsky's term.

On 30 November 1953, the Indian judge B.N. Rau died. The election to fill this occasional vacancy was scheduled to coincide with the regular 1954 election of five members.

The composition of the Court prior to the 1954 elections was thus as follows:

Judge	Term starts / renewed	Term ends
Vacancy - Benegal Narsing Rau (India)	1952	1961; died 1953
Alejandro Álvarez (Chile)	1946	1955
Jules Basdevant (France)	1946	1955
Jose Gustavo Guerrero (El Salvador)	1946	1955
Arnold McNair (United Kingdom)	1946	1955
Levi Carneiro (Brazil)	1952	1955
Abdel Hamid Badawi Pasha (Egypt)	1946, 1949	1958
Hsu Mo (China)	1946, 1949	1958
John Read (Canada)	1946, 1949	1958
Bohdan Winiarski (Poland)	1946, 1949	1958
(Socialist Federal Republic of Yugoslavia) Milovan Zoričić (Yugoslavia)	1946, 1949	1958
Enrique Armand-Ugón (Uruguay)	1952	1961
Green Hackworth (United States)	1946, 1952	1961
Helge Klæstad (Norway)	1946, 1952	1961
(Soviet Union) Fyodor Ivanovich Kozhevnikov (USSR)	1953	1961

Accordingly, the 1954 election saw the seat of the deceased Judge Rau to be filled as an occasional vacancy for the remainder of his term, and, technically in a separate election, the seats of Judges Álvarez, Basdevant, Guerrero, McNair and Carneiro were to be contested.

== Candidates ==
=== Qualifications ===
Article 2 of the Statute of the International Court of Justice provides that judges shall be elected "from among persons of high moral character, who possess the qualifications required in their respective countries for appointment to the highest judicial offices, or are jurisconsults of recognized competence in international law".

=== Nomination procedure ===
All States parties to the Statute of the ICJ had the right to propose candidates. Nominations of candidates for election to the ICJ are made by a group consisting of the members of the Permanent Court of Arbitration (PCA), designated by that State. For this purpose, members of the PCA act in "national groups" (i.e. all the PCA members from any individual state). (In the case of UN member states not represented in the PCA, the state in question may select up to four individuals to be its "national group" for the purpose of nominating candidates to the ICJ). Every such "national group" may nominate up to four candidates, not more than two of whom shall be of their own nationality. Before making these nominations, each "national group" is recommended to consult its highest court of justice, its legal faculties and schools of law, and its national academies and national sections of international academies devoted to the study of law.

=== 1954 nominees ===
==== For the occasional vacancy ====
The following candidates were nominated for the election in order to fill the seat of the deceased Judge Rau of India:

Candidates	Nominating national groups
Ernst S.B. Colov (Denmark)	Denmark
Ramón Ernesto Cruz Uclés (Honduras)	Honduras
Thomas Frølund (Denmark)	Denmark
Luis Garrido Díaz (Mexico)	Honduras
Fernando Lara Bustamante (Costa Rica)	Costa Rica
Juan Bautista de Lavalle y García (Peru)	Peru
Ahmad Matin-Daftari (Iran)	Iran
Edgar Odio González (Costa Rica)	Costa Rica
Radhabinod Pal (India)	Bolivia, Ecuador, Egypt, India, Liechtenstein, Mexico, Peru, Switzerland, United Kingdom, United States, Yugoslavia
(Post-independence Burma (1948–1962)) Myint Thein (Burma)	Yugoslavia; withdrew
Charles de Visscher (Belgium)	Egypt, France, Luxembourg, Mexico, Netherlands, Norway, Yugoslavia
Muhammad Zafarullah Khan (Pakistan)	United States

==== For the five regular seats ====
The following candidates were nominated for the election:

Candidates	Nominating national groups
Hildebrando Pompeu Pinto Accioli (Brazil)	Brazil
Ricardo J. Alfaro (Panama)	Bolivia, Brazil, Cuba, Haiti, Panama, Peru
Jules Basdevant (France)	Belgium, Brazil, Canada, France, Egypt, Greece, Japan, Lebanon, Liechtenstein, Netherlands, New Zealand, Norway, Pakistan, Switzerland, United Kingdom, United States, Yugoslavia
Choucri Cardahi (Lebanon)	Lebanon
Ramon Carmona (Venezuela)	Venezuela
Ernst S.B. Colov (Denmark)	Denmark
Roberto Córdova (Mexico)	Argentina, Brazil, China, Cuba, Ecuador, Egypt, Haiti, Honduras, Mexico, Netherlands, Nicaragua, Panama, Peru, Philippines, Sweden, Thailand, Turkey, Venezuela, Yugoslavia
Thomas Frølund (Denmark)	Denmark
Jose Gustavo Guerrero (El Salvador)	China, Cuba, El Salvador, Greece, Haiti, Honduras, Japan, Liechtenstein, Mexico, New Zealand, Nicaragua, Paraguay, Thailand, Turkey, United Kingdom, United States
Shigeru Kuriyama (Japan)	China, Iran, Japan, United States
Hersch Lauterpacht (United Kingdom)	Belgium, Canada, New Zealand, United Kingdom, United States
George Maridakis (Greece)	Greece
Ahmad Matin-Daftari (Iran)	Iran
Arnold McNair (United Kingdom)	France, Japan, Lebanon, Liechtenstein, Netherlands, Norway, Sweden, Switzerland, Yugoslavia; withdrew
Lucio Moreno Quintana (Argentina)	Argentina, Bolivia, China, Ecuador, Egypt, Haiti, Honduras, Mexico, Nicaragua, Paraguay, Peru, Venezuela, Yugoslavia
Ricardo Paras (Philippines)	Philippines
Sture Petrén (Sweden)	Sweden
Eduardo Plaza (Venezuela)	Venezuela
Seni Pramoj (Thailand)	Thailand
Henri Rolin (Belgium)	Denmark, Iran, Panama
Raúl Sapena Pastor (Paraguay)	Argentina, Bolivia, Ecuador, El Salvador, Honduras, Paraguay, Peru
Georges Sauser-Hall (Switzerland)	Belgium, France, Liechtenstein, Sweden, Switzerland
Jean Spiropoulos (Greece)	Greece
Phya Ladpli Thamaprakhan (Thailand)	Thailand
Pedro Tuason (Philippines)	Philippines
Modesto Valle (Nicaragua)	Nicaragua
Jan Hendrik Willem Verzijl (Netherlands)	Netherlands
Charles de Visscher (Belgium)	Belgium, Canada, Denmark, France, New Zealand, Norway, Switzerland, United Kingdom
Homero Viteri Lafronte (Ecuador)	Ecuador
Muhammad Zafarullah Khan (Pakistan)	Canada, Egypt, Lebanon, Pakistan

== Election procedure ==
The General Assembly and the Security Council proceed, independently of one another, to elect five members of the Court (or one member, if the election is held in order to fill an occasional vacancy).

To be elected, a candidate must obtain an absolute majority of votes both in the General Assembly and in the Security Council. At the time, 32 votes constituted an absolute majority in the General Assembly and 6 votes constituted an absolute majority in the Security Council (with no distinction being made between permanent and non-permanent members of the Security Council).

When five candidates have obtained the required majority in one of the organs, the president of that organ notifies the president of the other organ of the names of the five candidates. The president of the latter does not communicate such names to the members of that organ until that organ itself has given five candidates the required majority of votes.

After both the General Assembly and the Security Council have produced a list of five names that received an absolute majority of the votes, the two lists are compared. Any candidate appearing on both lists is elected. But if fewer than five candidates have been thus elected, the two organs proceed, again independently of one another, at a second meeting and, if necessary, a third meeting to elect candidates by further ballots for seats remaining vacant, the results again being compared after the required number of candidates have obtained an absolute majority in each organ.

If after the third meeting, one or more seats still remain unfilled, the General Assembly and the Security Council may form a joint conference consisting of six members, three appointed by each organ, in order to elect a candidate to fill the remaining seat(s). This option had never been used prior to the 1954 elections, and would never be used up to now.

== Results ==
=== Filling the occasional vacancy ===
Candidates that did not receive a single vote in either the General Assembly or the Security Council are not listed.

Candidates	General Assembly majority = 33		Security Council majority = 6
Radhabinod Pal (India)	32	29	5
Muhammad Zafarullah Khan (Pakistan)	30	33	6

Zafarullah Khan was thus elected to fill the seat that became vacant due to the death of B.N.Rau. This was a departure from the experience of the two previous elections held in order to fill occasional vacancies, whereby the seats were filled by judges of the same nationality as the judge who had died or resigned. On the other hand, the informal rule was confirmed to the effect that the vacant seat is to be filled by a judge at least from the same region as the one who had vacated the seat (note the large number of candidates from outside Asia who received zero votes at the election).

=== Filling regular seats ===
Candidates that did not receive a single vote in either the General Assembly or the Security Council are not listed.

Candidates	General Assembly majority = 33	Security Council majority = 6
Hildebrando Pompeu Pinto Accioli (Brazil)	0	0
Ricardo J. Alfaro (Panama)	21	1
Jules Basdevant (France)	40	10
Choucri Cardahi (Lebanon)	1	0
Ramon Carmona (Venezuela)	1	0
Ernst S.B. Colov (Denmark)	0	0
Roberto Córdova (Mexico)	41	8
Thomas Frølund (Denmark)	0	0
Jose Gustavo Guerrero (El Salvador)	41	7
Shigeru Kuriyama (Japan)	16	2
Hersch Lauterpacht (United Kingdom)	39	9
George Maridakis (Greece)	0	0
Ahmad Matin-Daftari (Iran)	2	0
Arnold McNair (United Kingdom)	1	0
Lucio Moreno Quintana (Argentina)	36	7
Ricardo Paras (Philippines)	2	0
Sture Petrén (Sweden)	0	0
Eduardo Plaza (Venezuela)	0	0
Seni Pramoj (Thailand)	1	0
Henri Rolin (Belgium)	5	0
Raúl Sapena Pastor (Paraguay)	21	1
Georges Sauser-Hall (Switzerland)	10	1
Jean Spiropoulos (Greece)	0	0
Phya Ladpli Thamaprakhan (Thailand)	1	0
Pedro Tuason (Philippines)	1	0
Modesto Valle (Nicaragua)	0	0
Jan Hendrik Willem Verzijl (Netherlands)	0	0
Charles de Visscher (Belgium)	19	6
Homero Viteri Lafronte (Ecuador)	2	0
Muhammad Zafarullah Khan (Pakistan)	-	-

Despite a large number of candidates (which still was lower than at any previous election), the election was relatively uneventful: the same five candidates obtained an absolute majority of votes in the first round of voting in both the General Assembly and the Security Council. They were declared elected to the Court, without a need for further rounds of voting.

== Aftermath ==
The composition of the Court following the election was as follows:

Judge	Term starts / renewed	Term ends
Abdel Hamid Badawi Pasha (Egypt)	1946, 1949	1958
Hsu Mo (China)	1946, 1949	1958
John Read (Canada)	1946, 1949	1958
Bohdan Winiarski (Poland)	1946, 1949	1958
(Socialist Federal Republic of Yugoslavia) Milovan Zoričić (Yugoslavia)	1946, 1949	1958
Enrique Armand-Ugón (Uruguay)	1952	1961
Green Hackworth (United States)	1946, 1952	1961
Helge Klæstad (Norway)	1946, 1952	1961
(Soviet Union) Fyodor Ivanovich Kozhevnikov (USSR)	1953	1961
Muhammad Zafarullah Khan (Pakistan)	1954	1961
Jules Basdevant (France)	1946, 1955	1964
Jose Gustavo Guerrero (El Salvador)	1946, 1955	1964
Lucio Moreno Quintana (Argentina)	1955	1964
Hersch Lauterpacht (United Kingdom)	1955	1964
Roberto Córdova (Mexico)	1955	1964

The seats of Judges Badawi Pasha, Hsu, Read, Winiarski and Zoričić were to be contested at the 1957 election. However, following the death of Judge Hsu in June 1956, an election to fill the occasional vacancy was held in December 1956.
