= 1948 International Court of Justice judges election =

The 1948 International Court of Justice election took place on 22 October 1948 in the Palais de Chaillot, Paris. This was the second ever election of judges of the court, one of the six "principal organs" of the United Nations, and the first one to be held in order to fill five (rather than all fifteen) judges' seats. It thus launched the pattern of triennial elections whereby the General Assembly and the Security Council concurrently elect five judges to the court for nine-year terms, in this case beginning on 6 February 1949.

== Background ==
The International Court of Justice (ICJ), based in The Hague, is one of the principal organs of the United Nations. Also known as the World Court, it adjudicates legal disputes between states, and provides advisory opinions on legal questions submitted by other UN organs or agencies.

The court consists of 15 judges, with five judges elected every three years. (In the case of death or other vacancy, a judge is elected for the remainder of the term.) Judges are required to be independent and impartial; they may not exercise any political or administrative function, and do not act as a representative of their home state.

Elections of members of the court are governed by articles 2 through 15 of the Statute of the International Court of Justice.

The previous election, the first of its kind, was held in 1946 and resulted in the following composition of the court:

Judge	Term starts / renewed	Term ends
Abdel Hamid Badawi Pasha (Egypt)	1946	1949
Hsu Mo (China) (Note: At the time, China was represented at the UN by the government of the Taiwan-based Republic of China. For details, see China and the United Nations#Republic of China in the United Nations (1945–1971))	1946	1949
John Read (Canada)	1946	1949
Bohdan Winiarski (Poland)	1946	1949
(Socialist Federal Republic of Yugoslavia) Milovan Zoričić (Yugoslavia)	1946	1949
Isidro Fabela Alfaro (Mexico)	1946	1952
Green Hackworth (United States)	1946	1952
Helge Klæstad (Norway)	1946	1952
(Soviet Union) Sergei Krylov (USSR)	1946	1952
Charles de Visscher (Belgium)	1946	1952
Alejandro Álvarez (Chile)	1946	1955
Philadelpho Azevedo (Brazil)	1946	1955
Jules Basdevant (France)	1946	1955
Jose Gustavo Guerrero (El Salvador)	1946	1955
Arnold McNair (United Kingdom)	1946	1955

The seats of Judges Badawi Pasha, Hsu, Read, Winiarski and Zoričić were thus to be contested. All of these five incumbents were candidates for re-election.

== Candidates ==
=== Qualifications ===
Article 2 of the Statute of the International Court of Justice provides that judges shall be elected "from among persons of high moral character, who possess the qualifications required in their respective countries for appointment to the highest judicial offices, or are jurisconsults of recognized competence in international law".

=== Nomination procedure ===
All States parties to the Statute of the ICJ had the right to propose candidates. Nominations of candidates for election to the ICJ are made by a group consisting of the members of the Permanent Court of Arbitration (PCA), designated by that State. For this purpose, members of the PCA act in "national groups" (i.e. all the PCA members from any individual state). (In the case of UN member states not represented in the PCA, the state in question may select up to four individuals to be its "national group" for the purpose of nominating candidates to the ICJ). Every such "national group" may nominate up to four candidates, not more than two of whom shall be of their own nationality. Before making these nominations, each "national group" is recommended to consult its highest court of justice, its legal faculties and schools of law, and its national academies and national sections of international academies devoted to the study of law.

== Election procedure ==
As the 1948 election was only the second occasion for the respective rules of procedure to be applied, some aspects of the procedure were yet to be finalized.

According to the Statute, ICJ judges are elected through parallel procedures at the General Assembly and the Security Council. To be elected, a candidate must obtain an absolute majority of votes both in the General Assembly and in the Security Council.

At the time, 30 votes constituted an absolute majority in the General Assembly and 6 votes constituted an absolute majority in the Security Council (with no distinction being made between permanent and non-permanent members of the Security Council).

== Results ==
=== Meeting 1 ===
Candidates that did not receive a single vote in either the General Assembly or the Security Council are not listed.

Candidates	General Assembly majority = 30				Security Council majority = 6					
Candidates	R1	R2	R3	R4	R1	R2	R3	R4	R5	R6
Hsu Mo (China)	48	-	-	-	10	-	-	-	-	-
Abdel Hamid Badawi Pasha (Egypt)	43	-	-	-	9	-	-	-	-	-
John Erskine Read (Canada)	37	-	-	-	6	-	-	-	-	-
Bohdan Winiarski (Poland)	24	27	29	33	6	-	-	-	-	-
Jean Spiropoulos (Greece)	20	20	25	31	3	2	3	2	1	1
Benegal Narsing Rau (India)	19	13	15	14	2	3	4	5	5	6
Mostafa Adl (Iran)	18	10	5	3	3	0	0	0	0	0
(Socialist Federal Republic of Yugoslavia) Milovan Zoričić (Yugoslavia)	17	20	22	21	5	2	1	1	2	2
Antonín Hobza (Czechoslovakia)	8	8	7	7	2	3	3	3	3	2
Massimo Pilotti (Italy)	7	3	1	0	1	1	0	0	0	0
(Post-independence Burma (1948–1962)) E Maung (Burma)	5	2	1	2	1	0	0	0	0	0
(Thailand) Wan Waithayakon (Siam)	5	0	1	0	1	0	0	0	0	0
Cemil Bilsel (Turkey)	4	5	3	2	0	0	0	0	0	0
Ricardo J. Alfaro (Panama)	3	1	0	0	0	0	0	0	0	0
Carlos Saavedra Lamas (Argentina)	3	0	0	0	0	0	0	0	0	0
Herbert Vere Evatt (Australia)	2	1	0	0	0	0	0	0	0	0
Fares al-Khoury (Syria)	2	1	0	0	0	0	0	0	0	0
Carlos Leonidas Acevedo (Guatemala)	2	0	0	0	0	0	0	0	0	0
Claro M. Recto (Philippines)	2	0	0	0	0	0	0	0	0	0
Muammer Raşit Seviğ (Turkey)	2	1	1	0	0	0	0	0	0	0
Jesús María Yepes (Colombia)	2	0	0	0	1	0	0	0	0	0
Dionisio Anzilotti (Italy)	1	0	0	0	0	0	0	0	0	0
Tomás Manuel Elío (Bolivia)	1	0	0	0	0	0	0	0	0	0
Muhammad Zafarullah Khan (Pakistan)	1	1	0	0	0	0	0	0	0	0
Miguel Prado Solares (Guatemala)	1	1	1	1	0	0	0	0	0	0
J. B. L. Reyes (Philippines)	1	0	0	0	0	0	0	0	0	0
Eugenio Silva Peña (Guatemala)	1	0	0	0	0	0	0	0	0	0
Ahmad Matin-Daftari (Iran)	0	1	1	1	0	0	0	0	0	0

The General Assembly and the Security Council, independently of each other, each held several rounds of voting until five candidates received an absolute majority of votes. After five candidates did so both in the assembly and the council, the lists were compared, and the four candidates whose names appeared on both lists, Messrs Hsu, Badawi Pasha, Read and Winiarski, were declared elected. The fifth vacancy was to be filled after further rounds of voting.

=== Meeting 2 ===
Candidates	General Assembly majority = 30			Security Council majority = 6	
Candidates	R1	R2	R3	R1	R2
(Socialist Federal Republic of Yugoslavia) Milovan Zoričić (Yugoslavia)	22	28	37	5	7
Jean Spiropoulos (Greece)	19	16	12	3	3
Benegal Narsing Rau (India)	10	7	4	3	1
Antonín Hobza (Czechoslovakia)	1	0	0	0	0

Mr Zoričić, having received an absolute majority of votes both in the assembly and in the council, was elected to fill the fifth vacancy.

== Aftermath ==
All five incumbent judges whose terms were to expire were re-elected to the court. The composition of the court thus remained unchanged from the previous election:

Judge	Term starts / renewed	Term ends
Isidro Fabela Alfaro (Mexico)	1946	1952
Green Hackworth (United States)	1946	1952
Helge Klæstad (Norway)	1946	1952
(Soviet Union) Sergei Krylov (USSR)	1946	1952
Charles de Visscher (Belgium)	1946	1952
Alejandro Álvarez (Chile)	1946	1955
Philadelpho Azevedo (Brazil)	1946	1955
Jules Basdevant (France)	1946	1955
Jose Gustavo Guerrero (El Salvador)	1946	1955
Arnold McNair (United Kingdom)	1946	1955
Abdel Hamid Badawi Pasha (Egypt)	1946, 1949	1958
Hsu Mo (China)	1946, 1949	1958
John Read (Canada)	1946, 1949	1958
Bohdan Winiarski (Poland)	1946, 1949	1958
(Socialist Federal Republic of Yugoslavia) Milovan Zoričić (Yugoslavia)	1946, 1949	1958

The seats of Judges Alfaro, Hackworth, Klæstad, Krylov and de Visscher were to be contested at the 1951 election.
