= Nottebohm case =

Legal case

Nottebohm Case (Liechtenstein v. Guatemala)
- Court: International Court of Justice
- Full case name: Nottebohm Case (second phase), Judgment of April 6, 1955
- Decided: April 6, 1955
- Citation: [1955] ICJ 1

Court membership
- Judges sitting: Green Hackworth, Abdel Badawi Pasha, Jules Basdevant, Milovan Zoričić, Helge Klæstad, John Read, Hsu Mo, Enrique Armand-Ugón, Fyodor Kozhevnikov, Muhammad Zafrulla Khan, Lucio Moreno Quintana, Roberto Cordova, Paul Guggenheim (ad hoc), and Carlos García Bauer (ad hoc)

Case opinions
- Dissent: Helge Klæstad; Dissent: John Read; Dissent: Paul Guggenheim

Keywords
- diplomatic protection

Nottebohm case (Liechtenstein v. Guatemala) [1955] ICJ 1 is a 1955 case adjudicated by the International Court of Justice (ICJ). Liechtenstein sought a ruling to force Guatemala to recognize Friedrich Nottebohm as a Liechtenstein national. The case has been cited in many definitions of nationality.

== Background ==
Friedrich Nottebohm was born on September 16, 1881, in Hamburg, Germany. In 1905, he moved to Guatemala, where he went into business in trade, banking, and plantations with his brothers. The business prospered, and Nottebohm became its head in 1937. Nottebohm lived in Guatemala until 1943 as a permanent resident without ever acquiring Guatemalan citizenship. He sometimes visited Germany on business, and had friends and relatives in both countries. He also paid a few visits to Liechtenstein to see his brother Hermann, who had moved there in 1931 and became a citizen.

In 1939, Nottebohm again visited Liechtenstein, and on October 9, 1939, shortly after World War II began, he applied for citizenship. His application was approved and he became a citizen. Under German law, he lost his German citizenship. In January 1940, he returned to Guatemala on a Liechtenstein passport and informed the local government of his change of nationality.

Although originally neutral, Guatemala soon sided with the Allies and formally declared war on Germany on December 11, 1941. In spite of his Liechtenstein citizenship, the Guatemalan government treated Nottebohm as a German citizen. As part of the deportation of Germans from Latin America during World War II, in which the US co-operated with various Latin American countries to intern in the US over 4,000 persons of German ancestry or citizenship, Nottebohm was arrested by the Guatemalan government as an enemy alien in 1943, handed over to a US military base, and transferred to the US, where he was interned until 1946. The Guatemalan government confiscated all his property in the country, and the US government also seized his company's assets in the US. In 1950, the US government returned to the Nottebohm family about half the value of what it had seized. The Guatemalan government held on to his property and returned 16 coffee plantations to his family in 1962, after he had died. After his release, he returned to Liechtenstein, where he lived for the rest of his life.

In 1951, the Liechtenstein government, acting on behalf of Nottebohm, brought suit against Guatemala in the International Court of Justice for what it argued was unjust treatment of him and the illegal confiscation of his property. However, the government of Guatemala argued that Nottebohm did not gain Liechtenstein citizenship for the purposes of international law. The court agreed and so stopped the case from continuing.

== Judgment ==
Although the Court stated that it is the sovereign right of all states to determine its own citizens and criteria for becoming one in municipal law, such a process would have to be internationally scrutinized if the question is of diplomatic protection. The Court upheld the principle of effective nationality (the Nottebohm principle): the national must prove a meaningful connection to the state in question. That principle had previously been applied only in cases of dual nationality to determine the nationality that should be used in a given case. The court ruled that Nottebohm's naturalization as a citizen of Liechtenstein had not been based on any genuine link with that country, but for the sole purpose of enabling him to replace his status as the national of a belligerent state with that of a neutral state in a time of war. The Court held that Liechtenstein was not entitled to take up his case and put forward an international claim on his behalf against Guatemala:

Naturalization was asked for not so much for the purpose of obtaining a legal recognition of Nottebohm's membership in fact in the population of Liechtenstein, as it was to enable him to substitute for his status as a national of a belligerent State that of a national of a neutral State, with the sole aim of thus coming within the protection of Liechtenstein but not of becoming wedded to its traditions, its interests, its way of life or of assuming the obligations-other than fiscal obligations-and exercising the rights pertaining to the status thus acquired. Guatemala is under no obligation to recognize a nationality granted in such circumstances. Liechtenstein consequently is not entitled to extend its protection to Nottebohm vis-à-vis Guatemala and its claim must, for this reason, be held to be inadmissible.

== Criticism ==
The ruling came under scrutiny due to the implication that a person could be left without any effective nationality. While applying such a standard in cases of dual nationality would still leave a person eligible for diplomatic protection from one state, Nottebohm was not a citizen of any country other than Liechtenstein at the time, and the ruling implied he may not have been an effective national of any country, though it's unclear if Nottebohm was treated as a dual national due to his long-term residence in Guatemala or previous links to Germany. The International Law Commission noted that in an age of globalization and large-scale migration, this standard has the potential of creating an underclass of millions of people lacking any diplomatic protection, as "there are millions of persons who have drifted away from their state of nationality and made their lives in states whose nationality they never acquire, or have acquired from birth and descent from states with which they have a tenuous connection."

== See also ==
- List of International Court of Justice cases
