= Eduardo Juan Couture =

Eduardo Juan Couture Etcheverry
- Born: May 24, 1904; Montevideo, Uruguay
- Died: May 11, 1956 (aged 51)
- Education: University of the Republic
- Occupations: lawyer, professor, writer
- Employer: Law School (University of the Republic)

Eduardo Juan Couture Etcheverry (1904–1956) was an Uruguayan jurist whose works are fundamental to the teaching of procedural law in Latin America.

Couture taught at the University of the Republic, Uruguay from 1931 on. His main area of interest was civil procedure.

He found America-wide recognition as the editor of the journal Revista de Derecho, Jurisprudencia y Administración, and as the author of the textbooks Fundamentos de Derecho Procesal Civil (1942) and Estudios de Derecho Civil (1948–50).

Couture's approach to legal procedure was founded on the constitutional rights of individuals. It was also informed by a systematic comparison of Latin American codes of procedure.
