= Cosme de la Torriente y Peraza =

Cuban soldier, politician, lawyer and statesman (1872-1956)

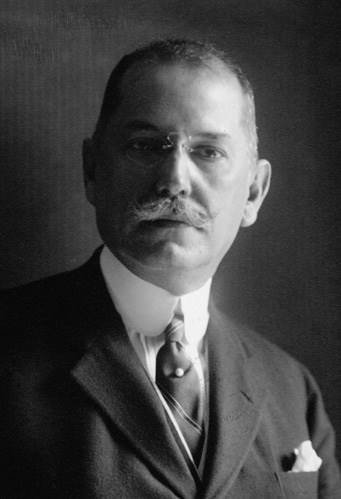
Torriente in 1920

Cosme de la Torriente y Peraza (27 June 1872 – 7 December 1956) was a Cuban soldier, politician, lawyer and statesman.

== Biography ==
He was born on 27 June 1872.

He received his law degree from the University of Havana. When the Revolution began in 1895, Torriente was active in the revolutionary clubs of Matanzas, and in March of that year he embarked for the United States to take part in the filibustering expeditions there being organized. De la Torriente was a Colonel in the Spanish–American War. He represented the Cuban Government at the wedding of King Alfonso XIII of Spain and was conferred the Order of Isabella the Catholic. He was president of the League of Nations from 1923 until 1924. He was conferred the Order of the Legion of Honour of France after World War I.

He died on 7 December 1956 in Havana.
