= James Leslie Brierly =

English scholar of international law (1881–1955)

James Leslie Brierly

James Leslie Brierly (9 September 1881 – 20 December 1955) was an English scholar of international law.

== Biography ==
James Leslie Brierly was born on 9 September 1881 in Huddersfield to Emily Sykes and Sydney Herbert Brierly.

Brierly was a professor of law at the University of Manchester from 1920, Chichele Professor of International Law and Diplomacy at the University of Oxford from 1922 to 1947, and the first Montague Burton Professor of International Relations at the University of Edinburgh from 1948 to 1951.

== Death ==
He died on 20 December 1955 at his home in Headington.

== Publications ==
- The Law of Nations (1928; 2d edition, 1936; 3d edition, 1942; 4th edition, 1949; 5th edition, 1955; 6th edition, 1963)
- The Outlook for International Law (1944)
- The Covenant and the Charter (1947)

== Works cited ==
- Clapham, Andrew (4 November 2020). "James Brierly, The Law of Nations: An Introduction to the International Law of Peace, 1928". In Barrett, Jill; Gauci, Jean-Pierre (eds.). British Contributions to International Law, 1915–2015. Brill Publishers. pp. 27–49. doi:10.1163/9789004386242_003. ISBN 978-90-04-38624-2. S2CID 240604316.
