= Raul Fernandes (diplomat) =

Brazilian politician (1877–1968)

Minister of Foreign Affairs of Brazil
- In office 1946–1951
- In office 1954–1955

Personal details
- Born: 24 October 1877 Valença, Rio de Janeiro, Brazil
- Died: 6 January 1968 (aged 90) Rio de Janeiro, Brazil
- Occupation: Diplomat, politician

Raul Fernandes (24 October 1877 – 6 January 1968) was a Brazilian diplomat and politician who served as Minister of Foreign Affairs of Brazil from 1946 to 1951 and from 1954 to 1955.

== Life and career ==
Fernandes was born in 1877 in Valença, in the state of Rio de Janeiro, Brazil. He studied law at the University of São Paulo, beginning his political career as a federal deputy before moving into diplomacy.

As a member of the Brazilian delegation to the 1919–1920 Paris Peace Conference following World War I, Fernandes signed the Treaty of Versailles. He subsequently led four delegations to the League of Nations and helped draft the statute creating the Permanent Court of International Justice.

Fernandes represented Brazil at the 1946 Paris Peace Conference following World War II, becoming the only man to serve as a delegate to both Paris Peace Conferences. From 1946 to 1951, and again from 1954 to 1955, he served as Brazil's Minister of Foreign Affairs. In this role, he was the permanent chair of the Inter-American Conference of 1947, which resulted in the Inter-American Treaty of Reciprocal Assistance. He was an advocate of Pan-Americanism and closer ties with the United States.

Fernandes died on 6 January 1968 in Rio de Janeiro. At the time of his death, he was the last surviving signatory of the Treaty of Versailles.
