= Hildebrando Accioly =

Brazilian politician (1888–1962)

- Hildebrando Accioly in 1948

Brazilian Foreign Minister
- In office September 8, 1948 – December 15, 1948
- Preceded by: Raul Fernandes
- Succeeded by: Raul Fernandes
- In office May 7, 1947 – May 28, 1947
- Preceded by: Raul Fernandes
- Succeeded by: Raul Fernandes

Director of the Rio Branco Institute
- In office April 28, 1945 – June 13, 1948
- Succeeded by: Jacome Baggi de Berenguer César

Ambassador of Brazil to the Holy See of Brazil to Holy See
- In office 1939–1944
- Preceded by: José Bonifácio de Andrada e Silva (diplomat)
- Succeeded by: Maurizio Nabuco

Personal details
- Born: June 25, 1888 Fortaleza
- Died: April 4, 1962 (aged 73) Rio de Janeiro
- Spouse: married to Olga Barbosa Accioly
- Parents: Antônio Pinto Nogueira Acioly politician cearense (father); Maria Teresa de Sousa Accioly (mother)
- Education: Law school of the Federal University of Ceará

Hildebrando Pompeu Pinto Accioly (June 25, 1888 – April 4, 1962) was a Brazilian jurist, diplomat, international law scholar, and professor who served as Minister of Foreign Affairs on two occasions, in 1947 and 1948, in the absence of Chancellor Raul Fernandes.

== Career ==
In 1914, Hildebrando Accioly joined the diplomatic service. In 1924, he was first secretary in the permanent delegation to the League of Nations in Geneva.

In 1936, Hildebrando Accioly represented Brazil as minister at the Inter-American Conference for the Consolidation of Peace (Buenos Aires, 1936). In 1937, he was raised to the post of Secretary General of the Ministry of Foreign Affairs. In 1938, he headed the Brazilian delegation to the VIII Conference International American Countries, in Lima, when he was promoted to ambassador.

From 1939 to 1944, he was Ambassador to the Holy See. From April 28, 1945 to June 13, 1948, Hildebrando Accioly was director of the Rio Branco Institute.

In 1946, Hildebrando Accioly returned to the post of general secretary of foreign affairs. He was delegate plenipotentiary to the Paris Peace Treaties, 1947.

Between May and June 1947, and between September and December 1948, he was Brazilian Minister of Foreign Affairs ad interim. Until 1950, he was president of the Permanent Council of the Organization of American States. In 1950, he was the tenth Legal Adviser of the Ministry of Foreign Affairs.

Hildebrando Accioly retired from Brazilian politics in 1953.

In 1957, he joined the Permanent Court of Arbitration at The Hague.

== Other activities ==
- Professor of international law at the Law School of the Pontifical Catholic University of São Paulo and at the Rio Branco Institute
- Member of the Brazilian Historic and Geographic Institute
