= Cemil Bilsel =

Turkish attorney, politician (1879–1949)

- Born: 1879; Damascus, Ottoman Empire
- Died: 2 September 1949 (aged 69–70); Ankara, Turkey

Professor Cemil Bilsel (1879–1949) was a Turkish lawyer, academic, and politician. He was also the former Rector of the University of Istanbul (1934–1943).

== Early life and career ==
Bilsel was born in 1879 in the city of Damascus, in Ottoman Syria, into a family of Turkish origin. In 1903 he graduated from his studies in law, and between 1908–1914 and 1921–1925, Bilsel entered the State Public Law Course at the Law Department of the Darülfünun’u Istanbul.

In 1925 he became one of the first faculty members of the Law School of Ankara University and served as a Professor of Public Law until 1934. Thereafter, Bilsel became the rector of Istanbul University and remained in this post until his retirement in 1943.

He also became a national parliament member and an international representative of Turkey in global diplomatic forums. In 1948 he was awarded an honorary doctorate in medicine by the University of Toulouse.

The "Prof. Dr. Cemil Bilsel Konferans Salonu" is a conference hall named in his honor at Istanbul University.

== Personal life ==
In addition to speaking Turkish, he could also speak in the Arabic and French languages.

Bilsel died In 1949, at the age of 70.
