= Philadelpho Azevedo =

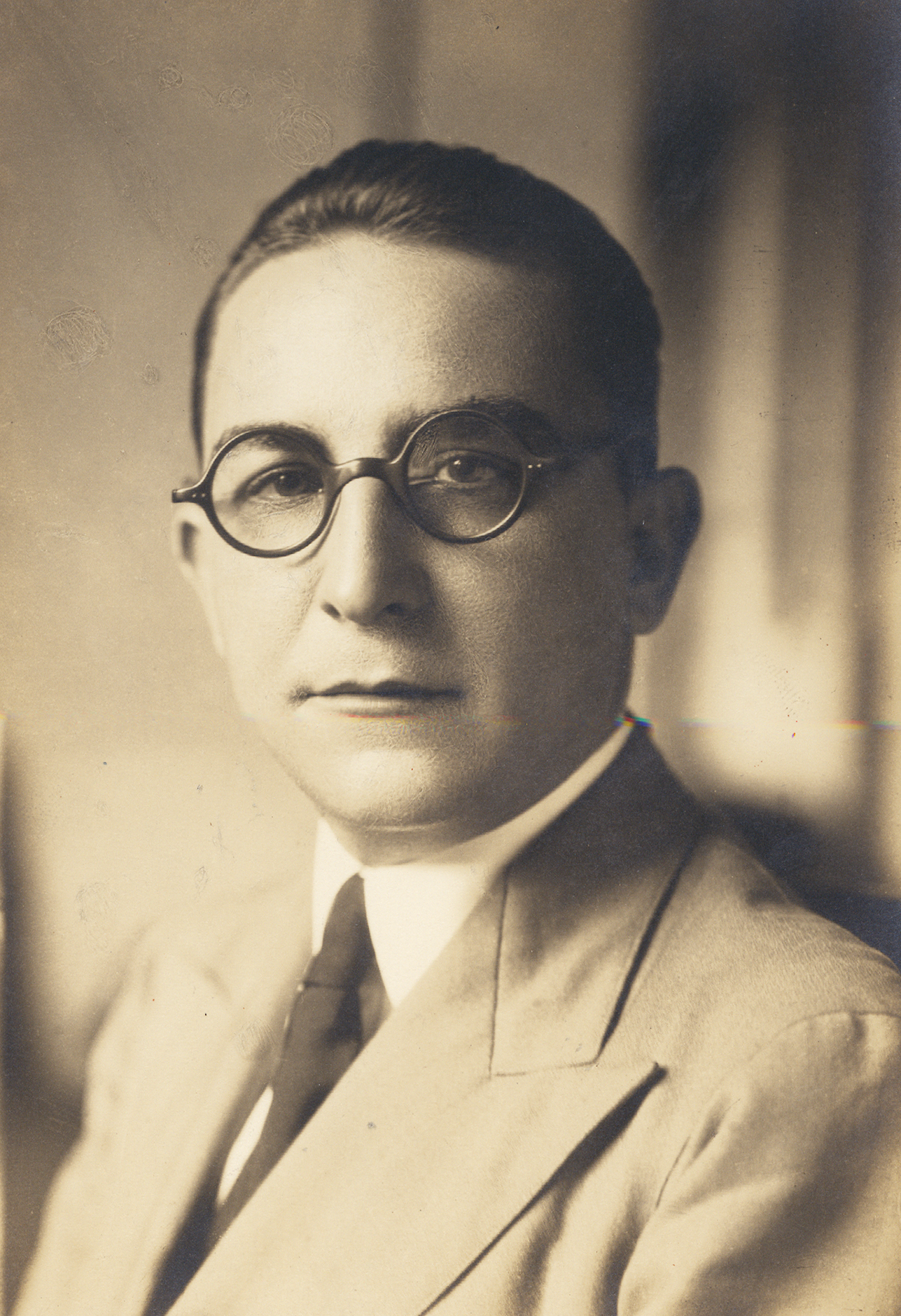

Philadelpho José de Barros e Azevedo (March 13, 1894, in Rio de Janeiro – May 7, 1951, in The Hague) was a Brazilian lawyer. From 1937 he was as a professor of civil law at the Faculdade Nacional de Direito and he served from 1946 until his death as a judge at the International Court of Justice.

== Life ==
Philadelpho Azevedo was born in 1894 in Rio de Janeiro born and in 1910 finished his education with a Baccalauréat in sciences and languages at the Colégio Pedro II. In 1914, he graduated from the National Faculty of Law. After studying in Paris, he worked from 1917 as a professor of philosophy at Colégio Pedro II. In 1932 he began work as and then in 1937 as a professor of civil law at his alma mater.

From 1925 to 1929 for the National Board of Education, and from 1934 to 1936 as a prosecutor in the previous Federal District of Rio de Janeiro. He served as president of the Institute of Brazilian Lawyers from 1937 to 1938. Furthermore, from 1937 to 1939 he sat on various government committees.

In 1942, he was appointed a judge of the Supreme Court of Brazil. From October 1945 to January 1946, he served as a prefect in the José Linhares government.

After the end of World War II, in 1946, he was one of the first judges at the newly established International Court of Justice in The Hague where he worked until his death. He died in 1951 in The Hague and was the first judge who died before the end of his term in the history of the Court. The successor to his position was his compatriot Levi Carneiro.

== Works (selection) ==
- Direito moral escriptor Thurs. (Rio de Janeiro 1930)
- To triênio de Judicatura. (São Paulo 1948)
