= Lucio Moreno Quintana =

Argentine diplomat, international lawyer and international judge

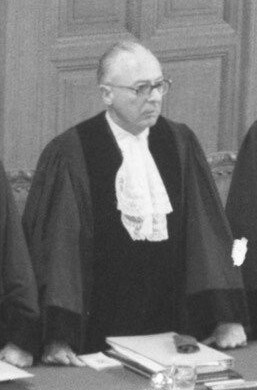
Lucio Moreno Quintana in 1961

Lucio Manuel Moreno Quintana (Paris, 31 August 1898 - Buenos Aires, 28 December 1979) was an Argentine lawyer and diplomat. He was a member of the Permanent Court of Arbitration and a judge of the International Court of Justice (ICJ). He was the first of two Argentine judges in the history of the ICJ.

== Biography ==
Moreno Quintana was born in Paris as the son of an Argentine diplomat. His maternal grandfather, Manuel Quintana, was president of Argentina from October 1904 until his death in March 1906. Moreno studied law and graduated in 1919 with a doctorate at the University of Buenos Aires.

He served as Undersecretary for Foreign Affairs under three different governments. In 1946 he led the Argentine delegation at the first United Nations General Assembly and in April of the same year he was a delegate at the last meeting of the League of Nations in Geneva.

From 1945 he was a member of the Permanent Court of Arbitration in The Hague. In the same city, he served as a judge of the International Court of Justice from 1955 to 1964.

== Bibliography ==
- Moreno Quintana, Lucio Manuel. In: Fermín Chávez, Roberto Vilchez, Enrique Manson, Lorenzo González: Diccionario Histórico Argentino. Ediciones Fabro, Buenos Aires 2005, ISBN 987-21666-0-9, p. 370.
- Lucio Manuel Moreno Quintana. In: Arthur Eyffinger, Arthur Witteveen, Mohammed Bedjaoui: La Cour Internationale de Justice 1946–1996. Martinus Nijhoff Publishers, The Hague and London 1999, ISBN 90-411-0468-2, p. 308.
