= Enrique Armand-Ugón =

Uruguayan lawyer and judge

Enrique Clemente Armand-Ugón (10 August 1893 – 1984) was a Uruguayan jurist. He served as judge of the International Court of Justice between 1952 and 1961.

== Biography ==
Armand-Ugón was born on 10 August 1893 in Colonia Valdense, Uruguay. He graduated as a lawyer from the University of the Republic in Montevideo. He was appointed Judge in the Courts of First Instance in 1920 and in the Court of Appeal in 1938. In 1945, he became a Judge of the Supreme Court of Justice of Uruguay.

Armand-Ugón headed the Uruguayan delegation to the third and fifth Session of the United Nations General Assembly in 1948 and 1950.

In February 1952 he was elected Judge of the International Court of Justice in The Hague. In addition, he was appointed judge ad hoc from 1962 to 1964, in the Case Concerning Barcelona Traction, Light and Power Case Company Limited between Belgium and Spain, at the request of Spain.

Armand-Ugón died in 1984 in Montevideo.
