= Sergei Krylov (judge) =

Sergei Borisovich Krylov (Russian: Сергей Борисович Крылов; 13 January 1888 – 24 November 1958) was a Soviet diplomat and one of the authors of the UN Charter. He served as a judge of the International Court of Justice from its beginning in 1946 until 1952. He taught at the Moscow State Institute of International Relations. He was a leading Soviet scholar of international law. He advised the Soviet Union government during the negotiations leading up to the creation of the United Nations.

In 1910, he graduated with a degree in law from the University of St. Petersburg. He served briefly in World War I. In 1917, he joined thee faculty of the Institute for Soviet Construction and Law in Leningrad. In 1938, he defended a doctoral dissertation on the law. In 1942, he moved to Moscow where he taught international law at the Academy of Social Sciences of the Communist Party and at the Higher School of Diplomacy. In 1943, he became professorial chair in international law at the Institute of International Relations of the Ministry of Foreign Affairs.

He played an important role in the creation of the first volume of the Soviet Yearbook of International Law. He played an important role in the Soviet Union's entry into the International Court of Justice and other organizations related to international law.

Krylov was the first Soviet judge to serve on an international court, teach at the Academy of International Law at The Hague, and be elected to the Institut de Droit International .
