= Levi Carneiro =

Brazilian lawyer, jurist and writer

Levi Carniero
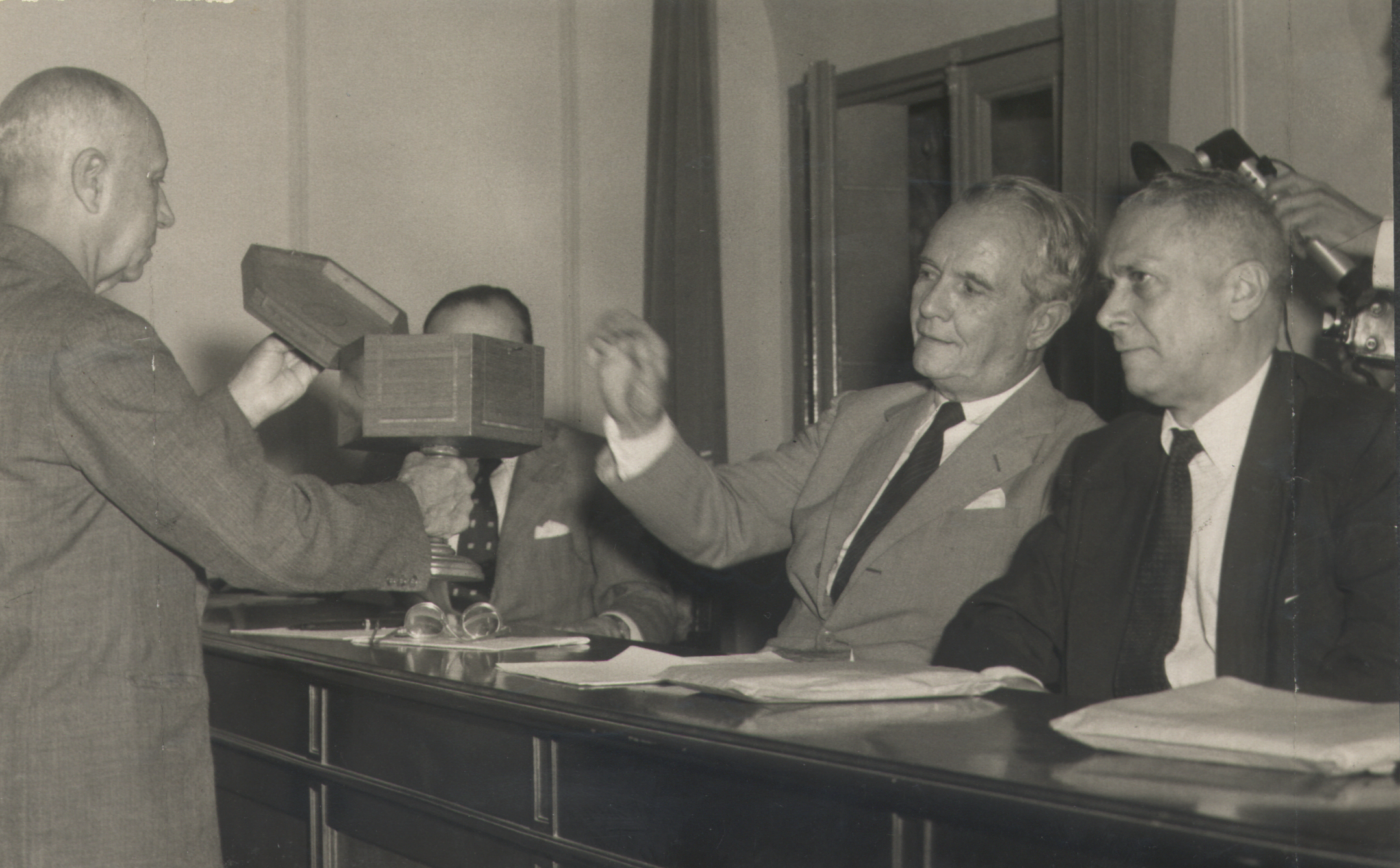
- Born: August 8, 1882; Niterói (Brazil)
- Died: September 5, 1971 (89 years old); Rio de Janeiro (Brazil)

Levi Fernandes Carneiro (Niterói, August 8, 1882 – Rio de Janeiro, September 5, 1971) was a Brazilian lawyer, jurist, and writer. He was a judge of the International Court of Justice.

== Biography ==
He was trained in law at the Free Law School of Rio de Janeiro, currently the National Law School of the Federal University of Rio de Janeiro. Carneiro became one of the most prominent lawyers in Brazil, being one of the founders and the first president of the Brazilian Order of Lawyers, while still presiding over the Brazilian Institute of Lawyers.

He represented Brazil in various legal positions. He was General Counsel of the Republic in the government of Getúlio Vargas, from November 21, 1930, to February 17, 1932. In politics, he was Constituent Deputy in 1934, losing the mandate with the coup that instituted the Estado Novo (Brazil).

He was appointed as judge of the International Court of Justice in The Hague in 1951, serving until 1954.

== Works ==
- A nova legislação da infância (1930);
- Federalismo e judiciarismo (1930);
- Conferências sobre a Constituição (1937);
- O livro de um advogado (1943);
- Na Academia (1943);
- O Direito internacional e a democracia (1945);
- Pareceres do consultor geral da República, 3 vols. (1954);
- Discursos e conferências (1954);
- Dois arautos da democracia: Rui Barbosa e Joaquim Nabuco (1954);
- Uma experiência de parlamentarismo (1965);
- Em defesa de Rui Barbosa (1967);
- Pareceres do consultor jurídico do Ministério das Relações Exteriores (1967).
