= Green Hackworth =

American jurist (1883-1973)

Judge of the International Court of Justice
- In office 1946–1961
- Preceded by: Seat established
- Succeeded by: Philip Jessup

President of the International Court of Justice
- In office 1955–1958
- Preceded by: Arnold McNair
- Succeeded by: Helge Klaestad

1st Legal Adviser to the Department of State
- In office July 1, 1931 – March 1, 1946
- President: Franklin D. Roosevelt; Harry S. Truman
- Preceded by: Position established
- Succeeded by: Charles Fahy

Personal details
- Born: Green Haywood Hackworth; January 23, 1883 Prestonsburg, Kentucky, U.S.
- Died: June 24, 1973 (aged 90) Washington, D.C., U.S.
- Education: Valparaiso University (BA); University of Kentucky (JD); George Washington University (LLB)

Green Haywood Hackworth (Prestonsburg, Kentucky, January 23, 1883 – Washington, DC, June 24, 1973) was an American jurist who served as the first U.S. judge on the International Court of Justice, as President of the International Court of Justice, as the longest running Legal Adviser to the US Department of State (1925 -1946) and as a member of Secretary of State Cordell Hull's inner circle of advisers. Hackworth was instrumental in the development of plans for the post World War II world order and was a key member of the U.S. delegation to the Dumbarton Oaks Conference (1944). He served as a member of the Advisory Committee on Postwar Foreign Policy (1942), as a member of Post War Programs Committee (1944) and as Chairman of the Committee of Jurists that drafted the initial statutes for the International Court of Justice (1945). Hackworth also represented the U.S. Delegation on Committee IV at the United Nations Conference on International Organization where the articles in the United Nations Charter pertaining to the International Court of Justice were finalized.

== Early life and education ==
Green Haywood Hackworth was born in Prestonburg Kentucky and his youth was spent in the area of the Big Sandy River. He received a B.A. degree from Valparaiso University, a Juris Doctor degree from the University of Kentucky and an L.L.B degree from George Washington University. In 1916, after completion of his legal studies, Hackworth secured a job as a law clerk with the U.S. Department of State and in 1918 was promoted to Assistant Solicitor within the department. Although a Democrat, Hackworth was chosen in 1925 by Republican U.S. Secretary of State Charles Evans Hughes, for nomination by the President and subsequent approval by the Senate to become Solicitor of the Department of State.

== Legal Adviser to the U.S. Department of State ==
As the longest running Legal Adviser of the Department of State, Hackworth was relied upon for legal advice by five successive U.S. Secretaries of States: Charles Evans Hughes, Frank B. Kellogg, Henry L. Stimson, Cordell Hull and Edward Stettinius Jr. Hackworth was noted for being a skilled legal draftsman concerning the area of treaty provisions and was a perforce in matters involving the U.S. and its foreign relations from the period of U.S. neutrality to the country's entry into World War II. He provided advice to the U.S. President, the U.S. Secretary of State, members of congress and other departments within the U.S. State Department. As Legal Adviser to the Department of State, Hackworth represented the U.S Government before the International Joint Commission formed by the United States and Canada under the Boundary Waters treaty of 1909. He was a U.S. delegate in 1930 to the First Conference for the Codification of International Law, held at the Hague under the auspices of the League of Nations. Hackworth participated in the 8th Conference of American States (1939) held in Lima, in the 8th Scientific Congress of American States (1940), and in the Inter-American Maritime Conference (1941). Following the outbreak of war in Europe, Hackworth served as Adviser to Secretary of State Hull at the 2nd Meeting of Foreign Ministers of the American Republics (1941) held in Havana.

=== World War Two ===
On Sunday 7 December 1941, Hackworth was in conclave with Secretary of State Hull at the State Department prior to a scheduled meeting with Japanese ambassadors Kichisaburo Nomura and Saburo Kurusu, when at 1:30pm President Roosevelt called to inform Hull of the attack by Japan on Pearl Harbor. Hull consulted with Hackworth and Joseph Ballentine, a State Department expert on the Far East, on whether or not to see the waiting Japanese diplomats. After seeing and then dismissing the diplomats, Hull met with President Roosevelt and then later again with Hackworth where the two discussed the drafting of a proclamation of war between Japan and the United States. As World War II progressed, Hackworth advised Secretary Hull, President Roosevelt, Special (now White House) Counsel Samuel Rosenman, and numerous agencies within the government. His role was to consider legal developments in the laws of war, laws of neutrality, laws of belligerency, and the effects of these laws upon the U.S. and other countries.

=== Post War Planning ===
In February 1942, US Secretary of State Cordell Hull organized the Advisory Committee on Postwar Foreign Policy which was followed by the Special Subcommittee on International Organization of which Hackworth was an integral part. The subcommittee prepared draft proposals that helped clarify the State Department's vague views on a postwar organization. In over 40 meetings in 1943, the Special Subcommittee on International Organization made intensive studies of key issues upon which any plans for a future world organization would pivot. In March 1943, Hull formed the Informal Political Agenda Group which was composed of Hackworth, Edward R. Stettinius, and other members of Hull's inner circle. This group championed a global organization, as opposed to Undersecretary of State Sumner Welles' vision of a regional post war system. In December 1943, the group prepared and delivered to President Roosevelt a detailed post-war plan that became the founding framework of the United Nations. After President Roosevelt approved an outline of the plan, Hull created The Policy Committee and the Post War Programs Committee, composed of Hackworth and other close advisers from the previously established Informal Political Agenda Group, to implement the vision of a United Nations. In 1943, Hackworth served as an adviser to Secretary Hull at the Moscow Conference.

=== The Pullman Porter affair ===
Hull had long been in dispute with his nominal deputy, the Undersecretary Sumner Welles, whom he resented because President Franklin D. Roosevelt trusted and liked Welles considerably better than he did Hull. Welles became in September 1940 the center of a long-running sex scandal when he while intoxicated while riding a train through Virginia made homosexual advances on two Afro-American Pullman porters. Hull used Pullman porter affair as a chance to destroy Welles's career and leaked information about the scandal to William Christian Bullitt Jr., the former ambassador to France who made it his personal mission to force Welles to resign. Hackworth supported Hull against Welles and in January 1943 wrote up a legal opinion stating that the Virginia state government would be well within its rights to indict Welles for violating both the anti-gay and anti-miscegenation laws on Virginia's statue books. Hackworth's legal opinion was promptly leaked to Bullitt who used it as another reason as to why Welles needed to resign or be sacked.

=== The United Nations War Crimes Commission ===
Hackworth took a strong dislike to Herbert Pell, who represented the United States on the United Nations War Crimes Commission (UNWWC), and his plans to prosecute all German officials for war crimes and crimes against humanity. As the long-time State Department legal adviser, Hackworth had wanted to serve as the chief American delegate on the UNWWC and was very jealous that Pell had a job that he desperately wanted for himself. Hackworth in a memo in March 1943 noted that the chairman of the commission was to be the British judge Sir Cecil Hurst, and wrote that the chief American delegate should be someone of "similar caliber" to Hurst, by which he clearly meant himself. He was notably angry about the fact that Pell had no legal experience at all and complained that Pell was only appointed because he was an old friend of President Franklin D. Roosevelt. Hackworth had a high opinion of his legal abilities and greatly resented that Pell as an amateur lawyer was holding a position that he wanted for himself. Adding to the bitterness of their feud was the difference in social status. Pell, who was born into an extremely wealthy family, viewed himself as a "gentleman" and took on a quasi-aristocratic style. He did little to disguise his disdain for Hackworth as a "careerist" lawyer who was no "gentleman". Pell wrote: "Hackworth was well named. He was a little legal hack of no particular attainments. He was manifestly not a born gentleman and acquired very few of the ideas of a gentleman on his way up in the world. His manners were bad, his fingers were dirty, he was clearly unused to good society".

Hackworth objected to Pell's plans to introduce a new category of crimes to indict the Nazis for, namely crimes against humanity, as legally wrong. Hackworth especially objected to Pell's plans for international courts or if necessary American courts to prosecute Nazi officials for crimes against German citizens both before and during the war as violations of international law. He felt that having international courts prosecute the officials of the German government for crimes against its people would create an unwanted precedent for international courts to prosecute American officials for their treatment of black Americans. Hackworth noted under that Pell's definition of crimes against humanity as being state-sanctioned violence against a group for ethnic, religious or racial reasons that American officials could very well be indicted for tolerating the lynching of American blacks, and should be stopped for just that reason alone. Like the Secretary of State, Cordell Hull, Hackworth was from the South and both Hull and Hackworth supported white supremacy. At the Dumbarton Oaks conference, Hackworth had drafted resolutions for the United Nations charter on behalf of the United States government that nominally condemned racism and colonialism, but were so carefully phased in such vapid and banal language as to be legally ineffective. The French sociologist Guillaume Mouralis wrote that Hackworth was opposed to any attempts at having international law be against racism, but rather engage in a "frontal" battle chose to the more subtler method of seeking to "neutralize" such efforts by making the relevant sections of international law be written in such vague and bland language that it would be useless for anyone to invoke such sections.

In a memo he wrote in November 1944 for John J. McCloy, the assistant war secretary, Hackworth stated that Pell was wrong to seek to "exact punishment for the maltreatment by a foreign state within its own territory" of its nationals in both peacetime and wartime. Hackworth concluded that Pell's plans were an "unwarranted interference in the domestic affairs of a foreign nation" and should be stopped immediately. On 7 December 1944, Pell met Hackworth to press to have UNWWC agents attached to the Allied armies advancing in Europe to start collecting evidence of war crimes, a request that Hackworth promptly refused under the grounds that the State Department, the War Department and the Navy Department still needed more time to decide what the U.S. government's policy on war crimes trials would be. Pell also complained to Hackworth that the State Department was taking too long to decide what its policy on war crimes should be, saying he yet to receive any instructions on establishing an international court to try the Nazi leaders. Hackworth told Pell that he needed more to time to decide what to do so "that we might not be accused of taking illegal and strong-armed methods such as those for which we are now condemning the Axis powers". Pell was especially impatient on this matter as he noted it was clear that the Allies were going to win the war and the U.S. Army had already entered the westernmost regions of Germany, saying that time to have a policy on war crimes was now. Pell charged that Hackworth's approach of waiting and waiting to decide what to do constituted a failure of leadership, which led to the meeting ending on an unfriendly note.

In late 1944, Hackworth along with the Acting Secretary of State Joseph Grew played a key role in having Pell fired by excluding Pell's salary from the State Department's request for its budget to Congress for the 1945 fiscal year. Hackworth guessed correctly that most members of Congress would not notice that Pell's position was not included in the budget for 1945 and would just vote for the budget without reading it in its entirety. As Pell's position was not provided in the 1945 budget, he accordingly ceased to work for the State Department. On 9 January 1945, Pell had lunch with Roosevelt at the White House. Afterwards, Pell met with the new Secretary of State Edward Stettinius Jr. and Hackworth, where he learned he had just been fired. A lengthy shouting match between Pell and Hackworth ensured as Pell demanded to know why he had not been informed of his sacking before he met the president. Hackworth told Pell that he represented the president, not the State Department, and it was no business of his why he had been fired, a remark that gravely offended Pell who felt that Hackworth was being dishonest. Pell lashed out at Hackworth as he wrote: "There was no was question that I was the victim of a conspiracy largely engineered by Hackworth and G. Howland Shaw [an assistant secretary of state], I couldn't say who gave the orders and who took them, but they were among the group that deliberately sabotaged the instructions of the President for their own advantage."

=== Dumbarton Oaks Conference ===
Prior to the Dumbarton Oaks conference, the State Department originated the American Planning Group for preparation. This group was divided into three sections and each section was responsible for a different topic that was to be addressed at Dumbarton Oaks. Hackworth headed the second group charged with studying arrangements for the peaceful settlements of international disputes and the development of a world court. At the Dumbarton Oaks Conference, Hackworth chaired a special legal subcommittee that was established to deal with the issue of a world court. The subcommittee used as a base the American draft statute that Hackworth's section had developed prior to the conference. The subcommittee first dealt with the technically complex issue of whether or not the present court should be continued or a new court established and also what the relationship should be of the new court with the new international organization. Hackworth championed the American's view that retaining as much of the existing court statutes as possible should be preferred. However, the Soviets strongly opposed the continuing membership of certain neutral states in the world court and favored the creation of a new tribunal. This dispute and others over the world court were settled at the general U.N. Conference at San Francisco where Hackworth represented the U.S. on Committee IV, which was tasked with finalizing statutes for the International Court of Justice. In 1945 he served as Adviser to Secretary of State Edward Stettinius at the Conference of American States on Problems of War and Peace, held in Mexico City.

== International Court of Justice ==
Hackworth was nominated by three former U.S. Secretaries of State for an initial six-year term on the International Court of Justice (ICJ), which he commenced in 1946. He was subsequently elected to a full nine-year term in 1951. In 1955, he began a three-year term as President of the International Court of Justice, succeeding Sir Arnold McNair of Great Britain.

During his tenure on the Court, Hackworth participated in the adjudication of some 19 contentious cases, and the Court handed down some 10 advisory opinions. Due to Hackworth's experience as a legal draftsman, the task of consolidating views of Court members was frequently assigned to him.

=== Reparation for Injuries Suffered in the Service of the United Nations ===
In the case Reparation for Injuries Suffered in the Service of the United Nations, Hackworth disagreed with the Court in its interpretation of the implied powers doctrine and in his dissent maintained that, "powers not expressed cannot freely be implied. Implied powers flow from a grant of express powers, and are limited by those that are 'necessary' to the exercise of powers expressly granted." He disagreed with the majority in that he felt that the majority used an unduly wide version of the implied powers doctrine by relating the power to be implied not to an express provision but rather to the functions and objectives of the organization concerned.

=== International Court of Justice Rulings ===
Case #	Case name	ICJ Category	Challenger	Defendant	Date of application	Date of disposition	Disposition	Opinion	Appendment
1	Corfu Channel Case	Contentious	UK	Albania	22 May 1947	9 April 1949 “Corfu Channel Case”.Judgement	Majority	None	
2	[Conditions of Admission of a State to Membership in the United Nations]	Advisory	(United Nations) UN General Assembly		24 November 1947	9 April 1949	Opinion on Merits	Majority	None
3	[Reparation for Injuries Suffered in the Service of the United Nations]	Advisory	(United Nations) UN General Assembly		7 December 1948	11 April 1949	Opinion on Merits	Q1a: Majority; Q1b: Dissenting	Dissenting Opinion
4	Fisheries Case	Contentious	UK	Norway	28 September 1949	18 December 1951	Judgment on Merits	Majority	None
5	Asylum Case	Contentious	Colombia	Peru	15 October 1949	20 November 1950	Judgment on Merits	Majority	None
6	[Interpretation of Peace Treaties with Bulgaria, Hungary and Romania]	Advisory	(United Nations) UN General Assembly		31 October 1949	18 July 1950	Opinion on Merits	Majority	None
7	[Competence of the U.N. General Assembly]	Advisory	(United Nations) UN General Assembly		28 November 1949	3 March 1950	Opinion on Merits	Majority	None
8	[International Status of South West Africa]	Advisory	(United Nations) UN General Assembly		27 December 1949	11 July 1950	Opinion on Merits	Majority	None
9	[Rights of Nationals of the United States of America in Morocco]	Contentious	France	United States	28 October 1950	27 August 1952	Judgment on Merits	Dissenting	Dissenting Opinion (joint)
10	Prevention and Punishment of the Crime of Genocide	Advisory	(United Nations) UN General Assembly		20 November 1950	28 May 1951	Opinion on Merits	Majority	None
11	Request for Interpretation in the Asylum Case	Contentious	Colombia	Peru	20 November 1950	27 November 1950	Judgment on Admissibility	Majority	None
12	Haya de la Torre	Contentious	Colombia	Peru	13 December 1950	13 June 1951	Judgment on Merits	Majority	None
13	Ambatielos Case	Contentious	Greece	UK	9 April 1951	19 May 1953	Judgment on Merits	Majority	None
14	Anglo-Iranian Oil Co.	Contentious	United Kingdom	Iran	26 May 1951	22 July 1952	Judgment on Jurisdiction	Dissenting	Dissenting Opinion (joint)
15	Minquiers and Ecrehos Case	Contentious	France	UK	5 December 1951	17 November 1953	Judgment on Merits	Majority	None
16	Nottebohm Case	Contentious	Liechtenstein	Guatemala	17 December 1951	6 April 1955	Judgment on Merits	Majority	None
17	Monetary (Nazi) Gold Removed from Rome in 1943	Contentious	Italy	France; UK; United States	19 May 1953	15 June 1954	Judgment on Jurisdiction	Majority	None
18	.[Electricite de Beyrouth Company Case]	Contentious	France	Lebanon	15 August 1953	29 July 1954	Case Dismissed	N/A	N/A
19	[Compensation Made by the United Nations Administrative Tribunal]	Advisory	(United Nations) UN General Assembly		21 December 1953	13 July 1954	Opinion on Merits	Dissenting	Dissenting Opinion
20	[Voting Procedure - South West Africa]	Advisory	(United Nations) UN General Assembly		6 December 1954	7 June 1955	Opinion on Merits	None	None
21	[Certain Norwegian Loans]	Contentious	France	Norway	6 July 1955	6 July 1957	Judgment on Merits	Majority	None
22	JUDGMENTS OF ADMINISTRATIVE TRIBUNAL OF INTERNATIONAL LABOUR ORGANISATION UPON COMPLAINTS MADE AGAINST UNESCO, Advisory Opinion of 23 October 1956: ICJ Reports 1956, p 77	Advisory	(United Nations) UNESCO		2 December 1955	23 October 1956	Opinion on Merits	Dissenting	Dissenting Opinion
23	[Admissibility of Hearings - South West Africa]	Advisory	(United Nations) UN General Assembly		19 December 1955	1 June 1956	Opinion on Merits	Majority	None
24	[Right of Passage over Indian Territory]	Contentious	Portugal	India	22 December 1955	12 April 1960	Judgment on Merits	Majority	None
25	Convention of 1902 Governing the Guardianship of Infants	Contentious	Netherlands	Sweden	10 July 1957	28 November 1958	Judgment on Merits	Majority	None
26	[Interhandel (Switzerland v. United States)]	Contentious	Switzerland	United States	2 October 1957	21 March 1959	Judgment on Jurisdiction	Majority	Separate Opinion
27	Aerial Incident of 27 July 1955 (Israel v. Bulgaria)	Contentious	Israel	Bulgaria	16 October 1957	26 May 1959	Judgment on Jurisdiction	Majority	None
28	[Sovereignty over Certain Frontier Land]	Contentious	Belgium	Netherlands	27 November 1957	20 June 1959	Judgment on Merits	Majority	None
29	[Arbitral Award Made by the King of Spain on 23 December 1906]	Contentious	Honduras	Nicaragua	1 July 1958	18 November 1960	Judgment on Merits	Majority	None

== Positions ==
1916 - Law Clerk, U.S. Department of State
1918 - Assistant Solicitor, U.S. Department of State
1925 - Solicitor of the Dept. of State, U.S. Department of State,
1931 - Legal Adviser of the Dept. of State, U.S. Department of State
1930 - Member of U.S. Delegation, Conference on the Codification of International Law
1939 - Adviser to U.S. Secretary of State, Meeting of Foreign Ministers of the American Republics
1940 - Member of U.S. Delegation, Conference of American States
1943 - Member of U.S. Delegation, Moscow Conference
1944 - Member of U.S. Delegation, Dumbarton Oaks Conference
1945 - Chairman, Committee of Jurists for Drafting Statutes of the International Court of Justice
1945 - Adviser to US. Delegation, San Francisco Conference on International Organization of the United Nations
1946 - U.S. Judge, International Court of Justice

== Associations ==
- Council on Foreign Relations
- District of Columbia Bar
- U.S. Supreme Court Bar
- Permanent Court of Arbitration
- American Society of International Law

== Publications ==
- "Digest of International Law" 1940-1944 (eight volumes)

== See also ==
- Marjorie M. Whiteman
