= Massimo Pilotti =

Italian jurist

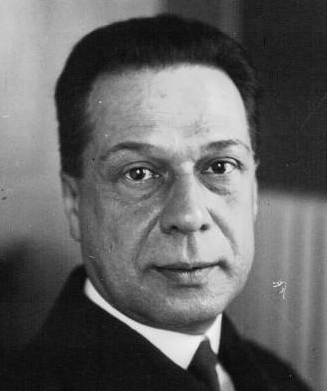
Pilotti in 1927

Massimo Pilotti (1 August 1879 – 29 April 1962) was an Italian jurist and judge. Pilotti was the first President of the European Court of Justice at Luxembourg.

== Early life ==
Massimo Pilotti became a judge in 1901. In 1913, he was appointed a Judge of the District Court in Rome. Judge of the Court of Appeal, Rome in 1923. Judge of the Court of Cassation in 1926. First President of the Court of Appeal in Trieste in 1930. Principal State Prosecutor at the Court of Cassation in 1944. President of the Public Waters Appeal Court in 1948. First Honorary President of the Italian Court of Cassation in 1949. Deputy Secretary-General of the League of Nations (1932–37). President of the International Institute for the Unification of Private Law in 1944. Member of the Permanent Court of Arbitration in The Hague in 1949. First President of the European Court of Justice from 1952 to 1958.

== See also ==
- List of members of the European Court of Justice

Legal offices
Preceded by office created	President of the European Court of Justice; 1952–1958	Succeeded by Andreas Matthias Donner
