= Bohdan Winiarski =

Polish politician and jurist (1884–1969)

His Excellency Bohdan Winiarski
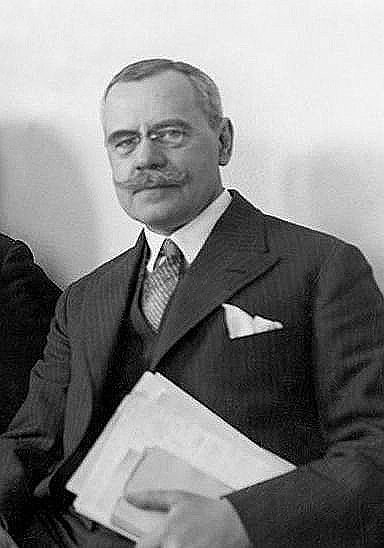
- Winiarski in the Sejm, February 1932

President of the International Court of Justice
- In office 1961–1964
- Preceded by: Helge Klæstad
- Succeeded by: Percy Spender

Judge of the International Court of Justice
- In office 1946–1967
- Preceded by: Position established
- Succeeded by: Manfred Lachs

Personal details
- Born: 27 April 1884 Bohdanów, Congress Poland, Russian Empire (now Poland)
- Died: 4 December 1969 (aged 85) Poznań, Poland
- Education: Jagiellonian University; University of Warsaw; University of Paris; Heidelberg University

Bohdan Stefan Winiarski (27 April 1884 – 4 December 1969) was a Polish politician and jurist who served as President of the International Court of Justice from 1961 to 1964.

== Life and career ==
Winiarski studied law nationally at the Jagiellonian University and the University of Warsaw and did studies of the same studies overseas at the University of Paris and Heidelberg University. After obtaining Ph.D., Winiarski started working at the University of Poznań, obtaining ranks of deputy professor in 1921 and associate professor in 1922. In 1930, Winiarski became full professor of public international law and from 1936 to 1939 served as dean of the Faculty of Law and Economics. During those years, he also served as vice chairman of the League of Nations Communications and Transport Committee and chairman of the League of Nations Inland Navigation Law Committee. During World War II he settled in Great Britain where he served as the President of the Bank of Poland under London Government. In 1946, Winiarski was elected to the International Court of Justice in The Hague, and then served as its president from 1961 to 1964. Winiarski was also a professor at the Academy of International Law in The Hague, and was a member of the Institut de Droit International, the Polish Academy of Learning and the Polish Academy of Sciences.
