= Charles de Visscher =

Belgian international law judge

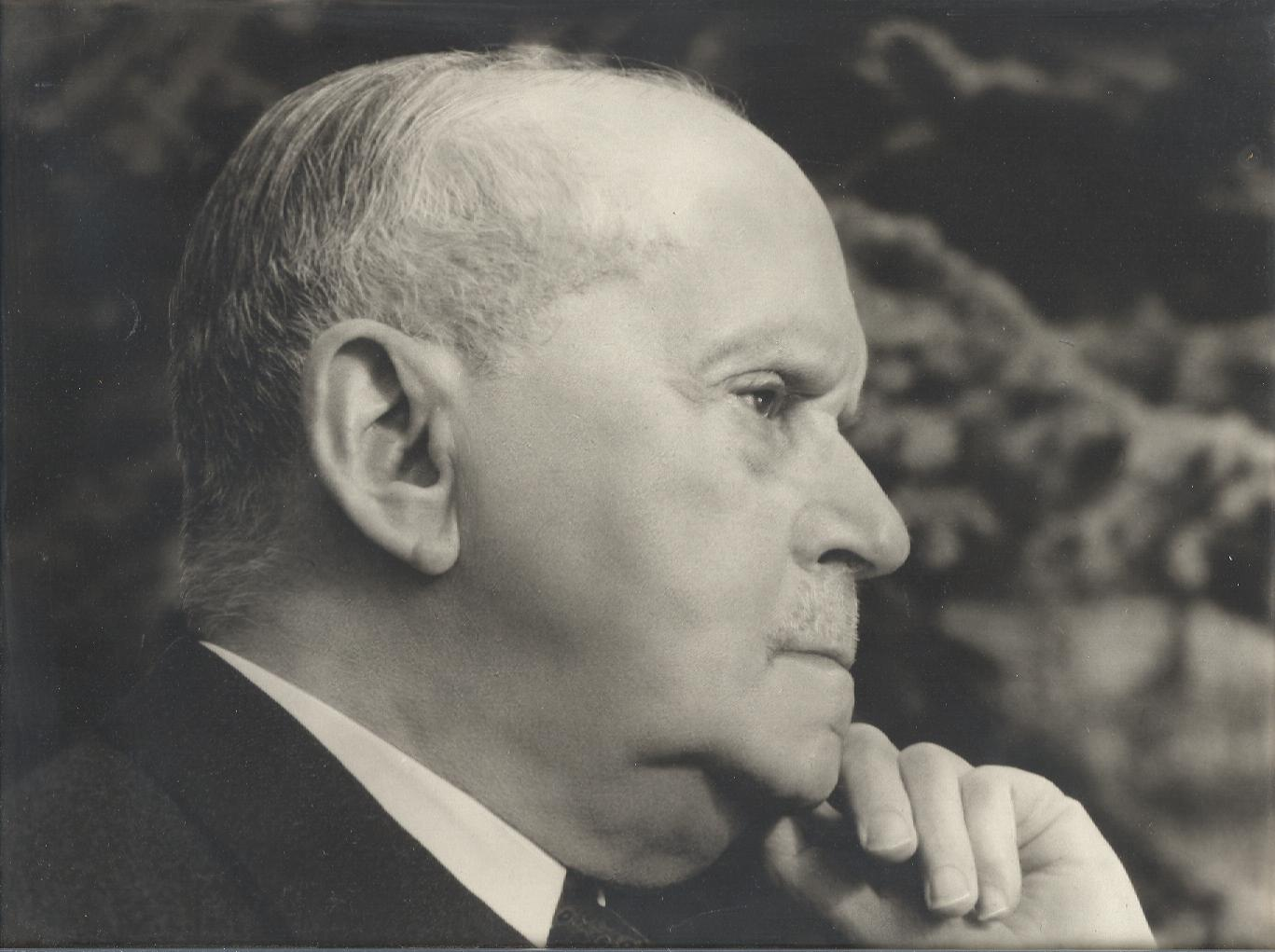

Personal details
- Born: 2 August 1884 Ghent, Belgium
- Died: 2 January 1973 (aged 88) Brussels, Belgium
- Spouse: Hélène de Visscher (née Mertens)
- Relations: Ferdinand de Visscher (brother)
- Children: 7

Charles Marie Joseph Désiré de Visscher (2 August 1884 – 2 January 1973) was a Belgian scholar and practitioner of international law, as well as judge on the Permanent Court of International Justice and International Court of Justice.

== Early life and education ==
Charles de Visscher was born in Ghent on 2 August 1884. Orphaned at twelve years old following the death of his father, a professor at Ghent University, Charles de Visscher and his younger brother Ferdinand (died 1964) were placed in the care of Abbé Watté.

The elder de Visscher attended Ghent University where he earned his Docteur en Droit—at the time, an initial law degree—graduating 8 October 1907. He earned a second degree, this time in political science, graduating 2 February 1909.

== Career ==
In 1911, de Visscher became professor at the Ghent University faculty of law. He taught courses on civil law, criminal law and private international law, succeeding Albéric Rolin.

After World War I, de Visscher worked as a legal advisor to the Belgian Foreign Ministry. In 1924, he was elected Dean of the Ghent University faculty of law. In 1931, de Visscher left Ghent University due to the Flamenpolitik, and began teaching at the Catholic University of Louvain.

First appearing before the Permanent Court of International Justice was in 1927, de Visscher served as counsel for the Romanian government during their dispute over the Danube Commission. In 1931, de Visscher represented Poland in Access to, or Anchorage in, the Port of Danzig of Polish War Vessels, and subsequently in Treatment of Polish Nationals and Other Persons of Polish Origin or Speech in the Danzig Territory. His final appearance as counsel before the Permanent Court was in 1933, where he represented Denmark in Legal Status of Eastern Greenland.

Following the death of Judge Edouard Rolin-Jaequemyns in 1936, de Visscher was appointed as Belgium's ad hoc judge in the Permanent Court of International Justice. He was elected a full judge in 1937, in which position he served until the court's dissolution. He subsequently served on the International Court of Justice from 1946 until 1951. Couvreur states that the consensus is de Visscher's not being re-elected, while unexpected, was due to "the subtle interplay of political equilibria", rather than any particular failing of de Visscher himself. After leaving judicial work, de Visscher returned to academia, but also participated in arbitral bodies. In 1954 de Visscher became a foreign member of the Royal Netherlands Academy of Arts and Sciences.

In 1966, the American Society of International Law awarded de Visscher the Manley O. Hudson Medal.

== Personal life ==
Charles de Visscher's wife Hélène (née Mertens) died on 2 August 1958. The couple's marriage bore seven children. The eldest, Jacques de Visscher, died near the Albert Canal on 10 May 1940 while on a mission. Two sons became priests, while another became a monk. Paul de Visscher went on to teach law at the Catholic University of Louvain. Two grandchildren also teach law: Françoise Leurquin-de Visscher and François Ost. He died in Brussels on 2 January 1973.
