= Alejandro Álvarez =

Chilean international lawyer and judge (1868–1960)

- Alejandro Álvarez Jofré
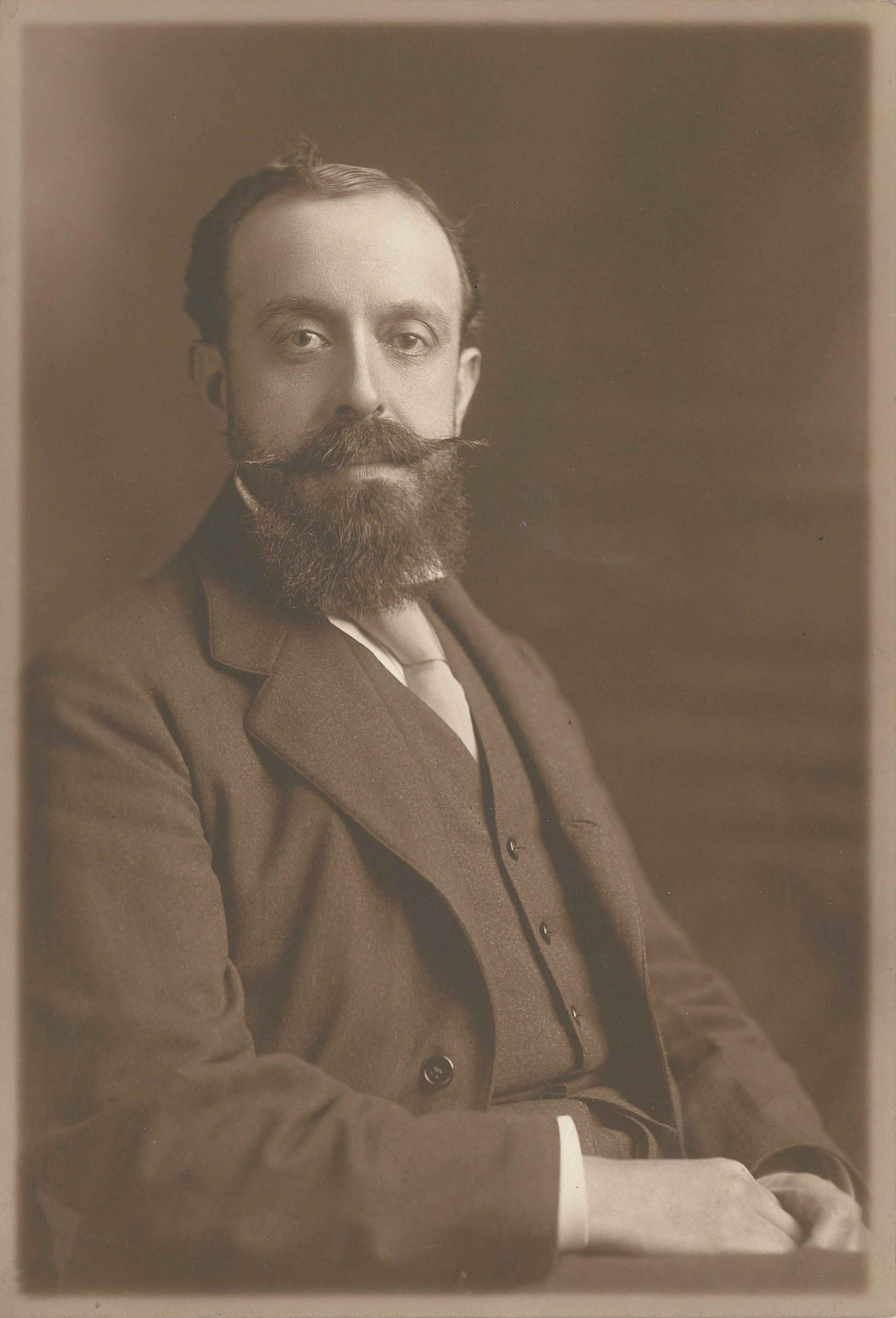
- Education: University of Chile
- Occupations: Lawyer, diplomat, professor, writer and judge.

Manuel Alejandro Álvarez Jofré (February 9, 1868 – July 19, 1960) was a Chilean professor of international law and a judge at the International Court of Justice. He had been a founding member of the American Institute of International Law and of the Institute of Higher International Studies, from the Faculty of Law of Paris. He served as a judge in the International Court of Justice in 1946–1955.

== Career ==
Alejandro Álvarez is considered one of the most renowned international lawyers in Latin America in the 20th century He qualified as a lawyer at the University of Chile in1892 and later received his doctorate from the University of Paris

Álvarez was a member of the Institut de Droit international from 1913, of the Real Academia de Ciencias Morales y Políticas of Spain from 1922 and of the Institut de France from 1923

In addition, he was an honorary member of the International Law Association and the Pan-European Union from 1929. In 1959, he was appointed ambassador for life in recognition of his services to his home country. The Universidad de Buenos Aires (1941), the University of Strasbourg (1947) and the Universidad de Chile (1958) awarded him honorary doctorates. In 1932, 1933 and 1934 he was nominated for the Nobel Peace Prize for his work. In 2006, the specialist journal "Leiden Journal of International Law" published a series of articles on his life and work in the fourth issue of the 19th year. In the city of Ovalle in the Chilean region of Coquimbo, a school has borne his name since 1960.

== Academic professional life ==
From 1901 he worked as a professor of comparative civil law at the University of Chile and from 1906 as a legal advisor to the Chilean Foreign Ministry where he represented Chile at international conferences. From 1946 to 1955 he was the only Chilean to serve as a judge at the International Court of Justice in The Hague.

== International Law for a New World ==
As a jurist specializing in international law with wide experience as a judge he became appalled at the injustice arising from the Cold War and colonization by the then two emergent superpowers that held the world in thrall between the traditional American imperialism and the advance of Russian communism, especially the consequent extortion of less developed countries with valuable natural resources.

== Works ==
- Une Nouvelle conception des études juridiques et de la codification du droit civil
- American Problems in International Law
- Le Droit international américain
- The Monroe Doctrine: its Importance in the International Life of the States of the New World
- Le Droit international nouveau dans ses rapports avec la vie actuelle des peuples
