= Zafrulla Khan =

Pakistani diplomat (1893–1985)

Sir Zafrulla Khan KCSI
- ظفر اللہ خان
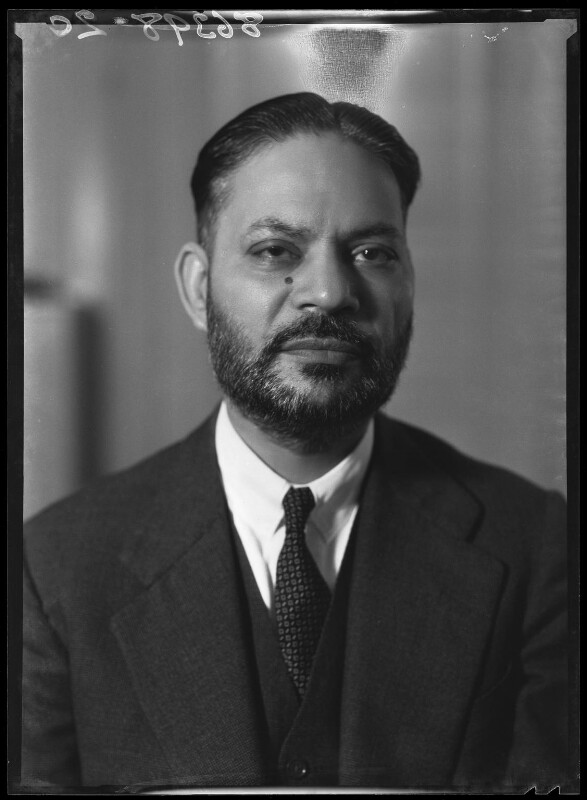
- Khan in 1939

1st Minister for Foreign Affairs
- In office 27 December 1947 – 24 October 1954
- Prime Minister: Liaquat Ali Khan; Khawaja Nazimuddin; Muhammad Ali Bogra
- Preceded by: Liaquat Ali Khan
- Succeeded by: Muhammad Ali Bogra

President of the United Nations General Assembly
- In office 1961–1962
- Preceded by: Mongi Slim
- Succeeded by: Carlos Sosa Rodríguez

President of the International Court of Justice
- In office 1970–1973
- Deputy: Fouad Ammoun
- Preceded by: José Bustamante y Rivero
- Succeeded by: Manfred Lachs

Permanent Representative of Pakistan to the United Nations
- In office 1961–1964
- Preceded by: Said Hasan
- Succeeded by: Syed Amjad Ali

Personal details
- Born: 6 February 1893 Sialkot District, Punjab Province, British India
- Died: 1 September 1985 (aged 92) Lahore, Punjab, Pakistan
- Party: AIML (before 1947); PML (1947–1958)
- Education: Government College, Lahore; King's College London

Sir Muhammad Zafrulla Khan (Note: Urdu: محمد ظفر اللہ خان) KCSI (6 February 1893 – 1 September 1985) was a Pakistani independence activist, diplomat and jurist who served as the first Minister for Foreign Affairs from 1947 to 1954. After serving as foreign minister, he continued his international career and is the only Pakistani to-date to preside over the International Court of Justice. He also served as the President of the United Nations General Assembly. He is the only person to-date to serve as the President of both UN General Assembly and the International Court of Justice.

Zafarullah became one of the most vocal proponents of Pakistan and led the case for the separate nation in the Radcliffe Commission which drew the countries of modern-day South Asia. He moved to Karachi in August 1947 and became a member of Pakistan's first cabinet, serving as the country's debut foreign minister under the Liaquat administration. He remained Pakistan's top diplomat until 1954 when he left to serve on the International Court of Justice and remained on the court as a judge until 1958 when he became the court's vice president. He left the Hague in 1961 to become the Permanent Representative of Pakistan to the United Nations, a position he served until 1964.

Before he served at the UN, he fought for Palestinian interest thus it made him a hero well respected by the Arab masses. In 1963, he became president of UN General Assembly State of Palestine in a de facto capacity. He left the UN in 1964 to return to the ICJ and, in 1970, he became the first and only Pakistani to serve as the President of the International Court of Justice, a position he maintained until 1973. He returned to Pakistan and retired in Lahore where he died in 1985 at the age of 92. Khan is considered a prominent figure in Pakistan. He authored several books on Islam both in Urdu and English.

== Early life and education ==
Chaudhry Zafrullah Khan was born on 6 February 1893 in Sialkot, Punjab into a Jat Punjabi family. His paternal family were Zamindars of Sahi Jat extraction based around Daska and were of the headman of their village the other being a Sahi Sikh Sardar. Khan's family had suffered a decline during the Sikh era due to government favoritism towards Sikhs and the early death of his Great Grandfather which resulted in his grandfather, Chaudhry Sikandar Khan to become the village headman in his adolescence. However, over time, Chaudhry Sikander Khan regained much of the family's status and became a widely respected around Daska. Sikandar Khan's son and Zafarullah Khan's father, Chaudhry Nasrullah Khan became part of the first wave of Landed Gentry of Sialkot to receive a western education and became one of the most prominent lawyers of Sialkot district. Both of his parents were deeply religious members of the Ahmadiyya Muslim movement. Khan's mother, Hussain Bibi, belonged to a well to do Zamindar family hailing from the Bajwa clan of Jats. She was his father's maternal first cousin. Hussain Bibi and Zafarullah Khan were incredibly close and Khan called her the most powerful influence in his life.

He studied at Government College, Lahore and received his L.L.B. from King's College London in 1914. He was called to the bar at Lincoln's Inn, London. He practised law in Sialkot and Lahore, became a member of the Punjab Legislative Council in 1926.

== Career ==
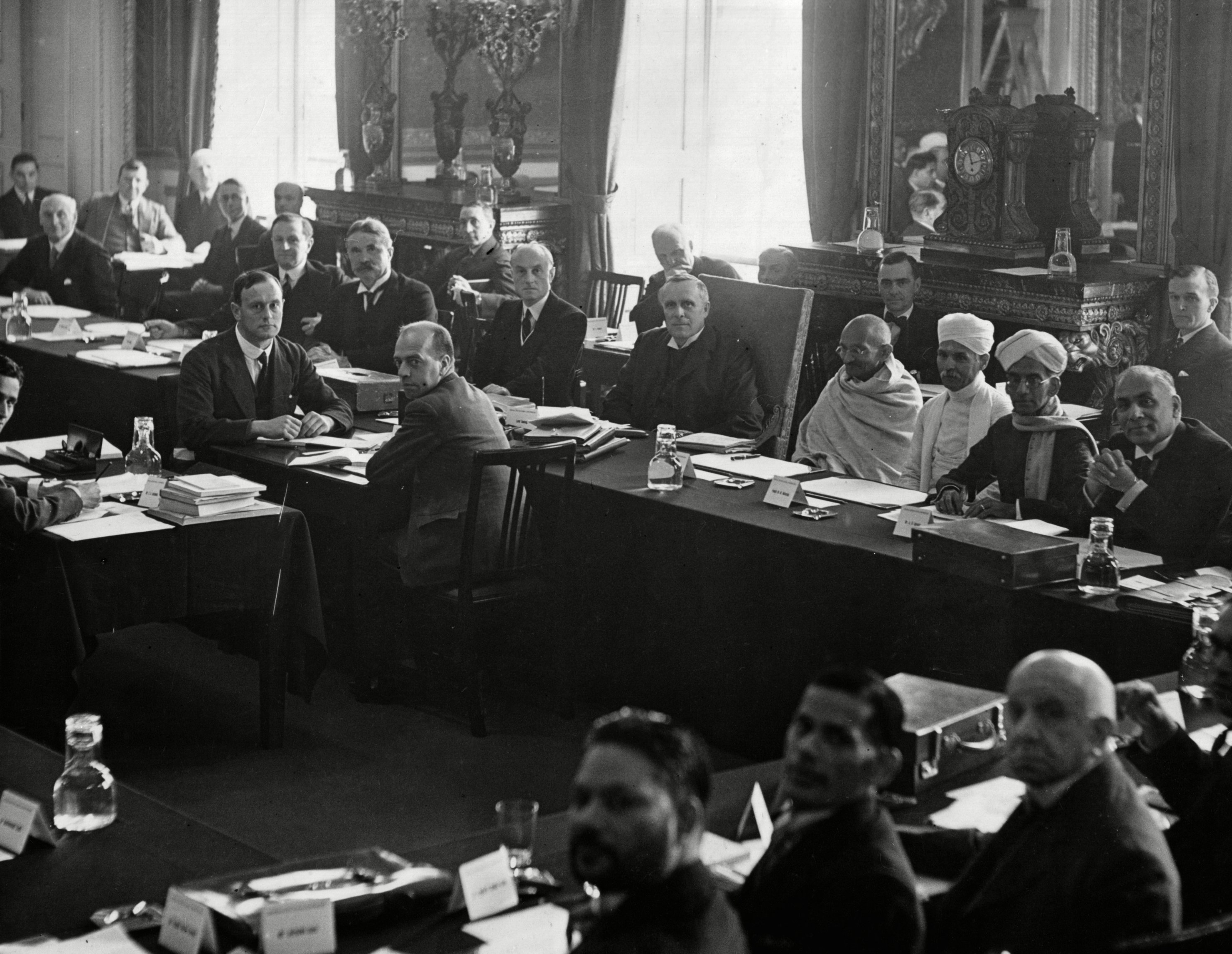
The Second Round Table Conference, 7 September 1931, with Zafarullah Khan seated to the rear of the table (closest to the camera)

Muhammad Zafarullah Khan practiced law in Colonial India. He was the counsel for the Ahmadiyya cause in two landmark judgements. In 1916, the Patna High Court gave a verdict on the case Hakim Khalil Ahmad Vs. Malik Israfil which gave Ahmadis the right to use religious places of Islam for prayers. In 1922, the Madras High Court acknowledged Ahmadiyya as being a part of Islam in its verdict on the case Narantakath Avullah v. Parakkal Mammu.

Zafarullah was elected a member of the Punjab Legislative Council in 1926 and presided at the Delhi meeting of the All-India Muslim League in 1931, where he advocated the cause of the Indian Muslims through his presidential address. He participated at the Round Table Conferences held from 1930 to 1932 and became the Minister of Railways in May 1935. In 1939, he represented India at the League of Nations. He was appointed the Agent General of India in China in 1942 and represented India as the Indian Government's nominee at the Commonwealth Relations Conference in 1945, where he spoke on India's cause for freedom.

From 1935 to 1941, he was a member of the Executive Council of the Viceroy of India. Sir Zafarullah Khan prepared a note on the future of the dominion status of India analyzing the future prospects of the "Dominion Status". It took into account concerns of Muslims and ultimately proposed a plan to divide the subcontinent. This note was sent to Lord Zetland, Secretary of State for India, as referred in a letter by Lord Linlithgow dated 12 March 1940.

Lord Linlithgow, however, had not a complete grasp of contents in the analytic note prepared by Sir Zafarullah Khan at the time it was sent to the Secretary of India. A copy of this note was sent to Jinnah. Sir Zafarullah Khan's proposal of a two-state solution for the Indian Federation was adopted by the Muslim League with a view to give it full publicity in the forthcoming session at Lahore 22–24 March.

In September 1941, Zafarullah Khan was appointed a Judge of the Federal Court of India, a position he held until June 1947. At the request of Muhammad Ali Jinnah, he represented the Muslim League in July 1947 before the Radcliffe Boundary Commission and presented the case of the Muslims in a highly commendable manner. Zafarullah Khan advised the Nawab of Junagadh that if he decided to join his state with Pakistan, it would be both moral and legal. The Nawab then proceeded to announce his decision.

Khan led the International Court of Justice at The Hague.

In October 1947, Zafarullah Khan represented Pakistan at the United Nations General Assembly as head of the Pakistani delegation and advocated the position of the Muslim world on the Palestinian issue. On October 28, he was appointed chairman of Subcommittee 2 of the Ad Hoc Committee on the Palestinian Question upon the resignation of the previous chairman. That year, he was appointed Pakistan's first Foreign Minister, a post he held for seven years. Between 1948 and 1954, he also represented Pakistan at the United Nations Security Council where he advocated for the liberation of occupied Kashmir, Libya, Northern Ireland, Eritrea, Somalia, Sudan, Tunisia, Morocco, and Indonesia.

As Foreign Minister, he represented Pakistan at the Manila Treaty Conference in September 1954. Support for the Manila Pact in Pakistan was divided, with West Pakistan dominated army and a handful of leaders in favour of this, while most elected members of the Constituent Assembly from West Pakistan and all of the Assembly members from East Pakistan opposed it. Zafarullah signed the Manila Pact, committing to Pakistan's accession to the Southeast Asia Treaty Organization (SEATO).

In 1954, he became a Judge at the International Court of Justice (ICJ) in The Hague, a position he held until 1961. He was the vice-president of the International Court of Justice from 1958 to 1961. Between 1961 and 1964, he was Pakistan's Permanent Representative at the United Nations. From 1962 to 1964, he was also the President of the UN General Assembly. He later rejoined the ICJ as a judge from 1964 to 1973, serving as president from 1970 to 1973.

In 1982, the first ever Provisional World Parliament (PWP) met in Brighton, U.K. at the Royal Pavilion was presided over by him.

== Religion ==
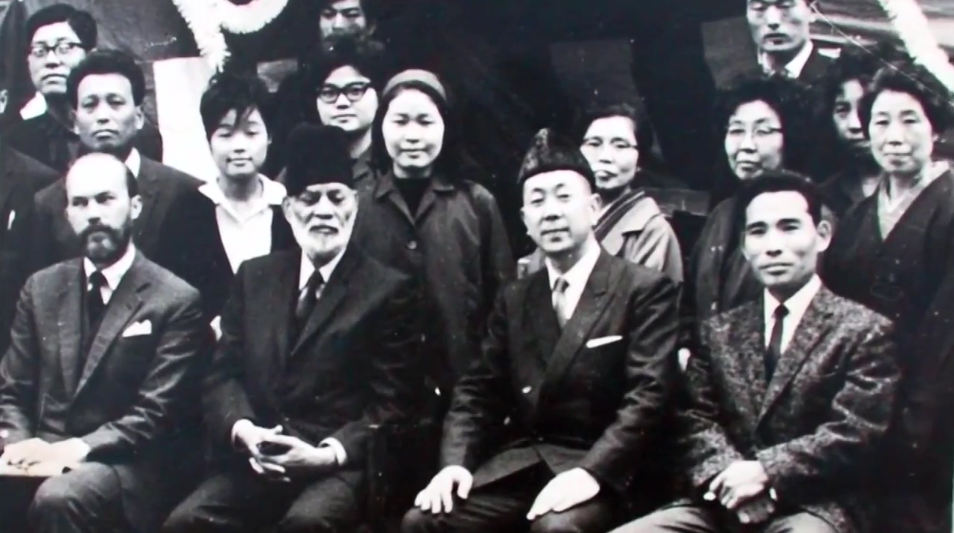
Zafarullah Khan in Japan, along with Japanese converts to the Ahmadiyya Muslim movement.

As an Ahmadi Muslim, Zafarullah Khan held the office of Ameer (president) of the Lahore, Pakistan chapter of the Community from 1919 to 1935. He was a proud Ahmadi Muslim, and faced much criticism due to this, with riots in Lahore under the Khatme Nabuwat Party in 1953, demanded for him to be removed from his position. He served as Secretary to Khalifatul Masih II, the second successor of Mirza Ghulam Ahmad, at the Majlis-e-Shura (Consultative Council) for the first time in 1924, and continued to do so for 17 more sessions. In addition, he was a member of the delegation which represented the Ahmadiyya Muslim Community at the All Parties Conference held in 1924. In 1927, he acted successfully as representative counsel for the Muslims of the Punjab in the contempt of court case against the Muslim Outlook.

As Pakistan's first Foreign Minister, Zafarullah Khan addressed the Constituent Assembly of Pakistan in the days leading up to the passing of the Objectives Resolution. The Objectives Resolution, which combined features of both Western and Islamic democracy, is one of the most important documents in the constitutional history of Pakistan. It was designed to provide equal rights for all citizens of Pakistan, regardless of their race, religion or background. Zafarullah Khan was quoted as saying:

It is a matter of great sorrow that, mainly through mistaken notions of zeal, the Muslims have during the period of decline earned for themselves an unenviable reputation for intolerance. But that is not the fault of Islam. Islam has from the beginning proclaimed and inculcated the widest tolerance. For instance, so far as freedom of conscience is concerned the Quran says "There shall be no compulsion" of faith ...

— Muhammad Zafarullah Khan, addressing the Constituent Assembly of Pakistan, c. 1949

In March 1958, Zafarullah Khan performed Umrah and, at the same time, visited the shrine of Muhammad in Medina, Saudi Arabia. During his visit, he met with the King of Saudi Arabia Saud of Saudi Arabia, and stayed at the Royal Palace as a personal guest of the King. In 1967, he returned to Saudi Arabia to perform Hajj, a religious duty that must be carried out at least once in a lifetime by every able-bodied Muslim who can afford to do so.

== Legacy ==
Khan's legacy has been hailed and his paramount role in the creation of Pakistan has been celebrated in the history of Pakistan. He is popularly known by his title Sir Zafarullah Khan, and openly acknowledged that he belonged to the Ahmadiyya Muslim Community. He was selected by Muhammad Ali Jinnah as the first Foreign Minister of Pakistan. He was one of the most influential, skilled, and passionate diplomats of his time.

In a personal tribute, King Hussein bin Tallal of Jordan said:

"He was indeed a champion of the Arab cause and his ceaseless efforts whether among the Muslim and non-aligned countries or at the International Court of Justice will remain forever a shining example of a great man truly dedicated to our faith and civilization."

— Review of Religions, September/October 1986, pg. 6

Muhammad Fadhel al-Jamali, a former Prime Minister of Iraq, in a tribute on his death, wrote:

"In fact, it was not possible for any Arab, however capable and competent he may be, to serve the cause of Palestine in a manner in which this distinguished and great man dedicated himself. What was the result of the debate in the United Nations is another matter. But, it must be acknowledged that Zafrulla Khan occupies a pre-eminent position in defending the Palestinians in this dispute. We expect from all Arabs and followers of Islam that they will never forget this great Muslim fighter. After Palestine, the services of this man for the independence of Libya also deserves admiration. In the United Nations, his struggle for the rights of Arabs formed the basis of firm and lasting friendship between us."

— Al-Sabah, 10 October 1985

An editorial in Dawn of Karachi stated that:

"He earned the abiding respect and admiration of the Arab and other Muslim nations as a defender of their interests."

— Dawn editorial, 3 September 1985

== Bibliography ==
=== Books ===
- The Excellent Exemplar Muhammad: The Messenger of Allah. London Mosque. 1962. p. 65.
- The Message of Islam. Archived from the original on 25 June 2016.
- Victory of Prayer Over Prejudice. London Mosque.
- Letter to a Dear One (PDF). Islam International Publications. 2001. p. 116. ISBN 0-9656449-4-4.
- Hazrat Maulvi Nooruddeen Khalifatul Masih I (PDF). Islam International Publications. 2006. p. 350. ISBN 1-85372-848-9.
- Islam and Human Rights (PDF). Islam International Publications. 1967. p. 79. ISBN 1-85372-040-2.
- Wisdom of the Holy Prophet (PDF). Islam International Publications. 1967. p. 91. ISBN 1-85372-030-5.
- Islam – Its Meaning for Modern Man (PDF). Islam International Publications. 1962. p. 386. ISBN 0-7100-0341-2.
- Punishment of Apostacy in Islam. Islam International Publications.
- Women in Islam (PDF). Islam International Publications. 1991. p. 39. ISBN 1-85372-035-6.
- Muhammad: Seal of the Prophets. Routledge & Kegan Paul. 1980.
- My Mother (PDF). London Mosque. 1978. p. 117. Archived from the original (PDF) on 28 December 2010.
- Deliverance from the Cross (PDF). London Mosque. 1978. p. 110. ISBN 0-85525-014-3.
- Islam and Modern Family (Audio Book). Archived from the original on 27 February 2017.

=== Speeches ===
- Khan, Muhammad Zafarullah (10 September 1958). The Contribution of Islam to the Solution of World Problems (Speech). 16th Congress of International Association for Religious Freedom. Chicago, USA. Archived from the original on 27 February 2017.

== Notes ==
Political offices
Preceded by Liaquat Ali Khan	Minister of Foreign Affairs; 1947–1954	Succeeded by Muhammad Ali Bogra
Diplomatic posts
Preceded by Aly Khan	Ambassador to the United Nations; 1961–1964	Succeeded by Amjad Ali
Preceded by Mongi Slim	President of the United Nations General Assembly; 1962–1963	Succeeded by Carlos Sosa Rodriguez
Preceded by Feodor Kozhevnikov	President of the International Court of Justice; 1970–1973	Succeeded by Hersch Lauterpacht
