= Jean Spiropoulos =

Greek lawyer

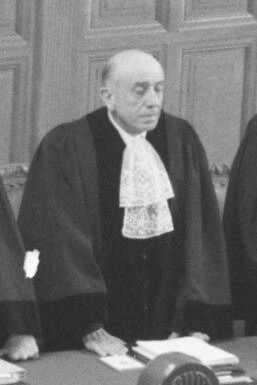
Jean Spiropoulos (1961).jpg

Jean Spiropoulos, or originally Ioannis Georgiou Spyropoulos (Greek: Ιωάννης Σπυρόπουλος, 16 October 1896 – 7 August 1972) was a Greek expert in international law.

He studied law at the Universities of Zürich and Leipzig. From 1928 onward, he taught Public International law at the Law School of the Aristotle University and several universities in Greece. From 1949 to 1957, he served as member of the International Law Commission and from 1958 to 1967, he served as judge at the International Court of Justice. (Since Mr. Spiropoulos also obtained an absolute majority of votes in the Security Council, he has been declared elected as a member of the International Court of Justice on 1 October 1957.)

At the 1st session of the International Law Commission in 1949, he sought to grant greater powers to the commission in choosing topics for its deliberations over the objections of those who sought to give greater emphasis to decisions by the UN General Assembly over such matters.

He served in 1951 as special rapporteur on the issue of definition of aggression.

== Legal philosophy ==
Spiropoulos took part in the formulation of the Nuremberg principles in 1950. Regarding crimes against humanity, he believed that, contrary to the trend at the Nürnberg Trials to define the Nazi party as a criminal organization, it was impossible to determine legally the extent of culpability of governments or other organizations, and sought to define culpability of individuals only. He also considered acts of individuals inciting to civil strife in another country as crimes under international law, and also viewed organized terrorism as such.

== Works (partial list) ==
- Jean Spiropoulos, Ausweisung und Internierung feindlicher Staatsangehöriger (1922)
- Jean Spiropoulos, Die De-facto-Regierung im Völkerrecht (1926)
- Jean Spiropoulos, L'individu en Droit International (1928)
- Jean Spiropoulos, Manual Droit International Public (1933)
- Jean Spiropoulos, Théorie Générale du Droit International. Paris, Librairie Générale de Droit et de Jurisprudence, 1930.
- Jean Spiropoulos, Traité théorique et pratique de droit international public. Paris, Librairie générale de droit et de jurisprudence, 1933.

== Bibliography ==
- Dimitri S. Constantopoulos, Jean Spiropoulos. Sa vie et son œuvre. "Le Monde Diplomatique". Juin 1958.
- Festschrift für Jean Spiropoulos. Grundprobleme des internationalen Rechts. Problèmes fondamentaux du Droit International. Fundamental Problems of International Law. Bonn, Schimmelbusch 1957.
