= John Erskine Read =

Canadian judge (1888–1973)

3rd Dean of Dalhousie Law School
- In office 1924–1929
- Preceded by: Donald Alexander MacRae
- Succeeded by: Sidney Earle Smith

Member of the International Court of Justice
- In office 1946–1958
- Preceded by: seat established
- Succeeded by: Percy Spender

Personal details
- Born: July 5, 1888 Halifax, Nova Scotia
- Died: December 23, 1973 (aged 85) Toronto, Ontario

John Erskine Read, OC (July 5, 1888 – December 23, 1973) was a Canadian lawyer, civil servant, and the only Canadian judge elected to the International Court of Justice.

== Education ==
Born in Halifax, Nova Scotia, Read graduated from the Dalhousie Law School in 1909. He completed post-graduate studies at Columbia University before receiving a Rhodes Scholarship. He received a Bachelor of Arts degree and a Bachelor of Civil Law degree from University College, Oxford. In 1913, he was called to the Nova Scotia bar and practiced law with the firm of Harris, Henry, Rogers, and Harris. During World War I, he served with the Canadian Field Artillery where he was wounded and achieved the rank of Major.

== Profession ==
After the war, in 1920, he joined the Faculty of Law at Dalhousie University. From 1924 to 1929, he was the Dean of the faculty. In 1929, he was appointed Legal Advisor of the Department of External Affairs and rose to become a Deputy Undersecretary of State. While Legal Advisor, he was heavily involved with the Trail Smelter dispute. In 1942, Read devised a method to permit a extraterritorial space for the birth for Princess Margriet of the Netherlands to ensure she was not born on foreign soil, which would have made her ineligible for the royal succession. In 1946, he was elected a member of the International Court of Justice. He was re-appointed for a second term and served until 1958. Returning to Canada, he taught in the Faculty of Law of the University of Ottawa.

== Honours ==
In 1967, he was made an Officer of the Order of Canada "for his services in the profession of law". In 1968, he was awarded an honorary degree from the University of Alberta. He was the first recipient of the John E. Read Medal, awarded by the Canadian Council on International Law.
