= Abdel Hamid Badawi =

Egyptian legislator

Abdel Hamid Badawi Pasha
- عبد الحميد بدوي باشا
- Born: 13 March 1887; Alexandria, Egypt
- Died: 4 August 1965 (aged 78); Alexandria, Egypt
- Occupations: Judge, International Court of Justice

Abdel Hamid Badawi Pasha (13 March 1887 – 4 August 1965) was born in Alexandria, Egypt. He was a prominent jurisprudent and legislator on both the national and international arenas.

Amongst many of the responsibilities that he undertook in his career in Egypt, he served as Minister of Finance and later as Minister of Foreign Affairs, both in the 1940s. During his term as Minister of Foreign Affairs he headed the Egyptian delegation to the UN in San Francisco and was a co-signor of the UN charter on behalf of Egypt.

In 1946, he was selected to serve as Judge at the International Court of Justice where he served until his death on 4 August 1965.

== Early academic career ==
In 1908, Badawi earned his Law License degree from the Egyptian University in Cairo, Egypt. After serving one year as District Attorney in Tanta, Egypt, in 1909 he was sent by the Egyptian Government to France to study for his Doctorate degree which he completed in 1912 at Grenoble University, France. Upon his return to Egypt in 1912, he was appointed Law Professor at the Egyptian University in Cairo, Egypt where he served until 1916.

== Professional career in Egypt ==
In 1916, Badawi joined the Ministry of Justice where he served until 1920 as deputy director of the Egyptian Courts Division. Subsequently, he was selected to serve in key government positions which included: civil courts judge, secretary general of the council of ministers, councilor at the Litigation of the State (Contentieux de l'etat) Court (when he participated in drafting the 1923 Egyptian Constitution), head of the Litigation of the State Court (1926-1940), Minister of Finance (1940-1942), and minister of foreign affairs (1945-1946). In 1945 he headed the Egyptian delegation to the UN Conference on International Organization and was co-signor of the UN Charter on 26 June 1945.

== International career ==
In 1946, Badawi was elected as judge at the International Court of Justice (ICJ) where he served as judge and Vice President (1955-1958) until his death in 1965. During his career at the ICJ, Dr. Badawi participated in many international contentious cases.

Political offices
Preceded by Mahmoud an-Nukrashi Pasha	Minister of Foreign Affairs (Egypt); 1945–1946	Succeeded by Ahmed Lutfi el-Sayed
