= Milovan Zoričić =

Milovan Zoričić (1884 in Zagreb – 1971) was a Croatian football official and criminal judge.

Zoričić was one of the founders of HAŠK Zagreb in 1904. He translated the rules of football into Croatian in 1908. He also worked as a referee and in 1912 he became the first president of the Croatian Football Federation.

By profession Zoričić practiced law. He was a judge at the International Court of Justice from 1946 to 1958.

== Sources ==
- Zoričić, Milovan (in Croatian)
