= Hsu Mo =

Chinese lawyer, politician and diplomat

- 徐謨
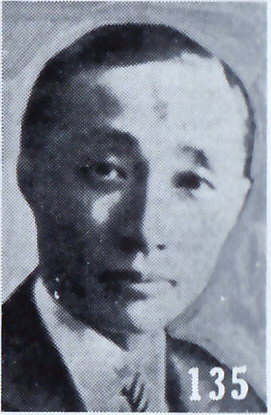

Chinese Ambassador to Turkey
- In office March 1945 – March 1947
- Preceded by: Tsou Snang-yu
- Succeeded by: Ti Tsun Li

Chinese Ambassador to Australia
- In office September 1941 – January 1945
- Preceded by: Term Established
- Succeeded by: Cheng Yi-tung

Personal details
- Born: 22 October 1893 Suzhou, China
- Died: 28 June 1956 (aged 62) the Hague, Netherlands
- Education: Peiyang University, George Washington University, University of Melbourne

Chinese name
- Simplified Chinese: 徐謨
- Traditional Chinese: 徐默
Transcriptions
Standard Mandarin
- Hanyu Pinyin: Xú Mó

Hsu Mo (Chinese: 徐謨; pinyin: Xú Mó; Wade–Giles: Hsu Mo; October 22, 1893 – June 28, 1956) was a Chinese lawyer, politician and diplomat. He worked from 1931 to 1941 as deputy foreign minister of his country, as ambassador to Australia and to Turkey, and from 1946 until his death as a judge at the International Court of Justice.

== Life ==
Hsu Mo was born in 1893 in Suzhou, China, and studied law at Peiyang University and at George Washington University. He received his doctorate in Australia at the University of Melbourne. In the 1920s, he worked first as a professor of international law and international relations at Nankai University and later as a judge in various district courts. In 1928, he moved to the Chinese Foreign Ministry, where he worked as a consultant and later as Director of the European-American and Asian Department. Three years later, he became Deputy Minister of Foreign Affairs. After ten years in this position, he became Extraordinary and Plenipotentiary Ambassador to Australia in 1941 and from 1944 to 1946 he was ambassador of his homeland to Turkey.

After the end of World War II, in April 1945, he participated on the United Nations Committee of Jurists in Washington DC, tasked with preparing draft statutes for the then contemplated International Court of Justice. He also served as the rapporteur of the Committee on Chapter VI of the United Nations Charter on the Regulations for the Peaceful Settlement of Disputes. A year later he was elected a judge of the International Court of Justice, where he worked until his death. His successor was his compatriot Wellington Koo.

Hsu Mo became a member of the Institut de Droit International in 1948. He died in 1956, in The Hague.
