= Jules Basdevant =

French legal scholar

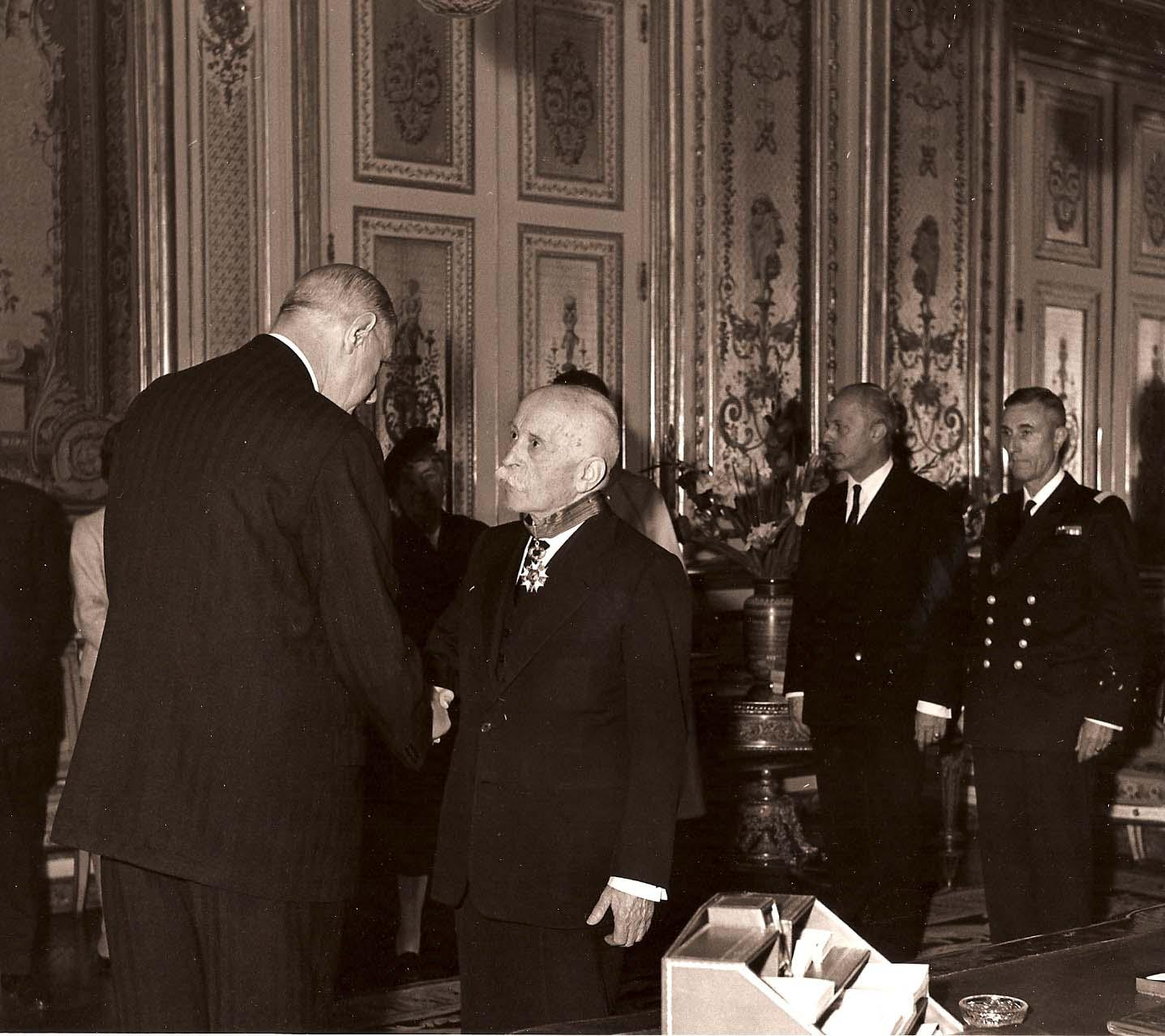
- The Commandeur badge of the Ordre national de la Légion d'honneur being awarded to Basdevant (center) by Charles de Gaulle (left), 1964

Judge of International Court of Justice
- In office 1946–1964
- Preceded by: None
- Succeeded by: André Gros

President, International Court of Justice
- In office 1949–1952
- Preceded by: José Gustavo Guerrero
- Succeeded by: Sir Arnold McNair

Vice President, International Court of Justice
- In office 1946–1949
- Preceded by: None
- Succeeded by: José Gustavo Guerrero

Personal details
- Born: April 15, 1877 Anost, Saône-et-Loire, France
- Died: March 17, 1968 (aged 90)
- Children: Suzanne Bastid
- Occupation: Law professor, Jurist

Jules Basdevant (April 15, 1877 – March 17, 1968 in Anost) was a French law professor.

He was born in Anost, Saône-et-Loire, a village in the Parc naturel régional du Morvan about halfway between Paris and Lyon in eastern France.

After obtaining his Ph.D. in law, he began teaching at the law faculty in Paris, in February 1903, as an agrégé. He was later transferred to the law faculty of Rennes where he lectured from 1903 to 1907. He then went to Grenoble, where he was a professor until 1918, when he went back to Paris. Basdevant was promoted several times; in 1922 as professor of international law and historical treaties, in 1924 as professor of people's law and also became a technical expert for the French delegation at the Peace preliminary conference of 1919.

He worked for the Foreign Affairs Department from 1930 to 1941 as a law consultant. He was elected a member of the Academy of Political and Moral Sciences in 1944. In 1946 took up an inaugural seat on the International Court of Justice, a position he held until 1964. He served as the Court's first Vice President, from 1946 to 1949 and as president from 1949 to 1952.

Jules Basdevant is the father of Suzanne Bastid.
