= Helge Klæstad =

Norwegian composer and judge

Helge Klæstad (6 December 1885 – 23 May 1965) was a Norwegian judge.

He was born in Levanger. He took the dr.juris degree in 1921, and was a Supreme Court Justice from 1929 to 1946, except for the period between December 1940 and May 1945, during the German occupation of Norway. In 1946 he was appointed to serve at the International Court of Justice, which he presided from 1958 until retiring in 1961.

Klæstad was also active as a composer.
