= Judges of the Permanent Court of International Justice =

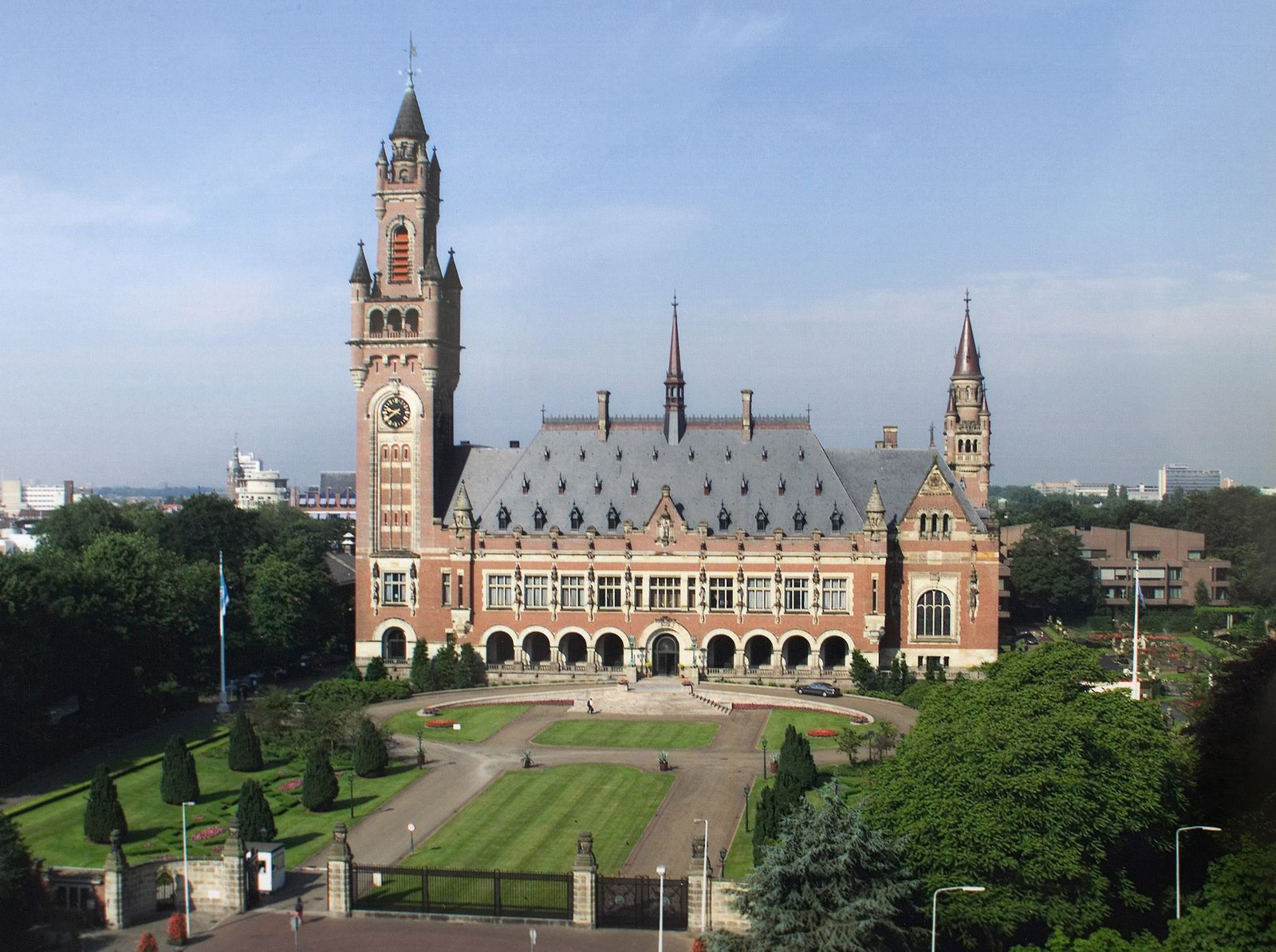
The Peace Palace in The Hague, Netherlands, home to the Permanent Court of International Justice

The Permanent Court of International Justice was an international court attached to the League of Nations. The Court initially consisted of 11 judges and 4 deputy judges, recommended by member states of the League of Nations to the Secretary General of the League of Nations, who would put them before the Council and Assembly for election. The Council and Assembly were to bear in mind that the elected panel of judges was to represent every major legal tradition in the League, along with "every major civilization". Each member state was allowed to recommend 4 potential judges, with a maximum of 2 from its own nation. Judges were elected by a straight majority vote, held independently in the Council and Assembly. The judges served for a period of nine years, with their term limits all expiring at the same time, necessitating a completely new set of elections. The judges were independent and rid themselves of their nationality for the purposes of hearing cases, owing allegiance to no individual member state, although it was forbidden to have more than one judge from the same state. As a sign of their independence from national ties, judges were given full diplomatic immunity when engaged in Court business. The only requirements for a judge were "high moral character" and that they have "the qualifications required in their respective countries [for] the highest judicial offices" or be "jurisconsults of recognized competence in international law".

The first panel was elected on 14 September 1921, with Deputy Judges elected 2 days later. In 1930 the number of judges was increased to 15 and a second set of elections were held on 25 September. Judges continued to hold their posts, despite the Court not sitting for most of the 1940s due to the Second World War, until they resigned en masse in October 1945. Judges were paid 15,000 Dutch florins a year, with daily expenses of 50 florins to pay for living expenses, and an additional 45,000 florins for the President, who was required to live at The Hague. Travelling expenses were also provided, and a "duty allowance" of 100 florins was provided when the court was sitting, with 150 for the Vice-President. This duty allowance was limited to 20,000 florins a year for the judges and 30,000 florins for the Vice-President; as such, it provided for 200 days of court hearings, with no allowance provided if the court sat for longer. The deputy judges received no salary, but when called up for service were provided with travel expenses, 50 florins a day for living expenses and 150 florins a day as a duty allowance.

== List of judges ==
Nationality	Name	Term as a judge	Other roles	Reason for termination	Notes
Japan	Mineichirō Adachi	15 January 1931 — 28 December 1934	President 1931–1933	Died	
Spain	Rafael Altamira y Crevea	January 1922 — October 1945		Court resigned en masse	
Italy	Dionisio Anzilotti	January 1922 — October 1945	President 1928–1930	Court resigned en masse	
Brazil	Ruy Barbosa	January 1922 — 1 March 1923		Died	
Cuba	Antonio Sánchez de Bustamante y Sirven	January 1922 — October 1945		Court resigned en masse	
China	Wang Ch'ung-hui	15 January 1931 — 15 January 1936		Resigned	
Finland	Rafael Erich	26 September 1938 — October 1945		Court resigned en masse	
Netherlands	Willem van Eysinga	15 January 1931 — October 1945		Court resigned en masse	
United Kingdom	Robert Finlay	January 1922 — 9 March 1929		Died	
France	Henri Fromageot	19 September 1929 — October 1945		Court resigned en masse	
El Salvador	José Gustavo Guerrero	15 January 1931 — October 1945	Vice President 1931–1936, President 1936–1946	Court resigned en masse	
Sweden	Åke Hammarskjöld	8 October 1936 — 7 July 1937		Died	
Switzerland	Max Huber	January 1922 — 6 December 1930	President 1925–1927, Vice President 1928–1931	Not re-elected	
United States	Manley Ottmer Hudson	8 October 1931 — October 1945		Court resigned en masse	
United States	Charles Evans Hughes	8 September 1928 — 15 February 1930		Resigned	
United Kingdom	Cecil Hurst	19 September 1929 — October 1945	President 1934–1936, Vice President 1936–1946	Court resigned en masse	
United States	Frank B. Kellogg	25 September 1930 — 9 September 1935		Resigned	
Netherlands	Bernard Loder	January 1922 — 6 December 1930	President 1922–1924	Not re-elected	
United States	John Bassett Moore	January 1922 — 11 April 1928		Resigned	
Japan	Harukazu Nagaoka	17 September 1935 — 15 January 1942		Resigned	
Romania	Demetre Negulesco	15 January 1931 — October 1945		Court resigned en masse	
Denmark	Didrik Nyholm	January 1922 — 6 December 1930		Not re-elected	
Japan	Yorozu Oda	January 1922 — 6 December 1930		Not re-elected	
Belgium	Edouard Rolin-Jaequemyns	15 January 1931 — 11 July 1936		Died	
Poland	Michał Jan Rostworowski	15 January 1931 — 24 March 1940		Died	
Germany	Walther Schücking	15 January 1931 — 25 August 1935		Died	
Brazil	Epitácio da Silva Pessoa	10 September 1923 — 6 December 1930		Not re-elected	
China	Cheng Tien-Hsi	8 October 1936 — October 1945		Court resigned en masse	
Colombia	Francisco José Urrutia	15 January 1931 — 9 January 1942		Resigned	
Belgium	Charles De Visscher	27 May 1937 — October 1945		Court resigned en masse	
France	André Weiss	January 1922 — 31 August 1928	Vice President 1922–1928	Died	

== List of deputy judges ==
Nationality	Name	Term as a deputy judge	Reason for termination	Notes
Norway	Frederik Beichmann	30 January 1920 — 6 December 1930	Not re-elected	
China	Wang Ch'ung-hui	30 January 1920 — 6 December 1930	Not re-elected	
Finland	Rafael Erich	15 January 1931 — 1 February 1936	Post abolished	
Portugal	José Caeiro da Mata	15 January 1931 — 1 February 1936	Post abolished	
Romania	Demetre Negulesco	30 January 1920 — 6 December 1930	Not re-elected	
Yugoslavia	Mileta Novaković	15 January 1931 — 1 February 1936	Post abolished	
Austria	Josef Redlich	15 January 1931 — 1 February 1936	Post abolished	
Yugoslavia	Mihailo Jovanović	30 January 1920 — 6 December 1930	Not re-elected	

== Bibliography ==
- Hudson, Manley O. (1930). "The Election of Members of the Permanent Court of International Justice". The American Journal of International Law. 25 (4). American Society of International Law. ISSN 0002-9300.
- Hudson, Manley O. (1931). "The Ninth Year of the Permanent Court of International Justice". The American Journal of International Law. 25 (1). American Society of International Law. ISSN 0002-9300.
- Hudson, Manley O. (1957). "The Succession of the International Court of Justice to the Permanent Court of International". The American Journal of International Law. 51 (3). American Society of International Law. doi:10.2307/2195063. ISSN 0002-9300. JSTOR 2195063. S2CID 146855383.
- Moore, John Bassett (1922). "The Organization of the Permanent Court of International Justice". Columbia Law Review. 22 (6). Columbia Law School. doi:10.2307/1111551. ISSN 0010-1958. JSTOR 1111551.
- Scott, James Brown (1921). "The Election of Judges for the Permanent Court of International Justice". The American Journal of International Law. 15 (4). American Society of International Law. ISSN 0002-9300.
