= Diversion of Water from the Meuse case =

Case Relating to the Diversion of the Water from the Meuse
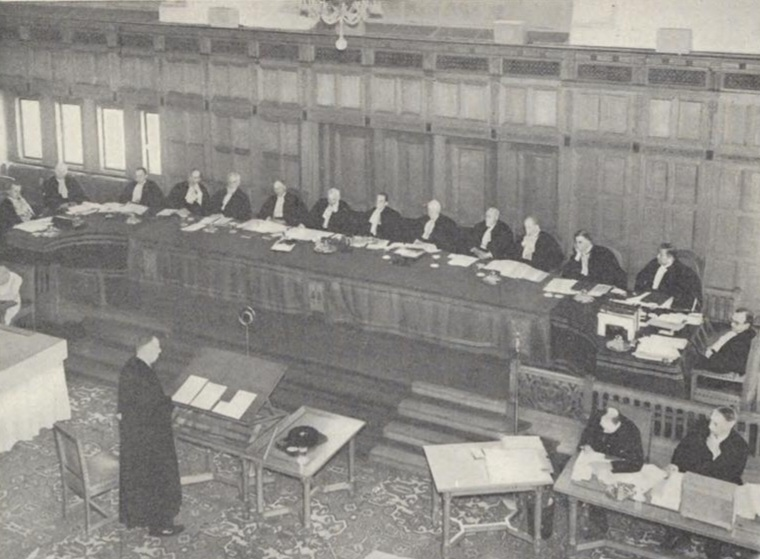
- Court: Permanent Court of International Justice
- Full case name: The Diversion of the Water From the Meuse (Netherlands v. Belgium)
- Decided: June 28, 1937
- Citations: Diversion of Water from the Meuse (Netherlands v. Belgium), Judgement, 1937 P.C.I.J. (Ser. A/B) No. 70 (June 28)
- Claim: Belgium violated a 1863 treaty on the use of the Meuse River

Case history
- Argument: Oral argument

Ruling
- Belgium did not commit any violation in developing the river resources as it had been doing

Court membership
- President: José Gustavo Guerrero (President); Sir Cecil Hurst (Vice-president)
- Associate judges: Michał Jan Rostworowski · Henri Fromageot · Antonio Sánchez de Bustamante y Sirven · Rafael Altamira y Crevea · Dionisio Anzilotti · Demetre Negulesco · Willem van Eysinga · Harukazu Nagaoka · Cheng Tien-Hsi · Manley Ottmer Hudson · Charles de Visscher

Case opinions
- Majority: Guerrero
- Concurrence: Hudson
- Concur/dissent: van Eysinga
- Concur/dissent: Altamira y Crevea
- Dissent: Hurst
- Dissent: Anzilotti

Diversion of Water from the Meuse case (Netherlands v. Belgium) 1937 P.C.I.J. (Ser. A/B) No. 70 (June 28) was a judgment of the Permanent Court of International Justice on terms of treaties.

An 1863 treaty between Belgium and the Netherlands regulated water use of the Meuse River to ensure sufficient flow for navigation and irrigation. As the economic use of the river valley developed, increased pressure was placed on the river. In 1937, the Netherlands brought proceedings, alleging that Belgium’s use of the river had expanded beyond the terms of the treaty. Belgium filed counterclaims against expansion projects by the Netherlands.

The Court concluded that the Treaty did not prevent either State from developing the river resources as they had been doing.
