= Lotus case =

1927 criminal trial

The Lotus Case
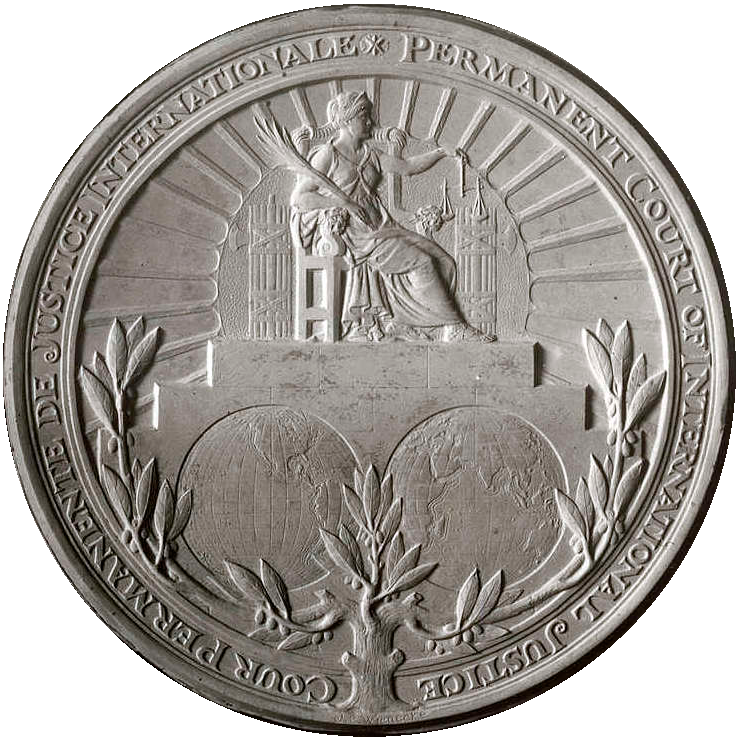
- Court: Permanent Court of International Justice
- Full case name: The Case of the S.S. "Lotus" (France v. Turkey)
- Decided: 7 September 1927
- Claim: Turkey has illegally arrested Mr. Demons, captain of the Lotus

Ruling
- There is no rule of international law reserving jurisdiction of crimes committed in high seas to the flag State; Turkey did not violate any law in arresting Mr. Demons

Court membership
- President: Max Huber (President); André Weiss (Vice-president)
- Associate judges: Bernard Loder · Robert Finlay · John Bassett Moore · Didrik Nyholm · Antonio Sánchez de Bustamante y Sirven · Rafael Altamira y Crevea · Yorozu Oda · Dionisio Anzilotti · Epitácio da Silva Pessoa

Case opinions
- Majority: Huber, joined by Bassett Moore, Sánchez de Bustamante y Sirven, Oda, Anzilotti, Da Silva Pessoa
- Dissent: Loder
- Dissent: Weiss
- Dissent: Finlay
- Dissent: Nyholm
- Dissent: Altamira

The Lotus case was an international legal case involving France and Turkey in front of the Permanent Court of International Justice. The case is known for establishing the so-called "Lotus principle" in international law.

== The case ==
=== Background ===
On 2 August 1926 the S.S. Lotus, a French steamer, collided with the S.S. Bozkourt, a Turkish steamer, in a region just north of Mytilene (Greece). As a result of the accident, eight Turkish nationals aboard in the Bozkurt drowned when the vessel was torn apart by the Lotus.

Turkey proceeded to arrest the Lotus's captain, Mr. Demons; he was subsequently charged and condemned by the Turkish Courts for the damage and the deaths caused by the accident.

=== Appeal to the PCIJ ===
France protested against Turkish actions, claiming that, since the crime was committed in high seas, any charge against Mr. Demons belonged to the flag State jurisdiction, i.e. to the French judiciary.

On 7 September 1927, the case was presented before the Permanent Court of International Justice, the judicial branch of the League of Nations, the predecessor of the United Nations. France accused Turkey of illegally arresting Mr. Demons in violation of international law.

France proffered case law, through which it attempted to show at least state practice in support of its position. However, those cases involved ships that both flew the flag of the same state. The Court, therefore, by a bare majority, rejected France's position, stating that there was no rule to that effect in international law.

=== Lotus principle ===
The Lotus principle or Lotus approach, usually considered a foundation of international law, says that sovereign states may act in any way they wish so long as they do not contravene an explicit prohibition. The application of this principle – an outgrowth of the Lotus case – to future incidents raising the issue of jurisdiction over people on the high seas was changed by article 11 of the Convention on the High Seas. The convention, held in Geneva in 1958, laid emphasis on the fact that only the flag state or the state of which the alleged offender was a national had jurisdiction over sailors regarding incidents occurring on the high seas.

=== Subsequent evolution of international law ===
This "flag state principle" has since also been implemented in United Nations Convention on the Law of the Sea (UNCLOS), e.g. in article 92 and, in regards to enforcement of environmental legislation, article 217(1).

The principle has also been used in arguments against the reasons of the United States of America for opposing the existence of the International Criminal Court (ICC).

== Mahmut Esat Bozkurt ==
In the court the Turkish side was represented by Mahmut Esat Bozkurt, the Minister of Justice. In 1934, when Turkey adopted the formal surname system, Mahmut Esat chose the surname Bozkurt as a reminiscence of the case.

== See also ==
- Everything which is not forbidden is allowed
- United Nations Convention on the Law of the Sea

== Resources ==
- The Case of The S.S. Lotus - full text of the judgment
- The Case of The S.S. Lotus - combined French and English version
- The Case of The S.S. Lotus - Spanish version / Versión en español
