= Chorzów Factory case =

International law case

The Chorzów Factory case
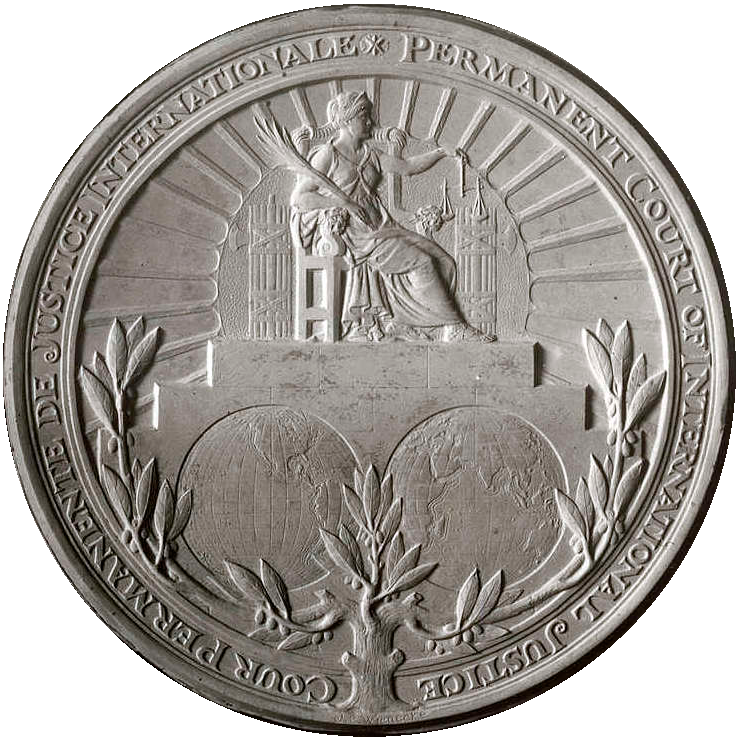
- Court: Permanent Court of International Justice
- Full case name: Case Concerning the Factory at Chorzów (Germany v. Poland)
- Decided: 26 July 1927
- Citations: Factory at Chorzów (Germany v. Poland), Jurisdiction, 1927 P.C.I.J. (Ser. A) No. 9 (26 July).

Case history
- Argument: Oral argument

Court membership
- President: Max Huber (President); Bernard Loder (Former President)
- Associate judges: Robert Finlay · Didrik Nyholm · John Bassett Moore · Antonio Sánchez de Bustamante y Sirven · Rafael Altamira y Crevea · Yorozu Oda · Dionisio Anzilotti · Epitácio da Silva Pessoa · Mihailo Jovanović · Ernst Rabel · Ludwik Ehrlich

Case opinions
- Majority: Huber
- Dissent: Ehrlich

The Chorzów Factory case (Germany v. Poland) 1927 P.C.I.J. (Ser. A) No. 9 (26 July) (French: Affaire relative à l'usine de Chorzów) was a case before the Permanent Court of International Justice in 1927. It was an early authority in international law that established a number of precedents in international law.

== Background ==
In the Upper Silesia plebiscite a majority of 31,864 voters voted to remain in Germany while 10,764 votes were given for Poland. Following three Silesian Uprisings, the eastern part of Upper Silesia, including Chorzów and Królewska Huta, was separated from Germany and awarded to Poland in 1922. Migrations of people followed. Because of its strategic value, the case of the nitrate factory Oberschlesische Stickstoffwerke was argued for years before the Permanent Court of International Justice, finally setting some new legal precedents on what is "just" in international relations.

== Significance ==
The Court held that:

- A State is held responsible for expropriation of alien property
- Under international law, a nation is responsible for acts of government organs or officers.
- It is a general principle of international law that reparation is to be made for violations of international law. Regarding this, the PCIJ held: "reparation must, as far as possible, wipe out all the consequences of the illegal act and reestablish the situation which would, in all probability, have existed if that act had not been committed". The reparation should thereby consist of a restitution in kind, or if this is impossible, the payment of a sum that corresponds to the value as compensation.

== See also ==
- Chorzów during the Interwar Period
