= S.S. Wimbledon case =

1923 judgment of the Permanent Court of International Justice

The case of the S.S. Wimbledon, Britain et al. v. Germany (1923) PCIJ Series A01, is a judgment of the Permanent Court of International Justice, rendered on 17 August 1923. The case primarily dealt with issues pertaining to attributes of sovereignty, treaty obligations qua internal law, and the jurisprudence related to international canals.

== Background ==
A British steamship, the Wimbledon, was time-chartered by a French company, Les Affréteurs réunis, which was based in Paris. According to the terms of the charter, the vessel had taken on board at Salonica 4,200 tons of munitions and artillery stores consigned to the Polish naval base at Danzig (an independent country but with rights of access for Poland under the Treaty of Versailles, today Gdańsk, Poland). On 21 March 1921, Wimbledon arrived at the Kiel Canal, but the Director of Canal Traffic refused permission to pass through by basing his refusal upon the neutrality orders issued by Germany in connection with the Polish–Soviet War. The French Ambassador at Berlin requested the German government to withdraw the prohibition and to allow Wimbledon to pass through the Kiel Canal, in conformity with Article 380 of the Treaty of Versailles. The German government replied that it would not allow a vessel with a cargo of munitions and artillery stores consigned to the Polish Military Mission at Danzig to pass through the canal, as the German Neutrality Orders prohibited the transit of cargoes of this kind destined for Poland or Russia, and Article 380 of the Treaty of Versailles was not an obstacle to the application of such orders to the Kiel Canal. The Société des Affréteurs réunis telegraphed to the captain of the S.S. Wimbledon, ordering him to continue his voyage by the Danish Straits. The vessel weighed anchor on 1 April and, proceeding by Skagen, reached Danzig, its port of destination on 6 April; it had been detained for eleven days, and had taken two extra days for its deviation.

The British, French, Italian and Japanese governments brought the action that was heard from 16 January 1923 to 17 August 1923.

The Court had these members:

- Bernard Loder, President
- André Weiss, Vice-president
- Robert Finlay, 1st Viscount Finlay
- Didrik Nyholm
- John Bassett Moore
- Antonio Sánchez de Bustamante y Sirven
- Rafael Altamira y Crevea
- Yorozu Oda
- Dionisio Anzilotti
- Max Huber
- Wang Ch'ung-hui (Deputy-Judge)
- Walther Schücking

The court considered Articles 380 to 386 of the Treaty of Versailles and Articles 2 and 7 of the Hague Convention of 1907 .

== Decision ==
The court first had to consider Poland's application to intervene, which it allowed.

It then considered the substantive issue in the case and found that Germany was perfectly free to regulate its neutrality in the war. However, it found that the canal had ceased to be an internal navigable waterway of Germany. Germany thus had a definite duty of allowing the passage of the Wimbledon through the Kiel Canal, and its neutrality did not oblige the prohibition of allowing the passage.

Judges Anzilotti, Huber and Schücking dissented.
