= José Gustavo Guerrero =

Salvadoran diplomat and jurist (1876–1958)

Doctor José Gustavo Guerrero
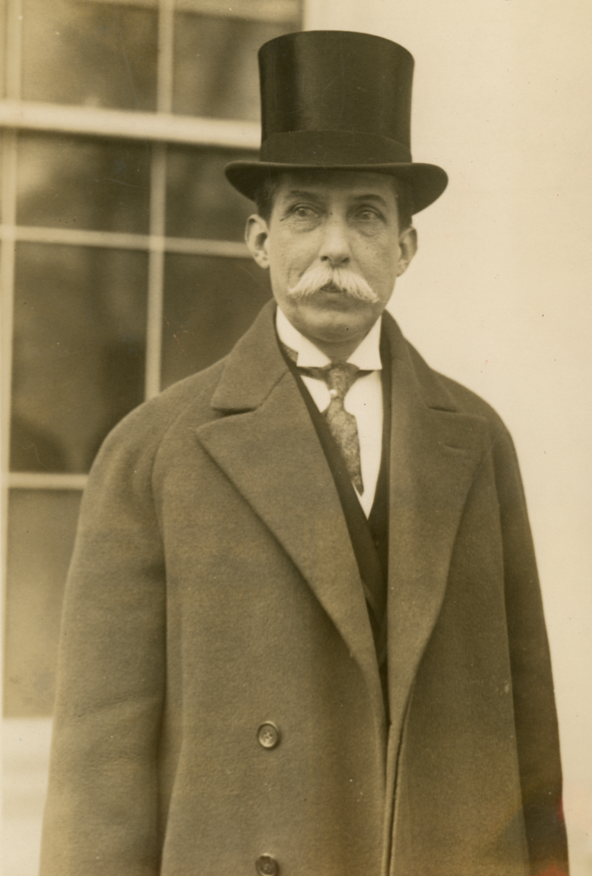
- Guerrero at the White House in 1927

1st President of the International Court of Justice
- In office 6 February 1946 – 1949
- Vice President: Jules Basdevant
- Preceded by: Office established
- Succeeded by: Jules Basdevant

2nd Vice President of the International Court of Justice
- In office 1949 – 5 February 1955
- President: Jules Basdevant (until 1952); Arnold McNair (from 1952)
- Preceded by: Jules Basdevant
- Succeeded by: Abdel Hamid Badawi

Judge of the International Court of Justice
- In office 6 February 1946 – 25 October 1958

President of the Permanent Court of International Justice
- In office 1936–1946
- Vice President: Cecil Hurst
- Preceded by: Cecil Hurst
- Succeeded by: Office abolished

Vice President of the Permanent Court of International Justice
- In office 1931–1936
- President: Mineichirō Adachi (until 1933); Cecil Hurst (from 1934)
- Preceded by: Max Huber
- Succeeded by: Cecil Hurst

Judge of the Permanent Court of International Justice
- In office 16 January 1931 – October 1945

12th President of the Assembly of the League of Nations
- In office September 1929 – 1930
- Preceded by: Herluf Zahle
- Succeeded by: Nicolae Titulescu

Minister of Foreign Affairs of El Salvador
- In office 27 April 1927 – 17 April 1928
- President: Pío Romero Bosque
- Preceded by: Reyes Arrieta Rossi
- Succeeded by: Francisco Martínez Suárez

Personal details
- Born: 26 June 1876 San Salvador, El Salvador
- Died: 25 October 1958 (aged 82) Nice, France
- Education: University of El Salvador; San Carlos University
- Occupation: Diplomat, jurist

José Gustavo Guerrero (26 June 1876 – 25 October 1958) was a Salvadoran diplomat and jurist who served as the last president of the Permanent Court of International Justice from 1937 to 1946 and the first president of the International Court of Justice from 1946 to 1949. He also served as President of the Assembly of the League of Nations from 1929 to 1930.

== Early life ==
José Gustavo Guerrero was born on 26 June 1876 in San Salvador, El Salvador. During the 1890s, Guerrero attended the University of El Salvador. He and other students were expelled from the university after issuing an open letter to Salvadoran president Rafael Antonio Gutiérrez criticizing his government. Guerrero then moved to Guatemala to attend the San Carlos University of Guatemala where he graduated as a Doctor of Law in 1898. After Guerrero's graduation, he returned to El Salvador where President Tomás Regalado appointed him as his personal secretary.

== Diplomatic career ==
In 1902, Guerrero was appointed as secretary of the Salvadoran embassy to the United States and later as consul of El Salvador to Bordeaux, France. In 1911, he was appointed as El Salvador's extraordinary and plenipotentiary envoy to Rome, Italy. In June 1911, Guerrero attended the coronation of British king George V. In 1912, Guerrero became El Salvador's envoy to Madrid, Spain, and in 1913, he became envoy to Paris, France.

In 1927, Salvadoran president Pío Romero Bosque offered to appoint Guerrero as Minister of Foreign Affairs but Guerrero declined. Guerrero later accepted the appointment due to pressure from his associates to accept the position. Guerrero became Minister of Foreign Affairs on 27 April 1927. As minister, he established the Diplomatic School of El Salvador. On 23 May 1927, Guerrero issued a decree that privatized the University of El Salvador. In 1928, Guerrero led the Salvadoran delegation at the VI Interamerican Conference in Havana, Cuba. He served as Minister of Foreign Affairs until his resignation in 1928 and he returned to Paris to resume his role as extraordinary and plenipotentiary envoy.

In September 1929, Guerrero was elected almost unanimously as the president of the 10th session of the Assembly of the League of Nations. He served until 1930.

== Jurist career ==
=== Permanent Court of International Justice ===
In 1930, Guerrero was elected to a nine-year term as a justice of the Permanent Court of International Justice in The Hague, Netherlands. He assumed office in 1931, and that year, he became the court's vice president. In 1936, Guerrero became the court's president. Upon the end of his nine-year term, Guerrero was re-elected to a second term.

During the German invasion of the Netherlands in 1940, Guerrero and a group of Dutch officials personally blocked German soldiers from entering the Palace of the Permanent Court of International Justice. Guerrero was the only one of the court's justices to remain in The Hague during the invasion of the Netherlands. Eventually, however, Guerrero left the Netherlands. During World War II, Guerrero helped Colonel José Castellanos Contreras, El Salvador's consul to Switzerland, issue fake Salvadoran passports to Jews fleeing Nazi-occupied Europe.

=== International Court of Justice ===
On 6 February 1946, Guerrero was elected as the first president of the newly-established International Court of Justice (ICJ). He served until 1949 when he became the court's vice president; he served as vice president until 5 February 1955. That day, he was elected to a second term as an ICJ justice through 1964.

== Personal life ==
Guerrero had several children including Gustavo Adolfo who became a Salvadoran diplomat and ambassador.

Guerrero was a proponent of Central American reunification and the reestablishment of the Federal Republic of Central America.

== Death ==
Guerrero died on 25 October 1958 in Nice, France. He was buried in a cemetery in Nice.

== Legacy ==
Guerrero's is celebrated in El Salvador annually on 26 June (Guerrero's birthday) as the Day of the Diplomatic Salvadoran. The Dr. José Gustavo Guerrero Diplomatic Institute in Antiguo Cuscatlán, El Salvador is named after him. The Doctor José Gustavo Guerrero Medal of Diplomatic Merit of El Salvador is also named after him.

== Awards and decorations ==
El Salvador

- Grand Cross with Golden Plaque of the National Order of José Matías Delgado
- 5 November 1811 Order of Merit (23 January 2019, posthumous)

Political offices
Preceded by Reyes Arrieta Rossi	Minister of Foreign Affairs of El Salvador; 1927–1928	Succeeded by Francisco Martínez Suárez
Preceded by Herluf Zahle	President of the Assembly of the League of Nations; 1929–1930	Succeeded by Nicolae Titulescu
Court offices
Preceded by Max Huber	Vice President of the Permanent Court of International Justice; 1931–1935	Succeeded by Cecil Hurst
Preceded by Cecil Hurst	President of the Permanent Court of International Justice; 1936–1944	Office abolished
New office	President of the International Court of Justice; 1946–1949	Succeeded by Jules Basdevant
Preceded by Jules Basdevant	Vice President of the International Court of Justice; 1949–1955	Succeeded by Abdel Hamid Badawi
