= José Caeiro da Mata =

Portuguese jurist and minister

José Caeiro da Mata GCC GCSE GCIH GCIP
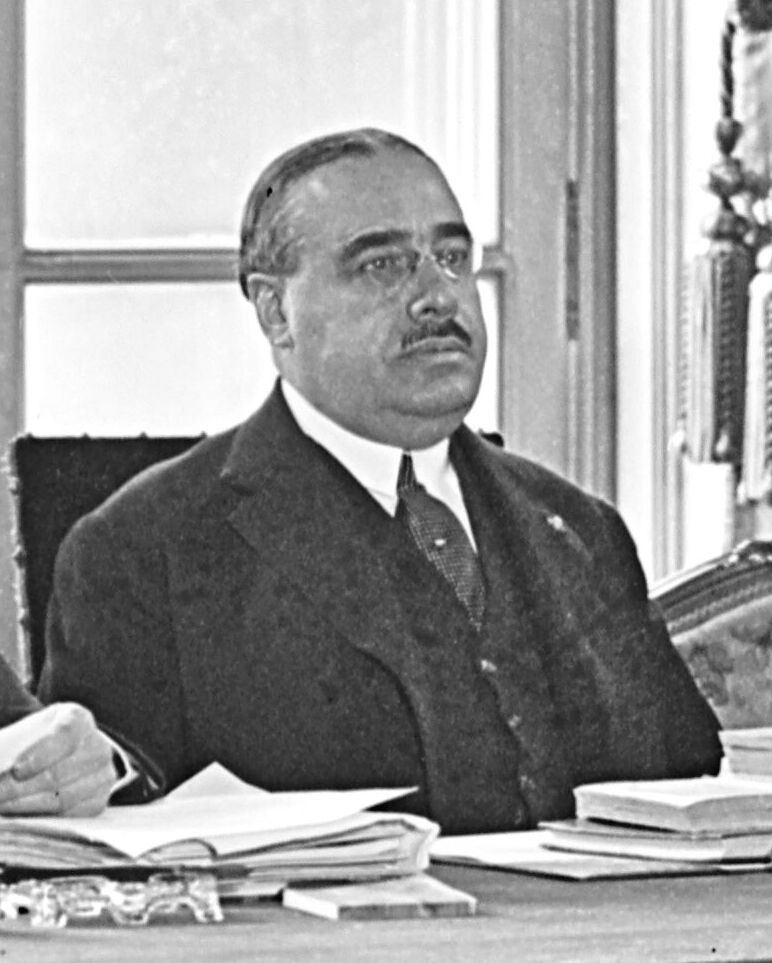
- José Caeiro da Mata in 1933

Minister of Foreign Affairs
- In office 4 February 1947 – 2 August 1950
- Prime Minister: António de Oliveira Salazar
- Preceded by: António de Oliveira Salazar
- Succeeded by: Paulo Cunha
- In office 11 April 1933 – 27 March 1935
- Prime Minister: António de Oliveira Salazar
- Preceded by: César de Sousa Mendes
- Succeeded by: Armindo Monteiro

Minister of Public Instruction
- In office 6 September 1944 – 4 February 1947
- Prime Minister: António de Oliveira Salazar
- Preceded by: Mário de Figueiredo
- Succeeded by: Fernando Pires de Lima

Rector of the University of Lisbon
- In office 25 September 1929 – 31 May 1946
- Preceded by: Francisco Xavier da Silva Teles
- Succeeded by: José Gabriel Pinto Coelho

Personal details
- Born: 6 January 1883 Vimieiro, Arraiolos, Portugal
- Died: 3 January 1963 (aged 79) Lisbon, Portugal
- Citizenship: Portugal

Dr. José Caeiro da Mata (Note: Or 'Matta'.) GCC GCSE GCIH GCIP (6 January 1883 – 3 January 1963) was a Portuguese jurist, professor of law and politician.

Mata began his career in 1907 as a Professor at the University of Coimbra, before transferring to the University of Lisbon in 1919. He held several public and administrative positions in Lisbon and was rector of the University from 1929 to 1946. He also served as the second president of the Academy of Portuguese History, from 1945 to his death in 1963.

He was a deputy judge in the Permanent Court of International Justice from 1931 to 1936. Under the Estado Novo, he served twice as the Minister of Foreign Affairs (1933 – 1935, 1947 – 1950) and the Minister of National Education (1944 – 1947).

Representing Portugal as Foreign Minister, Mata signed the North Atlantic Treaty on 4 April 1949 at Washington, D.C.
