= Anzilotti =

Anzilotti is an Italian surname. Notable people with the surname include:

- Dionisio Anzilotti (1867–1950), Italian jurist and judge
- Luca Anzilotti (fl. 1989), German producer
- Perry Anzilotti (born 1959), American actor
