= Gheorghe Tașcă =

Romanian economist and politician

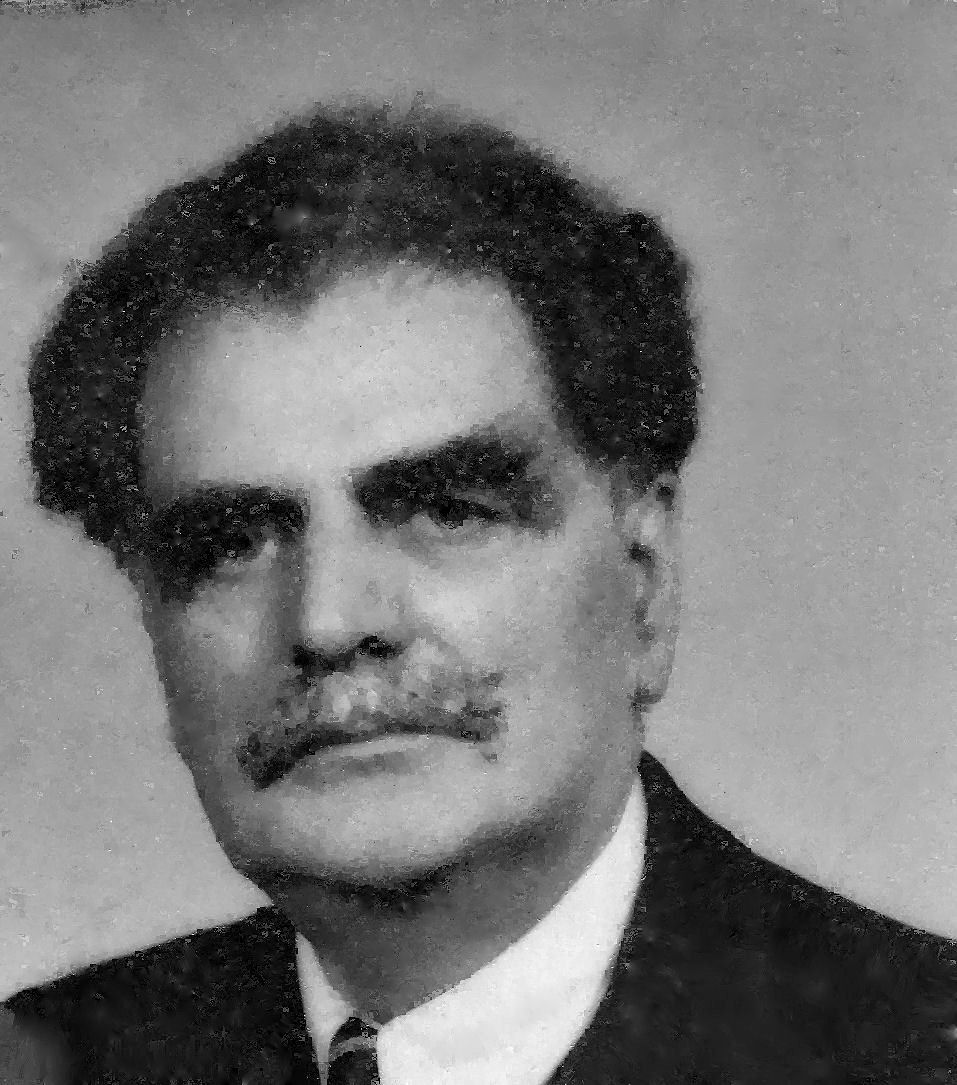
- Gheorghe Tașcă in 1942
- Born: Iorgu Tașcă; January 30, 1875; Bălăbănești, Tutova County, Kingdom of Romania
- Died: March 25, 1951 (aged 76); Sighet Prison, Romanian People's Republic
- Occupations: Economist, politician, diplomat
- Spouse: Cordelia Demetriescu (1874–1971)
- Children: Elisabeta Tașcă (1906–1992); Georgeta Tașcă (1908–1996)
- Parent(s): Gheorghe I. Tașcă (1847–1935); Maria Tașcă (née Dabija) (1849–1945)

Academic background
- Education: University of Bucharest; University of Paris
- Theses: La question agraire (1907); Les nouvelles réformes agraires en Roumanie (1910)
- Doctoral advisor: André Weiss

Minister of Industry and Commerce
- In office January 12, 1932 – June 5, 1932
- Prime Minister: Nicolae Iorga
- Preceded by: Nicolae Vasilescu-Karpen
- Succeeded by: Ion Lugoșianu

Gheorghe Tașcă (born Iorgu Tașcă, January 30, 1875 – March 25, 1951) was a Romanian economist, lawyer, academic, diplomat, and politician. He was a corresponding member of the Romanian Academy.

After a distinguished career as jurist and professor at the Bucharest Academy of Economic Studies, ambassador to Germany, and Minister of Industry and Commerce, he became a victim of the Communist regime, dying at Sighet Prison.

== Biography ==
=== Early days ===
Tașcă was born in Bălăbănești, Tutova County, now in Galați County. He was one of 12 children of Gheorghe I. Tașcă, a local landowner and philanthropist, and Maria, née Dabija, the daughter of the local priest. He studied from 1886 to 1995 at the Gheorghe Roșca Codreanu High School in Bârlad, after which he went to Bucharest to study at the Faculty of Law of the University of Bucharest, graduating in 1899 magna cum laude, with thesis "On the evolution of rural property in Romania". After being admitted to the bar of Ilfov County, he became a member of the Conservative Party and was elected representative of Tutova County to the Chamber of Deputies. On December 8, 1905, he married Cordelia Demetriescu, the daughter of historian and writer Anghel Demetriescu. A year later their first daughter, Elisabeta, was born (she married in 1929 Eugen Filotti), while their second daughter, Georgeta, was born in 1908.

=== Academic career ===
In 1905 Tașcă went to Paris to pursue his studies at the Law School of the University of Paris; on May 28, 1907, he successfully defended his thesis, "La question agraire. Commentaire critique de la legislation rurale en Roumanie, Angleterre, Irlande, Allemagne", written under the direction of André Weiss. Upon returning to Bucharest, he applied for a position in the Political Economy department of the Faculty of Law; although Tașcă won the competition, his appointment was vetoed by Spiru Haret, the Minister of Education, on the theory that a law degree does not provide the necessary qualifications to teach Economics. In 1908 Tașcă returned to Paris, where he received in 1910 a second doctoral degree, this time in Economics, with thesis "Les nouvelles réformes agraires en Roumanie".

Back in Romania, Tașcă applied again in 1912 and was offered an assistant professor position in political economy at the University of Bucharest. When the Central Powers occupied Bucharest in World War I, he took refuge in late 1916 in Moldavia; conscripted into the Romanian Army, he served as diplomatic courier between Iași and Saint Petersburg. Returning to his teaching at the end of the war, he was promoted to associate professor in 1921, and in 1925 to full professor, a position which he held until 1940.

In 1925 he was elected corresponding member of the Romanian Academy. He was professor of political economy and rector (1929–1931) of the Academy of High Commercial and Industrial Studies of Bucharest (now the Bucharest Academy of Economic Studies).

=== Political career ===
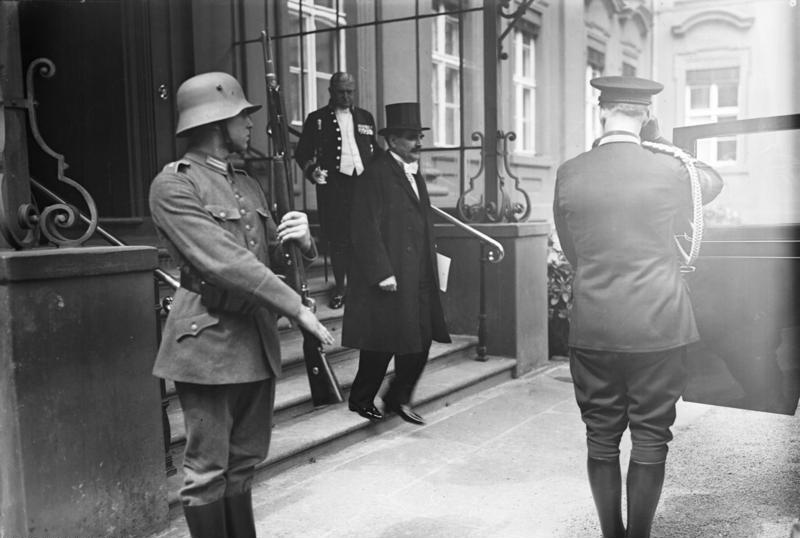
Tașcă leaving the Palace of the Reich President in Berlin after he was received by President Paul von Hindenburg to present his credentials on May 1, 1930

In 1910 Tașcă followed Take Ionescu and joined the Conservative-Democratic Party, contributing to the development of its political platform. When the party was dissolved in 1922, he joined Nicolae Iorga's Democratic Nationalist Party, and was elected to the Chamber of Deputies in the 1926 elections. From 1927 to 1929 he was Editor in Chief of Iorga's magazine, Neamul Românesc.

From May 1, 1930, to May 1, 1932, Tașcă was Romania's ambassador to Germany. From January 12 to June 5, 1932, he served as Minister of Industry and Commerce in the Iorga cabinet. He then became an admirer of Nazism and, in May 1933, contributed to the reestablishment of the National Socialist Party.

=== Last years ===
Tașcă was arrested on August 1, 1950, by the Communist authorities and incarcerated in the notorious Sighet Prison, Maramureș County in cell number 58. He died on March 25, 1951, after a harsh detention regime and was buried at the Paupers Cemetery in Sighetu Marmației, in a common grave.

== Works ==
- Tasca, Georges (1907). La question agraire. Commentaire critique de la législation rurale en Roumanie, Angleterre, Irlande, Russie et Allemagne (étude de droit comparé) (in French). V. Giard & E. Brière. ISBN 978-1274386144. OCLC 1024749424.
- Tasca, Georges (1910). Les nouvelles réformes agraires en Roumanie (in French). Giard & Brière. OCLC 258722481.
- Tașcă, Gheorghe (1930). Rolul micii industrii în viața economică a statului nostru (in Romanian). București: Tipografia România Mare. OCLC 895389984.
- Tașcă, Gheorghe; Strat, George; Ioanițescu, Dimitrie R. (1930). Un deceniu de politică socială românească (in Romanian). București: Tipografiile Române Unite. OCLC 54274164.
- Tașcă, Gheorghe (1940), Politica socială a României (legislația muncitorească) (in Romanian), București: Tiparul Românesc, OCLC 54274164

== Decorations and awards ==
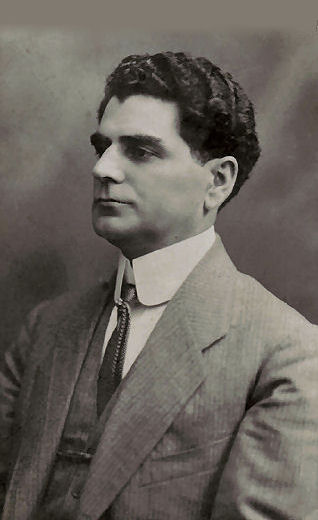
Gheorghe Tașcă in 1913

- Commander of the Order of the Crown (Romania)
- Grand Cross of the Order of the Lithuanian Grand Duke Gediminas
