= Willem van Eysinga =

Dutch legal historian and professor (1878–1961)

Jonkheer Willem van Eysinga
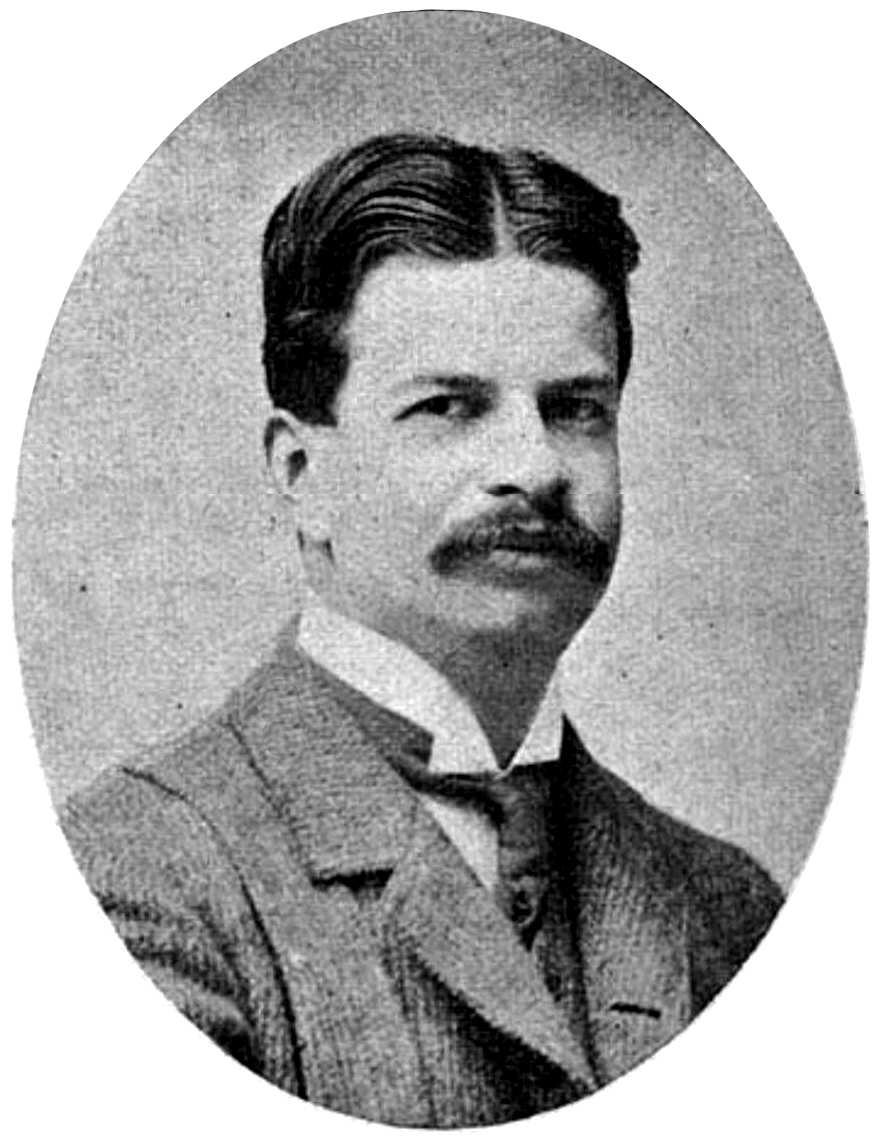

Judge of the Permanent Court of International Justice
- In office 15 January 1931 – October 1945
- Preceded by: Bernard Loder

Personal details
- Born: 31 January 1878 Noordwijkerhout, The Netherlands
- Died: 24 January 1961 (aged 82) Leiden, The Netherlands

Academic background
- Education: Leiden University
- Thesis: Proeve eener inleiding tot het Nederlandsen tractatenrecht (1906)
- Doctoral advisor: Jacques Oppenheim
- Other advisor: Cornelis van Vollenhoven

Academic work
- Discipline: Public international law
- Institutions: University of Groningen; Leiden University
- Doctoral students: Eelco van Kleffens; Ben Telders

Willem Jan Mari van Eysinga (31 January 1878 – 24 January 1961) was a Dutch diplomat and jurist. He served as a judge on the Permanent Court of International Justice from 1931 to 1945.

== Early life and education ==
Van Eysinga was born on 3 January 1878 in Noordwijkerhout, now the municipality of Noordwijk, to a prominent political family. His father, Tjalling, was the mayor of Noordwijkerhout and his grandfather, Frans van Eysinga, was President of the Dutch Senate from 1880 to 1888. Van Eysinga received a Doctor of Law and a Doctor of Political Science from the Leiden University in 1900 and 1906 respectively. He married Coralie Leopoldina, baroness van Hogendorp, in 1908.

== Academia and diplomacy ==
Van Eysinga worked in the Dutch Ministry of Foreign Affairs from 1902 to 1908, eventually rising to Director of the Legal and Political Section. He served as an assistant delegate to the 1907 Hague Convention, and in 1910 was appointed the Dutch representative on the Central Commission for Navigation on the Rhine, a position he held until 1930. Van Eysinga was a professor of public law at the University of Groningen from 1908 to 1912, at which point he became a professor of public international law at Leiden University. He became a member of the Royal Netherlands Academy of Arts and Sciences in 1926. Van Eysinga was rector magnificus of Leiden University between 1928 and 1929. He laid down his position as professor at Leiden in 1931.

After World War I, Van Eysinga served as a member of the Dutch delegation to the 1919 Paris Peace Conference, where he took part in the negotiations leading to the Covenant of the League of Nations and portions of the Treaty of Versailles relating to the Rhine. From 1920 to 1931 he was a member of the Dutch representation in the Assembly of the League of Nations. During that time van Eysinga also participated in the development of the transit organization of the League of Nations.

== Judicial career ==
In 1921, van Eysinga served on an arbitral panel led by Max Huber, tasked with settling a dispute between Germany and certain Dutch banks. He was the President of the Committee of Jurists asked by the Council of the League of Nations in 1925 to provide an opinion on a dispute between Danzig and Poland. Van Eysinga was the Dutch government's representative at the 1930 League of Nations Codification Conference, which purported to codify certain aspects of international law. During this period he was also a member of the Permanent Court of Arbitration.

In 1930, van Eysinga was elected by the Assembly and Council of the League of Nations to serve on the Permanent Court of International Justice. He started his term in 1931, serving until the dissolution of the Court in 1945.

He died in Leiden on 24 January 1961.

== Bibliography ==
- Leer en leven der statenvervormingen. Groningen: J.B. Wolters. 1908.
- De studie van het internationale recht: Rede bij de aanvaarding van het ambt van gewoon hoogleeraar in het volkenrecht aan de Rijks-universiteit te Leiden uitgesproken, den 23sten October 1912. Leiden: E.J. Brill. 1912.
- Evolution du droit fluvial international du Congrès de Vienne au Traité de Versailles, 1815-1919 [Evolution of International Riparian Rights from the Congress of Vienna to the Treaty of Versailles, 1815-1919] (in French). Leiden: A.W. Sijthoff. 1919.
- "La guerre chimique et le mouvement pour sa répression" [Chemical Warfare and the Movement for its Repression]. Recueil des cours (in French). 16: 325–84. 1927.
- La Commission centrale pour la navigation du Rhin [The Central Commission for the Navigation of the Rhine] (in French). Leiden: A.W. Sijthoff. 1935.
- Asbeck, F.M. Baron van; Kleffens, E.N. van; Mandele, K.P. van der; Stellinga, J.R., eds. (1958). Sparsa collecta: Een aantaal der verspreide geschriften van Jonkheer W.J.M. van Eysinga. Leiden: A.W. Sijthoff.
