= Ludwik Ehrlich =

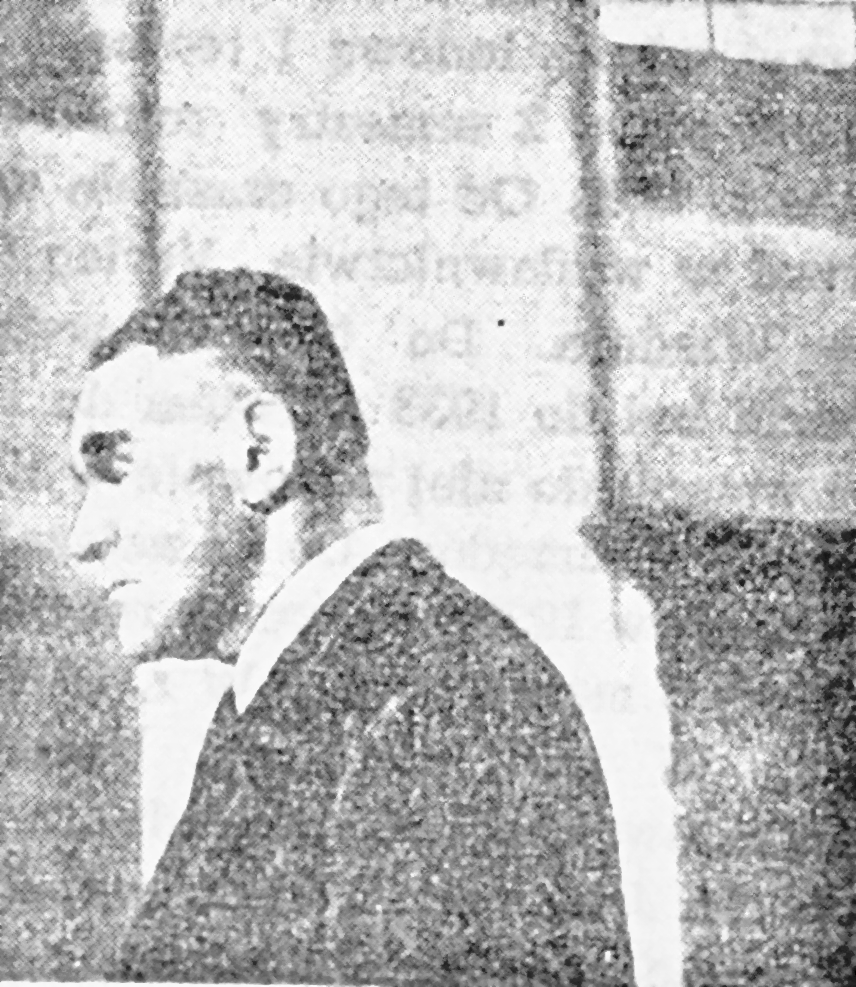
Ludwik Ehrlich in 1946

Ludwik Ehrlich (April 11, 1889 in Ternopil – October 31, 1968 in Kraków ) was a Polish lawyer, professor of Lviv University and the Jagiellonian, ad hoc judge of the Permanent Court of International Justice.
