= Statute of the Permanent Court of International Justice =

1920 international treaty

The Statute of the Permanent Court of International Justice was an international treaty concluded in Geneva on 13 December 1920 by representatives of 46 states, most of which came from the Allied Powers of the First World War. It was registered in League of Nations Treaty Series on October 8, 1921. It brought the Permanent Court of International Justice into existence.

== Clauses ==
The statute consisted of 64 articles.

Article 1 stated that the Court is established in conformity with article 14 of the Covenant of the League of Nations, and its function shall not contradict the operation of the Permanent Court of Arbitration or any other special arbitration tribunals.

Article 2 stipulated that the Court shall consist of independent judges, elected regardless of nationality.

Article 3 fixed the number of judges at 11, plus 4 deputy-judges.

Article 4 provided for election of judges by the League Assembly and Council from lists of candidates delivered by the candidates' national governments.

== Ratifications ==
Country	Signed	Ratified	Ratification deposited
Albania	1920-12-16	1921-6-29	1921-7-13
Austria	1920-12-16	1921-7-15	1921-7-23
Belgium	1920-12-16	1921-8-17	1921-8-29
Brazil	1920-12-16	1921-9-6	1921-11-1
Bulgaria	1920-12-16	1921-7-29	1921-8-12
Chile	1920-12-16	NA	1928-7-20
China	1920-12-16	1921-9-29	1922-5-13
Cuba	1920-12-16	1921-9-12	1922-1-12
Denmark	1920-12-16	1921-5-19	1921-6-13
Estonia	1920-12-16	1923-4-25	1923-5-2
Latvia	1923-9-11		
United Kingdom	1920-12-16	1921-7-16	1921-8-4
Spain	1920-12-16	1921-8-2	1921-8-30
Finland	1920-12-16	1922-1-28	1922-4-6
France	1920-12-16	1921-7-29	1921-8-7
Greece	1920-12-16	1921-9-3	1921-10-3
Haiti	1920-12-16	1921-8-6	1921-9-7
Italy	1920-12-16	1921-6-12	1921-6-20
Empire of Japan	1920-12-16	1921-4-9	1921-11-16
Lithuania	1920-12-16	1922-2-14	1922-5-16
Norway	1920-12-16	1921-7-28	1921-8-20
Netherlands	1920-12-16	1921-7-20	1921-8-6
Poland	1920-12-16	1921-8-22	1921-8-26
Portugal	1920-12-16	1921-9-12	1921-10-8
Romania	1920-12-16	1921-7-18	1921-8-8
Kingdom of Yugoslavia	1920-12-16	1921-7-25	1921-8-12
Thailand	1920-12-16	1921-8-15	1922-2-27
Sweden	1920-12-16	1920-12-31	1921-2-21
Switzerland	1920-12-16	1921-4-16	1921-7-25
Czechoslovakia	1920-12-16	1921-8-29	1921-9-2
Uruguay	1920-12-16	1921-8-24	1921-9-27
Venezuela	1920-12-16	1921-9-7	1921-12-2
Hungary	1923-8-1	1925-11-5	1925-11-20
Dominican Republic	1924-9-30		
Ethiopia	1926-7-12	1926-7-15	1926-7-16
Ireland	NA	NA	1926-8-21
Germany	1926-12-10	1927-2-28	1927-3-11
Guatemala	1926-12-17		
Panama	1920-12-16	NA	1929-6-14
Nicaragua	1929-6-14		
Peru	1929-6-14	NA	1932-3-29
United States of America	1929-12-9		
El Salvador	1920-12-16	NA	1930-8-29
Luxembourg	1920-12-16	NA	1930-9-15
Iran	1920-12-16	NA	1931-4-25
Colombia	1920-12-16	NA	1932-1-6
Paraguay	1920-12-16	NA	1933-5-11
Bolivia	1920-12-16	NA	1936-7-7
Argentina	1935-12-28		
Turkey	1936-3-12		
Monaco	did not sign	1937-4-22	1937-5-12
Iraq	1938-9-22		
Egypt	1939-5-20		
