= André Weiss =

French jurist and academic (1858–1928)

Charles André Weiss
- Born: September 30, 1858; Mulhouse, France
- Died: August 31, 1928; The Hague, Netherlands

Academic background
- Education: University of Paris

Academic work
- Institutions: University of Dijon; University of Paris
- Doctoral students: Gheorghe Tașcă

Charles André Weiss (September 30, 1858 in Mulhouse – August 31, 1928 in the Hague) was a French jurist. He was professor at the Universities of Dijon and Paris and served from 1922 until his death as judge of the Permanent Court of International Justice.

== Life ==
André Weiss was born in Mulhouse in 1858 and completed a degree in law at the University of Paris in 1880. The following year he became a professor at the University of Dijon. In 1891 he moved to the University of Paris Faculty of Law. There he was from 1896 to 1908 a full professor of civil law, and from 1908 he held the chair for international law and private international law. From 1907 he also acted as legal advisor to the French Ministry of Foreign Affairs. He was a close associate of Secretary of State Aristide Briand and participated as a delegate to the Paris Peace Conference at the end of World War I. He led one of the subcommissions of the conference.

From 1920, he was a member of the Permanent Court of Arbitration in The Hague. In September 1921, he was elected by the Assembly and the Council of the League of Nations to the post of judge on the newly formed Permanent International Court. His fellow judges elected him vice president at the beginning of the Tribunal's work on February 3, 1922. He was confirmed in this office in 1924 and 1927. He died before the end of his term as Judge and Vice President in August 1928 in the Hague. His compatriot, Henri Fromageot, was elected his successor, and in the office of vice-president he was succeeded by the Swiss Max Huber.

André Weiss taught in 1923 as a lecturer at the Hague Academy of International Law. He was a member of the Institut de Droit International from 1887, acting as president of its 30th session in 1922 in Grenoble. From 1914 he was a member of the Académie des sciences morales et politiques.

== Prominent Works ==
- Traité théorique et pratique de droit international privé, 6 vols. Paris 1892–1913.
- Manuel de droit international prive. Paris 1905
