= Michał Jan Rostworowski =

Polish-Austrian lawyer (1864–1940)

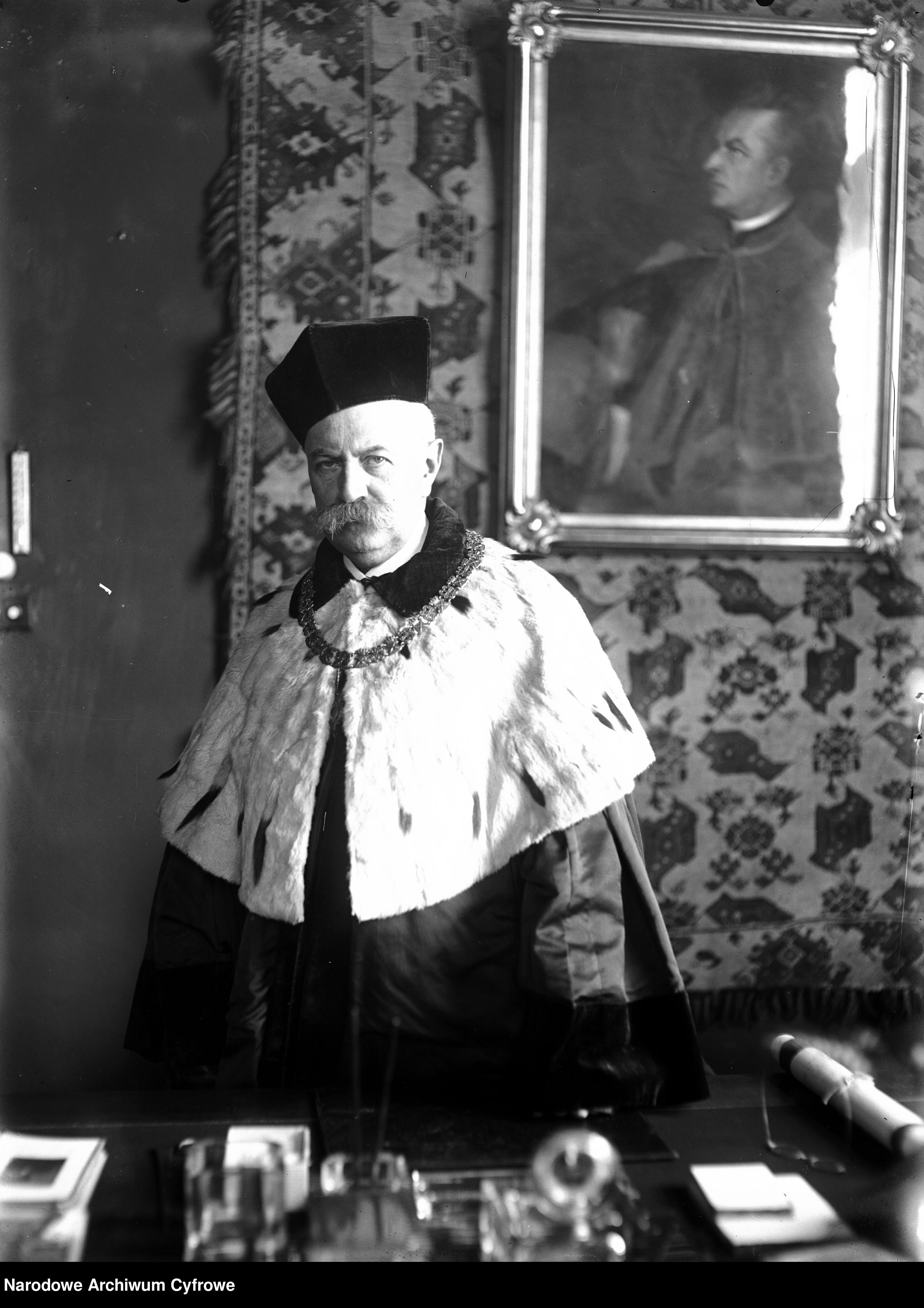
- Born: August 27, 1864; Dresden, Kingdom of Saxony
- Died: March 24, 1940 (aged 75); Tarnów, German-occupied Poland
- Occupations: Professor and jurist
- Title: Judge of the Permanent Court of International Justice (1930–1940)

Michał Jan Rostworowski (August 27, 1864, Dresden – March 24, 1940, Tarnów) was a Polish-Austrian lawyer. He was professor of international and constitutional law at the University of Cracow from 1903 to 1930, serving as rector in the 1925–1926 academic year. He was elected as a judge of the Permanent Court of International Justice, which position he held until his death in 1940.

== Early life and education ==
Michał Rostworowski came from a Russian-Polish noble family and was born in 1864 in Dresden, Kingdom of Saxony, his family having relocated there after the January Uprising in 1863. He studied at the University of Warsaw and then obtained his degree law at the University of St. Petersburg, where he also studied history. He later devoted himself from 1889 to 1891 at the Ecole Libre des Sciences Politiques in Paris, from 1891 to 1893 at the University of Cracow, where he received his doctorate, and from 1893 to 1995 at the Universities of Bern and Vienna.

== Academic career ==
In 1896, he became a lecturer of international law and private international law and constitutional law at the Cracow University. He became an Austrian citizen that same year. In 1903, he was appointed an associate professor and became a full professor of international law and Austrian constitutional law five years after. In the Law Faculty, he founded and became the director of the School of Political Sciences in 1910. He has also served dean of the faculty in the 1912–1913 academic and as rector in the 1925–1926 academic year. He remained with the university until 1930. From 1920 he wrote as a member of the Kodifizierungskommission after the First World War, newly formed Polish Republic, a number of bills.

== International appointments ==
Michał Rostworowski became a member of the Permanent Court of Arbitration in 1923, and was a member of several international arbitration commissions. He served as a delegate of Poland to the fifth and sixth sessions of the Hague Conference on Private International Law in 1925 and 1928, respectively. He served multiple times on the Polish delegation to the meetings of the Assembly of the League of Nations. In 1898, he became a member of the Institut de Droit International.

In September 1930, he became a judge on the Permanent Court of International Justice, having served there on an ad hoc basis four times before. Due to the beginning of the Second World War, new elections could not be held, new elections could not be held in 1939, and Michał Rostworowski retained his position as judge until his death in 1940. His position was not filled due to the dissolution of the court, which was replaced by the International Court of Justice as part of the creation of the United Nations.

== Works ==
- Austryacka Izba panów. Łódź 1900
- Rada ministrów i Rada stanu Ksie̜stwa Warszawskiego. Krakau 1911
- Wojna i traktat pokojowy. Krakau 1916
- Dziennik czynnosci Komisyi Rządzącej. Krakau 1918
- Liga narodów. Krakau 1920
