= Permanent Court of International Justice =

International court from 1922 to 1946

- Cour permanente de justice internationale
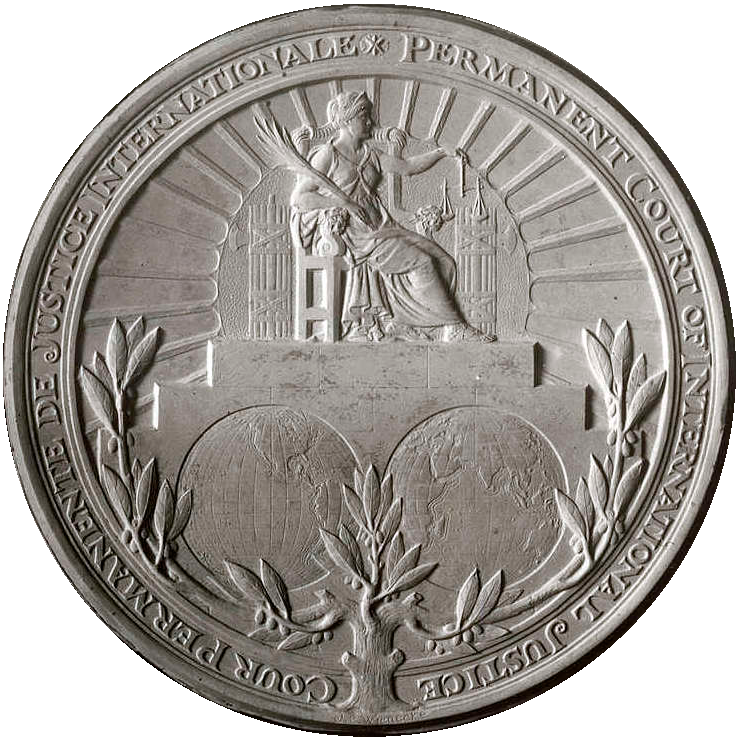
- The seal of the Permanent Court of International Justice. The successor International Court of Justice adopted the seal as well.
- Interactive map of Permanent Court of International Justice
- 52°05′11.76″N 4°17′43.80″E
- Established: 1920
- Dissolved: 1946
- Location: The Hague
- Coordinates: 52°05′11.76″N 4°17′43.80″E

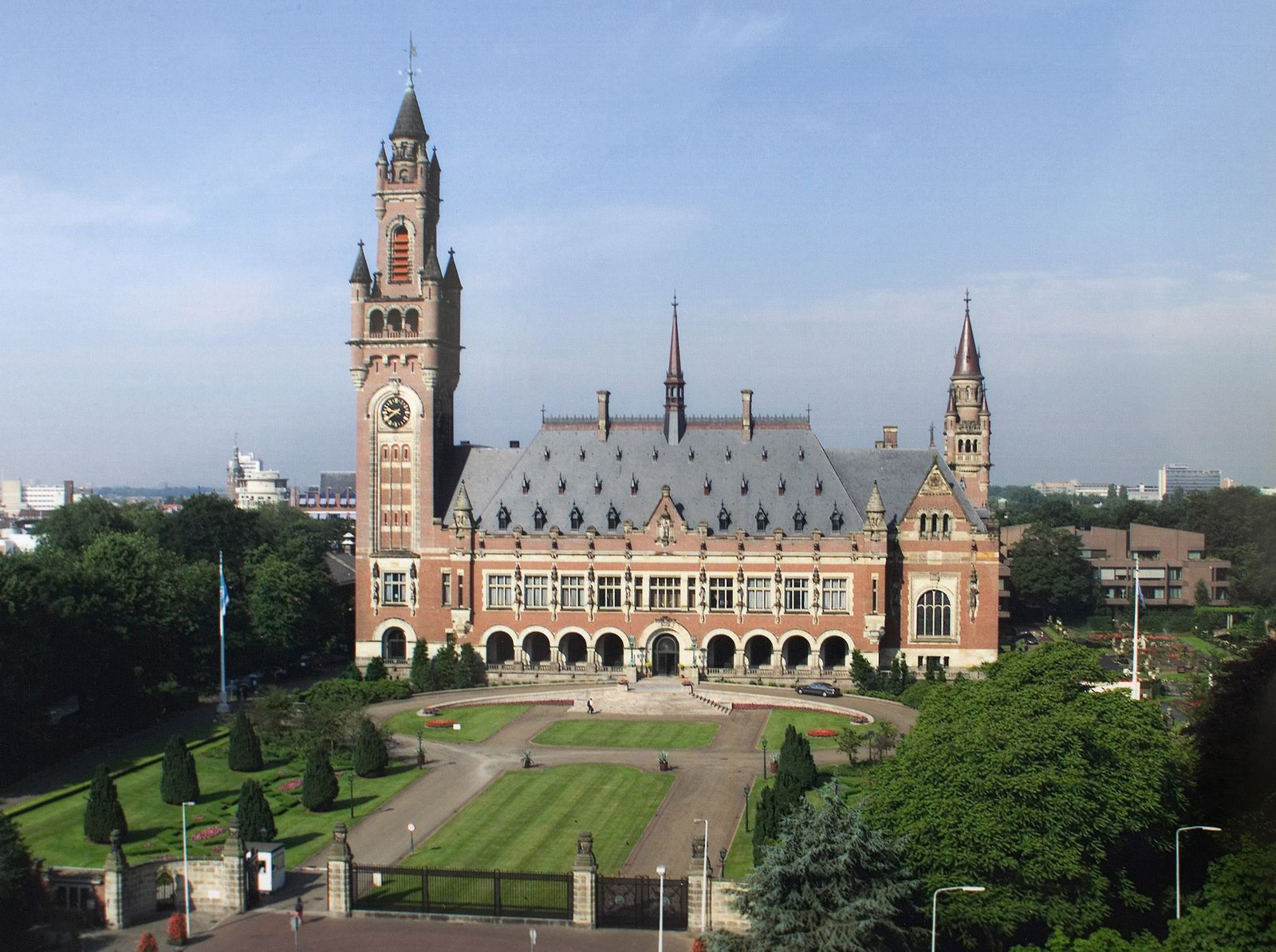
The Peace Palace in The Hague, Netherlands, home to the Permanent Court of International Justice

The Permanent Court of International Justice, often called the World Court, existed from 1922 to 1946. It was an international court attached to the League of Nations. Created in 1920 (although the idea of an international court was several centuries old), the court was initially well-received from states and academics alike, with many cases submitted to it for its first decade of operation.

Between 1922 and 1940 the court heard a total of 29 cases and delivered 27 separate advisory opinions. With the heightened international tension in the 1930s, the court became less used. By a resolution from the League of Nations on 18 April 1946, both the court and the league ceased to exist and were replaced by the International Court of Justice and the United Nations.

The court's mandatory jurisdiction came from three sources: the Optional Clause of the League of Nations, general international conventions and special bipartite international treaties. Cases could also be submitted directly by states, but they were not bound to submit material unless it fell into those three categories. The court could issue either judgments or advisory opinions. Judgments were directly binding but not advisory opinions. In practice, member states of the League of Nations followed advisory opinions anyway for fear of possibly undermining the moral and legal authority of the court and the league.

== History ==
=== Founding and early years ===
An international court had long been proposed; Pierre Dubois suggested it in 1305 and Émeric Crucé in 1623. An idea of an international court of justice arose in the political world at the First Hague Peace Conference in 1899, where it was declared that arbitration between states was the easiest solution to disputes, providing a temporary panel of judges to arbitrate in such cases, the Permanent Court of Arbitration. At the Second Hague Peace Conference in 1907, a draft convention for a permanent Court of Arbitral Justice was written although disputes and other pressing business at the Conference meant that such a body was never established, owing to difficulties agreeing on a procedure to select the judges. The outbreak of the First World War, and, in particular, its conclusion made it clear to many academics that some kind of world court was needed, and it was widely expected that one would be established. Article 14 of the Covenant of the League of Nations, created after the Treaty of Versailles, allowed the league to investigate setting up an international court. In June 1920, an Advisory Committee of jurists appointed by the League of Nations finally established a working guideline for the appointment of judges, and the committee was then authorised to draft a constitution for a permanent court not of arbitration but of justice. The Statute of the Permanent Court of International Justice was accepted in Geneva on 13 December 1920.

The court first sat on 30 January 1922, at the Peace Palace, The Hague, covering preliminary business during the first session (such as establishing procedure and appointing officers) Nine judges sat, along with three deputies, since Antonio Sánchez de Bustamante y Sirven, Ruy Barbosa and Wang Ch'ung-hui were unable to attend, the last being at the Washington Naval Conference. The court elected Bernard Loder as president and Max Huber as vice-president; Huber was replaced by André Weiss a month later. On 14 February the court was officially opened, and rules of procedure were established on 24 March, when the court ended its first session. The court first sat to decide cases on 15 June. During its first year of business, the court issued three advisory opinions, all related to the International Labour Organization created by the Treaty of Versailles.

The initial reaction to the court was good, from politicians, practising lawyers and academics alike. Ernest Pollock, the former Attorney General for England and Wales said, "May we not as lawyers regard the establishment of an International Court of Justice as an advance in the science that we pursue?" John Henry Wigmore said that the creation of the court "should have given every lawyer a thrill of cosmic vibration", and James Brown Scott wrote that "the one dream of our ages has been realised in our time". Much praise was heaped upon the appointment of an American judge despite the fact that the United States had not become a signatory to the court's protocol, and it was thought that it would soon do so.

=== Increasing work ===
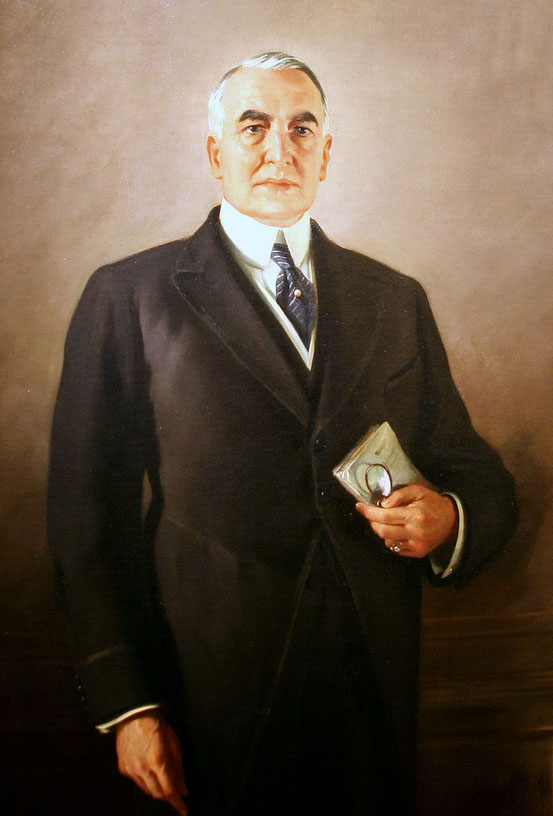
U.S. President Warren G. Harding, who had first suggested American involvement; the U.S. demanded a veto, however, and never joined.

The court faced increasing work as it went on, allaying the fears of those commentators who had believed the court would become like the Supreme Court of the United States, which was not presented with a case for its first six terms. The court was given nine cases during 1922, however, with judgments called "cases" and advisory opinions called "questions". Three cases were disposed of during the court's first session, one during an extraordinary sitting between 8 January and 7 February 1923 (the Tunis-Morocco Nationality Question), four during the second ordinary sitting between 15 June 1923 and 15 September 1923 (Eastern Carelia Question, S.S. Wimbledon case, German Settlers Question, Acquisition of Polish Nationality Question) and one during a second extraordinary session from 12 November to 6 December 1923 (Jaworznia Question). A replacement for Ruy Barbosa (who had died on 1 March 1923 without hearing any cases) was also found, with the election of Epitácio Pessoa on 10 September 1923. The workload the following year was reduced, containing two judgments and one advisory opinion; the Mavrommatis Palestine Concessions Case, the Interpretation of the Treaty of Neuilly Case (the first case of the court's Chamber of Summary Procedure) and the Monastery of Saint-Naoum Question. During the same year, a new president and vice-president were elected, since they were mandated to serve for a term of three years. At the elections on 4 September 1924, André Weiss was again elected vice-president and Max Huber became the second president of the court. Judicial pensions were created at the same time, with a judge being given 1/30th of his annual pay for every year he had served once he had both retired and turned 65.

1925 was an exceedingly busy year for the court, which sat for 210 days, with four extraordinary sessions as well as the ordinary session, producing 3 judgments and 4 advisory opinions. The first judgment was given in the Exchange of Greek and Turkish Populations Case, the second (by the Court of Summary Procedure) was on the interpretation of the Interpretation of the Treaty of Neuilly Case, and the third in the Mavrommatis Palestine Concessions Case. The 4 advisory opinions issued by the court were in the Polish Postal Service in Danzig Question, the Expulsion of the Ecumenical Patriarch Question, the Treaty of Lausanne Question and the German Interests in Polish Upper Silesia Question. 1926 saw reduced business, with only one ordinary session and one extraordinary session; it was, however, the first year that all 11 judges had been present to hear cases. The court heard two cases, providing one judgment and one advisory opinion; a second question on German Interests in Polish Upper Silesia, this time a judgment rather than an advisory opinion, and an advisory opinion on the International Labour Organization.

Despite the reduction of work in 1926, 1927 was another busy year, the court sitting continuously from 15 June to 16 December, handing down 4 orders, 4 judgments and 1 advisory opinion. The judgments were in the Belgium-China Case, the Case Concerning the Factory at Chorzow, the Lotus Case and a continuation of the Mavrommatis Jerusalem Concessions Case. 3 of the advisory opinions were on the Competence of the European Commission on the Danube, and the 4th was on the Jurisdiction of Danzig Courts. The 4 orders were on the German Interests in Polish Upper Silesia. This year saw another set of elections; on 6 December, with Dionisio Anzilotti elected president and André Weiss elected vice-president. Weiss died the following year, and John Bassett Moore resigned; Max Huber was elected vice-president on 12 September 1928 to succeed Weiss, while a second death (Lord Finlay) left the court increasingly understaffed. Replacements for Moore and Finlay were elected on 19 September 1929; Henri Fromageot and Cecil Hurst respectively.

After the second round of elections in September 1930, the court was reorganised. On 16 January 1931 Mineichirō Adachi was appointed president, and Gustavo Guerrero vice-president.

=== Absence of the United States ===
The United States never joined the World Court, primarily because enemies of the League of Nations in the Senate argued that the court was too closely linked to the League of Nations. The leading opponent was Senator William Borah, Republican of Idaho. The United States finally recognised the court's jurisdiction, following a long and drawn out process. President Warren G. Harding had first suggested US involvement in 1923, and on 9 December 1929, three court protocols were signed. The U.S. demanded a veto over cases involving the U.S. but other nations rejected the idea.

President Franklin D. Roosevelt did not risk his political capital and gave only passive support even though a two-thirds vote of approval was needed in the Senate. A barrage of telegrams flooded Congress, inspired by attacks made by Charles Coughlin and others. The treaty failed by seven votes on 29 January 1935.

The United States finally accepted the court's jurisdiction on 28 December 1935, but the treaty was never ratified, and the U.S. never joined. Francis Boyle attributes the failure to a strong isolationist element in the US Senate, arguing that the ineffectiveness shown by US nonparticipation in the court and other international institutions could be linked to the start of the Second World War.

=== Growing international tension and dissolution of the court ===
1933 was a busy year for the court, which cleared its 20th case (and "greatest triumph"); the Eastern Greenland Case. This period was marked by growing international tension, however, with Japan and Germany announcing their withdrawal from the League of Nations, to come into effect in 1935. That did not directly affect the court, since the protocol accepting court jurisdiction was separately ratified, but it influenced whether a nation would be willing to bring a case before it, as evidenced by Germany's withdrawal from two pending cases. There were few cases in 1934 since the world's governments were more concerned with the growing international tension. The court's business continued to be small in 1935, 1936, 1937, 1938, and 1939 although 1937 was marked by Monaco's acceptance of the court protocol. The court's judicial output in 1940 consisted entirely of a set of orders, completed in a meeting between 19 and 26 February, caused by the beginning of World War II, which left the court with "uncertain prospects for the future". Following the German invasion of the Netherlands, the court was unable to meet although the registrar and president were afforded full diplomatic immunity. Informed that the situation would not be tolerated after diplomatic missions from other nations left The Hague on 16 July, the president and registrar left the Netherlands and moved to Switzerland, accompanied by their staff.

The court was unable to meet between 1941 and 1944, but the framework remained intact, and it soon became apparent that the court would be dissolved. In 1943, an international panel met to consider "the question of the Permanent Court of International Justice", meeting from 20 March to 10 February 1944. The panel agreed that the name and functioning of the court should be preserved but for some future court rather than a continuation of the current one. Between 21 August and 7 October 1944, the Dumbarton Oaks Conference was held, which, among other things, created an international court attached to the United Nations, to succeed the Permanent Court of International Justice. As a result of these conferences and others, the judges of the Permanent Court of International Justice officially resigned in October 1945 and, via a resolution by the League of Nations on 18 April 1946, the court and the league both ceased to exist, being replaced by the International Court of Justice and the United Nations.

== Organisation ==
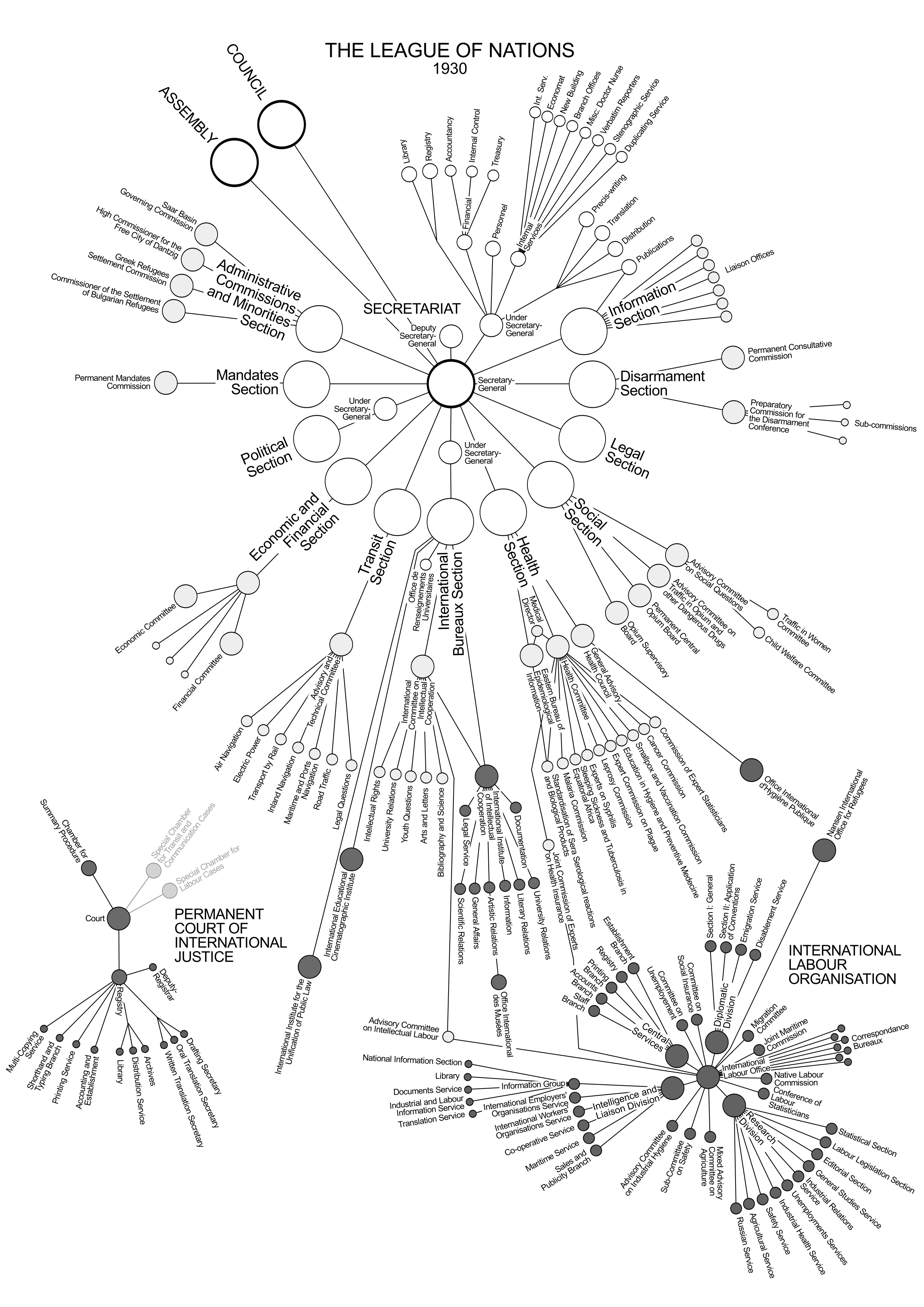
The Permanent Court (bottom left) in the League of Nations organisation.

=== Judges ===
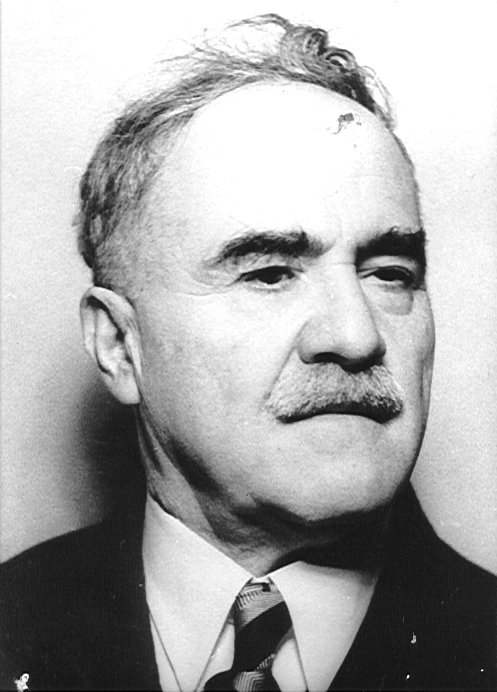
Max Huber, the first vice-president and second president of the Permanent Court of International Justice

The court initially consisted of 11 judges and 4 deputy judges, recommended by member states of the League of Nations to the Secretary general of the League of Nations, who would put them before the Council and Assembly for election. The Council and Assembly were to bear in mind that the elected panel of judges was to represent every major legal tradition in the league, along with "every major civilisation". Each member state was allowed to recommend 4 potential judges, with a maximum of 2 from its own nation. Judges were elected by a straight majority vote, held independently in the Council and Assembly. The judges served for a period of nine years, with their term limits all expiring at the same time, necessitating a completely new set of elections. The judges were independent and rid themselves of their nationality for the purposes of hearing cases, owing allegiance to no individual member state, but it was forbidden to have more than one judge from the same state. As a sign of their independence from national ties, judges were given full diplomatic immunity when engaged in court business. The only requirements for judges were "high moral character" and "the qualifications required in their respective countries [for] the highest judicial offices" or to be "jurisconsults of recognized competence in international law".

The first panel was elected on 14 September 1921, with the 4 deputies being elected on the 16th. On the first vote, Rafael Altamira y Crevea of Spain, Dionisio Anzilotti of Italy, Bernard Loder of the Netherlands, Ruy Barbosa of Brazil, Yorozu Oda of Japan, André Weiss of France, Antonio Sánchez de Bustamante y Sirven of Cuba and Lord Finlay of the United Kingdom were elected by a majority vote of both the Council and Assembly on the first ballot taken. The second ballot elected John Bassett Moore of the United States, and the sixth Didrik Nyholm of Denmark and Max Huber of Switzerland. As the deputy judges, Wang Ch'ung-hui of China, Demetre Negulesco of Romania and Mihailo Jovanović of Yugoslavia were elected. The Assembly and Council disagreed on the fourth deputy judge, but Frederik Beichmann of Norway was eventually appointed. Deputy judges were only substitutes for absent judges and were not afforded a vote in altering court procedure or contributing at other times. As such, they were allowed to act as counsel in international cases where they were not sitting as judges.

In 1930, the number of judges was increased to 15, and a new set of elections were held. The election was held on 25 September 1930, with 14 candidates receiving a majority on the first ballot and a 15th, Francisco José Urrutia, receiving a majority on the second. The full court was Urrutia, Mineichiro Adachi, Rafael Altamira y Crevea, Dionisio Anzilotti, Bustamante, Willem van Eysinga, Henri Fromageot, José Gustavo Guerrero, Cecil Hurst, Edouard Rolin-Jaequemyns, Frank B. Kellogg, Negulesco, Michał Jan Rostworowski, Walther Schücking and Wang Ch'ung-hui.

Judges were paid 15,000 Dutch florins a year, with daily expenses of 50 florins to pay for living expenses, and an additional 45,000 florins for the president, who was required to live at The Hague. Travelling expenses were also provided, and a "duty allowance" of 100 florins was provided when the court was sitting, with 150 for the vice-president. This duty allowance was limited to 20,000 florins a year for the judges and 30,000 florins for the vice-president; as such, it provided for 200 days of court hearings, with no allowance provided if the court sat for longer. The deputy judges received no salary but, when called up for service, were provided with travel expenses, 50 florins a day for living expenses and 150 florins a day as a duty allowance.

=== Procedure ===
Under the Covenant of the League of Nations, all League members agreed that if there was a dispute between states they "recognize to be suitable for submission to arbitration and which cannot be satisfactorily settled by diplomacy", the matter would be submitted to the court for arbitration, with suitable disputes being over the interpretation of an international treaty, a question on international law, the validity of facts, which, if true, would breach international obligations and the nature of any reparations to be made for breaching international obligations. The original statutes of the court provided that all 11 judges were required to sit in every case. There were three exceptions: when reviewing Labour Clauses from a peace treaty such as the Treaty of Versailles (which was done by a special chamber of five judges, appointed every three years), when reviewing cases on communications or transport arising from a peace treaty (which used a similar procedure) and when hearing summary procedure cases, which were reviewed by a panel of three judges.

To prevent the appearance of any bias in the court's makeup, if there was a judge belonging to one member state on the panel and the other member state was not "represented", they had the ability to select an ad hoc judge of their own nationality to hear the case. In a full court hearing, that increased the number to twelve; in one of the five-man chambers, the new judge took the place of one of the original five. That did not apply to summary procedure cases. The ad hoc judge, selected by the member state, was expected to fulfil all the requirements of a normal judge; the president of the court had ultimate discretion over whether to authorise him to sit. The court was mandated to open on 15 June each year and continue until all cases were finished, with extraordinary sessions if required; by 1927, there were more extraordinary sessions than ordinary ones. The court's business being conducted in English and French as official languages, and hearings were public unless it was otherwise specified.

After receiving files in a case calculated to lead to a judgment, the judges would exchange their views informally on the salient legal points of the case, and a time limit for producing a judgment would then be set. Then, each judge would write an anonymous summary containing his opinion; the opinions would be circulated among the court for 2 or 3 days before the president drafted a judgment containing a summary of those submitted by individual judges. The court would then agree on the decision that they wished to reach, along with the main points of argument they wished to use. Once this was done, a committee of four, including the president, the registrar and two judges elected by secret ballot, drafted a final judgment, which was then voted on by the entire court. Once a final judgment was set, it was given to the public and the press. Every judgment contained the reasons behind the decision and the judges assenting; dissenting judges were allowed to deliver their own judgment, with all judgments read in open court before the agents of the parties to the dispute. Judgments could not be revised except on the discovery of some fact unknown when the court sat but not if the fact was known but not discussed because of negligence.

The court also issued "advisory opinions", which arose from Article 14 of the covenant creating the court, which provided, "The Court may also give an advisory opinion upon any dispute referred to it by the Council or Assembly". Goodrich interprets that as indicating that the drafters intended a purely advisory capacity for the court, not a binding one. Manley Ottmer Hudson (who sat as a judge) said that an advisory opinion "was what it purported to be. It is advisory. It is not in any sense a judgement ... hence it is not in any way binding on any state", but Charles De Visscher argued that in certain situations, an advisory opinion could be binding on the League of Nations Council and, under certain circumstances, some states; M. Politis agreed, saying that the court's advisory opinions were equivalent to a binding judgment. In 1927, the court appointed a committee to look at this issue, and it reported that "where there are in fact contending parties, the difference between contentious cases and advisory cases is only nominal ... so the view that advisory opinions are not binding is more theoretical than real". In practice, advisory opinions were usually followed, mostly due to the fear that if this "revolutionary" international court's decisions were not followed, it would undermine its authority. The court retained the discretion to avoid giving an advisory opinion, which it used on occasion.

=== Registrar and registry ===
Other than the judges, the court also included a registrar and his secretariat, the registry. When the court met for its initial session, opened on 30 January 1922 to allow for the establishment of procedure and the appointment of court officials, the secretary-general of the League of Nations passed an emergency resolution through the Assembly, which designated an official of the league and his staff as the registrar and registry respectively, with the first registrar being Åke Hammarskjöld. The registrar, required to reside within The Hague, was initially tasked with drawing up a plan to create an efficient secretariat, using the smallest number of staff possible and costing as little as possible. As a result, he decided to have each member of the secretariat as the head of a particular department, so the numbers of actual employees could be increased or decreased as necessary without impacting on the actual registry. In 1927, the post of deputy-registrar was created, tasked with dealing with legal research for the court and answering all diplomatic correspondence received by the registry.

The first deputy-registrar was Paul Ruegger; after his resignation on 17 August 1928, Julio Lopez Olivan was selected to succeed him. Olivan resigned in 1931 to take over from Hammarskjöld as registrar, and was replaced by M. L. J. H. Jorstad.

The three principal officers of the registry, after the registrar and deputy-registrar, were the three editing secretaries. The first editing secretary, known as the drafting secretary, was tasked with drafting the court's publications (including the Confidential Bulletin, a document exclusively received by judges of the court) and Sections D and E of the official journal, comprising the legislative clauses conferring jurisdiction on the court and the court's Annual Report. The second editing secretary, known as the oral secretary, was mainly responsible for the oral interpretation and translation of the court's discussions. For public hearings, he was assisted by interpreters, but for private meetings, only he, the registrar and the deputy-registrar were admitted. As a result of this duty, the oral secretary was also tasked with writing Section C of the official journal, which comprised the oral interpretations of court minutes, along with cases and questions put before the court. The third secretary, known as the written secretary, was tasked with the written translations of the court's business, which were "both numerous and voluminous". He was assisted in this by the other secretaries and by translators for languages not his own; all secretaries were expected to speak English and French fluently and to have working knowledge of German and Spanish.

The registry was split into several departments: the Archives, the Accounting and Establishment, the Printing Service and the Copying Department. The Archives included a distribution service for the court's documents and the legal texts used by the court itself and was described as one of the most difficult departments to organise. The Accounting and Establishment Department dealt with the requests for and allocation of the court's yearly budget, which was drawn up by the registrar, approved by the court and submitted to the League of Nations. The Printing Department, run from a single printing plant in Leiden, was created to allow the circulation of the court's publications. The Copying Department comprised shorthand, typing and copying services, and included secretaries for the registrar and judges, emergency reporters capable of taking notes down verbatim and copyists; the smallest of the departments, it comprised between 12 and 40 staff depending on the business of the court.

== Cases ==
=== Contentious cases ===
- S.S. Wimbledon case, 1923
- Mavrommatis Palestine Concessions, 1924
- Interpretation of the Treaty of Neuilly Case, 1924
- Mavrommatis Jerusalem Concessions, 1925
- Certain German Interests in Polish Upper Silesia, 1926
- Factory at Chorzów case, 1927
- The Lotus case, 1927
- Rights of Minorities in Upper Silesia (Minority Schools), 1928
- Free Zones of Upper Savoy and the District of Gex (France v Switzerland)
- Brazilian Loans case, 1929
- Serbian Loans case, 1929
- Territorial Jurisdiction of the International Commission of the Oder River Case, 1929
- Legal Status of the South-Eastern Territory of Greenland, 1932
- Lighthouses case between France and Greece, 1934
- Oscar Chinn case, 1934
- Minority Schools in Albania case, 1935
- Losinger case, 1936
- Diversion of Water from the Meuse case, 1937
- Borchgrave case, 1937
- Phosphates in Morocco case, 1938
- Panevezys-Saldutiskis Railway case, 1939
- Electricity Company of Sofia and Bulgaria case, 1939
- Société Commerciale de Belgique, 1939

=== Advisory opinions ===
- Status of Eastern Carelia, 1923
- Nationality Decrees Issued in Tunis and Morocco, 1923
- German Settlers in Poland, 1923
- Jaworzina, 1923
- Monastery of Saint-Naoum Question, 1924
- Exchange of Greek and Turkish Populations Question, 1925
- Polish Postal Service in Danzig Question, 1925
- the Expulsion of the Ecumenical Patriarch Question
- the Treaty of Lausanne Question
- Competence of the International Labour Organisation to Regulate Incidentally the Personal Work of the Employer, 1926
- Jurisdiction of the European Commission of the Danube
- Jurisdiction of the Courts of Danzig Case, 1928
- Greco-Bulgarian "Communities" Question, 1930
- Interpretation of the Greco-Turkish Agreement, 1928
- Access to German Minority Schools in Upper Silesia, 1931
- Customs Regime between Germany and Austria Question, 1931
- Railway Traffic between Lithuania and Poland Question, 1931
- Interpretation of the Greco-Bulgarian Agreement, 1932
- Free Zones of Upper Savoy and the District of Gex, 1932
- Interpretation of the Convention of 1919 concerning Employment of Women during the Night, 1932

== Jurisdiction ==
The court's jurisdiction was largely optional, but there were some situations in which they had "compulsory jurisdiction", and states were required to refer cases to them. That came from three sources: the Optional Clause of the League of Nations, general international conventions and "special bipartite international treaties". The Optional Clause was a clause attached to the protocol establishing the court and required all signatories to refer certain classes of dispute to the court, with compulsory judgments resulting. There were approximately 30 international conventions under which the court had similar jurisdiction, including the Treaty of Versailles, the Air Navigation Convention, the Treaty of St. Germain and all mandates signed by the League of Nations. It was also foreseen that there would be clauses inserted in bipartite international treaties, which would allow the referral of disputes to the court; that occurred, with such provisions found in treaties between Czechoslovakia and Austria, and between Czechoslovakia and Poland.

Throughout its existence, the court widened its jurisdiction as much as possible. Strictly speaking, the court's jurisdiction was only for disputes between states, but it regularly accepted disputes that were between a state and an individual if a second state brought the individual's case to the court. It argued that the second state asserted its rights, and the cases therefore became one between two states.

The proviso that the court was for disputes that could not "be satisfactorily settled by diplomacy" never made it require evidence that diplomatic discussions had been attempted before bringing the case. In the Loan Cases, it asserted jurisdiction despite the fact that there was no alleged breach of international law, and it could not be shown that there was any international element to the claim. The court justified itself by saying that the Covenant of the League of Nations allowed it to have jurisdiction in cases over "the existence of any fact which, if established, would constitute a breach of international obligations" and argued that since the fact "may be of any kind", it had jurisdiction if the dispute is one of municipal law. It had been long established that municipal law may be considered as a side point to a dispute over international law, but the Loan Cases discussed municipal law without the application of any international points.

== See also ==
- Commissions of the Danube River
- League of Nations archives
- Permanent Court of International Justice cases
- Total Digital Access to the League of Nations Archives Project (LONTAD)

== Bibliography ==
- Accinelli, Robert D. "The Roosevelt Administration and the World Court Defeat, 1935". Historian 40.3 (1978): 463–478.
- Boyle, Francis Anthony (1985). World politics and international law. Duke University Press. ISBN 978-0-8223-0655-9.
- de Bustamante Y. Sirven, Antonio S. (1923). "The Permanent Court of International Justice". Minnesota Law Review (9). University of Minnesota Law School. ISSN 0026-5535.
- Dunne, Michael. "Isolationism of a Kind: Two Generations of World Court Historiography in the United States". Journal of American Studies 21#3 (1987): 327–351.
- Dunne, Michael. The United States and the World Court, 1920–1935 (1988).
- Goodrich, Leland M. (1938). "The Nature of the Advisory Opinions of the Permanent Court of International Justice". The American Journal of International Law. 32 (4). American Society of International Law: 738–758. doi:10.2307/2190594. ISSN 0002-9300. JSTOR 2190594. S2CID 147163061.
- Hammarskjöld, Å. (1927). "Sidelights on the Permanent Court of International Justice". Harvard Law Review. 25 (4): 327–353. doi:10.2307/1279363. ISSN 0026-2234. JSTOR 1279363.
- Hammarskjöld, Å. (1923). "The Early Work of the Permanent Court of International Justice". Michigan Law Review. 36 (6): 704–725. doi:10.2307/1328280. ISSN 0017-811X. JSTOR 1328280.
- Hill, Norman L. (1931). "National Judges in the Permanent Court of International Justice". The American Journal of International Law. 25 (4). American Society of International Law: 670–683. doi:10.2307/2189917. ISSN 0002-9300. JSTOR 2189917. S2CID 147690819.
- Hudson, Manley O. (1922). "The Permanent Court of International Justice". Harvard Law Review. 35 (3): 245–275. doi:10.2307/1329614. ISSN 0026-2234. JSTOR 1329614.
- Hudson, Manley O. (January 1923). "The First Year of the Permanent Court of International Justice". Harvard Law Review. 17 (1). ISSN 0017-811X.
- Hudson, Manley O. (July 1923). "The Work and the Jurisdiction of the Permanent Court of International Justice". Proceedings of the Academy of Political Science in the City of New York. 10 (3). Academy of Political Science: 115–123. doi:10.2307/1171805. ISSN 1548-7237. JSTOR 1171805.
- Hudson, Manley O. (1924). "The Second Year of the Permanent Court of International Justice". The American Journal of International Law. 18 (1). American Society of International Law: 1–37. doi:10.2307/2189220. ISSN 0002-9300. JSTOR 2189220. S2CID 147068086.
- Hudson, Manley O. (1925). "The Third Year of the Permanent Court of International Justice". The American Journal of International Law. 19 (1). American Society of International Law: 48–75. doi:10.2307/2189082. ISSN 0002-9300. JSTOR 2189082. S2CID 147690767.
- Hudson, Manley O. (1926). "The Fourth Year of the Permanent Court of International Justice". The American Journal of International Law. 20 (1). American Society of International Law. ISSN 0002-9300.
- Hudson, Manley O. (1927). "The Fifth Year of the Permanent Court of International Justice". The American Journal of International Law. 21 (1). American Society of International Law: 26–35. doi:10.2307/2188593. ISSN 0002-9300. JSTOR 2188593. S2CID 147439381.
- Hudson, Manley O. (1928). "The Sixth Year of the Permanent Court of International Justice". The American Journal of International Law. 22 (1). American Society of International Law. ISSN 0002-9300.
- Hudson, Manley O. (1929). "The Seventh Year of the Permanent Court of International Justice". The American Journal of International Law. 23 (1). American Society of International Law: 1–29. doi:10.2307/2190232. ISSN 0002-9300. JSTOR 2190232. S2CID 147335984.
- Hudson, Manley O. (January 1930). "The Eighth Year of the Permanent Court of International Justice". The American Journal of International Law. 24 (1). American Society of International Law. ISSN 0002-9300.
- Hudson, Manley O. (1930). "The Election of Members of the Permanent Court of International Justice". The American Journal of International Law. 25 (4). American Society of International Law. ISSN 0002-9300.
- Hudson, Manley O. (1931). "The Ninth Year of the Permanent Court of International Justice". The American Journal of International Law. 25 (1). American Society of International Law. ISSN 0002-9300.
- Hudson, Manley O. (1932). "The Tenth Year of the Permanent Court of International Justice". The American Journal of International Law. 26 (1). American Society of International Law. doi:10.2307/2190212. ISSN 0002-9300. JSTOR 2190212. S2CID 147498530.
- Hudson, Manley O. (1933). "The Eleventh Year of the Permanent Court of International Justice". The American Journal of International Law. 27 (1). American Society of International Law: 11–38. doi:10.2307/2189781. ISSN 0002-9300. JSTOR 2189781. S2CID 146921184.
- Hudson, Manley O. (1934). "The Twelfth Year of the Permanent Court of International Justice". The American Journal of International Law. 28 (1). American Society of International Law: 1–18. doi:10.2307/2190290. ISSN 0002-9300. JSTOR 2190290. S2CID 146934110.
- Hudson, Manley O. (1935). "The Thirteenth Year of the Permanent Court of International Justice". The American Journal of International Law. 29 (1). American Society of International Law. ISSN 0002-9300.
- Hudson, Manley O. (January 1936). "The Fourteenth Year of the Permanent Court of International Justice". The American Journal of International Law. 30 (1). American Society of International Law. ISSN 0002-9300.
- Jacoby, Sidney B. (1936). "Some Aspects of the Jurisdiction of the Permanent Court of International Justice". The American Journal of International Law. 30 (2). American Society of International Law: 233–255. doi:10.2307/2191089. ISSN 0002-9300. JSTOR 2191089. S2CID 146929876.
- Hudson, Manley O. (1937). "The Fifteenth Year of the Permanent Court of International Justice". The American Journal of International Law. 31 (1). American Society of International Law: 1–16. doi:10.2307/2190710. ISSN 0002-9300. JSTOR 2190710. S2CID 147117212.
- Hudson, Manley O. (1938). "The Sixteenth Year of the Permanent Court of International Justice". The American Journal of International Law. 32 (1). American Society of International Law: 1–18. doi:10.2307/2190628. ISSN 0002-9300. JSTOR 2190628. S2CID 146815934.
- Hudson, Manley O. (1939). "The Seventeenth Year of the Permanent Court of International Justice". The American Journal of International Law. 33 (1). American Society of International Law: 1–11. doi:10.2307/2190835. ISSN 0002-9300. JSTOR 2190835.
- Hudson, Manley O. (1940). "The Eighteenth Year of the Permanent Court of International Justice". The American Journal of International Law. 34 (1). American Society of International Law: 1–22. doi:10.2307/2192961. ISSN 0002-9300. JSTOR 2192961. S2CID 147181932.
- Hudson, Manley O. (1941). "The Nineteenth Year of the Permanent Court of International Justice". The American Journal of International Law. 35 (1). American Society of International Law: 1–11. doi:10.2307/2192595. ISSN 0002-9300. JSTOR 2192595. S2CID 146862789.
- Hudson, Manley O. (1945). "The Twenty-Third Year of the Permanent Court of International Justice". The American Journal of International Law. 36 (1). American Society of International Law. ISSN 0002-9300.
- Hudson, Manley O. (1957). "The Succession of the International Court of Justice to the Permanent Court of International". The American Journal of International Law. 51 (3). American Society of International Law. doi:10.2307/2195063. ISSN 0002-9300. JSTOR 2195063. S2CID 146855383.
- Kahn, Gilbert N. "Presidential Passivity on a Nonsalient Issue: President Franklin D. Roosevelt and the 1935 World Court Fight". Diplomatic History 4.2 (1980): 137–160.
- Moore, John Bassett (1922). "The Organization of the Permanent Court of International Justice". Columbia Law Review. 22 (6). Columbia Law School: 497–526. doi:10.2307/1111551. ISSN 0010-1958. JSTOR 1111551.
- Pomerance, Michla (1996). The United States and The World Court as a "Supreme Court of the Nations": Dreams, Illusions and Disillusion. Martinus Nijhoff. pp. 132–33. ISBN 9041102043.
- Scott, James Brown (1920). "A Permanent Court of International Justice". The American Journal of International Law. 14 (4). American Society of International Law. ISSN 0002-9300.
- Scott, James Brown (1921). "The Election of Judges for the Permanent Court of International Justice". The American Journal of International Law. 15 (4). American Society of International Law. ISSN 0002-9300.
- World Peace Foundation Pamphlet Series, vol. 580, World Peace Foundation, 1925, OCLC 426522229
