= Henri Fromageot =

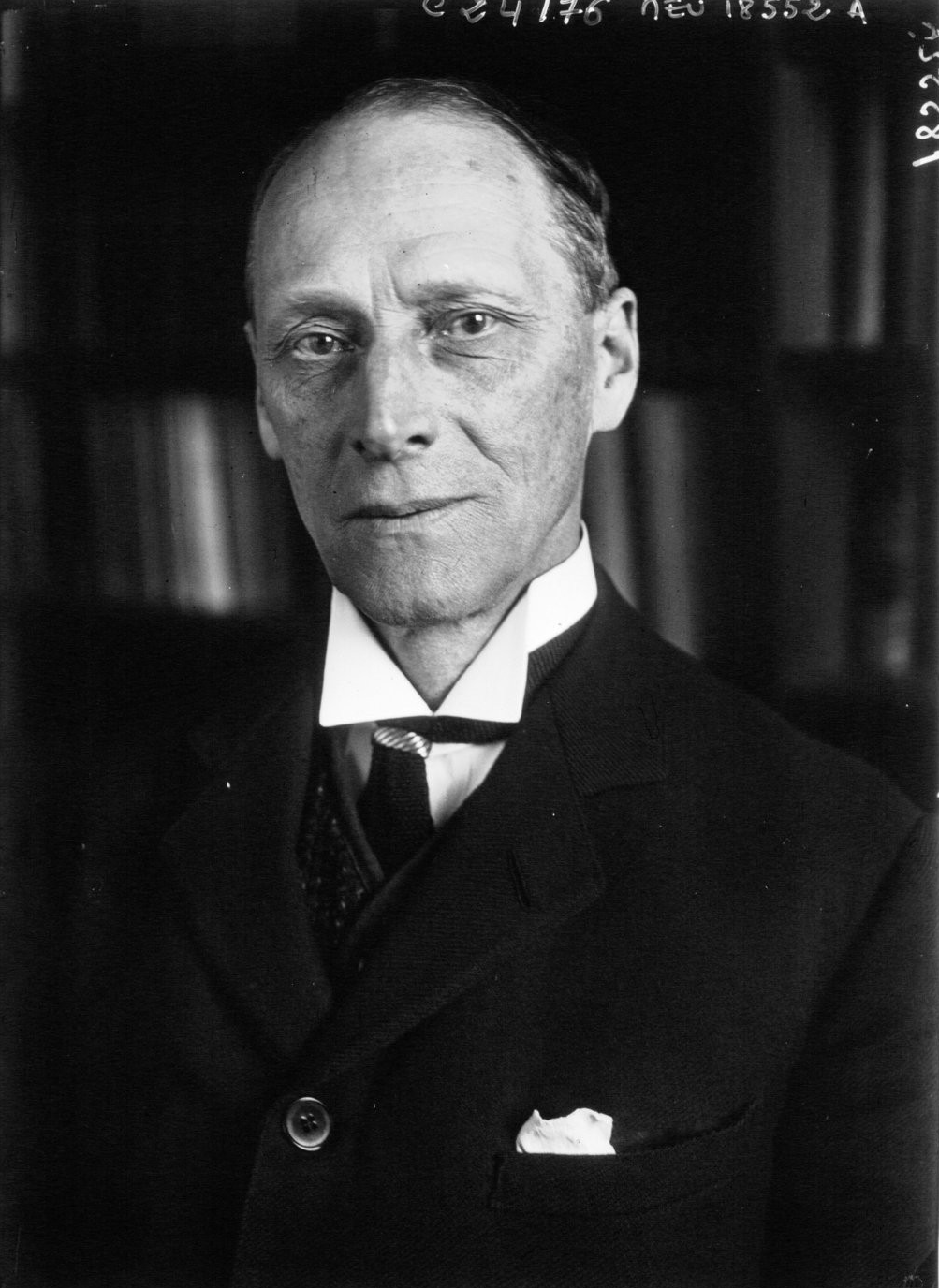

Henri Fromageot (10 September 1864 – 11 September 1949 ) was a French lawyer and judge. He studied at the University of Paris, University of Oxford and University of Leipzig, gaining a gold medal at Paris in 1891 and serving as the Doctor of Law in the University of Paris Law Faculty. At the end of World War I, Fromageot served as the French representative on the Paris Peace Conference's drafting committee. On 19 September 1929 he became a judge of the Permanent Court of International Justice, succeeding André Weiss. He held this position until the judges resigned in October 1945.

== Bibliography ==
- League of Nations (1930). Publications of the Permanent Court of International Justice: Annual report, Volume 5. League of Nations.
