= Yorozu Oda =

Japanese politician

- 織田 萬
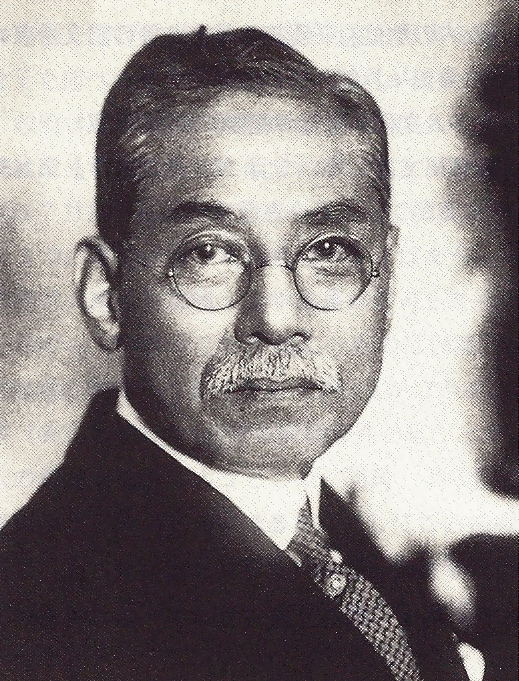

Judge of the Permanent Court of International Justice
- In office January 1922 – 6 December 1930
- Preceded by: Position established
- Succeeded by: Mineichirō Adachi

Member of the House of Peers
- In office 7 August 1931 – 26 May 1945 Nominated by the Emperor

Personal details
- Born: 21 August 1868 Hizen Province, Japan
- Died: 26 May 1945 (aged 76) Tokyo, Japan
- Education: Tokyo Imperial University

Yorozu Oda (織田 萬, Oda Yorozu; 21 August 1868 – 26 May 1945) was a Japanese lawyer, academic and judge who served as one of the first Judges of the Permanent Court of International Justice. From 1899 to 1930 he served as a professor at the Tokyo Imperial University, where he was an expert in ancient Chinese law and administrative law. In 1921 he was appointed to the Permanent Court of International Justice, where he heard 30 cases, dissenting from the main judgment once.

== Bibliography ==
- Wolfrum, Rüdiger (2002). Liber amicorum Judge Shigeru Oda. Vol. 1. BRILL. ISBN 90-411-1797-0.
- Spiermann, Ole (2005). International legal argument in the Permanent Court of International Justice: the rise of the international judiciary. Cambridge University Press. ISBN 0-521-83685-9.
