= John Bassett Moore =

American jurist (1860–1947)

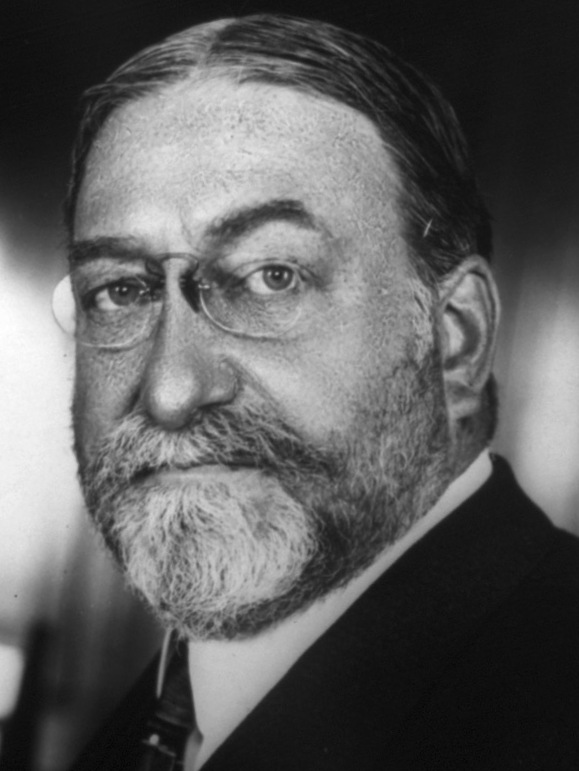

Judge of the Permanent Court of International Justice
- In office January 1922 – April 11, 1928
- Succeeded by: Charles Evans Hughes

2nd Counselor of the United States Department of State
- In office April 23, 1913 – March 4, 1914
- President: Woodrow Wilson
- Preceded by: Chandler P. Anderson
- Succeeded by: Robert Lansing

23rd United States Assistant Secretary of State
- In office April 27, 1898 – September 6, 1898
- President: William McKinley
- Preceded by: William R. Day
- Succeeded by: David Jayne Hill

5th Third Assistant Secretary of State
- In office August 6, 1886 – September 30, 1891
- President: Grover Cleveland; Benjamin Harrison
- Preceded by: Alvey A. Adee
- Succeeded by: William Morton Grinnell

Personal details
- Born: December 3, 1860 Smyrna, Delaware
- Died: November 12, 1947 (aged 86) New York, New York
- Party: Republican
- Profession: Politician, author, lawyer, professor

John Bassett Moore (December 3, 1860 – November 12, 1947) was an American lawyer and authority on international law. Moore was a State Department official, a professor at Columbia University, and a judge of the Permanent Court of International Justice from 1922 to 1928, the first American judge to sit on that judicial body.

== Biography ==
Moore was born in Smyrna, Delaware on December 3, 1860.

Moore graduated from the University of Virginia and was admitted to the Delaware bar in 1883. He practiced law in Wilmington, Delaware, before working as a law clerk at the Department of State from 1885 to 1886. He was the third assistant secretary of state from 1886 to 1891, when he became Hamilton Fish Professorship of International Law and Diplomacy at Columbia Law School, the first chair of international law in the United States. Moore remained a Columbia professor until retiring in 1924, taking frequent leaves of absence to take up U.S. diplomatic posts.

Moore briefly was assistant secretary of state in 1898.

During his service with the Department of State he acted as secretary to the Conference on Samoan Affairs (1887) and to the Fisheries Conference (1887–1888).

After the close of the war with Spain was secretary and council to the American Peace Commission at Paris. In 1901, he served as professor of International Law at the Naval War College, where he initiated that college's long series of "International Law Blue Book" publications. Subsequently, Moore represented the government as agent before the United States and Dominican Arbitration Tribunal (1904), as delegate to the Fourth International American Conference at Buenos Aires and special plenipotentiary to the Chilean centenary (both 1910), and as delegate to the International Commission of Jurists at Rio de Janeiro (1912).

Moore's most popular work was the eight-volume Digest of International Law (1906). After completing the work, he suffered a nervous breakdown. He subsequently took a vacation for more than two years, traveling the world.

Moore was elected to the American Philosophical Society in 1907 and the American Academy of Arts and Sciences in 1919.

He was on the Hague Tribunal from 1912 to 1938.

Moore was a critic of the League of Nations, considering it a weak institution.

In 1921, Moore was elected a judge of the Permanent Court of International Justice. While on the bench, he declined the position of the court presidency multiple times, arguing that an overseas judge should not hold that position. He resigned from the court in 1928 in order to focus on his scientific obligations.

Moore was a proponent of neutrality, believing that the post-World War I system of alliances would tend to broaden wars into global conflicts. He was also a strong believer in the principle of separation of powers under the United States Constitution, asserting in 1921, "There can hardly be room for doubt that the framers of the constitution, when they vested in Congress the power to declare war, never imagined that they were leaving it to the executive to use the military and naval forces of the United States all over the world for the purpose of actually coercing other nations, occupying their territory, and killing their soldiers and citizens, all according to his own notions of the fitness of things, as long as he refrained from calling his action war or persisted in calling it peace."

== Legacy and awards ==
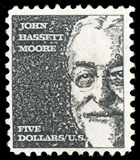
John Bassett Moore postage stamp

Moore was honored on a U.S. definitive postage stamp issued December 3, 1966, the five-dollar value of the Prominent Americans series.

In 1922, a new school was dedicated to Moore in his hometown of Smyrna, Delaware. The John Bassett Moore Intermediate School now serves as a public school for the fifth and sixth grades.

In 1927, Moore was awarded the Theodore Roosevelt Medal.

Moore died at his home in New York City on November 12, 1947, and was buried in Woodlawn Cemetery.

== Works ==
- Reports on Extraterritorial Crime (1887)
- Extradition and Interstate Rendition (two volumes, 1891)
- American Notes on the Conflict of Laws (1896)
- History and Digest of International Arbitrations (6 vols., 1898)
- American Diplomacy (1905)
- Digest of International Law (8 vols., 1906)
- Works of James Buchanan (12 vols., 1909–1911, reissued 1960)
- Four Phases of American Development (1912)
- International Law and Some Current Illusions (1924)
- The Permanent Court of International Justice (1924)
- International Adjudications, Ancient and Modern (8 vols., 1937)
- Collected Papers (7 vols., 1945)

Government offices
Preceded by Alvey A. Adee	Third Assistant Secretary of State; August 6, 1886 – September 30, 1891	Succeeded by William Morton Grinnell
Preceded by William R. Day	United States Assistant Secretary of State; April 27, 1898 – September 6, 1898	Succeeded by David Jayne Hill
