= Cecil Hurst =

British judge

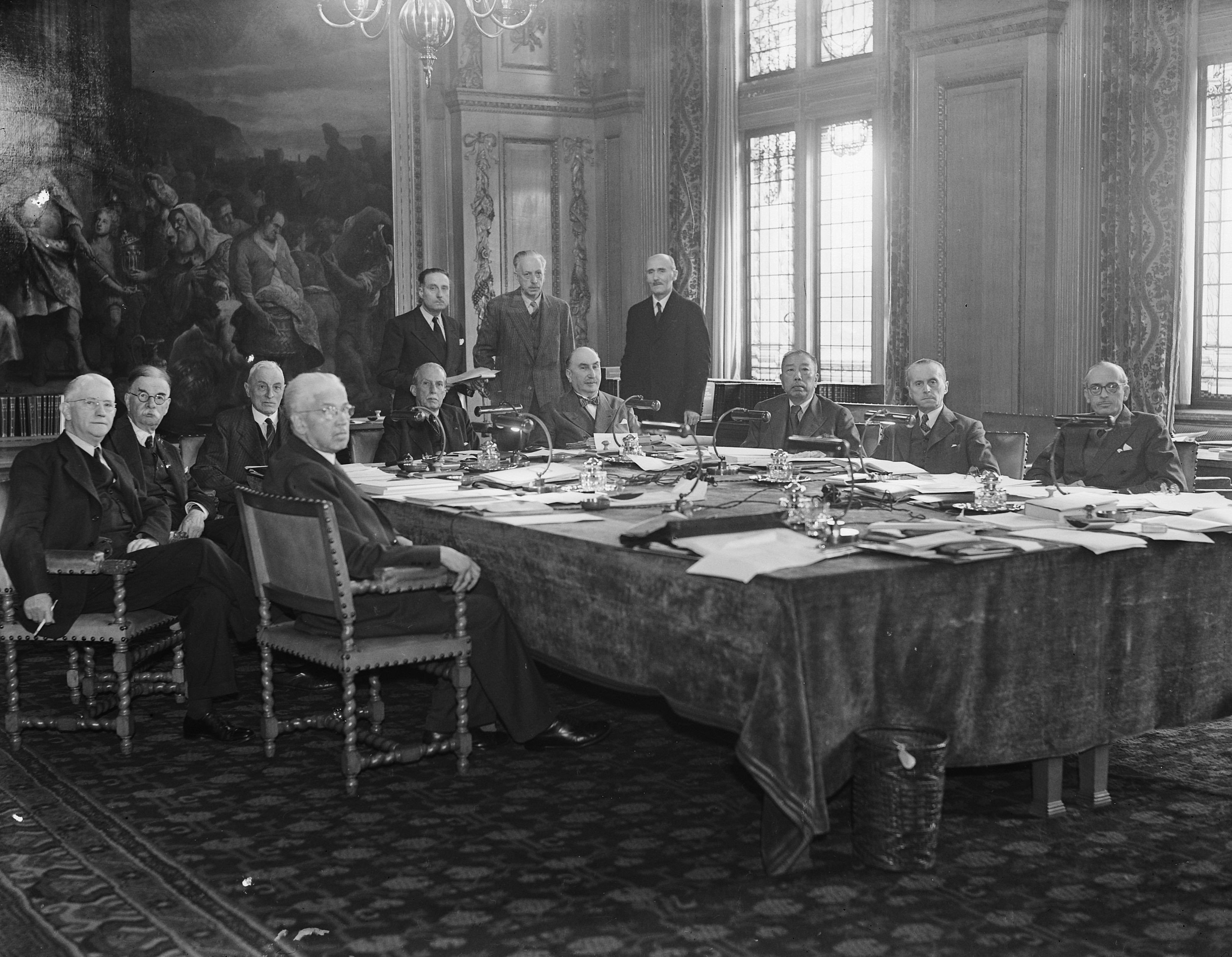
Cecil Hurst at the Permanent Court of International Justice (1945)

Sir Cecil James Barrington Hurst, GCMG, KCB, QC (28 October 1870 – 27 March 1963) was a British international lawyer. He worked from 1929 to 1945 as a judge to the Permanent Court of International Justice in The Hague, serving from 1934 to 1936 as president of the court.

== Early life and education ==
Hurst was born in Horsham, Sussex, the son of Robert Henry Hurst (1817–1905) and his wife Matilda Jane Scott. His father and paternal grandfather, Robert Henry Hurst (1788–1857), were both Members of Parliament (MP) for Horsham. He was educated at Westminster School and studied jurisprudence at Trinity College, Cambridge, earning an LL.B. in 1892.

== Career ==
In June 1902 Hurst began a career in the British Foreign Office as Assistant Legal Adviser. In 1918 he became Principal Legal Adviser. During this time Hurst was a delegate of the United Kingdom at the Hague Convention in 1907, and one year later with London Naval Conference, at which maritime law was crafted. After the end of the First World War he attended the Paris Peace Conference, 1919 as the British Empire Delegation's representative on the drafting committee. During the 1920s he represented Britain several times before the Permanent Court. In 1929 he became a member of the Permanent Court of International Justice, and remained a member up to its dissolution in October 1945. During this time he worked from 1934 to 1936 as a president and afterwards until 1945 as a vice-president of the court.

Hurst was honoured as CB in 1907, KC in 1913, KCB in 1920, KCMG in 1924, and GCMG in 1926. The University of Cambridge awarded him an honorary doctorate in 1928.

An oil painting of Hurst, by British artist William Dring A.R.A, can be seen in the Library of Horsham Museum.

== Selected works ==
- The British Year Book of International Law. London 1925 (as editor)
- A Plea for the Codification of International Law on new Lines. In: Transactions of the Grotius Society. 32/1946. Oxford University press, S. 135-153
- International Law: The Collected Papers of Sir Cecil Hurst. London 1950

== Literature ==
- Biographical Notes concerning the Judges. Sir Cecil J. B. Hurst. In: Sixth Annual report of the permanently Court of internationally Justice. A.W. Sijthoff' s Publishing, Leiden 1930, S. 20/21
- Charles de Visscher, Kenneth Carpmael, C. John Colombos: Sir Cecil Hurst: Two Tributes. In: International and Comparative Law Quarterly. 13 (1)/1964. Cambridge University press, pp. 1–5
