= Bernard Loder =

Dutch diplomat and jurist

Bernard Cornelis Johannes Loder
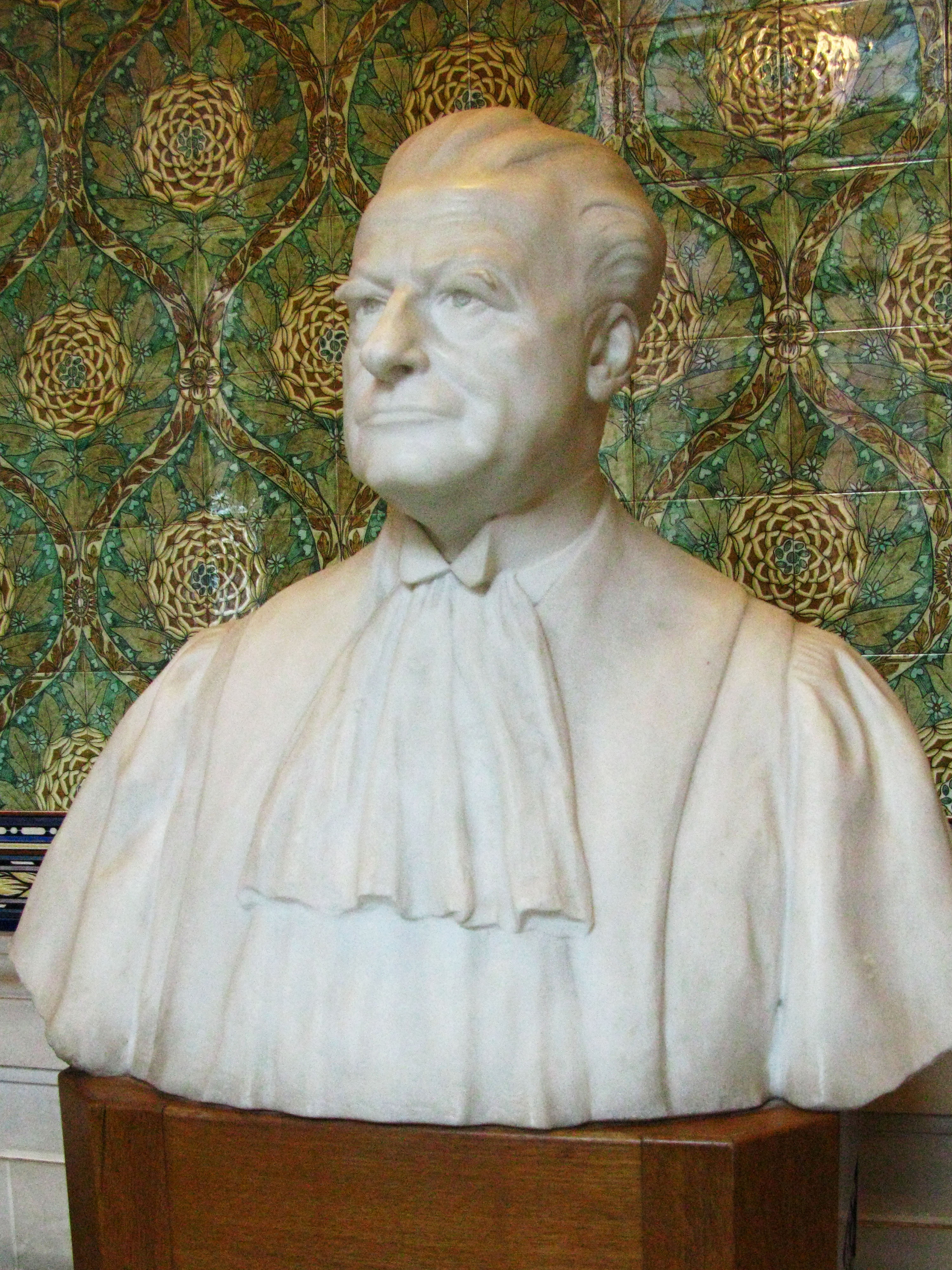
- Bernard Cornelis Johannes Loder
- Born: 13 September 1849; Amsterdam, Netherlands
- Died: 4 November 1935; The Hague, Netherlands
- Title: Justice of Supreme Court of the Netherlands (1908–1921), President of the Permanent Court of International Justice (1921–1924), Judge of the Permanent Court of Internal Justice (1924–1930)

Bernard Cornelis Johannes Loder (13 September 1849, Amsterdam – 4 November 1935, The Hague) was a Dutch jurist. He sat on the Supreme Court of the Netherlands from 1908 to 1921. He then sat as a judge of the Permanent Court of International Justice from 1921 to 1930, serving as the first president of that court from 1921 to 1924.

== Early life and education ==
Born in 1849, Bernard Loder studied law in Amsterdam at the Athenaeum Illustre of Amsterdam, the predecessor to the University of Amsterdam, and afterward studied at University of Leiden. He was interested in the study of international law and in particular maritime law.

== Domestic and international career ==
Loder sat on the Supreme Court of the Netherlands from 1908 to 1921. In 1920, he served on the committee that drew up the Statute of the Permanent Court of International Justice. He was a judge of that court from 1921 to 1930, serving as its first president until 1924.

He represented the Netherlands at international conferences on maritime law in 1905, 1909, 1910, and 1923. He served as one of the Dutch delegates at the Paris Peace Conference in 1919.

== Memberships and honors ==
In 1897, Loder was one of the founders of the International Maritime Committee, the functions of which were later taken on by the International Maritime Organization. Loder became a member of the Institut de Droit International in 1921 and served as its president and four years later President at its 33rd meeting in The Hague.

== Personal life ==
Bernard Loder was married in 1877 and had two daughters. He died in 1935 in The Hague.
