= Dionisio Anzilotti =

Italian judge and legal scholar (1867–1950)

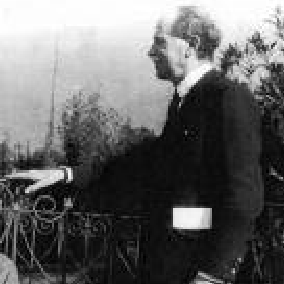
Anzilotti in 1937

Dionisio Anzilotti (20 February 1867 – 23 August 1950) was an Italian jurist and judge of the Permanent Court of International Justice.

After law studies in Pisa, Anzilotti taught international law in Florence, Palermo, Bologna and Rome from 1892 to 1937. One of the main proponents of Heinrich Triepel's theory of dualism, his textbook of international law, Corso di diritto internazionale. Vol. I: Introduzione e teorie generali (3d. ed. 1928) was translated into several languages.

Anzilotti was the secretary-general of the League of Nations expert commission preparing the Permanent Court of International Justice. He was a member of that court from 1921 to 1946 and presided it 1928–30. Notably, in the 1923 S.S. "Wimbledon" case, he was the only PCIJ judge to ever vote against a suit brought by the government of his own country.

He became a foreign member of the Royal Netherlands Academy of Arts and Sciences in 1936, and was elected a Foreign Honorary Member of the American Academy of Arts and Sciences in 1938.

== Works ==
- Diritto Internazionale nei Giudizi Interni (Bologna, 1905)
- Corso di Diritto Internazionale (Rome, 1915)
- Cours de Droit International (Paris, 1929)
