= Rafael Altamira y Crevea =

Spanish historian and jurist (1866–1951)

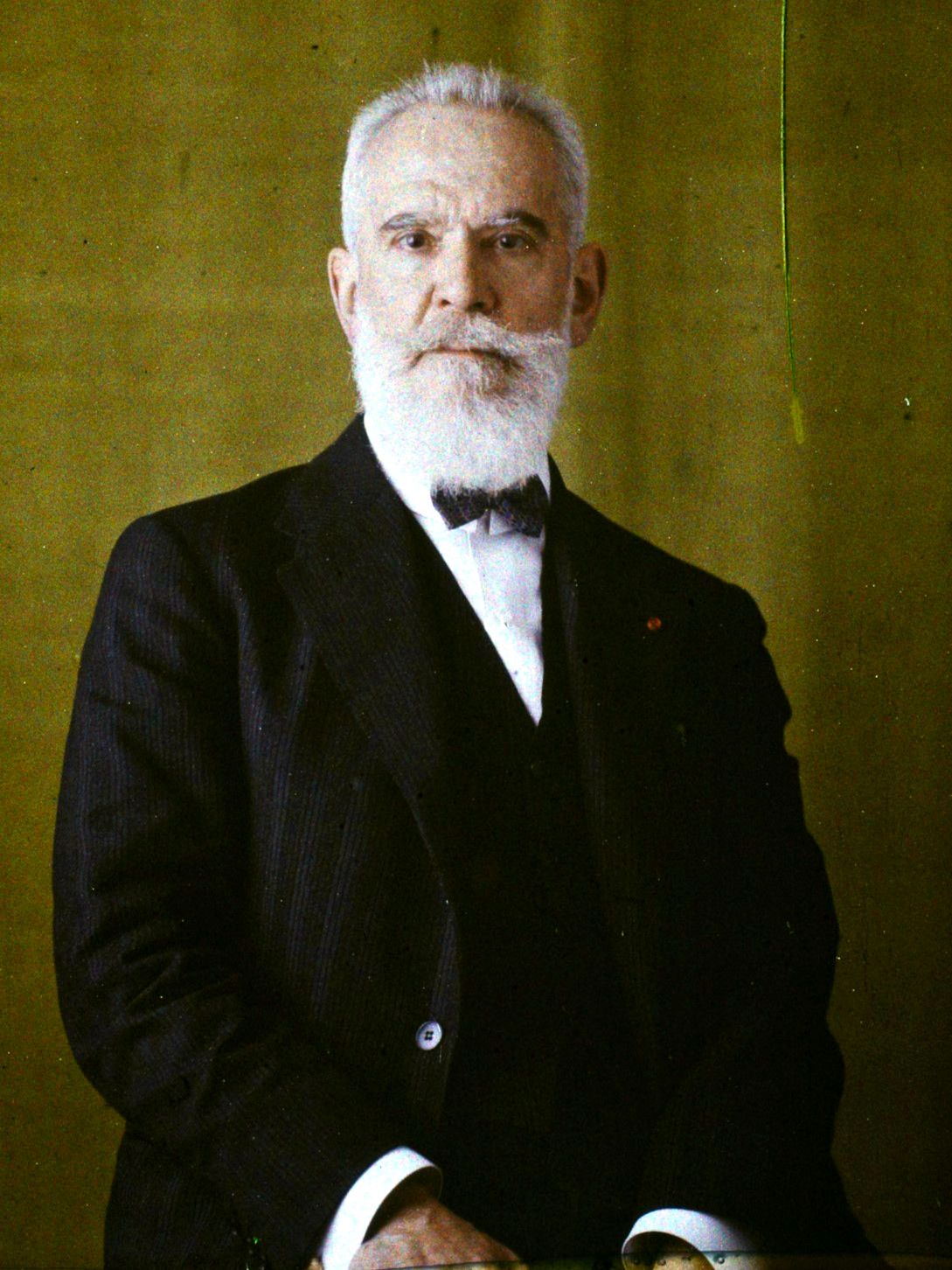
1928 Autochrome by Auguste Léon

Rafael Altamira y Crevea (February 10, 1866 – June 1, 1951) was a Spanish historian and jurist.

Born in Alicante, Altamira is considered to be one of the most significant Spanish historians of the 20th century, was a multi-faceted scholar who also took interest in journalism, pedagogy, politics, and literature. Written as a manual for Spanish history, no other work has pictured the Spanish ethos so graphically as Rafael Altamira's Historia de España y de la Civilización Española (Barcelona, 1899).

In 1898 Altamira, together with other professors of the Law School at the University of Oviedo, established the University Extension as a different area of the university structure. Its main goal was to spread the knowledge created by the universities by means of conferences, courses, and other activities to those social classes that did not have access to it. These professors were following the example set by several English universities that had already been put into practice in other European countries such as Germany and Belgium.

Altamira gave courses and conferences in many universities both in Spain and abroad (Argentina, Peru, USA, France, England, etc.). He was also a justice of The Hague Tribunal, in the Netherlands, where he concentrated his efforts on working for peace and international dialogue. For his work and career he was nominated as candidate for the Nobel Peace Prize in 1933. The same year, he was elected a Foreign Honorary Member of the American Academy of Arts and Sciences.
