= Max Huber (statesman) =

Swiss lawyer and diplomat (1874–1960)

Max Huber

Hans Max Huber (28 December 1874, in Zürich – 1 January 1960, in Zürich) was a Swiss lawyer and diplomat who represented Switzerland at a series of international conferences and institutions.

== Life ==
Max Huber was born in Zurich in 1874 as the son of Peter Emil Huber-Werdmüller, engineer and founder of Maschinenfabrik Oerlikon, and Anna Marie, née Werdmüller (* June 22, 1844; † 5 October 1911). His younger brother was Emil Huber-Stockar.

Max Huber studied law at the universities of Lausanne, Zurich and Berlin from 1894 to 1897, graduating with a doctorate in Berlin in 1897. He then worked for two years as secretary to the board of the Swiss Trade and Industry Association.

After several extensive trips to America, Australia, and India, he was appointed Professor of Constitutional Law, Canon Law and Public International Law at University of Zurich from 1902 to 1914 and retained this title until 1921 but could not teach due to World War I. In 1903, he acquired Wyden Castle in Ossingen, whereupon he was admitted to the Herrenstuben Society in Winterthur as "lord of the castle". From 1914 to 1918, he was a member of the Council of the Canton of Zurich. He was also a permanent legal advisor to the Federal Political Department, the Swiss Foreign Ministry. In this capacity, he represented Switzerland at the Second International Peace Conference in The Hague in 1907 and at the Paris Peace Conference in 1919. He headed the Swiss delegations to various bodies of the League of Nations on several occasions. From 1922 to 1939, he was a member of the Permanent Court of International Justice in The Hague, from 1925 to 1927, he was its President and then Vice-President. He was the youngest member of the Court when he was appointed in 1920.

Due to his experience in matters of international law, after the First World War, he was entrusted with the task of drafting the Statute of the High Commission of the League of Nations for the Repatriation of Prisoners of War. Later, from 1930 to 1933, he also became the first President of the Nansen International Office for Refugees, which was established after the death of High Commissioner Fridtjof Nansen.

From 1915 to 1924, he was a member and, for a time, vice president of the administrative committee of the Neue Zürcher Zeitung. He was also a member of the Boards of Directors of Maschinenfabrik Oerlikon (until 1944 as Chairman), Aluminium-Industrie AG (until 1941 as Chairman) and the Swiss Reinsurance Company. From 1938, Aluminium-Industrie AG (AIAG) benefited from large orders from the armaments industry. While AIAG generated a net profit of twenty-one million francs in 1941, Most workers at the AIAG plant in Chippis, Valais, had to make do with wages below the minimum subsistence level.

Max Huber was married to Emma, née Escher (* 15 September 1883; † 6 November 1957). He was laid to rest in the Enzenbühl cemetery in Zurich.

From 1928 to 1944, he was president of the International Committee of the Red Cross. He also acted as the arbitrator in the influential Island of Palmas Case between the United States and the Netherlands in 1928 at the Permanent Court of Arbitration.

After retiring from the Red Cross and prior to his death, Huber published several articles on international law.

== Selected works ==
- Der Schutz der militärischen und völkerrechtlichen Interessen im schweizerischen Strafgesetzbuch. Verlag Stämpfli & Cie AG, Bern 1913
- Die soziologischen Grundlagen des Völkerrechts. Verlag Dr. Walther Rothschild, Berlin 1928
- Grundlagen nationaler Erneuerung. Vom Wesen und Sinn des schweizerischen Staates. Evangelium und nationale Bewegung. Schulthess, Zürich 1934
- The good samaritan. Reflections on the gospel and work in the Red Cross. Victor Gollancz, London 1945
- Das Internationale Rote Kreuz. Idee und Wirklichkeit. Max Niehans Verlag, Zürich 1951
