= Corfu Channel case =

1947-49 International Court of Justice case on sea law

The Corfu Channel case
- Court: International Court of Justice
- Full case name: Corfu Channel (United Kingdom of Great Britain and Northern Ireland v. People's Republic of Albania)
- Decided: 25 March 1948 (prelim. objection); 9 April 1949 (merits); 15 December 1949 (compensation)

Case history
- Related action: Monetary Gold Removed from Rome in 1943

Court membership
- Judges sitting: José Gustavo Guerrero (Acting President), Jules Basdevant (President), Alejandro Álvarez, Isidro Fabela, Green Hackworth, Bohdan Winiarski, Milovan Zoričić, Charles de Visscher, Sir Arnold McNair, Helge Klæstad, Abdul Badawi Pasha, Sergei Krylov, John Reed, Hsu Mo, Philadelpho Azevedo, Bohuslav Ečer (ad hoc)

Case opinions
- Separate Opinion: Alejandro Álvarez; Dissenting Opinion: Bohdan Winiarski; Dissenting Opinion: Abdul Badawi Pasha; Dissenting Opinion: Sergei Krylov; Dissenting Opinion: Philadelpho Azevedo; Dissenting Opinion: Bohuslav Ečer (ad hoc)

The Corfu Channel case (French: Affaire du Détroit de Corfou) was the first public international law case heard before the International Court of Justice (ICJ) between 1947 and 1949, concerning state responsibility for damages at sea, as well as the doctrine of innocent passage. A contentious case, it was the first of any type heard by the ICJ after its establishment in 1945.

Following a series of encounters from May to November 1946 in the Corfu Channel between the United Kingdom and the People's Republic of Albania—one of which resulted in damage to two Royal Navy ships and significant loss of life—the United Kingdom brought suit in the ICJ seeking reparations. After an initial ruling on jurisdiction in 1948, the ICJ issued separate merits and compensation judgments in 1949. The Court awarded the United Kingdom £843,947. This amount remained unpaid for decades, and British efforts to see it paid led to another ICJ case to resolve competing Albanian and Italian claims to more than two tons of Nazi gold. In 1996, Albania and the United Kingdom settled the judgment along with Albania's outstanding claim to the gold.

Corfu Channel has had a lasting influence on the practice of international law, especially the law of the sea. The concept of innocent passage used by the Court was ultimately adopted in a number of important law of the sea conventions. The stance taken by the Court on use of force has been of importance in subsequent decisions, such as Nicaragua v. United States. Additionally, the case served to set a number of procedural trends followed in subsequent ICJ proceedings.

== Corfu Channel incident ==
Map of narrow portion of the Corfu channel

In 1946, during the Greek Civil War, a series of three encounters took place in the Corfu Channel, between Albania and the United Kingdom.

On 15 May, the cruisers Orion and Superb passed through the northern part of the Corfu Channel. Albanian shore batteries opened fire on the two ships, coming within 200 yards (180 m) of the squadron, but striking neither vessel. The United Kingdom lodged a formal protest, demanding an apology from Albania. Albania stated that the ships had violated Albanian territorial waters, and asserted that passage through the Corfu Channel required Albanian permission. On 2 August, the United Kingdom stated that Royal Navy ships would return any fire in the future.

On 22 October, a Royal Navy flotilla composed of cruisers Mauritius and Leander, and destroyers Saumarez and Volage, entered the Corfu Channel. The ships were at Action Stations, with orders to return fire if they were attacked. Their guns were not loaded, and were in a neutral position—trained fore and aft, rather than aimed at the shore. (Note: While Albania claimed the flotilla was sailing in a combat formation, maintaining an aggressive posture, the ICJ and most sources dismiss this claim.) At 2:53 p.m., Saumarez struck a mine and was heavily damaged; thirty-six people aboard were killed. Volage took her in tow, only to strike another mine at 4:16 p.m.; eight people were killed. A total of forty-four people died and forty-two others were injured, and Saumarez was damaged beyond repair. Shore batteries in the vicinity were observed by the ships, but neither side took any action. At one point, a boat flying an Albanian ensign and a white flag approached Volage to ask what the ships were doing. Writing in 2014, maritime archaeologist James P. Delgado said of the incident:

[The] narrowness of the Corfu Channel and rocky shallows north of the island effectively pushed ships to the edge of Albania's maritime border, occasionally over the line, sometimes to within a mile of shore. Given the Albanian defenses, the tensions prompted by their increasingly anti-Western ruler and a British government eager to reassert a strong naval role in the region, a clash was perhaps inevitable.

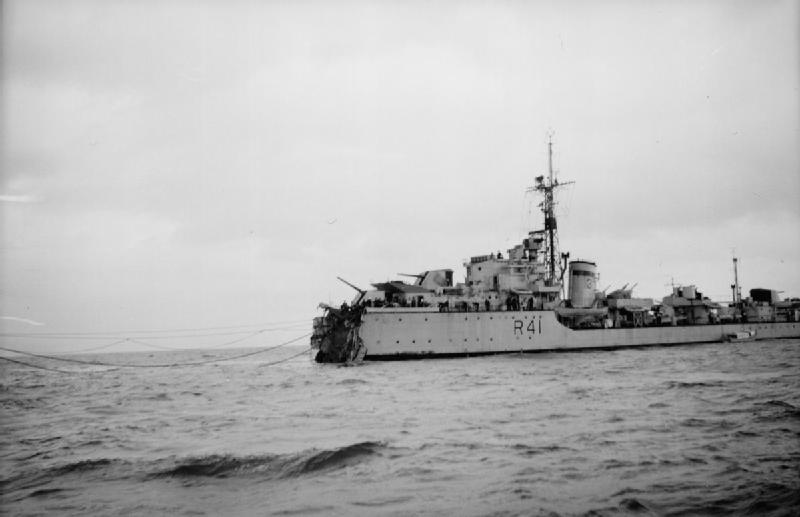
HMS Volage lost her bow as a result of striking a mine in the Corfu Channel while towing HMS Saumarez, which had also struck a mine not long before.

On 12 and 13 November, the Royal Navy undertook a mine clearance operation in the Corfu Channel, Operation Retail, which took place in Albanian territorial waters without advance permission from that country. Subsequently, the Albanian government formally complained to the United Nations, describing the operation as an incursion into Albanian territorial waters.

On 9 December, the United Kingdom demanded reparations from Albania. Albania denied involvement in the laying of mines, blaming Greece. In January 1947, the United Kingdom attempted to involve the United Nations Security Council. The Soviet Union objected, but the Security Council heard the British complaint. A fact-finding committee consisting of Polish, Australian and Colombian representatives reached no conclusions despite ten meetings. A Soviet veto, supported by Poland, blocked a resolution that would have accused Albania of indirect responsibility for the minefield. The Security Council passed a resolution on 9 April 1947, with the Soviet Union and Poland abstaining, recommending that the United Kingdom and Albania resolve the dispute in the International Court of Justice. This recommendation was made pursuant to Article 36, paragraph 3 of the United Nations Charter. On 22 May, the United Kingdom brought suit against Albania. The ICJ, being permanently in session, was available to begin hearing the case immediately. Despite having a long backlog of matters for consideration, such as a request for an advisory opinion on Article 4 of the United Nations Charter, the Corfu Channel case was considered first.

Looking back on this point in the incident in 1966, Leslie Gardiner wrote that one might have expected the incident to be all but resolved by this point. That after the "awkward tussle before the Security Council", the proceedings before the ICJ would be "for a mere formal pronouncement of guilt or innocence, in an atmosphere of judicial calm, undisturbed by political considerations, uncorrupted by nationalistic and ideological threats and sulks".

== Case history ==
The United Kingdom submitted its application to the ICJ on 22 May 1947. The submission was made without any prior negotiation with Albania to reach a special agreement. The jurisdiction of the ICJ over the matter was claimed under Article 36, Paragraph 1 of the ICJ Statute. The United Kingdom was initially represented by then-attorney general Hartley Shawcross, who had been chief prosecutor for the United Kingdom at the Nuremberg trials. Eric Beckett, legal counsel for the Foreign Office, was also a major member of the legal team, while additional support came from Hersch Lauterpacht, Humphrey Waldock, Richard Wilberforce, J. Mervyn Jones and M. E. Reed.

Albania submitted a letter to the Court on 2 July, which partially accepted the Security Council's recommendations. The lead counsel for Albania was Pierre Cot, then a Radical deputy in the French National Assembly. In late July, the president of the Court issued an order setting the deadlines for each party's submission of memorials. While the United Kingdom adhered to this deadline, Albania instead filed an objection to the application.

=== Preliminary objection ===
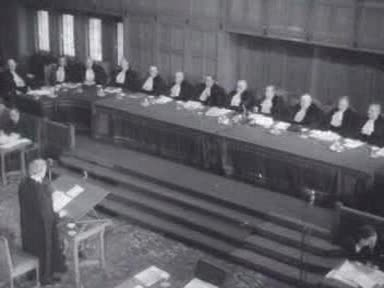
Sir Hartley Shawcross addressing the Court

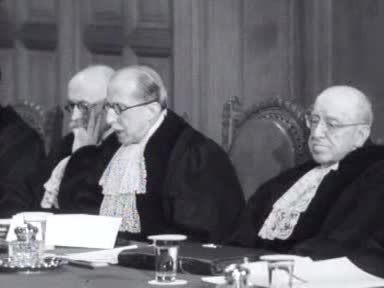
Judge Guerrero speaking from the bench, flanked by two other judges

In the objection filed on 9 December, Albania argued that a special agreement was the only valid way that the case could be brought. The objection stated that when at least one party was a state that was not otherwise bound to submit to the Court's jurisdiction, proceedings could only be instituted by special agreement. Albania cited Articles 26(1) and 40(1) of the ICJ Statute in its support, and stated that no such agreement had been reached. In contesting the claims of the UK, the Albanian objection stated that the Security Council resolution was not itself enough to compel Albania to accept the jurisdiction of the Court. It also said that Albania's acceptance of the obligations of a UN member state did not constitute express acceptance of jurisdiction under the ICJ Statute. After the initial statements, Shawcross was replaced as the representative of the UK by then-solicitor general Frank Soskice.

The ICJ delivered its judgment on the objection on 25 March 1948, voting fifteen-to-one, with Igor Daxner—Albania's designated ad hoc judge—being the sole dissenter. The majority held that Albania had voluntarily submitted to the jurisdiction of the International Court. Specifically, two successive pieces of correspondence were held to have established Albania's informal submission to the Court's jurisdiction: the British transmission of the application to Albania, followed by the Albanian letter to the Court. These documents established jurisdiction ratione personae and ratione materiae. An important factor in this decision was the fact that the Albanian letter had not been produced by Albania's Agent, but by the Deputy Minister of Foreign Affairs. In a separate opinion, while concurring with the majority that Albania had voluntarily submitted to the Court's jurisdiction, Judges Basdevant, Álvarez, Winiarski, Zoričić, de Visscher, Badawi, and Krylov argued that the Security Council's Article 36 recommendation did not place the case within the compulsory jurisdiction of the Court.

Another issue the Court addressed was the difference between the rules governing the institution of proceedings and jurisdiction. Albania's objection assumed that proceedings could only be instituted where compulsory jurisdiction existed or where a special agreement had been reached. In essence, to institute proceedings the party applying to the Court needed only to plead as far as possible the basis of jurisdiction, and not to establish it absolutely.

After the judgement, the parties submitted a special agreement in open court certifying two questions: Whether Albania was responsible for the incidents, and whether the United Kingdom violated Albanian sovereignty. The Court accepted the special agreement as the basis for all further proceedings in the case on 26 March. Additionally, the parties requested that the Court continue the consecutive—as opposed to simultaneous—pleading format. The Court agreed to this.

Following the decay of relations between Albania and Yugoslavia in 1948, the Yugoslavian members of Cot's legal team were replaced by French barristers Joseph Nordmann, Marc Jacquier and Paul Villard. These three were respected members of the French bar and affiliated with the French Communist Party. Nordmann had also been involved in the French prosecution team during the Nuremberg trials.

=== Merits case ===
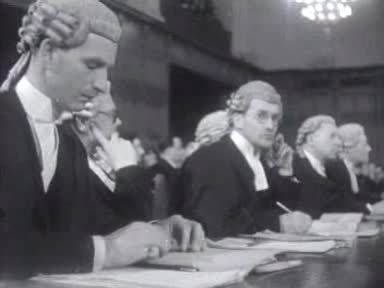
The British legal team

The merits phase began on 9 November 1948. The written pleadings phase has been described as concise by modern standards. The United Kingdom filed some 87 pages of pleadings, while Albania filed 74 pages. The oral proceedings were much more extensive, covering over one thousand pages.

At one point, Yugoslavia desired to submit evidence, but without intervening in the case. This was in response to the British argument that Yugoslavia and Albania had worked together in mining the Corfu Channel, and the presentation of evidence from Karel Kovacic, a former officer of the Yugoslav Navy. On 8 November 1948, Yugoslavia transmitted a communiqué to the Court arguing against Kovacic's credibility and denying any complicity in the mining. Yugoslavia also passed documentary evidence to Albania, which the Agent for Albania filed; while these were not admitted as evidence, an agreement with the United Kingdom permitted them to be used to examine a witness.

An important matter involved a Royal Navy document, referred to as XCU, which comprised the sailing orders issued to the flotilla on 22 October. XCU was a memorandum dated 5 October 1946, and signed by then-Rear Admiral Harold Kinahan. In an admiralty document submitted as part of a United Kingdom memorial to the ICJ, there was a reference to XCU. As a result of this reference, Albania requested the ICJ order the production of XCU, a request which the Court accepted. The ICJ invoked Article 49 of its statute to order production of XCU. According to Anthony Carty, this support for Albania's claim came as a surprise, and Shawcross had not at that point examined the sailing orders. The document posed a problem for him: Shawcross believed it worked against the innocent passage argument. The consensus of the advisers was that XCU might be interpreted as evidence of hostility on part of the UK. The Admiralty argued that the Court should examine the actions of the flotilla on the day in question, rather than, as Carty describes, "the confused and contradictory expressions of the British Administration through such documents as XCU". Citing national security, the Agent for the United Kingdom refused to produce XCU. In its merits judgment, the Court generally accepted the Admiralty's argument, holding that the refusal could not lead to "any conclusions differing from those to which the actual events gave rise". In the decades following the case, XCU and related documents were declassified.

The witness phase took three weeks, during which the United Kingdom called seven witnesses, while Albania called three. (Note: Some witnesses were witnesses of facts, while some were called as both normal and expert witnesses. (Talmon 2012b, p. 1147) & n. 490.) Witness and expert (Note: In this and other ICJ cases, the concept of an expert witness is closer to that used in common law systems than on the European continent. (Talmon 2012b, p. 1146)) examinations generally followed the common law system, with direct examination, cross-examination and redirect examination. This phase of the proceedings was also characterized by flexibility on the part of the Court, with a view to the novelty of the entire situation. On one occasion, the Court allowed recross examination. The Court itself asked questions of some witnesses, almost always between the conclusion of cross-examination and the beginning of redirect examination. On one occasion, the ad hoc judge asked a question of an expert witness between direct and cross-examination; the Court and the parties agreed that the question would instead be submitted in written form to the joint panel of experts. Examinations were primarily conducted in English and French, with interpreters where necessary. During the Albanian cross-examination of Kovacic, the Court had to rule on an objection regarding whether a photostatic copy of a document was admissible as evidence. The Court ruled that the original document needed to be produced, though it confined its ruling to the individual document. A subsequent evidentiary dispute was similarly resolved solely with respect to the disputed documents, without having an effect on precedence. The examination phase was comparatively long, requiring twenty sittings of the Court, compared to fifteen sittings for the two rounds of pleadings.

In a 1948 order, the ICJ called for the assembly of a committee of experts in accordance with Articles 48 and 50 of the ICJ Statute. Such a committee had been assembled just once before, in the Chorzów Factory case, before the Permanent Court of International Justice. This committee consisted of one naval officer each from the Royal Danish Navy, the Royal Norwegian Navy and the Swedish Navy. They were formally appointed by an ICJ order on 17 December. They were accompanied by the Deputy-Registrar of the ICJ, as well as officers of the Royal Navy and the Albanian Naval Force. After the committee submitted its first written report, the ICJ decided to request an on-the-spot enquiry. Yugoslavia also participated in this phase by giving assistance to the committee of experts.

=== Merits judgment ===
In 1949, the ICJ issued its merits judgment, ruling partly in favour of Albania and partly in favour of the United Kingdom. The Court held that the United Kingdom did not violate Albanian territorial waters on 22 October 1946 when the four-ship flotilla transited the parts of the Corfu Channel that were within Albanian territorial waters. The Court's decision was based on its determination that the character of an international strait was determined by its connection of two parts of the high seas, and that the strait was used for international navigation. The burden of proof had rested on the United Kingdom, as it had been the applicant.

On the question of innocent passage, the Court found in favor of the United Kingdom, voting fourteen to two. Notably, the Court held that a right to innocent passage existed during times of peace through straits like the Corfu Channel, which connected two parts of the high seas. The Court accepted that some Albanian regulation of passage through the Channel would have been acceptable, but not to the extent of demanding prior authorization, or of barring the passage of warships outright. This served to clarify the 1930 Hague Conference with respect to international straits. The Chinese legal scholar Jia Bing Bing argued in 1998 that this decision meant that in peacetime, a country could not prohibit the passage of all vessels, or otherwise require authorization. Jia goes on to argue that, because Albania was unable to rapidly distinguish between the passage of Greek and other vessels during times of high political tensions, the requirement of prior notification could be lawful.

With respect to the minefield itself, the Court rejected the British contention that Albania had laid it, stating that such a claim was not credible: at the time, Albania lacked the capacity for such operations. The Court also rejected the Albanian argument that Greece might have been responsible, as well as the claim that the mines had been laid after 22 October, as being nothing more than conjecture. The Court stated that it did not need to determine who had placed the mines: given that they were in Albanian territorial waters, and that the evidence placed the minelaying activity at a recent time, during which Albania was known to have high levels of security. Thus, the Albanian government would have had knowledge of any minelaying operations in the Corfu Channel, and as such, had a responsibility to notify other states of the navigational hazard they presented.

One commentator has noted that the Court's approach to the British claims illustrated how the standard of proof in the ICJ differed for actions versus omissions. The United Kingdom had alleged that Albania had laid the mines, or alternatively, that Albania and Yugoslavia had colluded in laying the mines. It also alleged that Albania's failure to warn ships of the danger of the minefield constituted an omission that affected the rights of other states: specifically, the right of innocent passage. With respect to the claim of Albanian-Yugoslav collusion, the United Kingdom could not provide direct evidence either of collusion or of who had actually laid the mines. For the collusion, the Court demanded "a degree of certainty", while to establish the omission, the Court demanded that there be "no room for reasonable doubt" that Albania had knowledge of the minefield. While the latter standard seems like it should be higher, it was capable of being satisfied by indirect evidence. Another commentator has noted that despite finding that the British sweeping of the Corfu Channel constituted a violation of international law, the Court did not rule that indirect evidence inadmissible. However, this may have been because Albania never challenged the evidence.

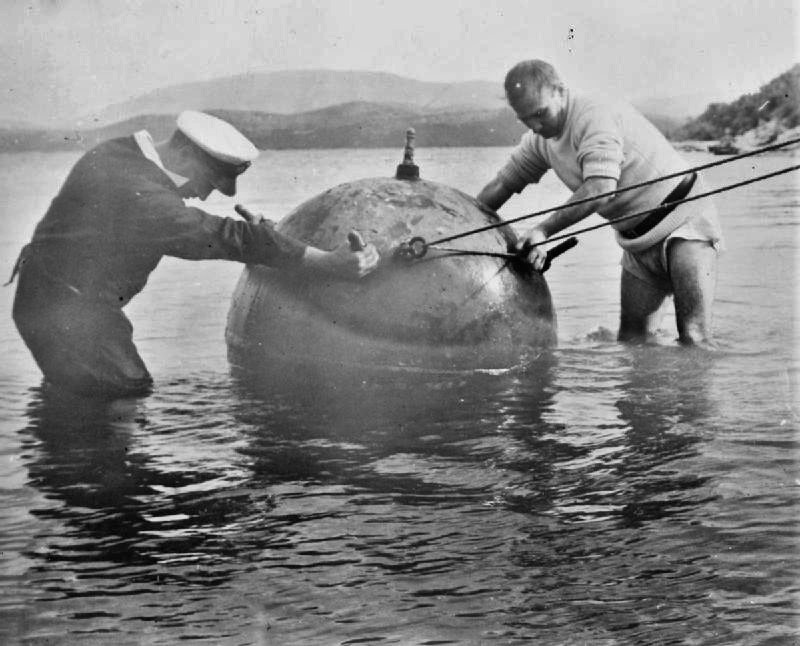
While finding Albania responsible for the mining of the two ships, the Court held that the minesweeping operations in the subsequent Operation Retail violated international law.

In rejecting the British argument that Operation Retail was a justified intervention, the Court famously held that such a right was "the manifestation of a policy of force, such as has, in the past, given rise to most serious abuses and such as cannot, whatever be the present defects in international organization, find a place in international law". The Court also rejected the British arguments that Operation Retail was justified as self-protection or self-help, holding that "respect for territorial sovereignty is an essential foundation of international relations". While the Court found that Albania's conduct in the wake of the mining constituted extenuating circumstances for the United Kingdom, that conduct did not validate Operation Retail.

In a separate opinion, Judge Álvarez argued that warships were not entitled to innocent passage except where such passage was to take part in a UN enforcement action. Judge Krylov's dissenting opinion argued that there was no customary international law allowing passage, and that straits could be regulated by the coastal state. Judge Azevedo also dissented, arguing that territorial seas within international straits were treated the same as any other territorial seas, but that a special regime was needed for international straits.

=== Determining compensation ===
The Court declined to rule on compensation during the merits phase, because Albania had not indicated what portion, if any, of the damages claimed by the United Kingdom it intended to dispute. During the pleadings, the United Kingdom argued that the jurisdiction to award damages was a matter of res judicata—it had already been decided by the ICJ. Article 36, paragraph 6, and Article 60 of the ICJ Statute, taken with the merits judgment, served to grant the ICJ jurisdiction.

Albania did not participate in the written or oral portions of the compensation proceedings, though late in the proceedings requested that a change be made; the Court refused this, holding that Albania had waived the right to make new assertions. Albania's non-participation was because it challenged the ICJ's jurisdiction to award damages. This refusal to participate resulted in the Court applying Article 53 of the ICJ Statute, to appoint experts to evaluate the British claim. The ICJ itself appointed the committee of experts, consisting of two officers of the Royal Netherlands Navy. This committee examined data relevant to the calculations of compensation, which was ultimately annexed to the compensation judgment.

Because Albania did not participate any further in the compensation proceedings, the United Kingdom was awarded judgment by default on 15 December 1949, with the court accepting the argument that the question of its jurisdiction was res judicata under Article 60. Shabtai Rosenne remarked on the ICJ's non-reliance on Article 36, paragraph 6 of the ICJ Statute, noting that this was not explained in its judgment. He argues that the ICJ wanted it clear that its judgment was because Albania defaulted, and because the merits decision was res judicata, not that the matter of whether the ICJ had jurisdiction to award damages at all was res judicata. The Court, furthermore, held that the special agreement gave it the power to determine whether compensation was appropriate, and therefore the power to fix the amount of compensation. Mohammed Bedjaoui notes that this principle was borrowed from the Chorzów Factory.

External image
- Original Corfu Channel (Compensation) judgment, including ICJ wax seal.

The ICJ ordered Albania to pay the UK £843,947 in compensation. This is equivalent to £30.3 million in 2024. Broken down, this represented £700,087 for the loss of the Saumarez, £93,812 for damage to the Volage and £50,048 for the casualties. The award for the Saumarez had been limited by the non ultra petita rule, whereby the Court could not award more than what had been claimed. As of 2012, it was the only case in which the ICJ made an award in the form of liquidated money to a state applicant.

== Fulfillment of the judgment ==
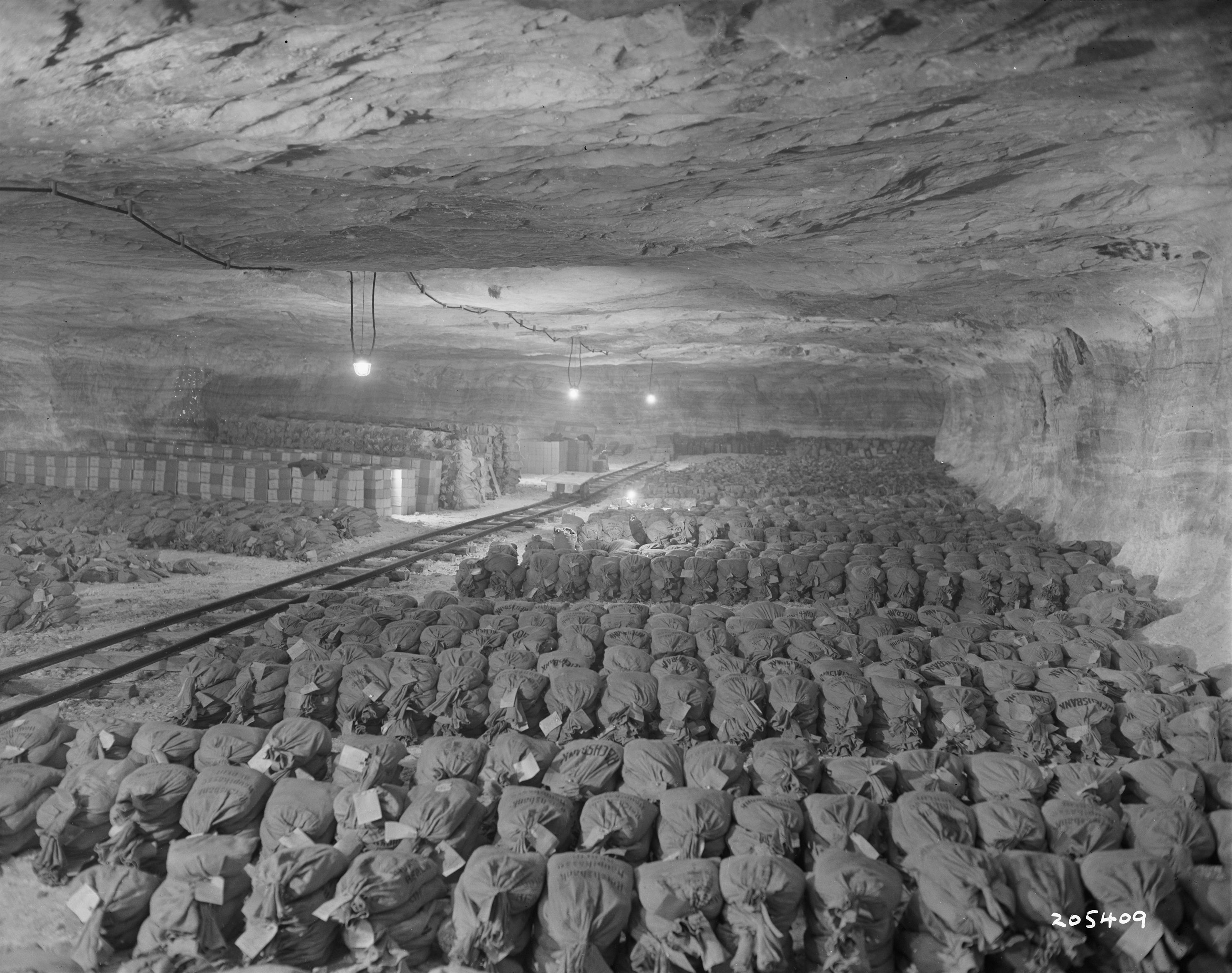
The Tripartite Commission for the Restitution of Monetary Gold was formed to handle the myriad claims stemming from the discovery of Nazi gold. Albania had one such claim.

The judgment against Albania remained unsettled for decades. In negotiations that took place during the summer of 1950, Albania offered £40,000 to settle the claim of the United Kingdom. This is the equivalent of £1.43 million in 2024. In January 1951, the United Kingdom rejected this offer. Settlement talks subsequently broke off. Authorities in the United Kingdom then looked to the possibility of seizing Albanian property in the United Kingdom. This failed because there was no such property under United Kingdom jurisdiction.

The United Kingdom then looked to an Albanian claim for 2,338.7565 kilograms (5,156.075 lb; 75,192.77 ozt) of Nazi gold that had been looted from an Italian vault in 1943. The Tripartite Commission for the Restitution of Monetary Gold, of which the United Kingdom is a member, formed an agreement on 25 April 1951 in Washington, D.C., whereby it requested the President of the ICJ to appoint an arbitrator to resolve the competing claims of Italy and Albania as to the status of the gold. In requesting arbitration, the Tripartite Commission issued the Washington Statement, in which it stated that should the arbitrator grant Albania's claim under Part III of the Final Act of the Paris Conference on Reparations, the gold would be granted to the United Kingdom to partially satisfy the Corfu Channel judgment. On 20 February 1953, the arbitrator granted Albania's claim. This did not end the issue: Italy asserted claims to the gold that were not covered by Part III of the Final Act. These additional claims gave rise to a new ICJ case, Monetary Gold Removed from Rome in 1943, which Italy commenced on 9 May 1953. This case was dismissed on jurisdictional grounds on 15 June 1954, and the gold remained in a vault in London under the Tripartite Commission's name.

Final settlement did not take place until the 1990s, after the end of socialism in Albania. The United Kingdom and Albania reached an agreement on 8 May 1992 whereby the United Kingdom would grant to Albania some 1,574 kilograms (3,470 lb) of Tripartite Commission gold, and Albania would pay $2 million to the United Kingdom. The settlement was finally approved in 1996, after Albania and the other Tripartite powers settled their own claims. At this point, Albania asserted that it was unable to pay the $2 million. Later in 1996, Albania paid the $2 million, and the judgment was considered settled. This is equivalent to $3.68 million in 2024.

== Legacy ==
As the first case heard before the new ICJ, the Corfu Channel case has had a lasting impact on the jurisprudence of the court. From its substantive law of the sea issues and matters of basic procedure, the impact of Corfu Channel is evident in other areas as well. In 2012, Mohammed Bedjaoui wrote of the case:

Armed only with the jurisprudence of its predecessor, this new International Court would successfully establish for the future a whole range of procedural rules, as well as a foundation in a great number of areas, while fortuitously strengthening some legal principles for the good of a world that was about to find itself in a period of strong ideological rivalry. It would even boldly develop international law, notably within the area of environmental protection.

In the same year, another group of authors described Corfu Channel as "a thoroughly modern decision" and "a landmark for international law".

=== Law of the sea ===
The Corfu Channel case has been called a landmark case in the development of the law of the sea. While the 1930 Hague Conference on International Law reached no consensus as to whether the right to innocent passage through territorial seas existed for warships, Corfu Channel heralded a change of this regime.

Corfu Channel was relevant at the seventh session of the International Law Commission (ILC), held in 1955. The ILC ultimately submitted a draft provision to the 1958 United Nations Conference on the Law of the Sea (UNCLOS I), providing that the right of innocent passage through international straits should not be suspended. The ILC attributed their draft to the Corfu Channel merits judgment. The provision was adopted almost verbatim at UNCLOS I into Article 16(4) of the Convention on the Territorial Sea and the Contiguous Zone, but not without significant debate as to how the merits judgment should be interpreted with respect to warships. The convention's provision contained no reference to "warships", but Jia argues that the remainder of Article 16 make it clear that Article 16(4) could not be read to allow the coastal state to require prior authorization, and that otherwise UNCLOS I aligned with the merits judgment.

Innocent passage, along with transit passage, was integrated into the 1982 United Nations Convention on the Law of the Sea (UNCLOS), which superseded the Convention on the Territorial Sea and the Contiguous Zone.

Notably, however, Albania remained "the odd one out" in terms of the law of the sea and maritime cooperation in the Mediterranean. By 1996, Albania had joined very few international conventions regarding the law of the sea and international environmental law. Clive R. Symmons noted that the regime change in Albania had heralded a change in Albania's approach to international law.

=== Use of force ===
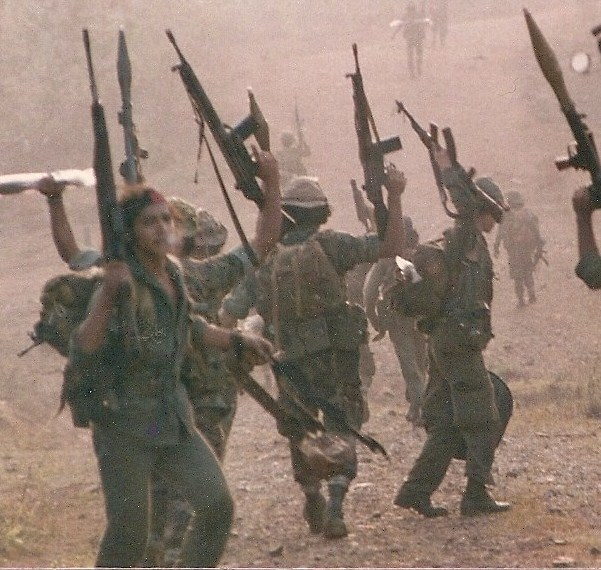
Nicaragua v. United States, which partly dealt with the United States support of Contras in Nicaragua, is another International Court of Justice case involving the use of force.

Before the formation of the United Nations, cases involving the use of force were considered unsuitable for adjudication. Since Corfu Channel, the Court had rendered merits judgments in three use of force cases: Nicaragua v. United States in 1986, the Oil Platforms case in 2003, and Armed Activities on the Territory of the Congo in 2005. Many others have been brought before the Court, though these others did not result in decisions. Historically, the ICJ's stance has been to strictly enforce the prohibition on the use of force, a stance which has proved controversial.

In deciding Albania's claim that the United Kingdom violated Albanian sovereignty with Operation Retail, the Court rejected the British argument that its activities in Albanian territorial waters were justified as necessary to obtain evidence of the minefield in the Corfu Channel, as well as that it was justified as self-help or self-protection. Some controversy surrounded the majority decision, which did not specifically reference the UN Charter's prohibition on the use of force, but simply held that the United Kingdom violated the sovereignty of Albania. In subsequent cases involving use of force, Christine Gray has noted that the Court has similarly avoided specifically referencing the UN Charter in its final pronouncements.

The Court has subsequently held that the UN Charter prohibition on the use of force constituted customary international law. In the Nicaragua case, the parties were in agreement that the prohibition constituted a peremptory norm, or jus cogens. The practices of states have generally conformed to the Court's approach in the Corfu Channel case. The United States has criticized the Court's approach to the use of force. The United States' criticism flows from the fact that, even owing to the use of force against Al-Qaeda in Afghanistan, and the acceptance of the legality of such action, the ICJ still maintains the position that non-state groups cannot commit an "armed attack". An occurrence of an "armed attack" is the necessary condition for a state to use the right of self -defence in response to an illegal use of force, and thus breach the territorial sovereignty of a state.

As to the law of war, or jus in bello, the Corfu Channel case merits decision made reference to the concept, but only when the Court judged the Nicaragua case the ICJ give a significant treatment to the topic. The Permanent Court of International Justice had never dealt with jus in bello. In both cases, the ICJ dealt with situations involving force, but which did not rise to the level of a formal state of war.

=== International environmental law ===
Although Corfu Channel was superficially a decision about the law of the sea and the use of force, scholars such as Malgosia Fitzmaurice have remarked on the impact of Corfu Channel on the development of international environmental law. Specifically, the case, along with the 1930s arbitration from the Trail Smelter dispute and the subsequent ICJ case involving Barcelona Traction, articulated basic principles used extensively in subsequent cases and conventions dealing with the environment. In the Corfu Channel case, the Court articulated the principle that every state is obliged not to knowingly allow its territory to be used to commit acts against the rights of any other state. This meant, with respect to the Corfu Channel, that Albania was obliged to warn others that its territorial waters were mined. The specific language came from the Trail Smelter case, and ultimately was adopted into the Stockholm Declaration and Rio Declaration.

=== Procedural legacy ===
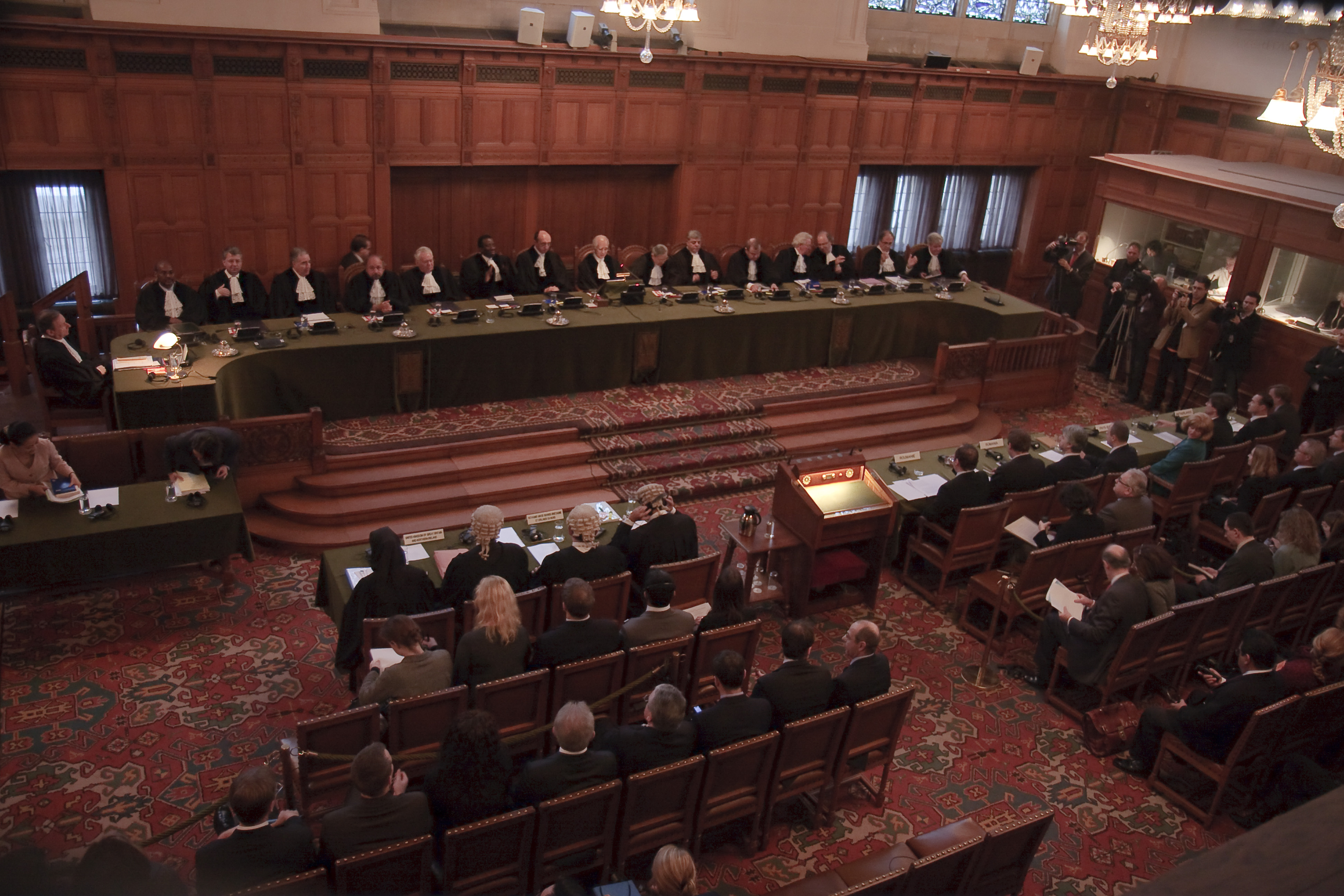
Corfu Channel has impacted the procedure of the International Court of Justice in subsequent cases.

According to Aristotles Constantinides, one of the major reasons the Corfu Channel case has continued to be of importance in current public international law has to do with the standards it established in the evidentiary and fact-finding portions of the case. For instance, Corfu Channel differed from other cases in the Permanent Court in that witnesses, both expert and non-expert, were available during the oral proceedings for cross-examination, as well as for questioning by the judges. Shabtai Rosenne comments that because the British "took the initiative to call witnesses", it was the British procedure for witness examination that the Court adopted in that case, and which has been roughly followed in all subsequent contentious cases. The use of circumstantial evidence also derives from Corfu Channel. According to Christian Tams, the academic consensus is that the Court successfully resolved the evidentiary issues before it.

Corfu Channel also started a trend in the ICJ where states appointing judges ad hoc would not choose one of their own nationals to fill the role. This subsequently happened in the Aerial Incident of 27 July 1955 and Arbitral Award of the King of Spain cases, among others. In the 1978 Rules of Court, Article 35 paragraph 1 was intentionally drawn up to encourage this practice. It was also the beginning of a trend where the ICJ's final decisions occasionally consisted of more than one judgment.

Corfu Channel has been an outlier in terms of how the case reached the ICJ. The UN Charter, Article 36(3), provides that the Security Council may recommend cases for settlement by the Court. Corfu Channel has been the only time the Security Council has openly relied on that authority (via Resolution 22). Christian Tomuschat has argued that Resolution 395, issued with respect to the Aegean dispute, and which resulted in the Aegean Sea Continental Shelf case, is a veiled invocation of that same power. In two other situations, the Security Council has considered making an Article 36(3) recommendation, only to have it defeated by vote or veto. Additionally, Corfu Channel is unusual in that the expert testimony was considered in the judgment.

Some procedural issues decided in Corfu Channel have been subsequently superseded. At that point, the rule with respect to experts providing testimony to the Court required that the party calling the expert should pay their expenses. This has since been supplanted by Article 68 of the Rules of the ICJ, which provides that the Court's own funds pay for experts. Corfu Channel also carried over the PCIJ practice of asking the parties' consent prior to resuming proceedings with a judge who had been temporarily absent; this practice was eliminated in 1953. The case was also the first and final instance where the PCIJ practice of reading separate opinions aloud before the court was followed. The practice of publicly reading decisions was eliminated after the case.

== See also ==
- List of International Court of Justice cases
- United Nations Security Council Resolution 19
- 1985 Polar Sea controversy, a subsequent controversy involving the Northwest Passage
