= Albania–United Kingdom relations =

- Albania: United Kingdom

Diplomatic mission
- Embassy of Albania London: Embassy of Britain Tirana

Albania–United Kingdom relations are the bilateral relations between Albania and the United Kingdom. Albania and the United Kingdom established diplomatic relations on 8 November 1921.

Both countries share common membership of the Council of Europe, European Court of Human Rights, the International Criminal Court, NATO, OSCE, and the World Trade Organization. Bilaterally the two countries have a Double Taxation Agreement, an Investment Agreement, a Partnership, Trade and Cooperation Agreement, a Readmission Agreement, and an Agreement on the Transfer of Sentenced Persons.

== History ==
=== National Awakening era ===
Aubrey Herbert was a British soldier, diplomat, traveller, and intelligence officer. He was very active fighting for the cause of Albanian independence and is regarded as having considerable influence on Albania's success at obtaining eventual independence in the resulting Treaty of London (1913). He was twice offered the throne of Albania by the Albanian People.

=== Principality era ===
During the Albanian–Yugoslav border war of 1921, Great Britain's prime minister Lloyd George had recognized the Albanian government and also made multiple heated diplomatic protests against the Yugoslav government, demanding its withdrawal from disputed areas. Due to Britain's intervention and the possibilities of sanctions against their country, Yugoslavia ended support for The Mirdita Rebels and withdrew its troops from all Albanian territories.

=== Zogist era ===
Diplomatic relations were established first in 1922. The first minister, Sir Henry Eyres, presented his credentials in January 1922. Eyres was succeeded by his successor, Sir Robert Hodgson in 1928 who served until 1936. Relations were interrupted in 1939 after the Italian invasion of Albania.

The United Kingdom supplied the Royal Albanian Army.

=== Relations with the People's Republic of Albania ===
The Corfu Channel incident between ships of the Royal Navy and the Albanian Naval Force took place in the Channel of Corfu in 1946 as an early episode of the Cold War and in Anglo-Albanian relations. During first incident, Royal Navy ships came under fire from Albanian fortifications passing through the Straits of Corfu. The incident caused Albania to complain to the United Nations, leading to the Corfu Channel case, where the United Kingdom brought a case against the People's Republic of Albania to the International Court of Justice. The Court rendered a verdict under which Albania was to pay £844,000 to the United Kingdom.

As a result of the British broke off talks with Albania aimed at restoring diplomatic relations between the two countries. In 1981, the British Government of Margaret Thatcher proposed to the Albanian Government the restoration of diplomatic relations without preconditions on the matter of reparations, but the Albanian communist authorities did not accept it. The offer remained open and the United Kingdom continued to engage in unconditional talks. In March 1985, in Paris, talks were held on the return of Albanian gold, but they were interrupted by the death of First Secretary Enver Hoxha that month and were not resumed.

Diplomatic relations were only restored on 29 May 1991.

=== Post-1992 ===
On 8 May 1992, Britain and Albania came to an agreement over the Corfu Channel case, announcing that "Both sides expressed their regret at the Corfu Channel Incident of 22 October 1946" and Albania agreed to pay US$2,000,000 in reparations.

=== Anglo-Albanian Association ===
The Anglo-Albanian Association was founded to support the Albanian cause in Great Britain and to promote recognition of the Independent Albania. Some of the members were Edith Durham, Lord Lamington and Dervish Duma. After 1985 the Chairman of the Anglo-Albanian Association was Harry Hodgkinson, British writer, journalist, and naval intelligence officer. Its current president is Noel Malcolm. The Association also has a website Website of the Anglo-Albanian Association.

==== Cooperation ====
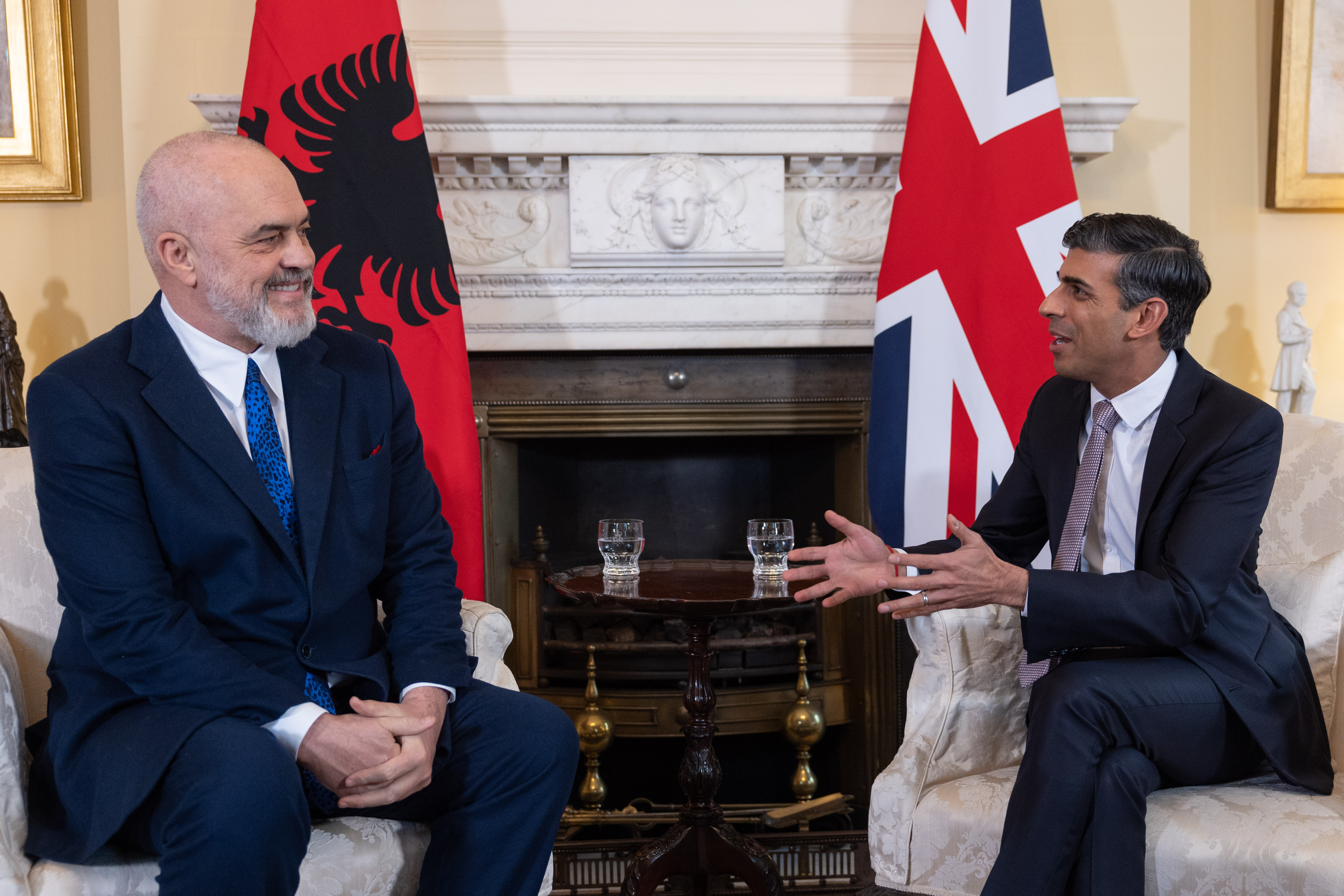
Prime Minister Sunak in a meeting with Albanian Prime Minister Edi Rama in 2023

The militaries of Albania and the United Kingdom have cooperated on numerous occasions, including military exercises in 2013 and 2014. The 2013 Albanian Lion exercise involved nearly 1,000 Royal Marines and HMS Bulwark. The 2014 Albanian Lion exercise saw 600 Royal Marines visit Albania.

In 2016, around 1,500 military personnel from the United Kingdom joined Albanian forces for Exercise Albanian Lion.

== Economic relations ==
From 1 April 2009 until 30 December 2020, trade between Albania and the UK was governed by the Albania–European Union Stabilisation and Association Process, while the United Kingdom was a member of the European Union.

Following the withdrawal of the United Kingdom from the European Union, the UK and Albania signed the Albania–UK Partnership, Trade and Cooperation Agreement on 5 February 2021. The Partnership, Trade and Cooperation Agreement is a continuity trade agreement, based on the EU free trade agreement, which entered into force on 1 January 2021. Trade value between Albania and the United Kingdom was worth £293 million in 2022.

== High level visits ==
Guest	Host	Place of visit	Date of visit
(Albania) Foreign Minister Lulzim Basha	(United Kingdom) Foreign Secretary David Miliband	London	12 February 2008
(United Kingdom) Foreign Secretary Philip Hammond	(Albania) Prime Minister Edi Rama	Tirana	18 November 2015
(Albania) Prime Minister Edi Rama	(United Kingdom) Prime Minister Rishi Sunak	London	23 March 2023
(Albania) Prime Minister Edi Rama	(United Kingdom) Prime Minister Rishi Sunak	London	5 October 2023
(United Kingdom) Foreign Secretary David Cameron	(Albania) Prime Minister Edi Rama	Tirana	22 May 2024
(United Kingdom) Prime Minister Keir Starmer	(Albania) Prime Minister Edi Rama	Tirana	15 May 2025

== Agreements ==
Dates	Agreement
30 March 1994	Agreement for the Promotion and Protection of Investments, Co-operation in the Field of Tourism, Air Services and Education, Science and Culture
14 October 2003	Agreement on the Readmission of Persons, with Protocol
26 March 2013	Agreement on the Transfer of Sentenced Persons and for the Avoidance of Double Taxation and the Prevention of Fiscal Evasion with respect to Taxes on Income and on Capital
5 February 2021	Partnership, Trade and Cooperation Agreement signed to tackle organised crime and to prevent it from spreading in Europe.

== See also ==
- Foreign relations of Albania
- Foreign relations of the United Kingdom
- Albanians in the United Kingdom
- Corfu Channel case
- List of ambassadors of Albania to the United Kingdom
