= Monetary Gold Removed from Rome in 1943 case =

Monetary Gold
- Court: International Court of Justice
- Full case name: Monetary Gold Removed from Rome in 1943 (Italy v. France, United Kingdom and United States)
- Decided: June 15, 1954

Italy v France, United Kingdom and United States (also called the Monetary Gold Removed from Rome in 1943 case) was a case decided by the International Court of Justice (ICJ) in 1954, and part of a long-running dispute over the fate of Nazi gold that was originally seized from Rome. The ICJ held that it had no jurisdiction to adjudicate the case.

== Facts ==
On 17 September 1943, 2,338 kg of gold was seized by the Germans from Rome. After the war, both Italy and Albania claimed that this gold was theirs, and that the Tripartite Commission for the Restitution of Monetary Gold should return it to them. On 17 November 1950, the commission informed their forming governments (France, the UK and United States) that they could not resolve the issue. On 25 April 1951, the three governments, having failed to reach an agreement, agreed to request that the International Court of Justice appoint an independent arbitrator, who, on 20 February 1953, decided that the gold belonged to Albania.

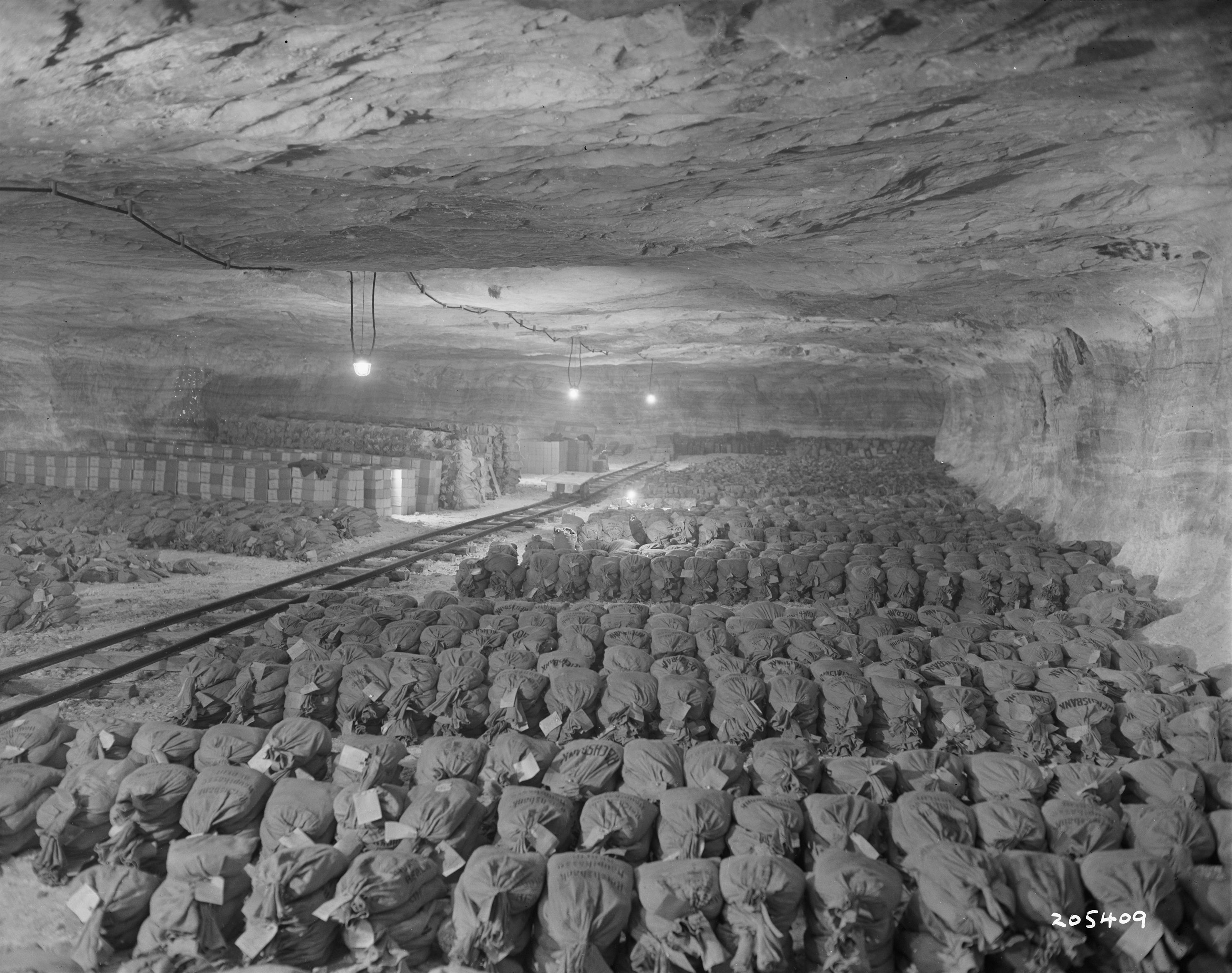
The "Tripartite Commission for the Restitution of Monetary Gold" was formed to handle the myriad claims stemming from the discovery of Nazi gold. Albania had one such claim. (Nazi gold stored in Merkers Salt Mine)

However, the UK and Italy still laid claim to the gold: the UK as partial payment towards the (still unsettled) compensation that Albania was ordered to pay them against damage to UK navy vessels and loss of life during the Corfu Channel Incident, caused by an undisclosed Albanian mine-field in Corfu (see the Corfu Channel Case), whilst Italy claimed that most of the gold was originally Italian, seized by the Albanian government when it took control of the National Bank of Albania (which Italy had the majority of shares in), and additionally that the Italian Peace Treaty specifically gave them claim to the gold.

On 19 May 1953, Italy requested that the ICJ determine how much of the gold Italy had claim to, and whether the UK's or the Italian's claim should take precedence, stating that the three countries responsible for the redistribution of the gold should give it all to Italy in partial compensation for the Albanian seizure of the National Bank of Albania, and that this claim should over-ride the UK's claim.

== Judgment ==
On 15 June 1954, the ICJ decided that, as the first issue to be addressed was the resolution of the legal dispute between Italy and Albania over the seizure of the National Bank of Albania, and as Albania had not deferred to the ICJ in this case, the ICJ had no jurisdiction in this matter.

== See also ==
- List of International Court of Justice cases
