= Canadian Internal Waters =

Part of Canadian territorial waters

In Canadian law, Canadian Internal Waters are the waters "on the landward side of the baselines of the territorial sea of Canada".

== Definition ==
The baselines are defined as "the low-water line along the coast or on a low-tide elevation that is situated wholly or partly at a distance not exceeding the breadth of the territorial sea of Canada from the mainland or an island," and the territorial sea is defined as extending 12 nautical miles (22 km) from the points of the baselines, or such other points as may be prescribed.

Canada asserts that all waters within the bounds of the Canadian Arctic Archipelago, including Hudson Bay and the Northwest Passage, are within its internal waters. They also include the Strait of Juan de Fuca, the Strait of Georgia, Queen Charlotte Sound and Hecate Strait, the Gulf of Saint Lawrence and the Bay of Fundy.

Canada insists that its internal waters are delimited in accordance with the rules laid out in the United Nations Convention on the Law of the Sea.

== Dispute ==
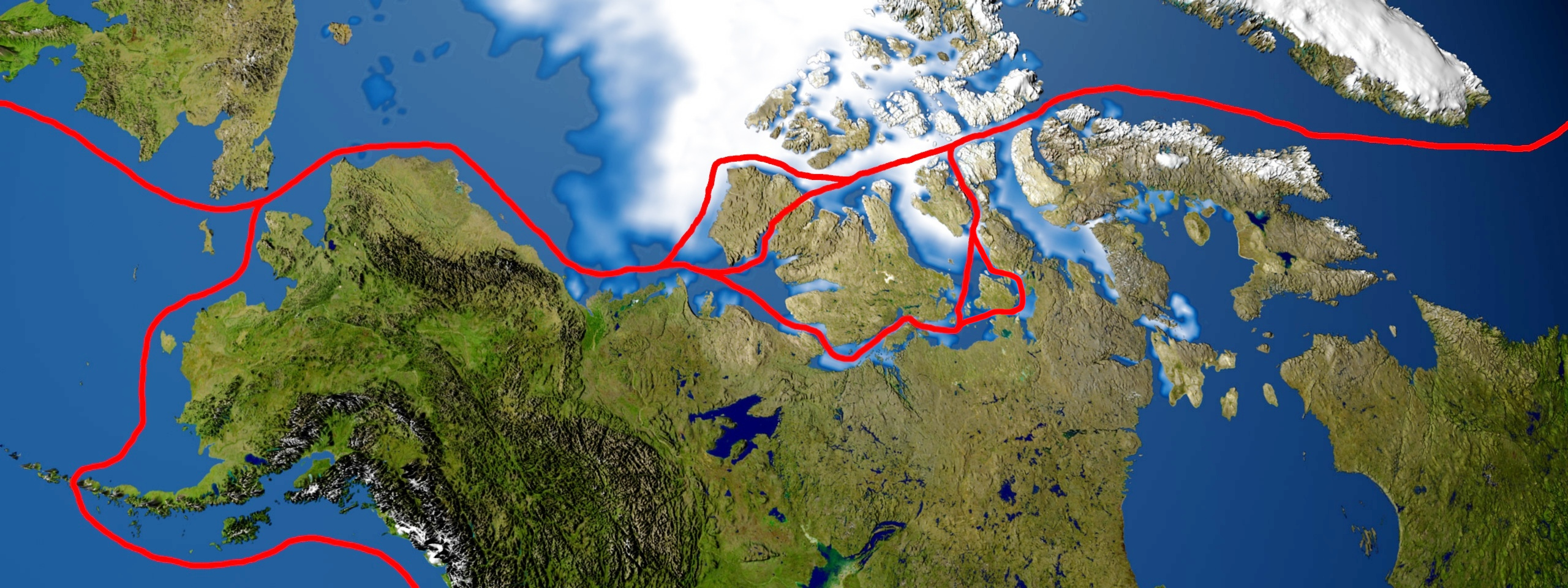
Northwest Passage routes

The legal status of a section of the Northwest Passage is disputed: Canada considers it to be part of its internal waters, fully under Canadian jurisdiction according to the United Nations Convention on the Law of the Sea. However, the United States has not accepted the international convention. The US and most maritime nations consider the area to be an international strait, which means that foreign vessels have the right of "transit passage". For an international strait, Canada would have the right to enact fishing and environmental regulation, fiscal and smuggling laws, and laws intended for the safety of shipping, but not the right to close the passage.
