= United Nations Security Council Resolution 19 =

United Nations Security Council resolution

UN Security Council Resolution 19
- Flag of Albania
- Date: February 27 1947
- Meeting no.: 114
- Code: S/RES/19 (Document)
- Subject: The Corfu Channel incidents
- Voting summary: 8 voted for; None voted against; 3 abstained
- Result: Adopted

Security Council composition
- Permanent members: China; France; Soviet Union; United Kingdom; United States
- Non-permanent members: Australia; Belgium; Brazil; Colombia; Poland; Syria

United Nations Security Council Resolution 19 was adopted on 27 February 1947. The Council created a sub-committee to investigate the Corfu Channel incident and the dispute between Albania and the United Kingdom.

Resolution 19 passed with eight votes to none. Poland, the Soviet Union, and Syria abstained.

== See also ==
- Corfu Channel case
- Albania and the United Nations
- United Kingdom and the United Nations
- United Nations Security Council Resolution 22
