= Coastal state =

Nation that borders the sea

A coastal state is a term found in the law of the sea. Although widely used in the legal documents, including the UN Convention on the Law of the Sea (UNCLOS), this term lacks a precise definition. The "essential idea" of a coastal state is having an open sea coast and asserting the sovereignty or jurisdiction in the areas of the sea adjacent to this coast. Norway, Canada, and Chile are examples of the coastal states, Churchill counts up a total of 150 of such states (while considering the definition in the Virginia Commentary, "the State from the coastline or baselines of which the breadth of the territorial sea is measured" to be "overly narrow"). A littoral state is a coastal state whose land territory is adjacent to a particular maritime area (as in littoral states of the Persian Gulf).

The interests of a coastal state can be in conflict with those of the maritime nations (the ones that greatly depend on the sea trade routes). For example, when the marine pollution is concerned, the coastal states seek to protect their shores and waters, while the maritime nations worry about limits the protective regulations place onto the freedom of navigation. Many states have both maritime and coastal interests, so the groups of coastal and maritime states intersect to a large degree.

The coastal states have jurisdiction over the sea areas: internal waters and the territorial sea with international straits (limited by the transit passage), archipelagic waters, the contiguous zone, the exclusive economic zone and the continental shelf. Their jurisdiction covers, depending on the area: navigation, fishing, mineral extraction from the seabed, customs, fiscal, research (including archeological) and immigration matters, the environmental protection. Jurisdiction also extends to ships and overflying aircraft, including those on board of them, structures built in the sea and their population.

Børresen, while acknowledging that UNCLOS uses the term for any state with territorial sea, suggests limiting its scope by excluding the states with the navies of global reach, "maritime powers".

== Sources ==
- Aldawish, Abdulmalik Mohammed A. (2025). The Application of the Transit Passage Regime in Straits Used for International Navigation: A Study of the Strait of Hormuz (PhD thesis). University of Essex.
- Churchill, Robin (2015-01-01). "11 Under-Utilized Coastal State Jurisdiction: Causes and Consequences". Jurisdiction over Ships. Brill Nijhoff. pp. 278–298. doi:10.1163/9789004303508_012. ISBN 978-90-04-30350-8.
- Børresen, Jacob (1994). "The seapower of the coastal state". Journal of Strategic Studies. 17 (1). Informa UK Limited: 148–175. doi:10.1080/01402399408437544. ISSN 0140-2390.
- Jin, Alan Tan Khee (1997). "The Regulation of Vessel-Source Marine Pollution: Reconciling the Maritime and Coastal State Interests". Singapore Journal of International & Comparative Law. 1 (1): 355–381.
