= Co-operative Mechanism =

Co-operative Mechanism on Safety of Navigation and Environmental Protection in the Straits of Malacca and Singapore
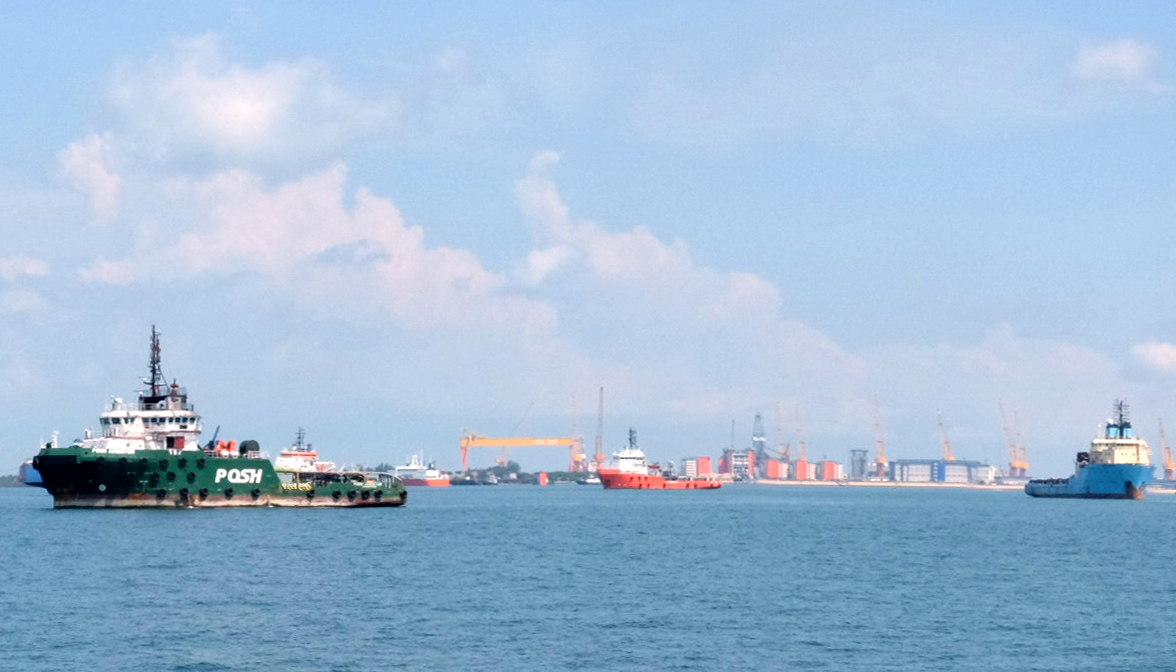
- Ships in the Straits of Malacca and Singapore
- Signed: 18 September 2007
- Location: Singapore
- Signatories: Indonesia; Malaysia; Singapore
- Language: English

The Co-operative Mechanism on Safety of Navigation and Environmental Protection in the Straits of Malacca and Singapore, known simply as the Co-operative Mechanism, is an international cooperative framework launched in September 2007 to facilitate cooperation between the littoral States of Indonesia, Malaysia and Singapore, user States and industry stakeholders on navigational safety and environmental protection in the Straits of Malacca and Singapore (SOMS).

The establishment of the Co-operative Mechanism was the first instance of Article 43 of the 1982 United Nations Convention on the Law of the Sea (UNCLOS) being implemented by states bordering straits used for international navigation .

The Co-operative Mechanism was built on existing cooperative arrangements between the littoral states such as the Tripartite Technical Experts Group (TTEG), which remains as the primary forum for the littoral states to discuss technical issues related to the navigational safety and marine environmental protection in the SOMS.

The Co-operative Mechanism comprises three complementary components: the Co-operation Forum, Project Co-ordination Committee (PCC) and Aids to Navigation Fund (ANF).

== Background ==
The Co-operative Mechanism was launched as a platform for Indonesia, Malaysia and Singapore to jointly respond to challenges related to navigational safety and marine environment protection in the Straits of Malacca and Singapore, considered to be "the world's busiest waterway", with the support of user States and industry stakeholders.

Providing the shortest distance between the Indian and Pacific Oceans, the Straits of Malacca and Singapore have been a sea trade route for ships for centuries. The Strait is approximately 900 km long and 2.7 km wide at its narrowest point. It has been regarded as challenging to navigate for seafarers, due to its constrained, congested and environmentally dynamic conditions. As such, the Strait of Malacca and Singapore and its users are particularly vulnerable to incidents occurring along the narrow waterway. This has been raised as a concern that gave rise to the formation of regional frameworks such as the Co-operative Mechanism to support safety of navigation through improving navigational aids and conducting joint hydrographic surveys.

Several oil spill accidents in the 1960s and 1970s heightened concerns about the navigational challenges in the Strait, most notably the Showa Maru incident. On 6 January 1975, the Japanese supertanker ran aground in the western part of the Singapore Strait, spilling 4,500 tons of oil and incurring significant damages. The incident remains the most serious oil spill incident in Singapore to date, and ramped up serious discussions on greater cooperation between littoral states to address navigational safety and marine environment challenges.

In 1975, the Tripartitie Technical Expert Group (TTEG) was established for decision-making and coordinating projects in the Straits.

In January 1976, the littoral states reached an agreement to introduce a Traffic Separation Scheme and implement an Under Keel Clearance limit.

By 1998, Vessel Traffic Service Centres in Malaysia and Singapore were established and the Mandatory Ship Reporting System in the Straits of Malacca and Singapore (STRAITREP) was introduced. With strengthened cooperation among the littoral states, IMO and Japan, more than thirty aids to navigation (AtoNs) were procured and upgraded. As of 2026, 51 aids to navigation are managed by the littoral states.

After UNCLOS entered into force in 1994, the littoral states sought to expand stakeholder involvement in the Straits of Malacca and Singapore beyond the TTEG. This was to decrease the load of burden-sharing among the littoral states, with regular financing of AtoN maintenance and improvement works serving as an example. Discussions among the littoral states to establish a formal cooperative arrangement to address issues on safety of navigation and the marine environment began, but faced challenges that delayed the Co-operative Mechanism's establishment. Geopolitical developments such as the 1997 Asian Financial Crisis and the subsequent political crisis in Indonesia, followed by the 2003–2004 SARS outbreak, prevented significant progress. Following the September 11 attacks, maritime security concerns were heightened and the United States launched the Proliferation Security Initiative (PSI). Additionally, a sharp increase in piracy and armed robbery incidents led to the Strait being declared as a "war-risk zone". These developments, along with the potential withdraw of financial support from Japan, necessitated greater cooperative efforts among littoral states on issues in the Straits of Malacca and Singapore, with a focus on prioritising littoral states.

In 2004, the International Maritime Organization (IMO) launched the Protection of Vital Shipping Lanes Initiative, a policy framework to bring attention to strategic maritime corridors, in particular Straits Used for International Navigation such as the Straits of Malacca and Singapore. This initiative focused specifically on enhancing navigational safety and marine environment protection, and aimed at raising international awareness towards the importance of safeguarding maritime trade routes, against the backdrop of global security concerns at the time.

The Co-operative Mechanism was formally launched at the International Maritime Organization (IMO) - Singapore Meeting in September 2007, following a series of IMO-sponsored meetings in Jakarta, Kuala Lumpur and Singapore. The Co-operative Mechanism was considered a "historic breakthrough" by then-president of the Third UN Conference on the Law of the Sea, Singapore ambassador-at-large Tommy Koh, as it implemented Article 43 of UNCLOS for the first time in any part of the world. The article reads:

Article 43: Navigational and safety aids and other improvements and the prevention, reduction and control of pollution

User States and States bordering a strait should by agreement cooperate:

(a) in the establishment and maintenance in a strait of necessary navigational and safety aids or other improvements in aid of international navigation; and

(b) for the prevention, reduction and control of pollution from ships

== Structure of the Co-operative Mechanism ==
The Co-operative Mechanism consists of three pillars — the Cooperation Forum, Project Coordination Committee (PCC) and Aids to Navigation Fund (ANF).

The Cooperation Forum promotes dialogue and exchange of views on issues of common interests in the Straits of Malacca and Singapore. It serves as the main avenue for user States, the shipping industry and other stakeholders to be invited to meet and engage in discussion with the littoral states. At the Forum, presentations on topics such as initiatives to enhance navigational safety, marine environment protection and information-sharing on new developments in the maritime industry facilitate constructive discussion and capacity-building.

The Project Coordination Committee oversees the coordination of implementation of projects that have been jointly approved by the TTEG. Straits Projects are identified from topics presented at the Cooperation Forum and prioritised for safety of navigation and marine environment protection. As of 2026, the PCC has overseen 15 Straits Projects.

The Aids to Navigation Fund receives voluntary financial contributions that provide for the maintenance and renewal of the 51 critical aids to navigation in the Straits.
