= United Nations Security Council Resolution 22 =

United Nations Security Council resolution

UN Security Council Resolution 22
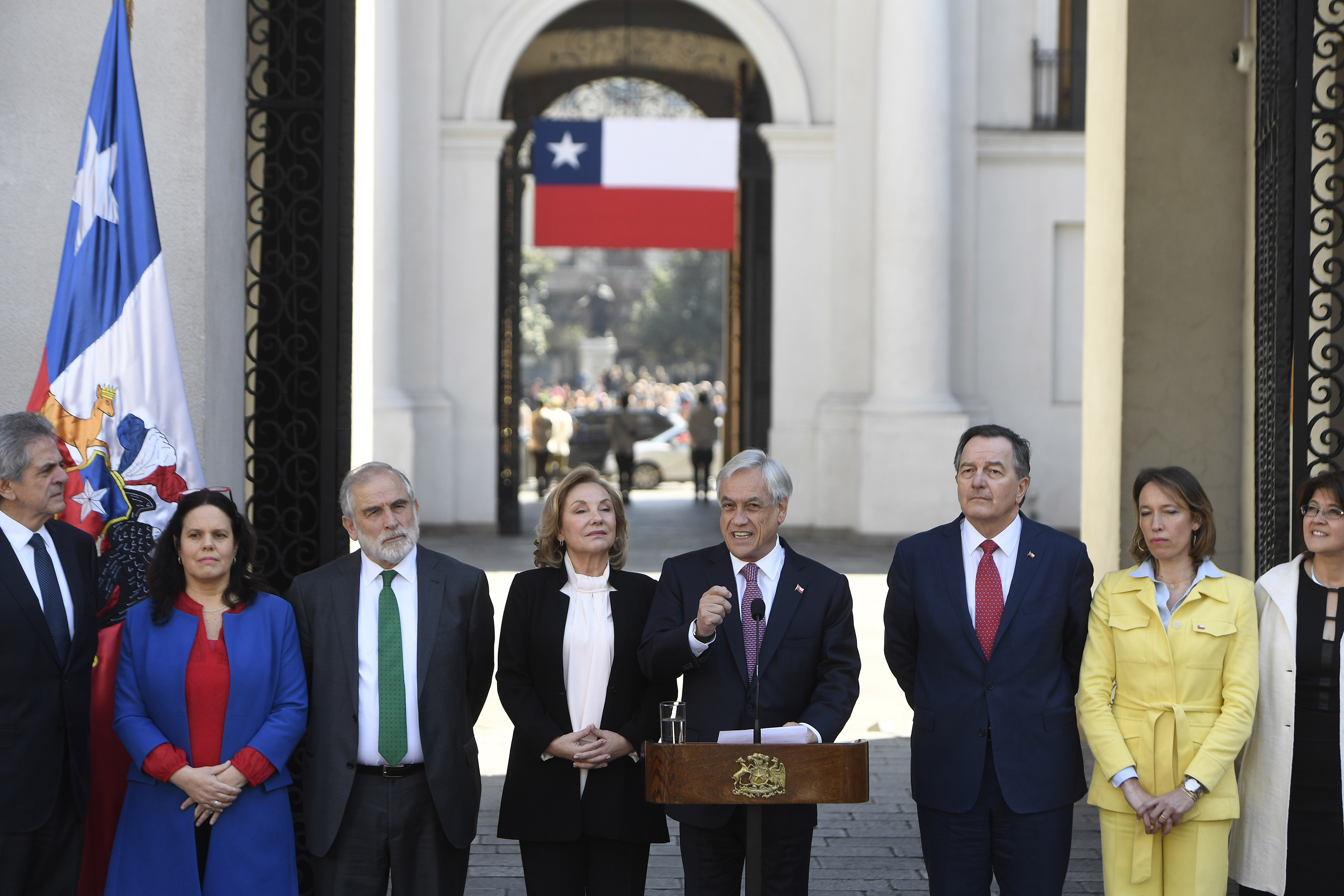
- International Court of Justice
- Date: April 9 1947
- Meeting no.: 127
- Code: S/324 (Document)
- Subject: The Corfu Channel incidents
- Voting summary: 8 voted for; None voted against; 2 abstained; 1 present not voting
- Result: Adopted

Security Council composition
- Permanent members: China; France; Soviet Union; United Kingdom; United States
- Non-permanent members: Australia; Belgium; Brazil; Colombia; Poland; Syria

United Nations Security Council Resolution 22 was adopted on 9 April 1947. The Council recommended that Albania and the United Kingdom take their dispute over the Corfu Channel incident to the International Court of Justice.

Resolution 22 passed with eight votes to none. Poland and the Soviet Union abstained. The United Kingdom did not participate. On May 22, the United Kingdom brought the dispute to the ICJ, resulting in the Corfu Channel case.

== See also ==
- Corfu Channel case
- Albania and the United Nations
- United Kingdom and the United Nations
- United Nations Security Council Resolution 19
