= Innocent passage =

Concept in the Law of the Sea

Innocent passage is a concept in the law of the sea that allows for a vessel to pass through the territorial sea (and certain grandfathered internal waters) of another state, subject to certain restrictions.

Innocent passage applies to the entire territorial sea, up to at most 12 nautical miles (22 km; 14 mi) from coastal baseline. Transit passage is a similar right that applies only to straits that divide two areas of international waters; it has different requirements for transiting vessels. Freedom of navigation is a general right enjoyed in international waters; "freedom of navigation operations" enforces this right, in some cases to counter a claim by a sovereign state that certain waters are territorial.

== Definition ==
The United Nations Convention on the Law of the Sea Article 19 defines innocent passage as:

1. Passage is innocent so long as it is not prejudicial to the peace, good order or security of the coastal State. Such passage shall take place in conformity with this Convention and with other rules of international law.
2. Passage of a foreign ship shall be considered to be prejudicial to the peace, good order or security of the coastal State if in the territorial sea it engages in any of the following activities:
  (a) any threat or use of force against the sovereignty, territorial integrity or political independence of the coastal State, or in any other manner in violation of the principles of international law embodied in the Charter of the United Nations;
  (b) any exercise or practice with weapons of any kind;
  (c) any act aimed at collecting information to the prejudice of the defence or security of the coastal State;
  (d) any act of propaganda aimed at affecting the defence or security of the coastal State;
  (e) the launching, landing or taking on board of any aircraft;
  (f) the launching, landing or taking on board of any military device;
  (g) the loading or unloading of any commodity, currency or person contrary to the customs, fiscal, immigration or sanitary laws and regulations of the coastal State;
  (h) any act of wilful and serious pollution contrary to this Convention;
  (I) any fishing activities;
  (j) the carrying out of research or survey activities;
  (k) any act aimed at interfering with any systems of communication or any other facilities or installations of the coastal State;
  (l) any other activity not having a direct bearing on passage.

Underwater vehicles like submarines are required by the treaty to surface and show their flags during innocent passage.

== History ==
Initially, the right of innocent passage in the current sense began to take shape in the 1840s (as a customary rule) with the development of world trade and the emergence of steamship navigation, for which it was economically significant to use the shortest possible route often through the coastal waters of a foreign state. The law was codified in the 1958 Convention on the Territorial Sea and the Contiguous Zone and affirmed in the 1982 UNCLOS.

== Suspension ==
The coastal state may temporarily suspend the innocent passage of foreign ships if "such suspension is essential for the protection of its security". The suspension must be applied without discrimination between foreign ships. Suspension is however not permitted in international straits.

== See also ==
- 1986 Black Sea incident
- 1988 Black Sea bumping incident
- 1994 Yellow Sea incident
- Corfu Channel incident
- Gulf of Tonkin incident

== Sources ==
- Oral, Nilufer (2019). "Navigating the Oceans: Old and New Challenges for the Law of the Sea for Straits Used for International Navigation". Ecology Law Quarterly. 46 (1). [University of California, Berkeley, University of California, Berkeley, School of Law]: 163–190. ISSN 0046-1121. JSTOR 26853549.
