= Archipelagic state =

Island country that consists of one or more archipelagos

An archipelagic state is a state that rules an island country consisting of one or more archipelagos. The designation is legally defined by the United Nations Convention on the Law of the Sea of 1982 (UNCLOS III). The Bahamas, Fiji, Indonesia, Papua New Guinea, and the Philippines are the five original sovereign states that obtained approval in the UNCLOS signed in Montego Bay, Jamaica, on 10 December 1982 and qualified as archipelagic states.

An archipelagic state can designate the waters between the islands as sovereign archipelagic waters.

As of 20 June 2015, a total of 22 sovereign states have sought to claim archipelagic status. Some island countries comprise one or more archipelagos in a geographical sense, but do not qualify for this status because their land-to-water ratios fall outside the UNCLOS limits, or chose not to claim the archipelagic state status, including Cuba, Iceland, Japan, Malta, New Zealand, and the United Kingdom.

== Archipelagic waters ==
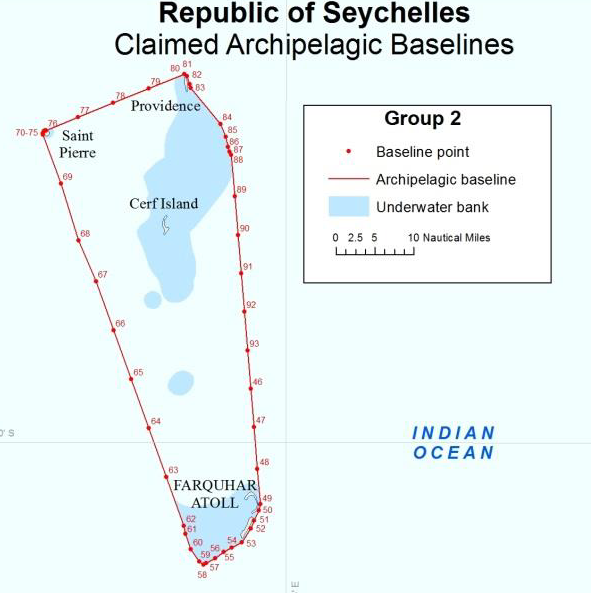
An example of archipelagic waters claim using underwater features as "land" (Seychelles "Group 2")

Archipelagic states are composed of groups of islands that form a state as a single unit, the islands and the waters within the baselines as internal waters (archipelagic waters). Under this concept ("archipelagic doctrine"), an archipelago is regarded as a single unit, so that the waters around, between, and connecting the islands of the archipelago, irrespective of their breadth and dimensions, are subject to its exclusive sovereignty (while allowing ships from other countries to exercise the archipelagic sea lanes passage or innocent passage at their choice). The baselines must enclose the main islands of the archipelago, and the enclosed water to land ratio must be "between 1:1 and 9:1". The lower end of this ratio was chosen to exclude states with a lot of land, like Japan, while the higher end prevents a group of highly scattered islands from putting claims on a very large body of water. The ratio was proposed during UNCLOS negotiations by The Bahamas in order to include all five original archipelagic states. Low-tide elevations can be used for baselines, provided that they have lighthouses built on them, or lie within the territorial water of an actual island.

The exact status of archipelagic waters is subject to interpretation. For example, both the Philippines and Indonesia consider their archipelagic waters to be more sovereign than the territorial waters and closer to the internal waters.

The approval of the United Nations (UN) for the five sovereign states as archipelagic states respects existing agreements with other countries and recognizes traditional fishing rights and other legitimate activities of the immediately adjacent neighboring countries in certain areas falling within archipelagic waters. Regulation of these rights and activities may occur by bilateral agreements, if requested by any of the countries concerned, but not transferred to or shared with third countries or their nationals.

=== Archipelagic sea lanes passage ===
The regime of archipelagic sea lanes passage (ASLP) is specific to archipelagic waters and is similar to the transit passage for the international straits: both ships and aircraft can use the archipelagic waters, the right of passage is non-suspensible, submarines can navigate while submerged, etc. Article 54 in particular explicitly incorporates Articles 39, 30, 42, and 44 (that cover the transit passage) into ASLP. The main difference between the transit passage and ASLP is that in case of ASLP the ship can opt instead for an innocent passage, while the transit passage provides no such alternative. Both transit passage and ASLP regimes, with the ability to launch and receive aircraft, perform maneuvers and navigate underwater, are primarily designed for warships.An archipelagic state can designate sea lanes and air routes that will be subject of ASLP and "include all normal routes used [...] for international navigation or overflight". If the state does not do so, the default sea lanes will correspond to "the routes normally used for international navigation". Ships should not deviate more than 25 miles off the designated lanes.

== History ==
Discussions about the status of waters between the islands of an archipelago date back to 1924, when Alejandro Alvarez proposed grouping the islands together when considering the limits of territorial waters. The concept of an archipelagic state became a matter of consideration when the potential beneficiaries (Bahamas, Fiji, Indonesia, Philippines) gained independence after World War II. In the absence of international law, the claims of these states to the waters between the islands were based on internal laws (Indonesia) or interpretation of treaties (the 1898 Treaty of Paris for the Philippines). At the same time, the economic activity involving the sea resources grew in importance, prompting, for example, the 1945 Truman Proclamation by the United States, 1955 and 1956 notes verbales of the Philippines, and the 1957 Djuanda Declaration by Indonesia.

After an early attempt to define archipelagic waters as territorial waters by the League of Nations at the 1930 Hague Conference on Codification failed, the efforts restarted in 1952 with the International Law Commission (ILC) proposing a definition of an archipelago as three or more islands in the mid-ocean separated by no more than 10 miles, with the body of water in between being internal waters. The proposal was objected to by the maritime states. The 1958 UNCLOS I established the rule of straight baselines that settled the issue for the islands of mainland countries, but not for the mid-ocean archipelagoes. UNCLOS III finally settled the issue prompted by a proposal submitted by Fiji, Indonesia, Mauritius, and the Philippines. The codification comprises nine articles of the Part IV of the UNCLOS.

== List of archipelagic states ==
This is a list of aspiring and current archipelagic states in the world. 22 island countries have submitted claims or sought archipelagic status by the provisions of the 1982 United Nations Convention on the Law of the Sea.

Bolded are the five official (accepted) archipelagic states.

State	Geographical configuration	Geological type	Area (km^{2})	Population		Geographical location
State	Geographical configuration	Geological type	Area (km^{2})	total	per km^{2}	Geographical location
Antigua and Barbuda	One archipelago with two main islands	Oceanic	440	97,118	194	Caribbean Sea; Leeward Islands
**Bahamas**	One archipelago	Oceanic	13,878	392,000	23.27	North Atlantic Ocean; Lucayan Archipelago
Cape Verde	One archipelago	Oceanic	4,033	518,467	125.5	North Atlantic Ocean; Macaronesia
Comoros	One archipelago	Oceanic	2,235	784,745	275	Indian Ocean; Comoro Islands
Dominican Republic	One archipelago with its main island (Hispaniola) shared with another country (Haiti)	Continental	48,442	10,652,000	208.2	Caribbean Sea; Greater Antilles
**Fiji**	One archipelago with two main islands	Various (Note: Viti Levu is continental while some small offshore islands are oceanic.)	18,274	859,178	46.4	South Pacific Ocean; Melanesia
Grenada (Note: Including Carriacou and Petite Martinique.)	One archipelago with two main islands	Oceanic	344	110,000	319.8	Caribbean Sea; Windward Islands
**Indonesia**	One archipelago with several islands; four of them (Borneo, Sebatik, New Guinea, and Timor) shared with four other countries: Brunei, Malaysia, Papua New Guinea, and Timor-Leste. World's largest archipelagic state.	Various (Note: The geology of Indonesia is very complex, as the country is located at a meeting point of several tectonic plates. Indonesia is located between two continental plates: Australian Plate (Sahul Shelf) and the Eurasian Plate (Sunda Shelf); and between two oceanic plates: the Pacific Plate and the Philippine Sea Plate.)	1,904,569	270,203,917	124.7	World Ocean; Maritime Southeast Asia
Jamaica	One archipelago with one main island	Oceanic	10,991	2,847,232	252	Caribbean Sea; Greater Antilles
Kiribati	Three archipelagos	Oceanic	811	123,346	152	Pacific Ocean; Micronesia
Maldives	One archipelago	Oceanic	298	329,198	1,105	Indian Ocean; Maldive Islands
Marshall Islands	Two archipelagos	Oceanic	181	62,000	342.5	North Pacific Ocean; Micronesia
Mauritius	Two archipelagos with two main islands	Oceanic	2,040	1,244,663	610	Indian Ocean; Mascarene Islands
**Papua New Guinea**	One archipelago with its main island (New Guinea) shared with another country (Indonesia)	Continental shelf	462,840	6,732,000	14.5	South Pacific Ocean; Melanesia
**Philippines**	One archipelago	Continental shelf	300,000	101,398,120	295	North Pacific Ocean; Maritime Southeast Asia
Saint Vincent and the Grenadines	One archipelago with one main island	Continental shelf	389	120,000	307	Caribbean Sea; Windward Islands
São Tomé and Príncipe	One archipelago with two main islands	Continental shelf	1,001	163,000	169.1	Atlantic Ocean; Cameroon Line
Seychelles	Four archipelagos	Oceanic	455	87,500	192	Indian Ocean; Seychelles Islands
Solomon Islands	Five archipelagos	Oceanic	28,400	523,000	18.1	South Pacific Ocean; Melanesia
Trinidad and Tobago	One archipelago with two main islands	Continental shelf	5,131	1,299,953	254.4	Caribbean Sea; Lesser Antilles
Tuvalu	One archipelago	Oceanic	26	12,373	475.88	South Pacific Ocean; Polynesia
Vanuatu	One archipelago	Oceanic	12,190	243,304	19.7	South Pacific Ocean; Melanesia

== See also ==
- List of archipelagos
- List of island countries
- Lists of islands
- Thalassocracy
