= Bohuslav Ečer =

Czech legal scholar (1893–1954)

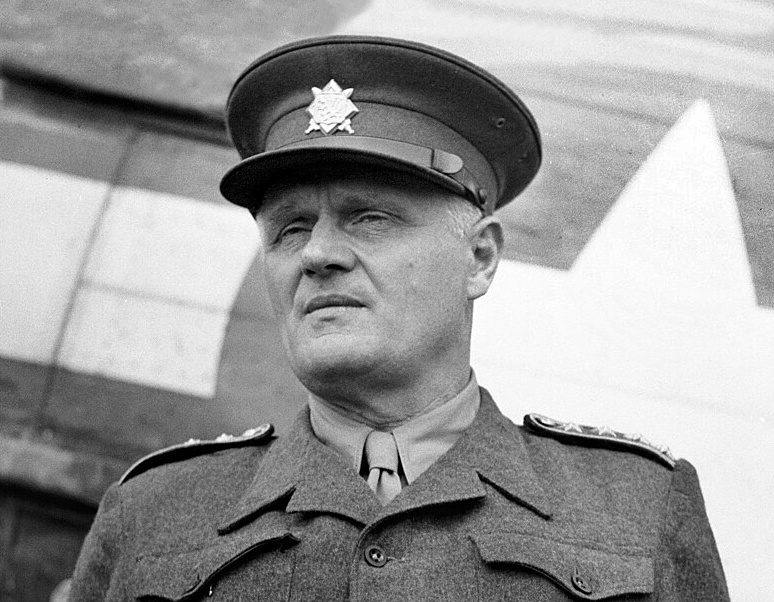
- Born: 31 July 1893; Hranice, Austria-Hungary
- Died: 14 March 1954 (aged 60); Brno, Czechoslovakia
- Education: University of Vienna; University of Charles in Prague
- Occupations: Member of the United Nations Commission for the Investigation of War Crimes; Judge of the International Criminal Court in The Hague; Professor of International Criminal Law at Masaryk University
- Political party: ČSDSD, KSČ (Leninists), KSČ
- Spouse(s): Ludmila Ečerová (née Galleová, 1894–1986)
- Children: Naděžda Lorková (née Ečerová, 1922–1978); Jarmila Laubeová (née Ečerová, 1926-1978)

Bohuslav Ečer (31 July 1893 – 14 March 1954) was a Czechoslovak general of the judicial service and professor of international criminal law. He was also a member of the United Nations Commission for the Investigation of War Crimes, chairman of the Czechoslovak delegation to the International Military Tribunal for the Punishment of War Criminals in Nuremberg and an ad hoc judge of the International Court of Justice in The Hague.

== Life ==
=== Before the occupation ===
Ečer was born on 31 July 1893. He was born into a family of a merchant, later a railway worker. He graduated in 1911 from the classical gymnasium in Kroměříž, then he enrolled at the law faculty of University of Vienna, but he did not graduate because he had to enlist in the army in 1915. After the war, he completed his legal studies at Charles University in Prague, where he received his Doctorate of Law in 1920, and for a short time was a trainee at the district court in Kroměříž, and later at the territorial court in Brno.

Eventually, however, he established his own law practice specializing in criminal law in Brno, where he also married Ludmila Galleová in 1922. The couple eventually had two daughters, Naděžda (born 1922) and Jarmila (born 1926). He published his first work, Guilt and Morality, which is devoted to the trial of Hilda Haniková, who hired a murderer to kill her own husband. He had already joined the Social Democracy in Kroměříž before World War I. After its split in 1921, he joined the Communist Party of Czechoslovakia, for which he was elected to the Brno city council. However, he disagreed with the gradual Bolshevization of the party and its subservience to the Soviet leadership, for which he was expelled from the party in 1929. He first worked in the Communist opposition, then returned to the Social Democrats, for whom he became second deputy mayor of Brno in 1935.

Ečer actively opposed the rising German Nazism, which he recognized as a major danger for the future, and became, for example, a member of the Committee for the Relief of Democratic Spain. In 1938, he publicly agitated for Czechoslovakia's readiness to defend itself against the threat of Nazi Germany, and lectured and persuaded public officials in England, which brought him to the attention of the Gestapo.

=== After the occupation ===
After the occupation of the rest of Czechoslovakia, he emigrated with his family via Zagreb and Belgrade to Paris, where he participated in the Czechoslovak National Committee. There he also wrote a thesis The Occupation of Bohemia and Moravia and the Establishment of the "Protectorate" in the Light of International Law, which, however, was not published due to the German attack. After the fall of France, they went to Marseille, where the Czechoslovak consulate was still functioning, but they were deemed undesirable by the Vichist government and so they moved to Nice, where the Institute for the Study of International Law was moved from Paris. However, as the city was threatened with occupation by Fascist Italy, they fled to the UK in 1942 via Spain and Portugal. Here Bohuslav Ečer became an employee of the Foreign Office Czechoslovak Government in Exile, and later was an associate of the Minister of Justice Jaroslav Stránský.

Ečer had long been involved in issues of international criminal law, war law and war crimes, hence his membership of the London International Assembly's War Crimes Commission, He also wrote the booklet The Lessons of the Kharkov Trial. He was delegated by the government-in-exile as Czechoslovakia's representative to the United Nations War Crimes Commission, where he eventually successfully pushed for the declaration of United Nations as an international crime.

=== Role in the Nuremberg Trials ===
He played a significant role in the establishment of the International Military Tribunal for the punishment of war criminals, which sat in Nuremberg after the war and in which Bohuslav Ečer participated as chairman of the Czechoslovak delegation. Prior to that, he was the head of the Czechoslovak investigative team that found Karl Hermann Frank in Wiesbaden. Ečer was the first to interrogate him, and as a general of the judicial service, he also retrieved him from American captivity into the hands of Czechoslovak justice. He told him at the outset, "I have not used and will not use your methods. You need not be afraid of them. We are not Germans, we do not take revenge. We will only punish."

In addition to him, he also interviewed e.g. Reich Protector Kurt Daluege, Reich Foreign Minister Joachim von Ribbentrop, Field Marshal Wilhelm Keitel, SS General Bernhard Voss and Reich Minister and Reich Chancellery Chief Hans Lammers. After the Nuremberg Trials, he served as a judge of the International Court of Justice in The Hague, where he ruled in the so-called "Corfu Strait Incident" between Great Britain and Albania, dissenting from the majority decision on Albania's responsibility. He described his experiences throughout this period in the popular books The Nuremberg Trial, How I Prosecuted Them, Law in the Struggle with Nazism and Lessons from the Nuremberg Trial for the Slavs.

=== Post-war years ===
In 1948, he became first associate professor and then professor of international criminal law at the Faculty of Law of Masaryk University in Brno, where he headed the Institute for International Criminal Law and published the script Handbook of Public International Law. He also published a scientific monograph Development and Foundations of International Criminal Law. However, he did not stay there for long, as the faculty was closed down in 1950. Although Bohuslav Ečer remained in the university, he could not teach or publish. As a former social democrat who had taken part in the war resistance in the West and who, among other things, had defended Milada Horáková, he gradually became a target of StB. However, when they came to arrest him in 1954, as he was to be one of the defendants in the upcoming mock trial of the so-called Brno Group, he was already a day dead. He died a quick death from a heart attack of the left posterior chamber of his heart. His wife Ludmila escaped persecution by hiding in a psychiatric hospital, but his daughter Jarmila was sentenced to 12 years and released after Amnesty in 1960.

== Awards ==
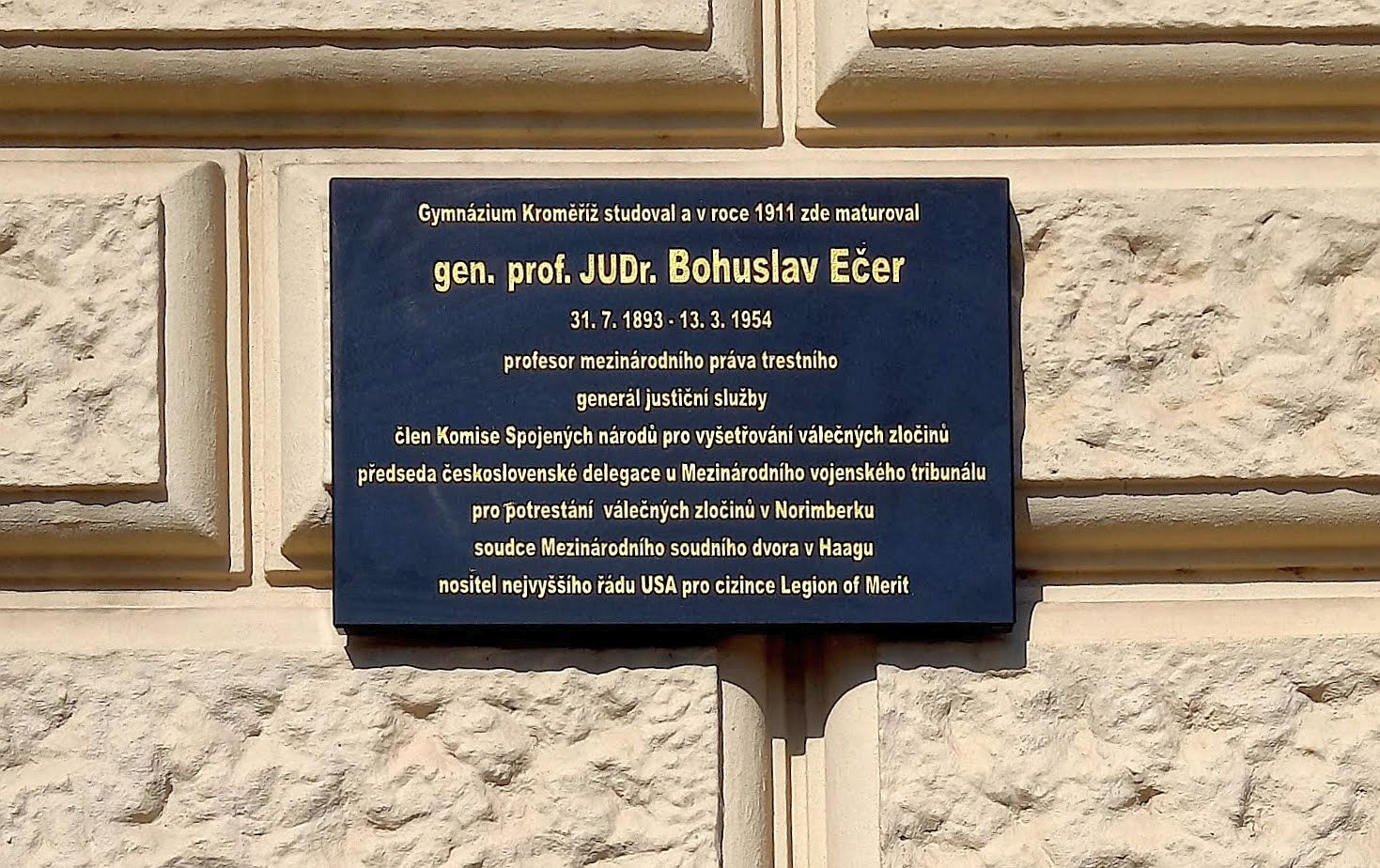
Memorial plaque on the building of the Kroměříž Gymnasium

In 2001, Bohuslav Ečer was awarded the in memoriam honorary citizenship of the city of Brno and in Brno-Bystrc a street named after him, Ečerova Street.

In 2012, he was awarded the Václav Benda Prize (in memoriam). In 2019, President Miloš Zeman conferred on him in memoriam the Order of the White Lion of the Military Group, First Class.

On 1 October 2021, a memorial plaque was unveiled on the gymnasium building in Kroměříž.
