= International strait =

Concept in maritime law

An international strait is a narrow natural waterway connecting two parts of the high seas or exclusive economic zones, used for international navigation. Per the United Nations Convention on the Law of the Sea (UNCLOS), a transit passage regime prevails in such straits for both ships and aircraft with few exceptions, even when the territorial waters of bordering country or countries overlap. Worldwide, more than 200 straits might satisfy the criteria of an international strait. Notable international straits include the Bosporus and Dardanelles, Strait of Magellan, Strait of Gibraltar, Strait of Dover, Danish Straits and the Strait of Hormuz.

== Terminology ==
The term is defined in articles 37 and 38 of the UNCLOS III. The convention does not use the words "international strait" to prevent a confusion with international waters, describing instead the straits used for international navigation.

Some experts suggest a broader definition of the "international strait". In particular, the following list is proposed:

1. straits used for international navigation with their transit passage regime;
2. geographic straits where a high seas corridor remains. The territorial waters part of such strait is governed by the innocent passage regime;
3. straits governed by long-standing conventions, namely the Danish Straits, the Sea of Åland, the Turkish Straits, the Straits of Tiran, the Strait of Magellan and the Beagle Channel. Sailing through these straits is governed by the respective conventions;
4. straits where high seas alternatives are of "similar convenience", typically due to the coastal state choosing to keep 3-mile territorial waters thus preserving the high seas regime at the centerline of the strait. In this case only innocent passage is possible in the territorial waters;
5. straits formed by islands are governed by a non-suspendable innocent passage regime;
6. archipelagic straits with archipelagic sea lanes passage regime;
7. dead end straits with innocent passage regime.

== History ==
The interest in the rights of navigation through straits dates as far back as the Peloponnesian War (c. 422 BC). Grotius early in the 17th century recognized the right of the owner of the shore to appropriate the water expanses that can be seen from the shore, and an obligation of the owner to allow innocent (unarmed) navigation through these waters. Grotius also suggested the right for the owner to collect fees for such passage. The latter practice, supported by Puffendorf and later by de Vattel, persisted until the mid-19th century, when Denmark dropped the levies for the passage of Danish belts and sunds (cf. the Copenhagen Convention of 1857 abolishing the Sound Dues that were collected for four hundred years).

De Vattel was the first to highlight the difference between the straits that "serve as a mean of communication between two [high] seas" and the one without such function. The passage of ships through the former cannot be prohibited as long as it does not adversely affect the security of the coastal state. While Vattel based his ideas on the Roman law concept of right of way, many other 18th century thinkers supported the right of a coastal state to exclude foreign ships from its territorial waters.

With the arrival of steamships in the 19th century, the ability to navigate along the shortest route became a significant economic factor, spurring development of special regimes for transit, similar to high seas. At the same time, a distinction was made between the wartime and peacetime navigation.

A major effort on codification of the legal regime for the straits was made by the Institut de Droit International (IDI) between 1894 and 1912. 1894, in particular, saw the proclamation of the innocent passage principle in those straits where there are no high seas lanes due to overlapping territorial waters. Some work was also done by the International Law Association (ILA) between 1893 and 1910 and Inter-Parliamentary Union between 1910 and 1915. Like the IDI's declarations, these efforts were stopped by the First World War, no international agreements followed, and the discussion at the Second Peace Conference (1907) only made it clear that the international straits require their own regime. No agreement was reached at the 1930 Hague Conference on Codification either. Overall, per the 1992 statement of the Office for Ocean Affairs and the Law of the Sea, "the treatment of the question of straits [...] between 1894 and 1930 was unsatisfactory".

The "now classic" book on international straits by Erik Brüel, International Straits. A Treatise on International Law, was published in the 1947.

The Corfu Channel case at the International Court of Justice (ICJ) in 1949 established the rules for the innocent passage through a strait:

- the international strait is defined geographically by being a connection between two areas of high seas, it does not have to be a route heavily used by international shipping;
- warships have the right of innocent passage through such strait that cannot be denied or subject to conditions in peacetime.

Still, the incident that was considered in the case had shown the limits of innocent passage: the rules of this regime makes the warships participating in the freedom of navigation operation vulnerable in case of encounter with the navy of a coastal state.

The Convention on the Territorial Sea and the Contiguous Zone, adopted in 1958 by UNCLOS I, codified the work of the International Law Commission done since 1949. Regarding the straits, the convention introduced a non-suspendable innocent passage for those international straits connecting high seas to a territorial sea of a foreign state. Otherwise, international straits were governed by the same innocent passage provisions as other territorial waters.

Major changes to strait passage were made by UNCLOS III (1982) that were driven both by objective factors (a dramatic increase in sea and air traffic, concerns about pollution and accidents in straits, and the general desire of coastal states to increase their territorial sea to 12 nautical miles) and the common interest of the United States and Soviet Union in opening sea and air passage through the international straits. Although during the planning of the conference it was declared that it will concentrate on the exploitation of sea beds, in practice it was to large extent driven by the desire of "the United States and the Soviet Union [...] to protect their strategic interests in transiting the oceans, particularly international straits". As a result of political compromise, UNCLOS III adopted its "crowning achievement", a new transit passage regime with no previous legal precedents. This regime provided the coastal states with much less enforcement ability in the straits.

== Sources ==
- Alexander, Lewis M. (1991). "International straits". In Robertson, Horace B. Jr. (ed.). The Law of Naval Operations. International law studies. Vol. 64. pp. 91–108.
- Brovka, Yu. P. (2009). "Международный пролив" [International strait] (PDF). Белорусская юридическая энциклопедия [Belorussian law encyclopedia] (in Russian). Минск: ГИУСТ БГУ. p. 223.
- SJ Advocate (2021). "International Straits". International Law Studies. 97. Stockton Center for International Law: 39–44. ISSN 2375-2831.
- López Martín, Ana G. (2010). International Straits: Concept, Classification and Rules of Passage. Springer Berlin Heidelberg. ISBN 978-3-642-12906-3.
- Law, Jonathan, ed. (2022-03-17). "international strait". A Dictionary of Law (10th ed.). Oxford, United Kingdom: Oxford Quick Reference. ISBN 978-0-19-289749-7.
- Priestnall, Graham (1997). "The Regimes of Archipelagic Sea Lanes Passage and Straits' Transit Passage – Similarities and Differences". Maritime Studies. 1997 (96): 1–12. doi:10.1080/07266472.1997.10878494. ISSN 0726-6472.
- Oral, Nilufer (2019). "Navigating the Oceans: Old and New Challenges for the Law of the Sea for Straits Used for International Navigation". Ecology Law Quarterly. 46 (1). University of California, Berkeley: 163–190. ISSN 0046-1121. JSTOR 26853549.
- Bugajski, Dariusz R. (2021). Navigational rights and freedoms in the international law and practice. Akademia Marynarki Wojennej. p. 89. ISBN 978-83-961549-1-0. OCLC 1267382284.
