= HMS Superb (25) =

Minotaur-class cruiser

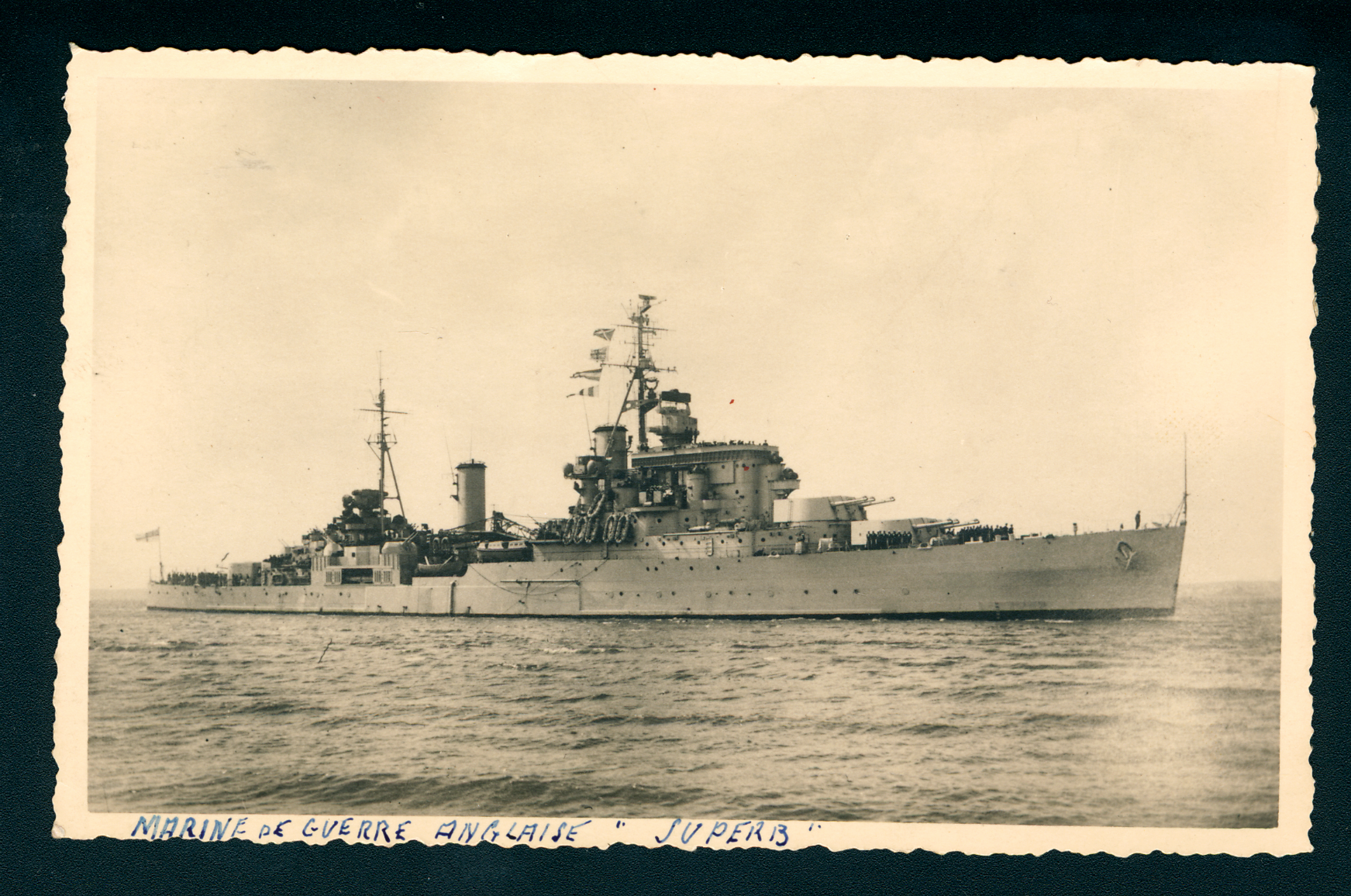
- HMS Superb

History

United Kingdom
- Name: HMS Superb
- Builder: Swan Hunter & Wigham Richardson, Wallsend, Tyne and Wear
- Laid down: 23 June 1942
- Launched: 31 August 1943
- Commissioned: 16 November 1945
- Decommissioned: 1957
- Identification: Pennant number: 25
- Fate: Scrapped at Dalmuir by Arnott Young, arriving on 8 August 1960

General characteristics
- Class & type: Minotaur-class light cruiser
- Displacement: 8,885 tons standard; 11,560 tons full
- Length: 555.5 ft (169.3 m)
- Beam: 64 ft (20 m)
- Draught: 17.25 ft (5.26 m)
- Propulsion: Four Admiralty-type three drum boilers; Four shaft Parsons steam turbines; 72,500 shp (54,100 kW)
- Speed: 31.5 knots (58.3 km/h)
- Range: 2,000 nautical miles (3,700 km) at 30 knots (60 km/h); 8,000 nautical miles (15,000 km) at 16 knots (30 km/h); 1,850 tons fuel oil
- Complement: 867
- Armament: Three triple 6-inch / 50 Mk 23 guns; Five dual 4-inch / 45 QF Mk 16 HA; Four quad 2 pdr (40 mm); Six single 40 mm AA; Two triple 21 inch (533 mm) torpedo tubes.
- Armour: Belt: 3.25 to 3.5 in (83 to 89 mm); Deck: 2 in (51 mm); Turrets: 1 to 2 in (25 to 51 mm); Bulkheads: 1.5 to 2 in (38 to 51 mm)

HMS Superb was a Minotaur-class light cruiser of the Royal Navy. The ship entered service in 1945 and had a brief, quiet career before being decommissioned in 1957 after her modernisation was cancelled. She was broken up in 1960.

== Design and description ==
Superb was the last of the Minotaurs to be built, and was completed to a slightly different design to that of the previous members of the class, with a foot more beam than her immediate predecessor HMS Swiftsure, which had introduced Type 274 lock and follow radar directors for surface action. With Superb the first Type 275 sets, modified versions of the lock and follow radar, were introduced to also control anti-aircraft fire of the twin 4-inch mounts. Unfortunately the versions of 275 fitted were the British glasshouse director version, which had higher tolerances and less reliability than the American versions of the set, which were reserved for the latter Battle-class destroyers and aircraft carriers Eagle and Ark Royal under construction and in particular the last battleship, Vanguard, for its secondary armament. Construction on her unfinished sister ships was halted after the end of the war and they were later scrapped, or converted into the new Tiger-class automatic gun cruiser. Superb herself was planned to be converted to full automatic 6-inch and 3-inch/70 gun Tiger specifications and would have been much more suitable for such modernisation than the narrower beam Swifsure. The plans to modernise Superb at the time of the 1957 Defence Review were much more cost constricted and would have been similar to the limited modernisation of HMS Belfast, with new MRS8 multi channel directors for four twin 4-inch and six twin proximity fused L70 Bofors and new radar, fire control and AIO and a data link to the modernised carriers Victorious and Hermes. Superb's update was cancelled in April 1957.

== Construction and career ==
Superb's keel was laid by Swan Hunter & Wigham Richardson, of Wallsend, Tyne and Wear on 23 June 1942. The ship was launched on 31 August 1943 and commissioned on 16 November 1945.

Superb was involved in the Corfu Channel Incident in 1946, but otherwise had an unremarkable career. In 1953 she took part in the Fleet Review to celebrate the Coronation of Queen Elizabeth II. The cruiser spent some time as the flagship of Rear Admiral Sir Herbert Packer, was refitted in 1955–1956, and decommissioned 18 months later in December 1957. She was approved for disposal 2 years later and arrived at the Dalmuir yards of Arnott Young on 8 August 1960 to be scrapped.

Although Superb was the latest of the line of 6-inch gun cruisers to be completed, (the 1943 Minotaur class followed directly from the 1938 Colony and 1936 Town classes), she was also one of the first of this type to be broken up. Plans for her modernisation were abandoned after the 1957 defence review. No more cruiser modernisations were approved, with new guided missile ships to take precedence. Pre-war ships lasted longer, showing the difference between peacetime and wartime building standards.

== Publications ==
- Brown, D. K. & Moore, George (2003). Rebuilding the Royal Navy: Warship Design Since 1945. Annapolis, Maryland: Naval Institute Press. ISBN 1-59114-705-0.
- Colledge, J. J.; Wardlow, Ben & Bush, Steve (2020). Ships of the Royal Navy: The Complete Record of All Fighting Ships of the Royal Navy from the 15th Century to the Present (5th ed.). Barnsley, UK: Seaforth Publishing. ISBN 978-1-5267-9327-0.
- Friedman, Norman (2010). British Cruisers: Two World Wars and After. Barnsley, UK: Seaforth Publishing. ISBN 978-1-59114-078-8.
- Murfin, David (2010). "AA to AA: The Fijis Turn Full Circle". In Jordan, John (ed.). Warship 2010. Naval Institute Press. ISBN 978-1-84486-110-1.
- Raven, Alan & Roberts, John (1980). British Cruisers of World War Two. Annapolis, Maryland: Naval Institute Press. ISBN 0-87021-922-7.
- Whitley, M. J. (1995). Cruisers of World War Two: An International Encyclopedia. London: Cassell. ISBN 1-86019-874-0.
