= Straits of Corfu =

Channel between the Greek island of Corfu and the coasts of Greece and Albania

Coordinates: 39.77°N 19.97°E

- Location within Greece Location within Europe

- The Corfu Channel or Straits located to the east of Kassiopi. The line demarcates the Greek-Albanian border.
- Basin countries: Greece

The Straits of Corfu or Corfu Channel is the narrow body of water along the coasts of Albania and Greece to the east, separating these two countries from the Greek island of Corfu on the west. The channel is a passage from the Adriatic Sea on the north to the Ionian Sea that is used by shipping local to Albania and Greece to the ports of Saranda, Albania, and Igoumenitsa, Greece, and by local and tourist traffic in Albania and from the Greek mainland to Corfu, in addition to some international traffic from the Adriatic.

== Corfu Channel Incident ==
The Corfu Channel Incident refers to three separate incidents involving Royal Navy ships in the Straits of Corfu which took place in 1946, and it is considered an early episode of the Cold War. During the first incident, Royal Navy ships came under fire from Albanian fortifications. The second incident involved Royal Navy ships striking mines and the third incident occurred when the Royal Navy conducted mine-clearing operations in the Corfu Channel, but in Albanian territorial waters, and Albania complained about them to the United Nations. This series of incidents led to the Corfu Channel Case, where the United Kingdom brought a case against the People's Republic of Albania to the International Court of Justice. Because of the incidents, Britain, in 1946, broke off talks with Albania aimed at establishing diplomatic relations between the two countries. Diplomatic relations were only restored in 1991.
