= Anthony Carty =

British legal scholar (born 1947)

John Anthony "Tony" Carty, (born 1947), is a legal scholar at the Beijing Institute of Technology. Previously, he was a law professor at Tsinghua University and the University of Hong Kong after a career in Britain.

== Education ==
He received an LL.B. (Queen's University Belfast in 1968, an LL.M. (University College, London, 1969), and a PhD (Cambridge, 1973)

== Career ==
Carty was Eversheds Professor, University of Derby, 1994-2003, Professor of Law, University of Westminster 2003-2005, and then Professor of Public Law, University of Aberdeen from January 2006- on. He is also the holder of the Sir Y K Pao Chair of Public Law, University of Hong Kong, from April 2009 to 2015.

From 2010 on, he is the 'Editor in Chief of the Online Oxford Bibliography of International Law

Carty's research interests focus on international law, including International legal theories, human rights, the theory of autonomous regions within states, such as Scotland, the Basque Country etc., law and development, law and literature and legal philosophy, especially the history of legal thought.

== Publications ==
=== Books ===
- Carty, A. History and Sovereignty of the South China Sea Islands, Publisher New Star Press - February 1, 2024
- Carty, A. and Smith, A. McC. (eds.), Power and Manoeuvrability: The International Implications of an Independent Scotland, Q Press, Edinburgh, ISBN 0-905470-04-4
- Carty, A. Philosophy of International Law, Edinburgh : Edinburgh University Press, 2007. According to WorldCat, the book is held in 808 libraries
- Carty, A and Smith, R. A. Sir Gerald Fitzmaurice and the World Crisis: A Legal Adviser in the Foreign Office 1932-1945, Kluwer (2000)
- Carty, A., (ed.) Post-modern law : enlightenment, revolution, and the death of man Edinburgh : Edinburgh University Press, ©1990.
- Carty, A. and G M Danilenko, eds. Perestroika and international law : current Anglo-Soviet approaches to international law New York : St. Martin's Press, 1990.

=== Articles ===
- Independence and the Scottish Political Imagination, in Hearn, Sheila G. (ed.), Cencrastus No. 11, New Year 1983, pp. 26 – 28, ISSN 0264-0856
- Scottish Legal Culture and the Withering Away of the State: A Study in MacCormick's Nationalism, in Hearn, Sheila G.(ed.), Cencrastus No. 14, Autumn 1983, pp. 5 – 9, ISSN 0264-0856
