= Transit passage =

Concept of the law of the sea

Transit passage is a concept of the law of the sea that allows a vessel or aircraft the freedom of navigation or overflight solely for the purpose of continuous and expeditious transit of a strait from one part of the high seas or an exclusive economic zone to another. The requirement of continuous and expeditious transit does not preclude passage through the strait for the purpose of entering, leaving or returning from a state bordering the strait, subject to the conditions of entry to that state. The transit passage may be exercised regardless of the nationality (flag) of the ship, its form of ownership, the merchant or government status of a ship or warship, or the private or government status of an aircraft (under the Convention on International Civil Aviation of 1944).

Within such straits (article 37 of UNCLOS), including Arctic straits, all ships and aircraft enjoy the right of transit passage (article 38 of UNCLOS), in accordance with Part III of UNCLOS, which means the right of navigation and overflight solely for the purpose of continuous and expeditious transit of the strait between one part of the high seas or an exclusive economic zone and another part of the high seas or an exclusive economic zone.

This navigation rule is codified in Part III of the United Nations Convention on the Law of the Sea. Some countries have not ratified the convention, but most of them, including the US, accept the customary navigation rules as codified in the Convention. This navigation rule took on more importance with UNCLOS III as that convention confirmed the widening of territorial waters from three to twelve nautical miles, causing more straits not to have a navigation passage between the territorial waters of the coastal nations.

Transit passage exists throughout the entire strait, not just in the area overlapped by the territorial waters of the coastal nations. The ships and aircraft of all nations, including warships, auxiliaries, and military aircraft, enjoy the right of unimpeded transit passage in such straits and their approaches. Submarines are free to transit international straits submerged, as that is their normal mode of operation. Transit passage rights do not extend to any state's internal waters within a strait.

The legal regime of transit passage exists for all straits used for international navigation where there is not a simple alternative route, and excluding those instances where there is a long-standing international convention governing the straits, namely the Danish Straits, the Sea of Åland, the Turkish Straits, the straits of Tiran, the Strait of Magellan and the Beagle Channel. The major international trade routes of the Strait of Gibraltar, Dover Strait, Strait of Hormuz, Bab-el-Mandeb and Strait of Malacca are covered by the transit passage provisions.

Artificial maritime canals, such as the Corinth Canal, are generally not covered by the UNCLOS and fall instead under the respective national laws, with the three notable exceptions of the globally important canals due to their prior treaties: the Kiel Canal, the Panama Canal and the Suez Canal.

== Related rights ==
Innocent passage is a similar right that applies to the entire territorial sea (and certain grandfathered internal waters) of states – not just straits – and has more restrictive requirements for passing vessels. Freedom of navigation is a similar right that applies to international waters.

Introduction of transit passage in UNCLOS III made the right of innocent passage in the straits relatively unimportant due to sheer dominance of the straits covered by the transit passage regime in terms of both numbers and importance.

UNCLOS III also added the archipelagic sea lanes passage (ASLP) regime that is similar to the transit passage, but applies to the sea lanes passing through the archipelagic waters.

== In time of armed conflict ==
The right of transit passage through international straits under UNCLOS remains valid during armed conflict. However, the laws of armed conflict are not negated in straits, and belligerents may take military action against vessels transiting straits in accordance with customary international law, codified in the San Remo Manual on International Law Applicable to Armed Conflicts at Sea.

When a coastal state bordering a strait is in an armed conflict, per the San Remo Manual, it can attack belligerent vessels under an enemy flag and neutral vessels of states that are assisting the enemy. Attacking is subject to the laws of armed conflict, including proportionality and military necessity.

== See also ==
- 2026 Strait of Hormuz crisis

== Sources ==
- López Martín, Ana G. (2010). International Straits: Concept, Classification and Rules of Passage. Springer Berlin Heidelberg. ISBN 978-3-642-12906-3.
- Mahmoudi, Said; Leopardi, Martin Ratcovich (January 2021). "Transit Passage". Oxford Public International Law.
- Priestnall, Graham (1997). "The Regimes of Archipelagic Sea Lanes Passage and Straits' Transit Passage – Similarities and Differences". Maritime Studies. 1997 (96): 1–12. doi:10.1080/07266472.1997.10878494. ISSN 0726-6472.
