= Tripartite Commission for the Restitution of Monetary Gold =

Attempt to recover gold stolen by the Nazis

The Tripartite Commission for the Restitution of Monetary Gold, also known as the Tripartite Gold Commission, was a panel established in September 1946 by the United Kingdom, United States and France to recover gold stolen by Nazi Germany from other nations and eventually return it to the rightful owners. The commission was headquartered in Brussels.

After recovering gold and receiving claims for it, the Commission found that it had insufficient resources to pay back all of the countries in full. Thus, each country received about 65% of its claim from the gold reserves recovered by the commission. The Commission completed its work and was formally dissolved on September 9, 1998.

== Claimant countries ==
- Albania
- Austria
- Belgium
- Czechoslovakia
- Greece
- Italy
- Luxembourg
- Netherlands
- Poland
- Yugoslavia
