= Corfu Channel incident =

1946–48 altercations between the United Kingdom and Albania

- Part of the Cold War
- Corfu Channel incident
Date	15 May – 13 November 1946
Location	Corfu Channel 39.77°N 19.97°E
Result	World Court case concluded in 1949

Belligerents
Albania	United Kingdom

Commanders and leaders
(Albania) Enver Hoxha; (Albania) Mehmet Shehu	(United Kingdom) Clement Attlee

Units involved
Albanian Naval Force	Royal Navy

Casualties and losses
None	44 killed 42 wounded 2 destroyers damaged (one of them beyond repair)

The Corfu Channel incident consists of three events involving Royal Navy ships in the Channel of Corfu in 1946 and it is considered an early episode of the Cold War. During the first incident, Royal Navy ships came under fire from Albanian fortifications. The second incident involved Royal Navy ships striking mines and the third occurred when the Royal Navy conducted mine-clearing operations in the Corfu Channel, but in Albanian territorial waters, and Albania complained about them to the United Nations.

This series of incidents led to the Corfu Channel case, where the United Kingdom brought a case against the People's Republic of Albania to the International Court of Justice. The Court rendered a decision under which Albania was to pay £844,000 to the United Kingdom. This is equivalent to £45.9 million in 2026 terms. Because of the incidents, Britain in 1946 broke off talks with Albania aimed at establishing diplomatic relations between the two countries. Diplomatic relations were only restored in 1991.

== History ==
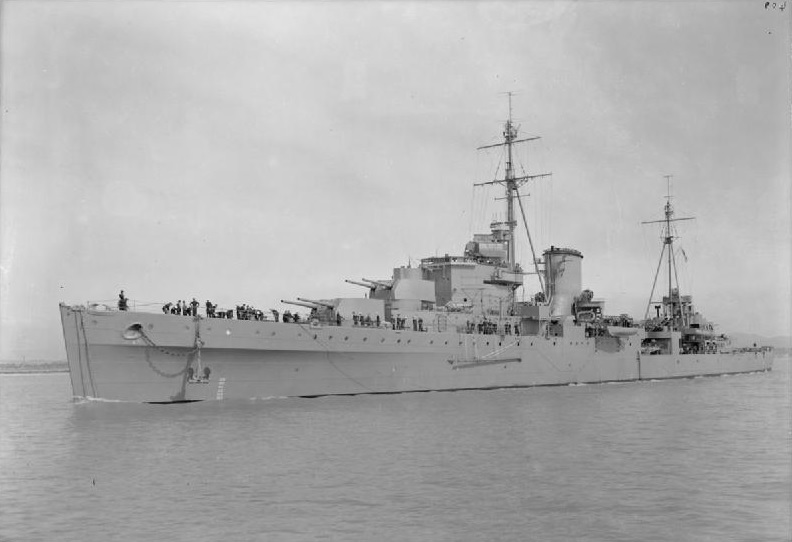
HMS Orion was one of the ships fired on in the first incident

The incidents started proper on 15 May 1946 when seven Royal Navy ships, including HMS Orion and HMS Superb, crossed the Corfu Channel following a prior inspection and clearing of the strait. While crossing, they came under fire from Albanian artillery in coastal fortifications. The shells missed and the British warships could not return fire. Although the ships suffered no material damage and no human casualties occurred, Britain issued a formal demand for "an immediate and public apology from the Albanian Government". Such apology was not forthcoming, however, and the Albanian Government claimed that the British ships had trespassed into Albanian territorial waters. Albania issued a warning that prior notice should be given for all vessels passing through the Corfu Channel. The British government declared that it would not give prior notice and threatened that if British warships were fired on again, they would return fire.

The second incident was more serious. On 22 October 1946, a Royal Navy flotilla composed of the cruisers HMS Mauritius and HMS Leander, with accompanying destroyers, was ordered northward through the Corfu Channel with express orders to test the Albanian reaction to their right of innocent passage. The crews were instructed to respond if attacked.

They were passing close to the Albanian coast in what they considered to be a mine-free zone with Mauritius leading and HMS Saumarez following closely. Leander was about one and two-thirds of a nautical mile or three kilometres away accompanied by HMS Volage. Near the bay of Saranda, just prior to 3 p.m., the destroyer Saumarez struck a mine and was heavily damaged. The destroyer Volage was ordered to tow Saumarez south to a Corfu harbour.

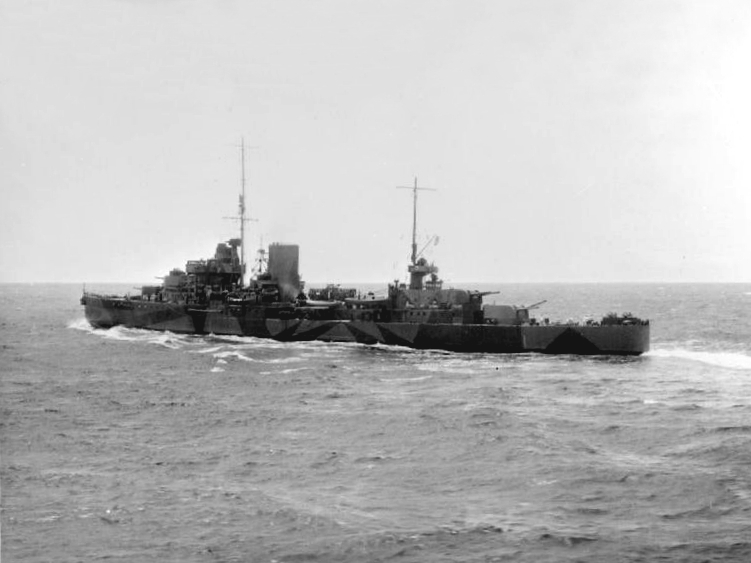
Light cruiser HMS Leander was present during the second incident

At approximately 4:16 p.m., while towing, Volage also struck a mine and sustained heavy damage. The ship's bow was completely blown off and adverse weather conditions in the straits made the towing effort exceedingly difficult with all ships sailing stern-first, but after twelve hours of effort all ships managed to reach the Corfu harbour. Forty-four men died and forty-two were injured in the incident.

Between thirty-two and forty-three of the dead are estimated to have belonged to the crew of Saumarez. Saumarez was damaged beyond repair while the damage to Volage was repairable. The Albanian coastal batteries did not fire during this incident and an Albanian Navy ship approached the scene flying the Albanian flag and a white flag. The mines were allegedly laid by Yugoslavian Navy minelayers Mljet and Meljine on Albanian request, around 20 October 1946.

The British Minister of Pensions at the time of the incident awarded full military pensions to the disabled and to the widows of the dead.

The third and final incident occurred on 12–13 November 1946 when the Royal Navy carried out an additional mine sweeping operation in the Corfu channel, codenamed "Operation Retail". Under the direction of the Allied Commander-in-Chief Mediterranean the minesweeping operation took place within Albanian territorial waters, but without authorisation by the Albanian government, and had the additional purpose of using the mines as corpora delicti to prove that the British were acting in self defence by attempting to clear hazards to navigation.

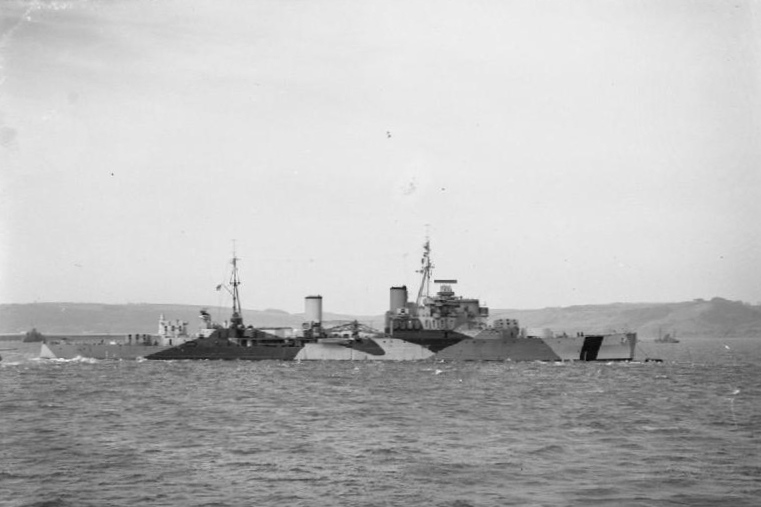
Light cruiser HMS Mauritius was present during the second incident

There was also present a French naval officer who, at the invitation of the Mediterranean Zone Board, acted as an observer. An aircraft carrier (HMS Ocean), cruisers and other warships provided cover. Twenty-two contact mines were discovered and cut from their undersea moorings. The placement of the mines was such that the minefield was deemed to have been deliberately designed and not simply a random aggregation of isolated mines. Two of the cut mines were sent to Malta for further examination.

It was then discovered that the mines were of German origin but they were free of rust and marine growth. They were also freshly painted and their mooring cables were recently lubricated. It was concluded that the minefield was laid shortly before the incident involving Saumarez and Volage. Mine fragment analysis from Volage confirmed the mines were similar to the ones at Malta.

Following the third incident, Albania, under prime minister Enver Hoxha, dispatched a telegram to the United Nations complaining about an incursion by the Royal Navy into Albanian coastal waters.

== Aftermath ==
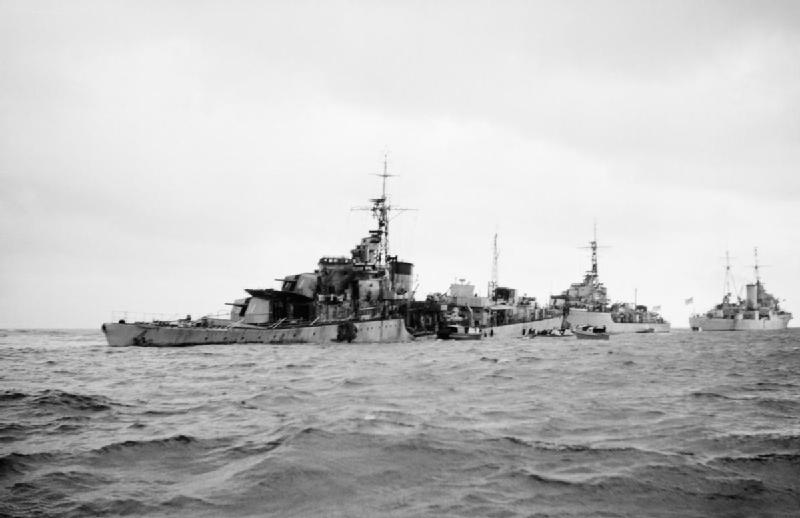
Saumarez under tow by Volage after being mined, October 1946

On 9 December 1946, Britain sent a note to the Albanian government accusing Albania of laying the mines and demanding reparations for the May and October incidents. Britain demanded a reply within fourteen days, mentioning that in the event of an Albanian refusal to pay reparations the matter would be referred to the UN Security Council. The British were confident they would prevail. In its reply, which was received by the British on 21 December 1946, the Albanian government denied the British allegations and went on to claim that the whole affair was the work of countries which did not wish to see a normalisation of relations between Albania and Britain; and in fact vessels from Greece and other countries had trespassed recently in the area where the mines were discovered.

The British government did not find this response satisfactory and it eventually brought its case to the International Court of Justice, having failed in its attempt to involve the Security Council in the matter. It was the first case adjudicated by the ICJ, and in December 1949 the court awarded the British the sum of £843,947 or US$2,009,437 having found that, irrespectively of who laid the mines, the Albanians ought to have observed any such action, since the minefield was so close to their coast, and thus they failed to inform the British of the danger. The Court also rejected the self-defence argument advanced by the United Kingdom and found that the mine-clearing operations undertaken by the Royal Navy during Operation Retail, in the absence of prior consent from the Albanian government, were illegal.

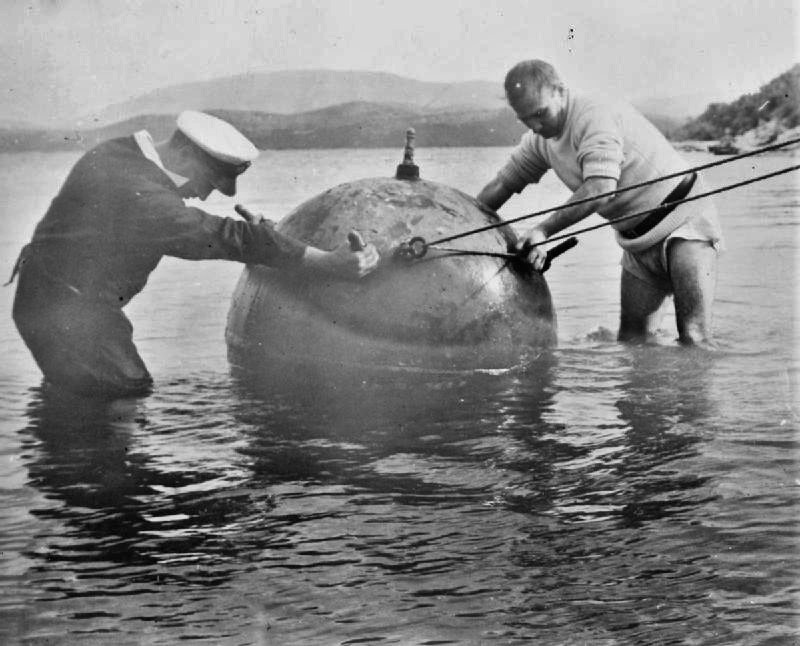
One of the mines being inspected after being swept, 12 December 1946.

The Albanian government refused to pay the reparations ordered by the Court and in retaliation the British government withheld 1,574 kilograms of Albanian gold from entering the country. The gold, looted by the Axis powers from Albania during World War II, was stored in the vaults of the Bank of England and was awarded to the Albanians by the US-UK-France tripartite commission in 1948 after it was retrieved by the Allies.

With the end of the Cold War, the People's Socialist Republic of Albania ceased to exist in 1992. Diplomatic relations between the two countries were established on 29 May 1991. Soon after, on 8 May 1992, Britain and Albania announced that they had come to an agreement over the Corfu Channel case, jointly announcing that "Both sides expressed their regret at the Corfu Channel Incident of 22 October 1946". Only in 1996 following lengthy negotiations was the gold finally returned to Albania after it agreed to pay US$2,000,000 in delayed reparations.

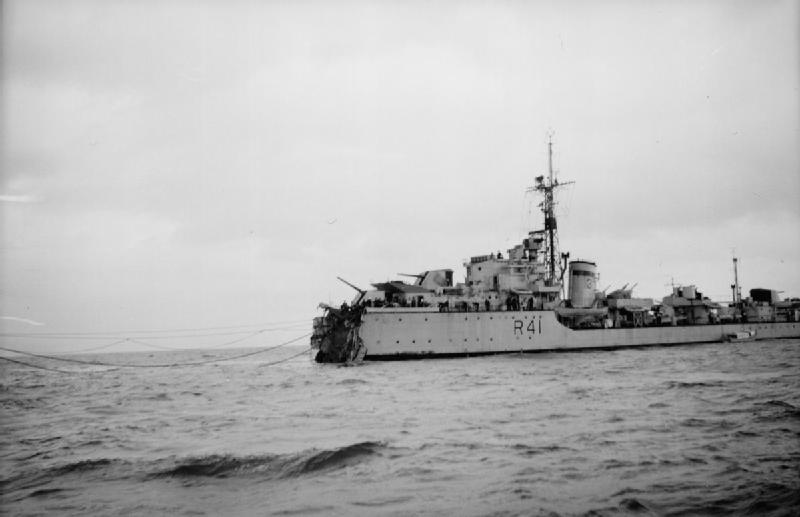
Volage after being mined, October 1946

Enver Hoxha, in his memoirs about his first meeting with Joseph Stalin, claimed that the whole affair was concocted by the British as an excuse to conduct naval patrols near Saranda. Hoxha also wrote that "We have never planted mines in the Ionian Sea. The mines that exploded had either been laid by the Germans in the time of war, or were deliberately laid by the British, later, so that they could explode them". He also criticised the presence of the Royal Navy in the region, writing that "There was no reason for these ships to be sailing along our coast, they had not notified us about such a movement." Hoxha also described the events as "an unprecedented provocation toward our country".

On 2 November 2009, a team of US and Albanian researchers announced that they found what they believe to be the bow segments of HMS Volage in the Corfu Channel under approximately fifty metres of water. Dishes, shoes and ammunition found in the area surrounding the wreckage are further evidence that fits, according to the researchers. In May 2013, a special edition of Archaeology Magazine entitled "Shipwrecks", specifically, the article "Righting a Cold War Wrong: Where was HMS Volage?" gave insight into the new discoveries of the case. The Director of the Albanian Center for Marine Research, Auron Tare obtained film footage from The National Archives of the incident purportedly showing HMS Volage very close to the shore when the incident occurred. This claim was further reinforced by James P. Delgado, Director of Maritime Heritage for the National Oceanic and Atmospheric Administration (NOAA). He reasserted his claim made previously to Associated Press that the wreck was that of HMS Volage because the electrical wiring of the bow section discovered matched the specifications of the Volage. The fact that the bow section, with dishes intact and stacked according to Delgado showed a rapid sinking had occurred.

== International law ==
The International Court of Justice ruling in the case established a precedent regarding whether a violation of territorial sovereignty is justified intervention. The United Kingdom claimed it was justified in entering Albanian territorial waters on 12 and 13 November 1946 to secure evidence needed to support its case. The ICJ responded,

The Court cannot accept such a line of defence. The Court can only regard the alleged right of intervention as the manifestation of a policy of force, such as has, in the past, given rise to most serious abuses and such as cannot, whatever be the present defects in international organisation, find a place in international law. Intervention is perhaps still less admissible in the particular form it would take here; for, from the nature of things, it would be reserved for the most powerful States, and might easily lead to perverting the administration of inter-national justice itself. The United Kingdom Agent, in his speech in reply, has further classified "Operation Retail" among methods of self-protection or self-help. The Court cannot accept this defence either. Between independent States, respect for territorial sovereignty is an essential foundation of international relations. The Court recognises that the Albanian Government's complete failure to carry out its duties after the explosions, and the dilatory nature of its diplomatic notes, are extenuating circumstances for the action of the United Kingdom Government. But to ensure respect for international law, of which it is the organ, the Court must declare that the action of the British Navy constituted a violation of Albanian sovereignty.

== See also ==
- USS Monocacy incident
- General Sherman incident
- HMS Hunter
