= Convention on the Territorial Sea and the Contiguous Zone =

1958 United Nations treaty

The Convention on the Territorial Sea and Contiguous Zone of 1958 is an international treaty which entered into force on 10 September 1964, one of four agreed upon at the first United Nations Conference on the Law of the Sea (UNCLOS I). 52 states are parties to the convention, whether through ratification, succession, or accession.

Many parties to this convention have since ratified the 1982 United Nations Convention on the Law of the Sea, which came into force in 1994 and supersedes this convention for those states that have ratified UNCLOS.
