= Avulsion (river) =

Rapid abandonment of a river channel and formation of a new channel

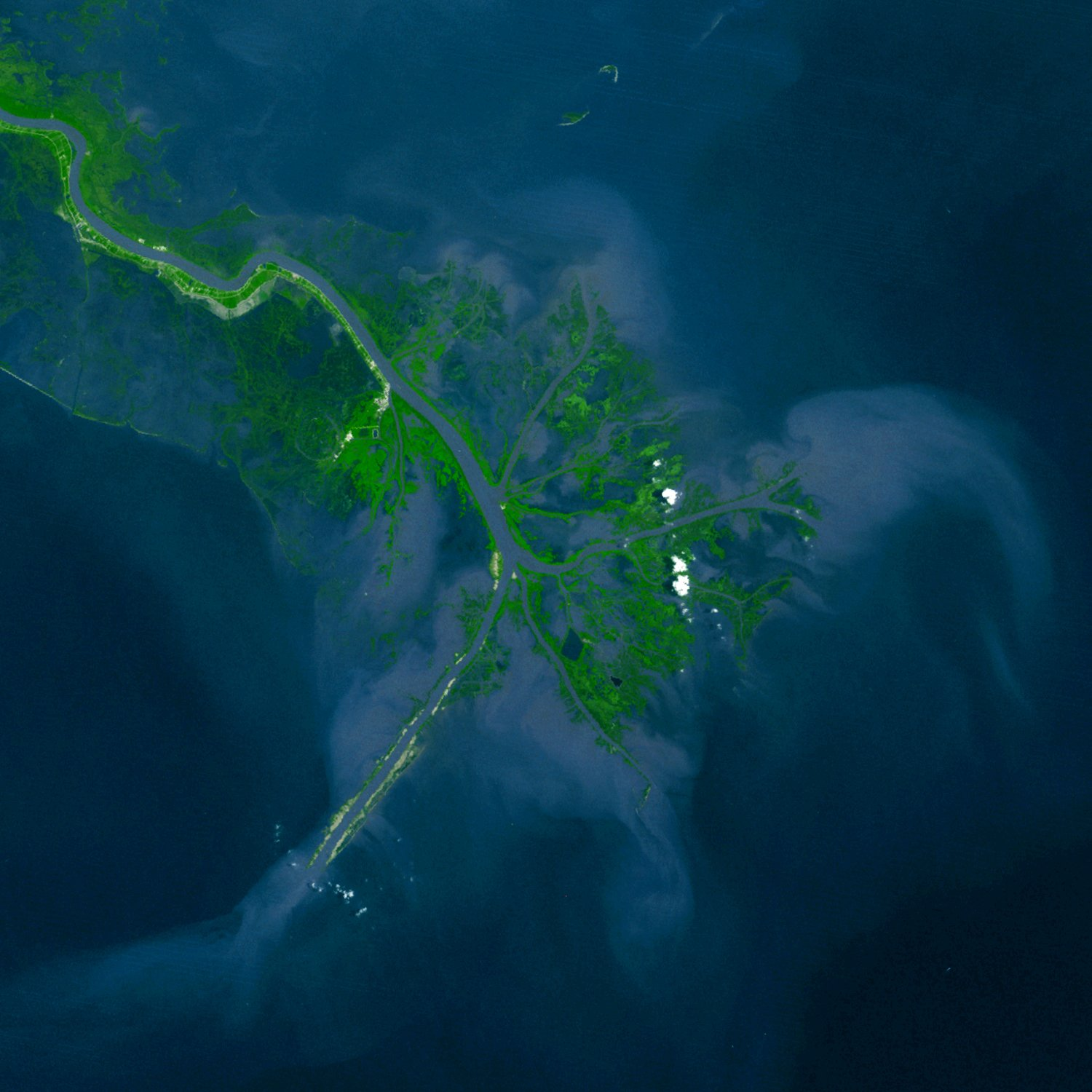
Plumes of sediment enter the ocean from several mouths of the Mississippi River bird's-foot delta. This sediment is responsible for building the delta and allowing it to advance into the sea. As it extends further offshore, the channel slope will decrease and its bed will aggrade, promoting an avulsion.

In sedimentary geology and fluvial geomorphology, avulsion is the process by which flow is diverted out of an established river channel and into a new course via a bifurcation, or splitting of the channel. Avulsions range from full, in which all flow is diverted from one channel to another, to partial, in which only a portion of flow is diverted. Avulsions were once thought to occur as a result of channel slopes that are much less steep than the slope that the river could follow if it took a new course (i.e., the slope advantage of one channel over another), but it is now recognized that many factors, including upstream channel planform, channel cross-sectional geometry at a bifurcation, and channel obstructions such as wood or beaver dams can also influence the rate and progression of avulsions.

== Deltaic and net-depositional settings ==
Avulsions are common in river deltas, where sediment deposits as the river enters the ocean and channel gradients are typically very small. This process is also known as delta switching.

Deposition from the river results in the formation of an individual deltaic lobe that pushes out into the sea. An example of a deltaic lobe is the bird's-foot delta of the Mississippi River with its sediment plumes. As the deltaic lobe advances, the slope of the river channel becomes lower, as the river channel is longer but has the same change in elevation. As the slope of the river channel decreases, it becomes unstable for two reasons. First, water under the force of gravity will tend to flow in the most direct course downslope. If the river could breach its natural levees (i.e., during a flood), it would spill out onto a new course with a shorter route to the ocean, thereby obtaining a more stable steeper slope. Second, as its slope is reduced, the amount of shear stress on the bed will decrease, resulting in deposition of more sediment within the channel and thus raising of the channel bed relative to the floodplain. This will make it easier for the river to breach its levees and cut a new channel that enters the ocean at a steeper slope.

When this avulsion occurs, the new channel carries sediment out to the ocean, building a new deltaic lobe. The abandoned delta eventually subsides.

This process is also related to the distributary network of river channels that can be observed within a river delta. When the channel does this, some of its flow can remain in the abandoned channel. When these channel switching events happen repeatedly over time, a mature delta will gain a distributary network.

Subsidence of the delta and/or sea-level rise can further cause backwater and deposition in the delta. This deposition fills the channels and leaves a geologic record of channel avulsion in sedimentary basins. On average, an avulsion will occur every time the bed of a river channel aggrades enough that the river channel is superelevated above the floodplain by one channel-depth. In this situation, enough hydraulic head is available that any breach of the natural levees will result in an avulsion.

== Erosional avulsions ==
Rivers can also avulse due to the erosion of a new channel that creates a straighter path through the landscape. This can happen during large floods in situations in which the slope of the new channel is significantly greater than that of the old channel. Where the new channel's slope is about the same as the old channel's slope, a partial avulsion will occur in which both channels are occupied by flow. An example of an erosional avulsion is the 2006 avulsion of the Suncook River in New Hampshire, in which heavy rains caused flow levels to rise. The river level backed up behind an old mill dam, which produced a shallowly-sloping pool that overtopped a sand and gravel quarry, connected with a downstream section of channel, and cut a new shorter channel at 25–50 meters per hour. Sediment mobilised by this erosional avulsion produced a depositionally-forced meander cutoff further downstream by superelevating the bed around the meander bend to nearly the level of the floodplain.

Another example is the Cheslatta River, once a small tributary of the Nechako River in British Columbia. In the 1950s the Cheslatta River was made to be the spillway of the then new Nechako Reservoir. The discharge of the spills far exceeds the original flow of the Cheslatta River, which has resulted in major erosion in the upper Cheslatta valley, with the scoured sediment being deposited in the lower valley. Large reservoir spills caused the lower Cheslatta River to avulse in 1961 and again in 1972, carving a new route to the Nechako River and depositing a fan of sediment called the Cheslatta Fan in the Nechako River. After 1972 a cofferdam was built to restore the river to its original course.

== Meander cutoffs ==
An example of a minor avulsion is known as a meander cutoff, when a pronounced meander (hook) in a river is breached by a flow that connects the two closest parts of the hook to form a new channel. This occurs when the ratio between the channel slope and the potential slope after an avulsion is less than about 1/5.

== Occurrence ==
Avulsion typically occurs during large floods which carry the power necessary to rapidly change the landscape. Dam removal could also lead to avulsion.

Avulsions usually occur as a downstream to upstream process via head cutting erosion. If a bank of a current stream is breached a new trench will be cut into the existing floodplain. It either cuts through floodplain deposits or reoccupies an old channel.

Avulsions have been investigated in deltas or coastal plain channels as a result of obstructions such as log-jams and possible tectonic influences.

== See also ==
- Aggradation – Increase in land elevation due to the deposition of sediment
- Alluvial fan – Fan-shaped deposit of sediment
- Lake Ragunda – Former whitewater rapid on the river Indalsälven, Sweden
- Meander – One of a series of curves in a channel of a matured stream
- Megafan – Large fan-shaped deposit
- River delta – Silt deposition landform at the mouth of a river
- River plume – Mix of fresh river water and seawater
- Stream capture – Geomorphological phenomenon
