= Megafan =

Large fan-shaped deposit

An alluvial megafan is a large cone or fan-shaped deposit built up by complex deposition patterns of stream flows originating from a single source point known as an apex. Megafans differ from alluvial fans in their sheer size. Due to their larger size, they may be formed by different geomorphic processes. The criterion of what differentiates megafans from typical alluvial fans is an artificial one of scale. The scale divide varies in the literature, with the most common being a 100-km apex-to-toe length. Alternative values as little of 30-km apex-to-toe length have been proposed, as well as alternative metrics like coverage areas of greater than 10,000 square-km.

== Formation ==
The flow source from the apex occupies a portion of the fans apron, building up that portion with depositions. Through complex processes like avulsion, the stream changes course over time occupying different areas of the fan. Over long periods of time, sediment builds up creating a fan formation. Generally the three-dimensional architecture of megafan deposits consists of multi-storied sandsheets, gravel in upper reaches, interbedded with overbank muddy layers, thickness and facies distribution vary from upstream to downstream reaches

Rivers forming large fans happen in various settings around the world most notably, in foreland settings (e.g. Kosi, Gandak, Pastaza), intracratonic basins (e.g. Pantanal, Taquari, Cuiaba), and in complex settings like in the case of Pilcomayo. Although the distribution of megafans occur throughout many environments, the tropics are home of the largest megafans of the world in the Chaco Plain, with the largest being the Pilcomayo.

=== Examples of Megafans ===
- Pilcomayo - Chaco Plain
- Grande - Chaco Plain
- Bermejo - Argentina
- Kosi - Gangetic plain of India
- Gandak - Gangetic plain of India
- Okavango - the Okavango delta in Botswana
- Taquari

== Gallery ==
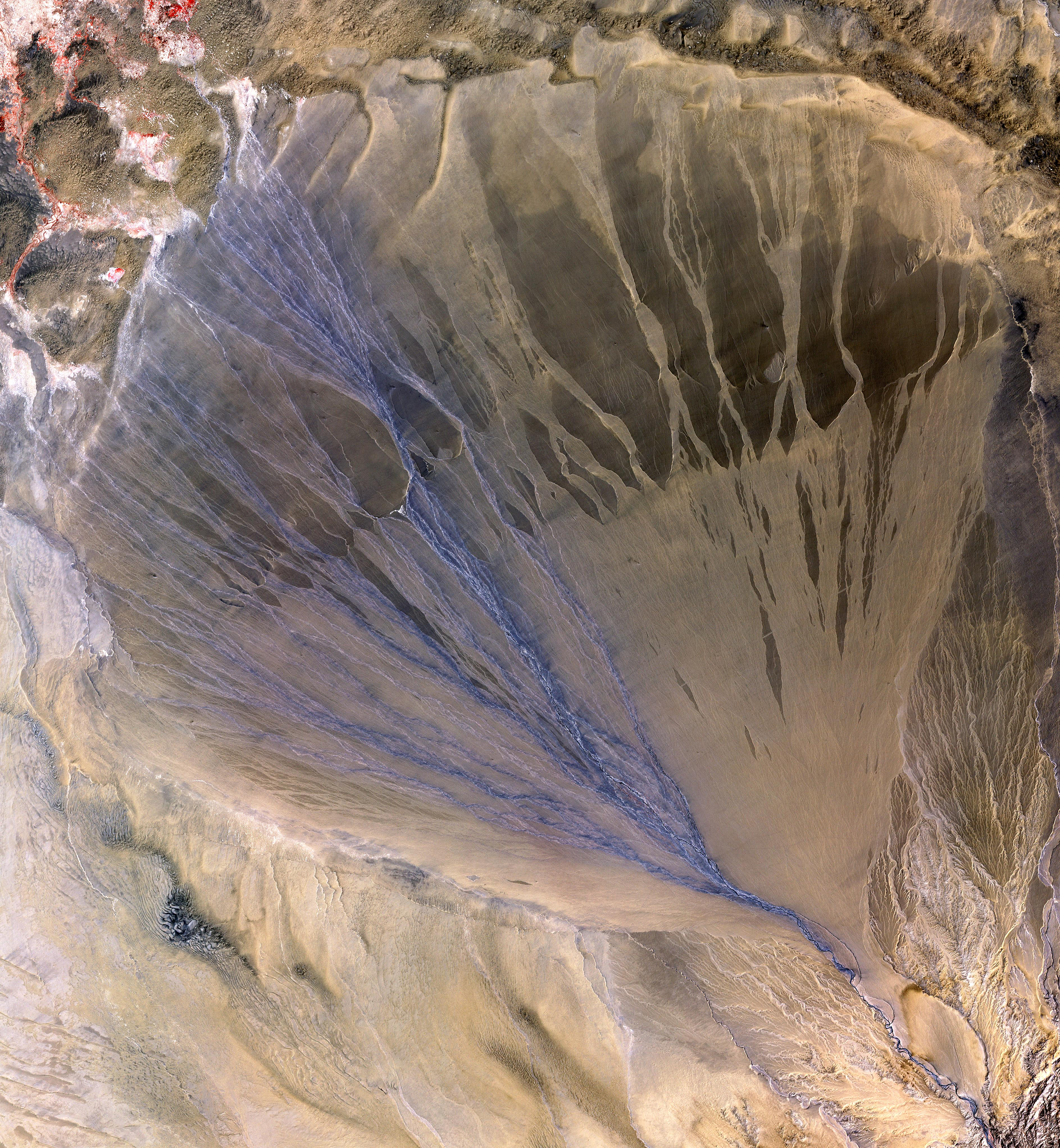
A 60 km long Megafan across the desolate landscape between the Kunlun and Altun mountain ranges that form the southern border of the Taklamakan Desert in Xinjiang. The left side is the active part of the fan, and appears blue from water flowing in the many small streams

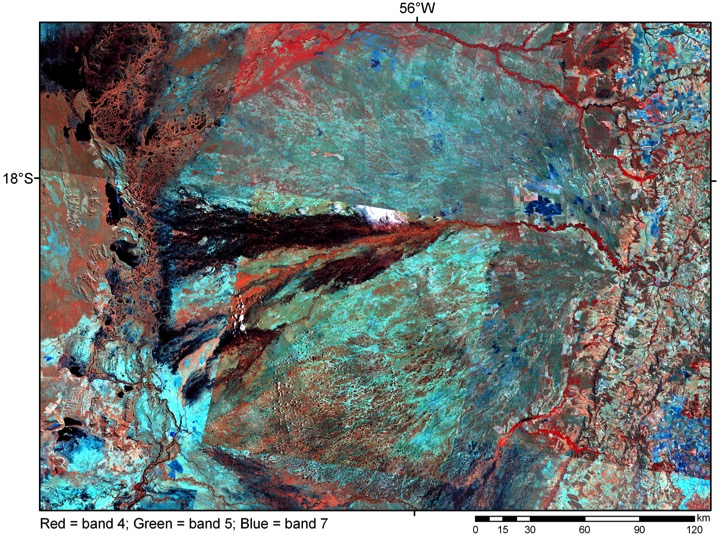
Taquari Megafan in the Pantanal Basin

== See also ==
- Alluvium
- Alluvial plain
- Alluvial fan
- Avulsion
- Floodplain
- Placer deposit
- River delta
- Subaqueous fan
