= Shoal =

Natural submerged sandbank that rises from a body of water to near the surface

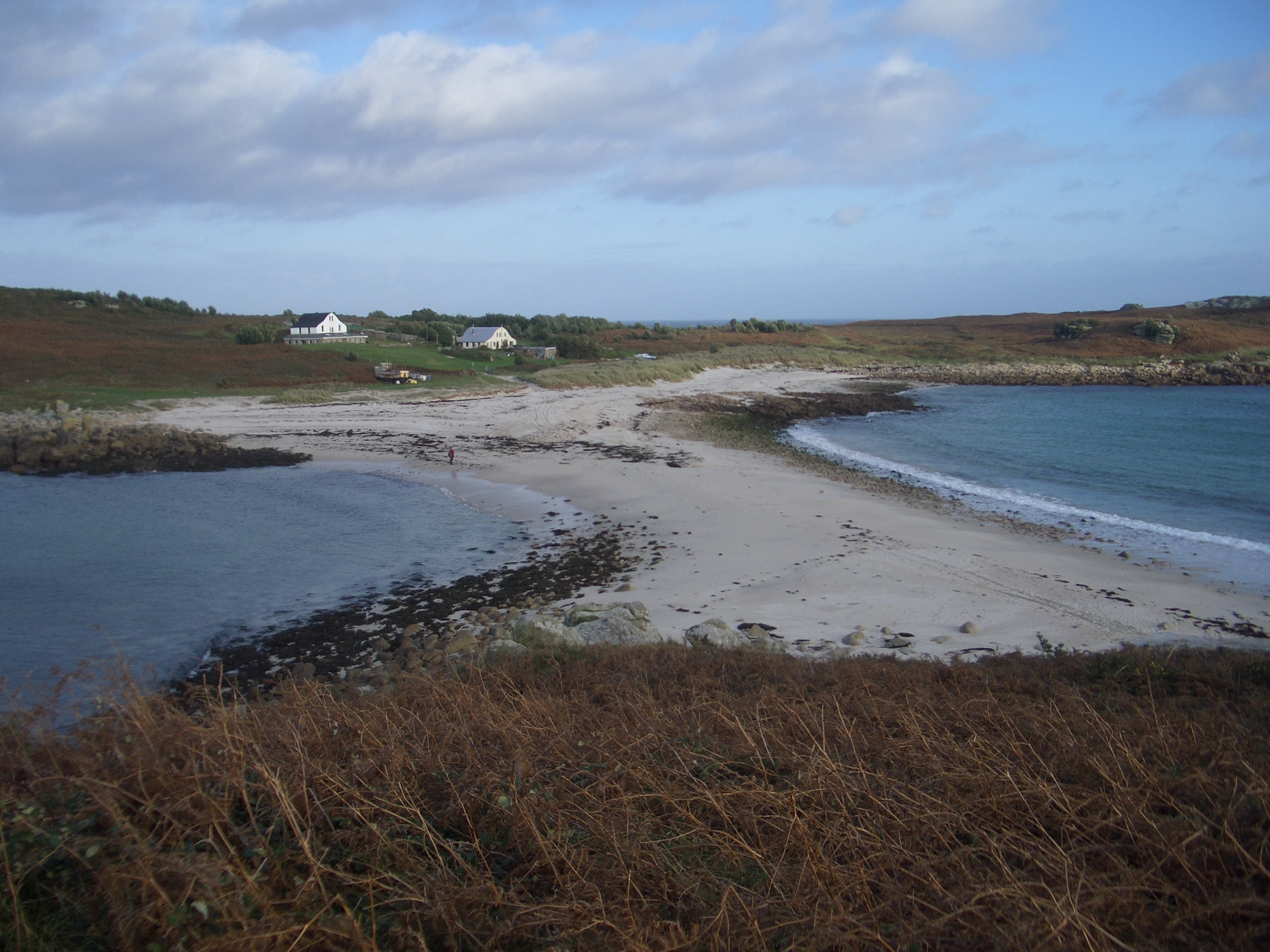
Sandbar between St Agnes and Gugh on the Isles of Scilly, off the coast of Cornwall, England, United Kingdom

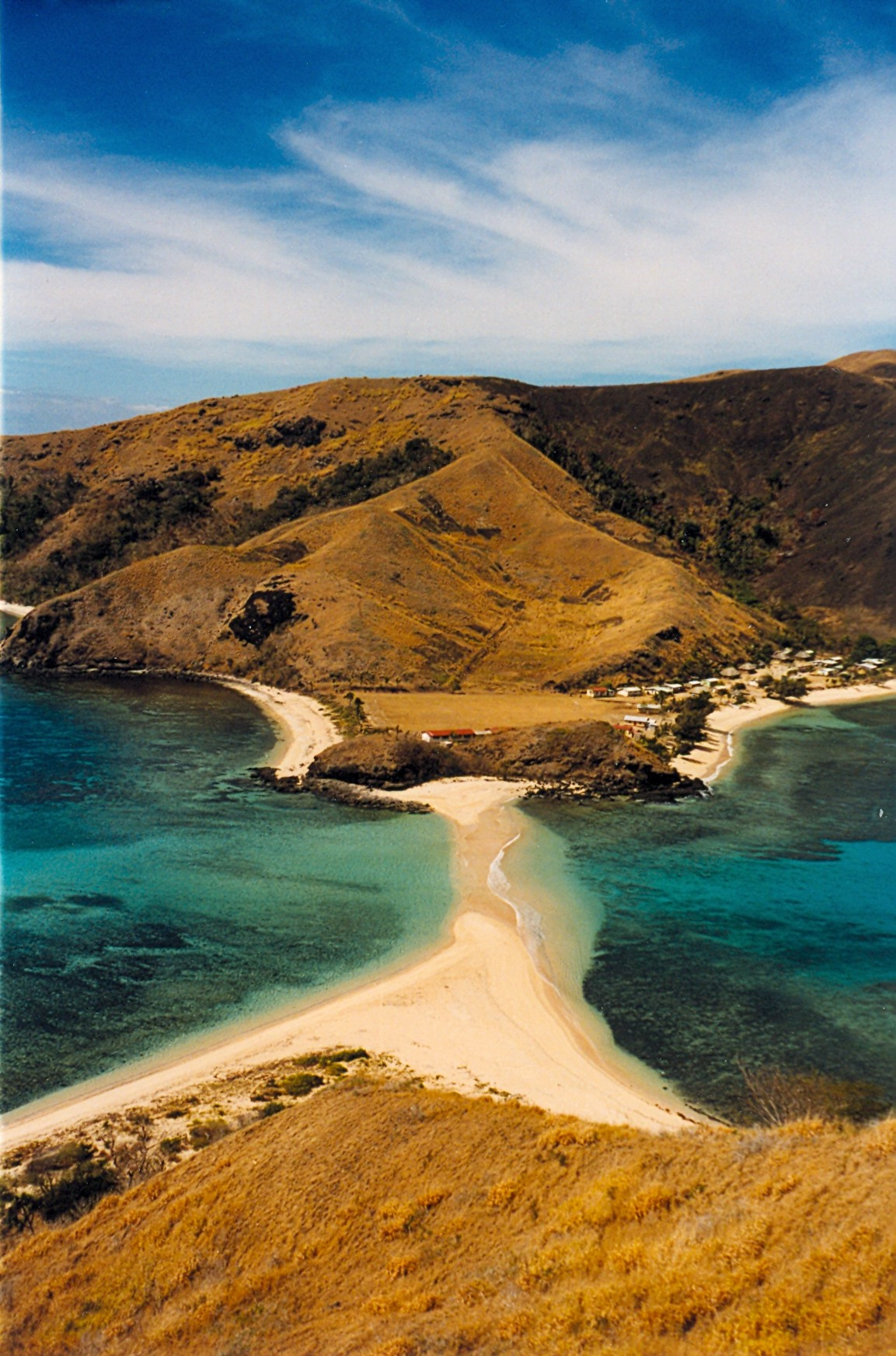
A tidal sandbar connecting the islands of Waya and Wayasewa of the Yasawa Islands, Fiji

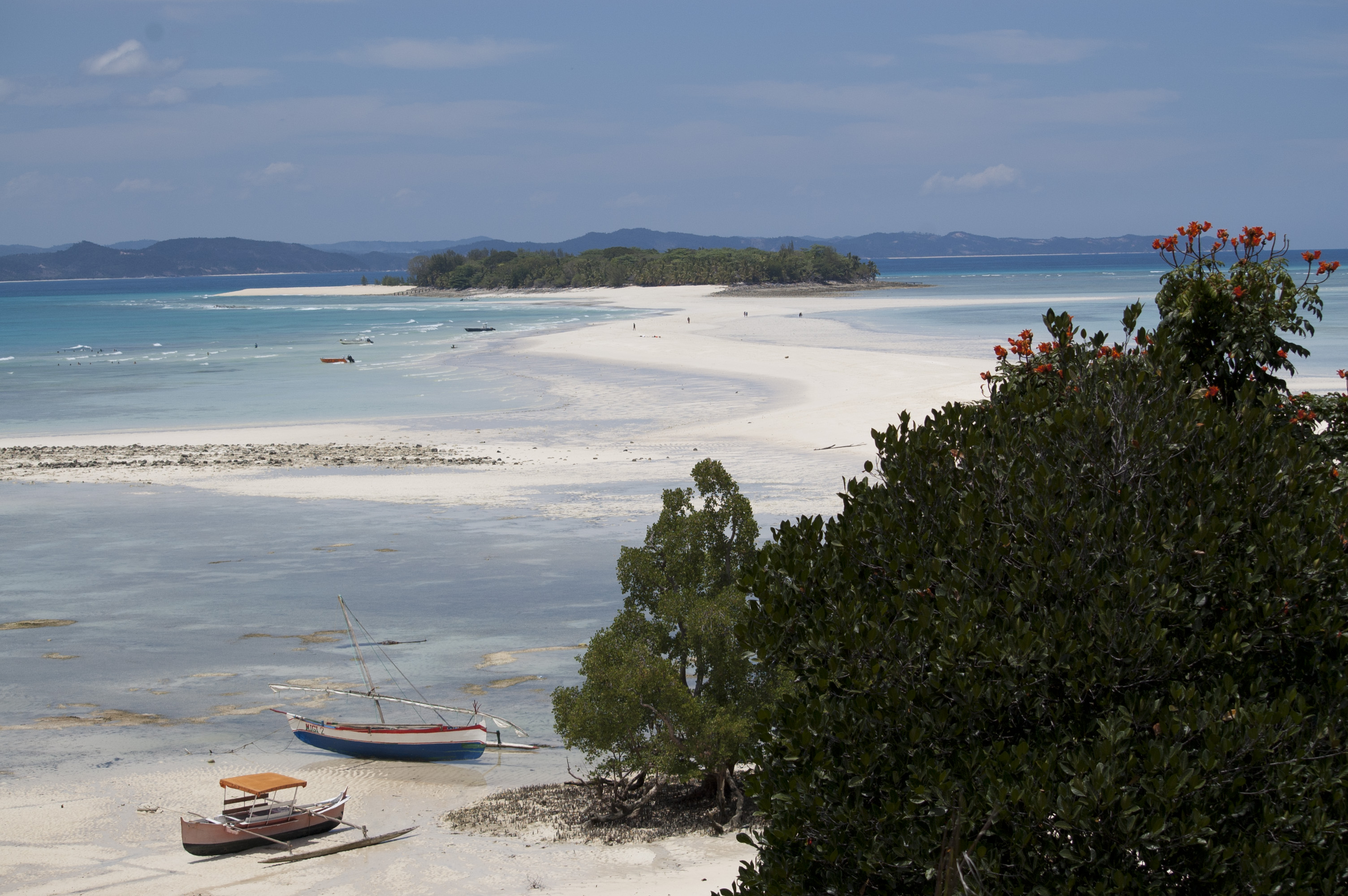
Sandbar between Nosy Iranja Be and Nosy Iranja Kely (Nosy Iranja, Madagascar)

A shoal is a natural submerged ridge, bank, or bar that consists of, or is covered by, sand or other unconsolidated material, and rises from the bed of a body of water close to the surface or above it, which poses a danger to navigation. Shoals are also known in oceanography, geomorphology, and geoscience, as sandbanks, sandbars, gravelbars, or bars. Two or more shoals that are either separated by shared troughs or interconnected by past or present sedimentary and hydrographic processes are referred to as a shoal complex.

Other uses of the term shoal either similar to or quite different from its application in geologic, geomorphic, and oceanographic literature, include any relatively shallow place in a stream, lake, sea, or other body of water; a rocky area on the seafloor within an area mapped for navigation purposes; or a growth of vegetation on the bottom of a deep lake, that occurs at any depth, or is used as a verb for the process of proceeding from a greater to a lesser depth of water.

== Description ==
Shoals are characteristically long and narrow (linear) ridges. They can develop where a stream, river, or ocean current promotes deposition of sediment and granular material, resulting in localized shallowing (shoaling) of the water. Marine shoals also develop either by the in-place drowning of barrier islands as the result of episodic sea level rise or by the erosion and submergence of inactive delta lobes.

Shoals can appear as a coastal landform in the sea, where they are classified as a type of ocean bank, or as fluvial landforms in rivers, streams, and lakes.

A shoal–sandbar may seasonally separate a smaller body of water from the sea, such as:

- Marine lagoons
- Brackish water estuaries
- Freshwater seasonal stream and river mouths and deltas.

The term bar can apply to landform features spanning a considerable range in size, from a length of a few meters in a small stream to marine depositions stretching for hundreds of kilometers along a coastline, often called barrier islands.

=== Composition ===
They are typically composed of sand, although they could be of any granular matter that the moving water has access to and is capable of shifting around (for example, soil, silt, gravel, cobble, shingle, or even boulders). The grain size of the material comprising a bar is related to the size of the waves or the strength of the currents moving the material, but the availability of material to be worked by waves and currents is also important.

== Formation ==
Wave shoaling is the process when surface waves move towards shallow water, such as a beach, they slow down, their wave height increases and the distance between waves decreases. This behavior is called shoaling, and the waves are said to shoal. The waves may or may not build to the point where they break, depending on how large they were to begin with, and how steep the slope of the beach is. In particular, waves shoal as they pass over submerged sandbanks or reefs. This can be treacherous for boats and ships.

Shoaling can also refract waves, so the waves change direction. For example, if waves pass over a sloping bank which is shallower at one end than the other, then the shoaling effect will result in the waves slowing more at the shallow end. Thus, the wave fronts will refract, changing direction like light passing through a prism. Refraction also occurs as waves move towards a beach if the waves come in at an angle to the beach, or if the beach slopes more gradually at one end than the other.

=== Types ===
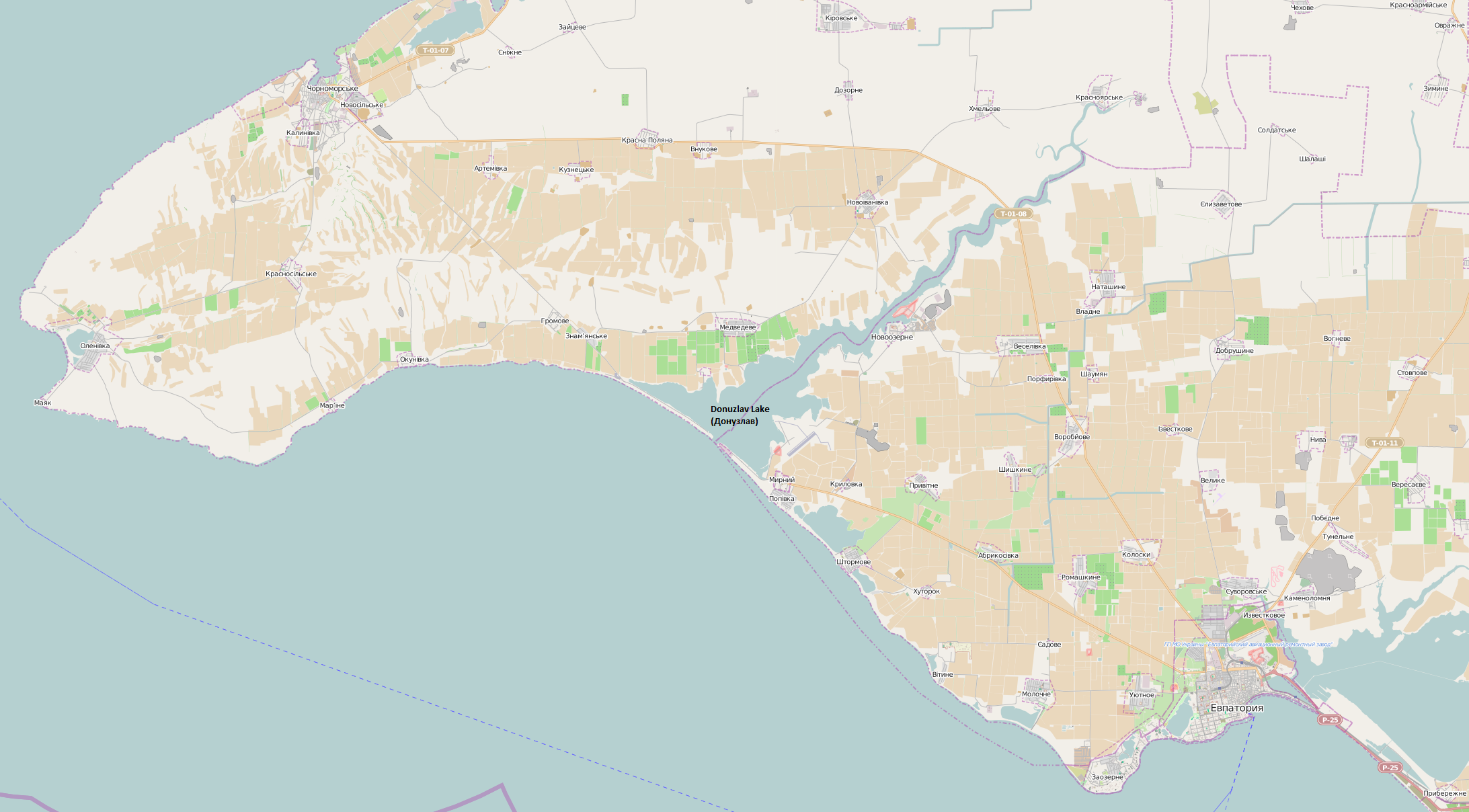
Donuzlav, Crimea, separated by a peresyp from the Black Sea

==== Sandbars and longshore bars ====
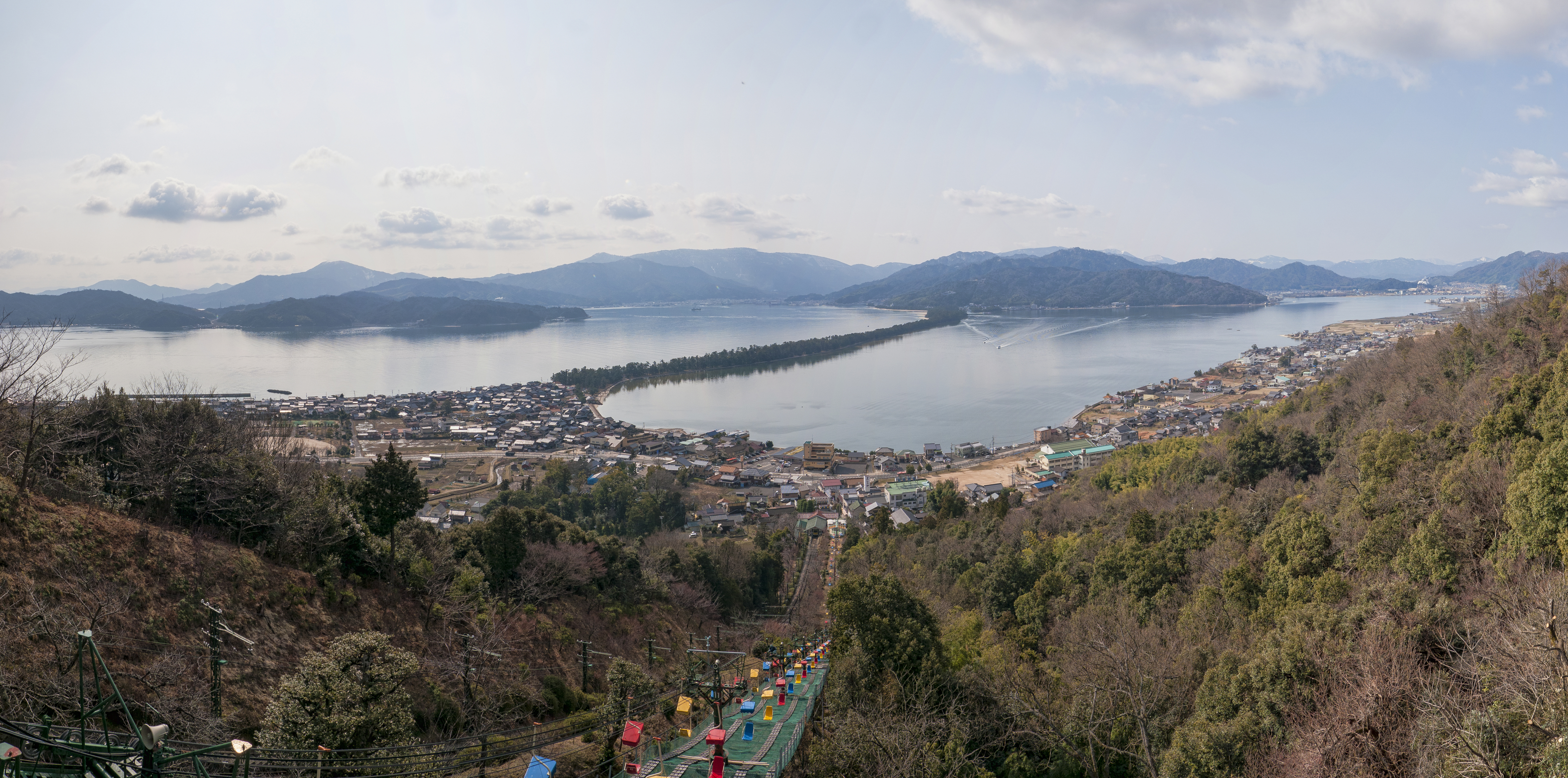
Amanohashidate in Miyazu, Kyoto Prefecture, Japan

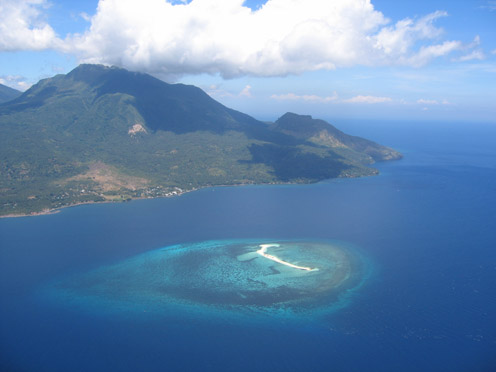
White Island in Camiguin, Philippines

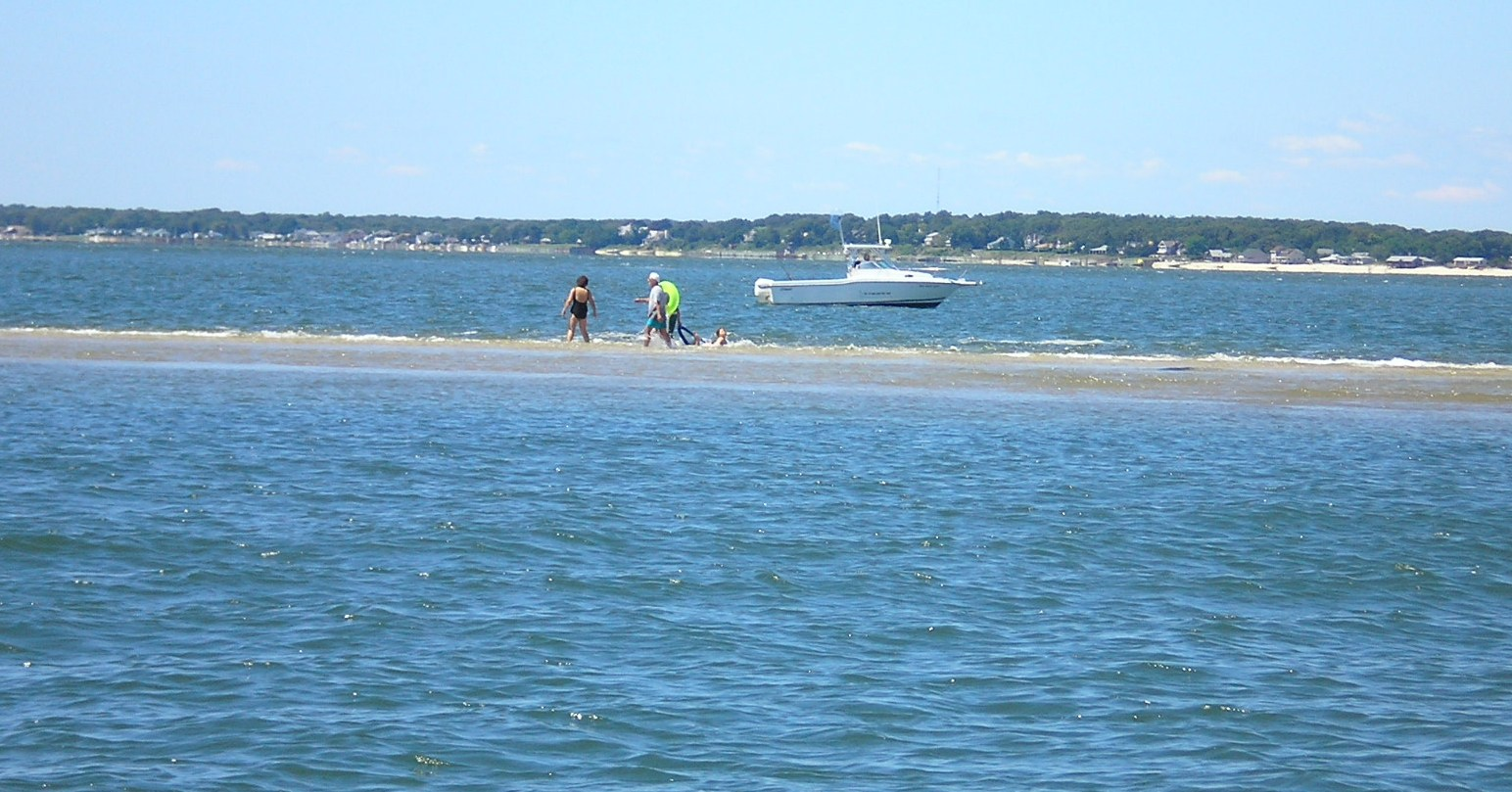
A sandbar off Suffolk County, Long Island, New York, US, August 2006

Sandbars, also known as a trough bars, form where the waves are breaking, because the breaking waves set up a shoreward current with a compensating counter-current along the bottom. Sometimes this occurs seaward of a trough (marine landform).

Sand carried by the offshore moving bottom current is deposited where the current reaches the wave break. Other longshore bars may lie further offshore, representing the break point of even larger waves, or the break point at low tide.

A bay-mouth bar forms across the mouth of a bay, while a bay-head bar forms across the head of a bay, near the shore.

a barrier bar runs parallel to a beach, typically along a low sandy coast and is separated from the beach by a shallow lagoon. It forms during high water levels (storm, high tide) and becomes exposed at lower water levels.

==== Peresyp ====
In Russian tradition of geomorphology, a peresyp is a sandbar that rises above the water level (like a spit) and separates a liman or a lagoon from the sea. Unlike tombolo bars, a peresyp seldom forms a contiguous strip and usually has one or several channels that connect the liman and the sea.

==== Harbor and river bars ====
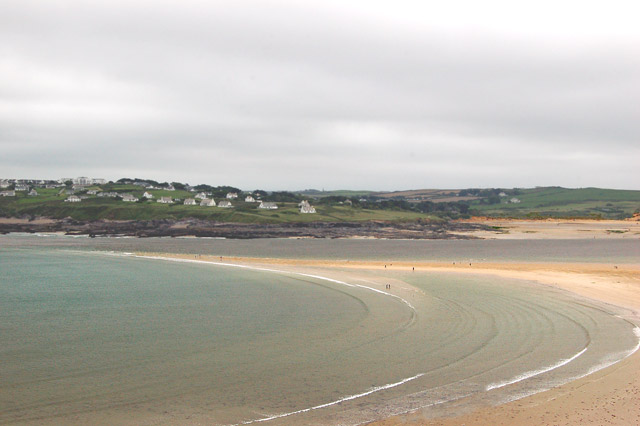
The Doom Bar sand bank extends across the River Camel estuary in Cornwall, England, UK

A harbor or river bar is a sedimentary deposit formed at a harbor entrance or river mouth by the deposition of freshwater sediment or by the action of waves on the sea floor or on up-current beaches.

Where beaches are suitably mobile, or the river's suspended or bed loads are large enough, deposition can build up a sandbar that completely blocks a river mouth and dams the river. It can be a seasonal natural process of aquatic ecology, causing the formation of estuaries and wetlands in the lower course of the river. This situation will persist until the bar is eroded by the sea, or the dammed river develops sufficient head to break through the bar.

The formation of harbor bars that prevent access for boats and shipping can be the result of:

- construction up-coast or at the harbor — e.g.: breakwaters, dune habitat destruction.
- upriver development — e.g.: dams and reservoirs, riparian zone destruction, river bank alterations, river adjacent agricultural land practices, water diversions.
- watershed erosion from habitat alterations — e.g.: deforestation, wildfires, grading for development.
- artificially created/deepened harbors that require periodic dredging maintenance.

===== Nautical navigation =====
In a nautical sense, a bar is a shoal, similar to a reef: a shallow formation of (usually) sand that is a navigation or grounding hazard, with a depth of water of 6 fathoms (11 meters) or less. It therefore applies to a silt accumulation that shallows the entrance to or course of a river, or creek. A bar can form a dangerous obstacle to shipping, preventing access to the river or harbor in poor weather conditions or at some states of the tide.

== Geological units ==
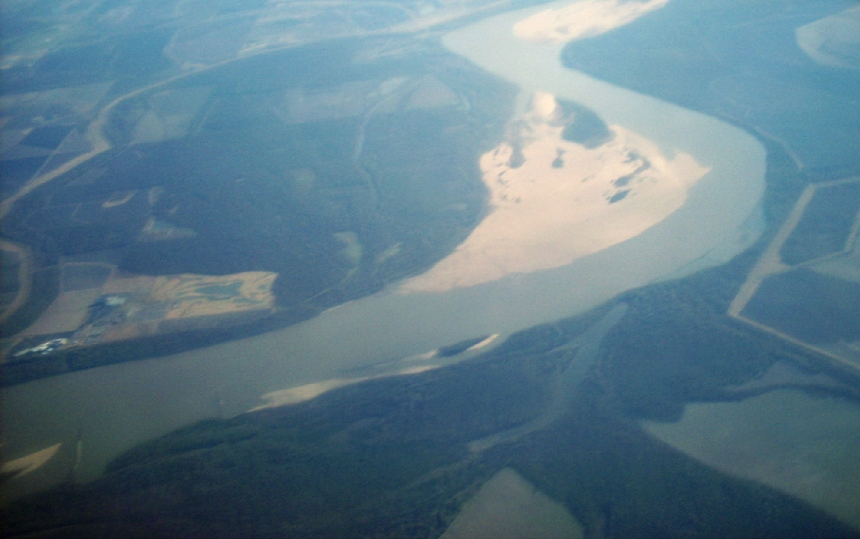
Shoals in the Mississippi River at Arkansas and Mississippi, USA.

However, in addition to longshore bars discussed above that are relatively small features of a beach, the term shoal can be applied to larger geological units that form off a coastline as part of the process of coastal erosion, such as spits and baymouth bars that form across the front of embayments and rias. A tombolo is a bar that forms an isthmus between an island or offshore rock and a mainland shore.

In places of reentrance along a coastline (such as inlets, coves, rias, and bays), sediments carried by a longshore current will fall out where the current dissipates, forming a spit. An area of water isolated behind a large bar is called a lagoon. Over time, lagoons may silt up, becoming salt marshes.

In some cases, shoals may be precursors to beach expansion and dunes formation, providing a source of windblown sediment to augment such beach or dunes landforms.

== Human habitation ==
Humans have inhabited shoals since prehistoric times. In some cases the locations provide easy exploitation of marine resources. In modern times, these sites are sometimes chosen for their water access or view, but many such locations are prone to storm damage.

An area in Northwest Alabama is commonly referred to as "The Shoals" by local inhabitants, and one of the cities, Muscle Shoals, is named for such landform and its abundance of mussels.

== See also ==
- Ayre (landform) – Shingle beaches in Orkney and Shetland
- Barrier island – Coastal dune landform
- Bank (geography) – Land alongside a body of water
- Coastal Barrier Resources Act — 1982 U.S. law
- Reef – Submerged ridge of rock, coral or other material
- Tombolo – Deposition landform in which an island is connected to the mainland by a sandy isthmus
- The Point of Sangomar – Sand spit located on the Atlantic Ocean at the mouth of the Saloum Delta
- Adam's Bridge – Chain of shoals between India and Sri Lanka
- List of shoals and sandbanks in the southern North Sea
