= Strait =

Waterway connecting two bodies of water

Diagrammatic map of a strait

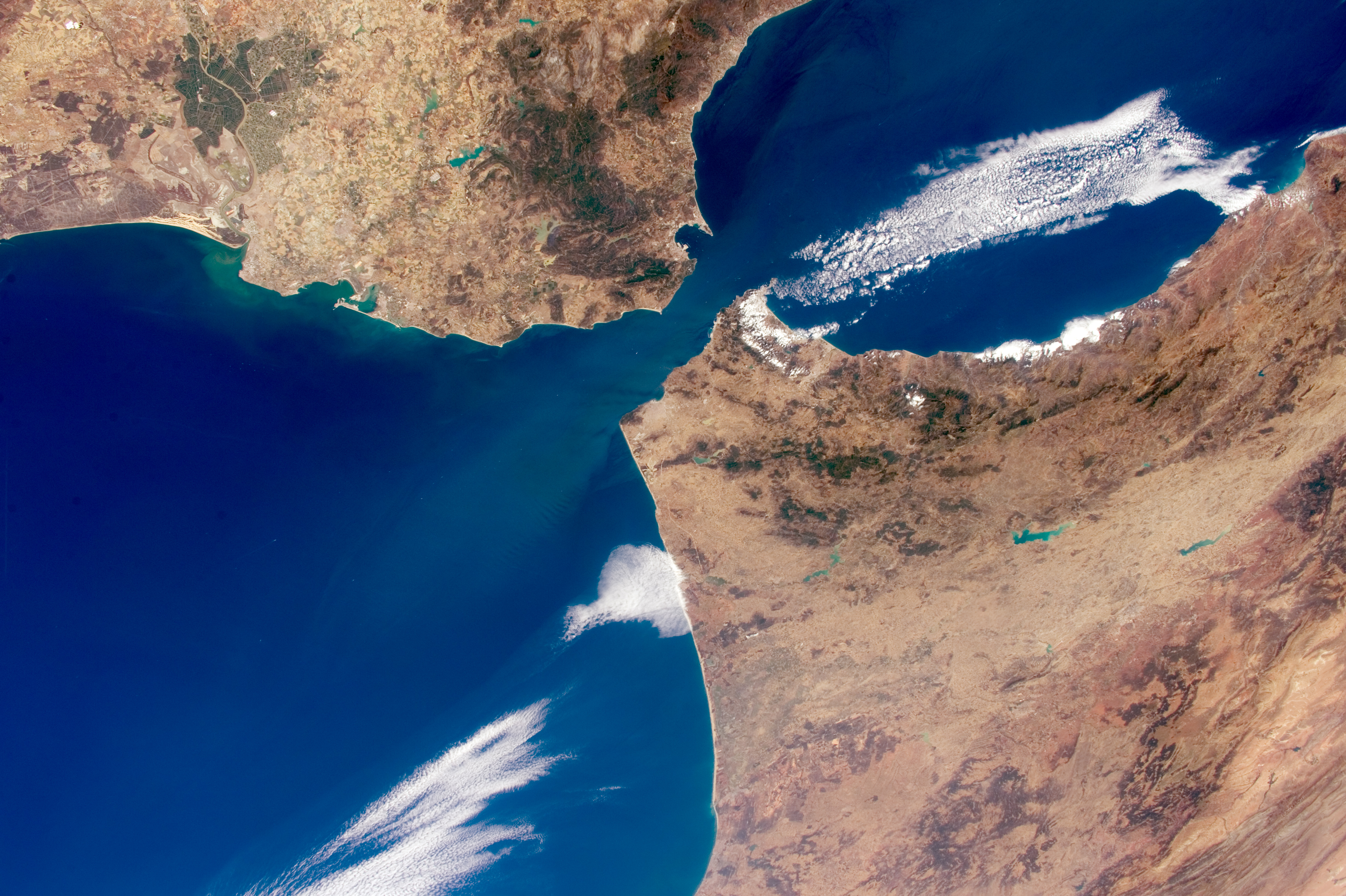
Strait of Gibraltar

A strait is a water body connecting two seas or water basins. The surface water is, for the most part, at the same elevation on both sides and can flow through the strait in either direction, although the topography generally constricts the flow somewhat. In some straits, there is a dominant directional current. Most commonly, the strait is a narrow channel that lies between two land masses. Straits are loci for sediment accumulation, with sand-sized deposits usually occurring on the two strait exits, forming subaqueous fans or deltas. Some straits are not navigable because they are too narrow, too shallow, or due to the presence of a reef or archipelago.

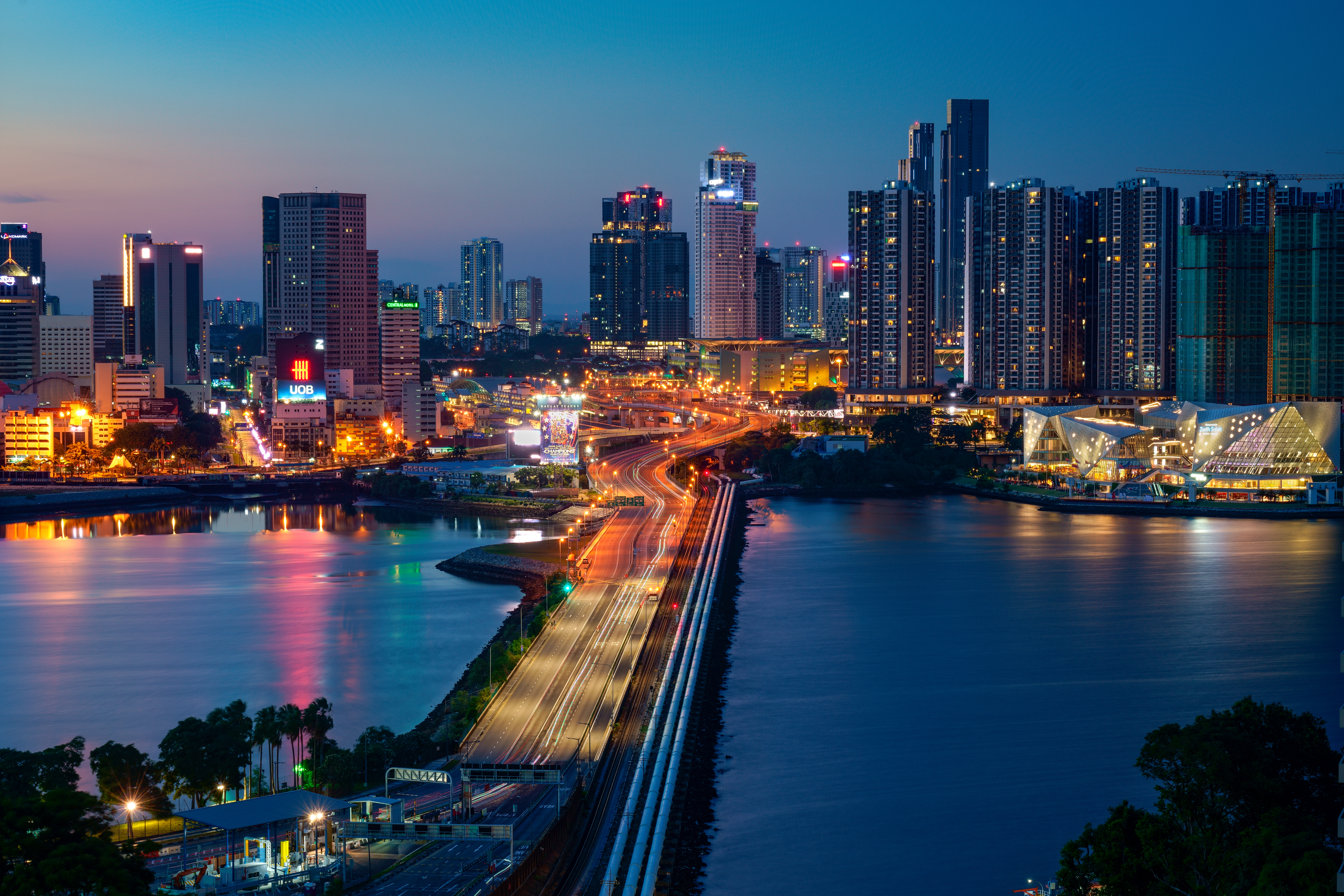
The Johor–Singapore Causeway traverses the Strait of Johor. Johor Bahru is in the background.

== Terminology ==
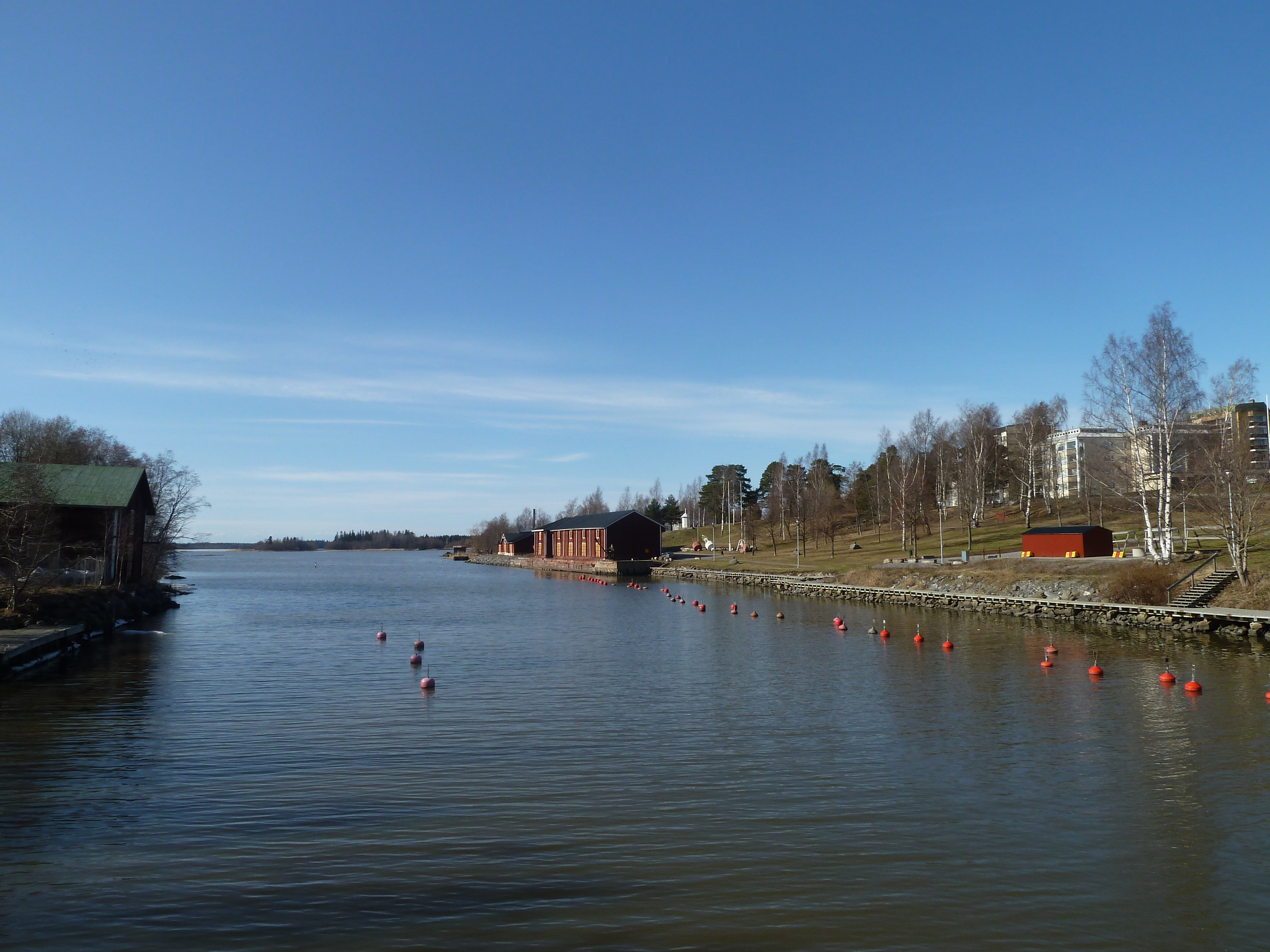
Palosaari Strait (Brändö sund) in Vaasa, Finland

The terms channel, pass, or passage can be synonymous and used interchangeably with strait, although each is sometimes differentiated with varying senses. In Scotland, firth or Kyle are also sometimes used as synonyms for strait.

Many straits are economically important. Straits can be important shipping routes and wars have been fought for control of them.

Numerous artificial channels, called canals, have been constructed to connect two oceans or seas over land, such as the Suez Canal. Although rivers and canals often provide passage between two large lakes, and these seem to suit the formal definition of strait, they are not usually referred to as such. Rivers and often canals, generally have a directional flow tied to changes in elevation, whereas straits often are free flowing in either direction or switch direction, maintaining the same elevation. The term strait is typically reserved for much larger, wider features of the marine environment. There are exceptions, with straits being called canals; Pearse Canal, for example.

== Comparisons ==
Straits are the converse of isthmuses. That is, while a strait lies between two land masses and connects two large areas of ocean, an isthmus lies between two areas of ocean and connects two large land masses.

Some straits have the potential to generate significant tidal power using tidal stream turbines. Tides are more predictable than wave power or wind power. The Pentland Firth (a strait) may be capable of generating 10 GW. Cook Strait in New Zealand may be capable of generating 5.6 GW even though the total energy available in the flow is 15 GW.

== Navigational (legal) regime ==
The regime of transit passage applies in territorial waters (sovereign waters from shore to 12 nautical miles (22 km; 14 mi) out) for straits used for international navigation. These are straits that connect two areas of the high seas or an exclusive economic zone (no navigational exclusions are permitted in either). (Strait of Gibraltar, Strait of Dover, Strait of Hormuz).

The regime of innocent passage applies to all territorial waters (and certain grandfathered internal waters), even if not part of a strait. Many activities not related to passing through (fishing, research, taking on weapons or aircraft, propaganda, espionage) are disallowed, and passing ships are subject to the safety and environmental regulations of the sovereign state.

Innocent passage is needed for international navigation through straits in the territorial waters of one nation, where a trip runs between the territorial sea of a second coastal nation and an area of high seas or an exclusive economic zone (Straits of Tiran, Strait of Juan de Fuca, Strait of Baltiysk).

Innocent passage can also be used to take shortcuts through a strait in territorial waters formed by an offshore island, even if there is an alternate passage around the seaward side of the island. (Strait of Messina, Pentland Firth).

Archipelagic sea lanes passage is available when passing between islands if a country is legally recognized as an archipelagic state.

== See also ==
- Choke point – Critical military pathway
- List of straits
- Strait passage – Concept of the law of the sea

== Bibliography ==
- Longhitano S.G., 2013. A facies-based depositional model for ancient and modern, tectonically–confined tidal straits. Terra Nova, 25,6, 446-452, doi: 10.1111/ter.12055
- Dalrymple, R.W., 2022. A review of the morphology, physical processes and deposits of modern straits. In: Rossi, V.M., Longhitano, S.G., Olariu, C., Chiocci, F.L. (Eds.), Straits and seaways: controls, processes and implications in modern and ancient systems, Geological Society, London, Special Publications, v. 523, p. 17–83, doi: 10.1144/SP523-2021-76.
- Longhitano , S.G., 2025. Tidal strait depositional model revised: Earth-Science Reviews, v. 270, p. 105250, doi: 10.1016/j.earscirev.2025.105250.
