= Tectonic influences on alluvial fans =

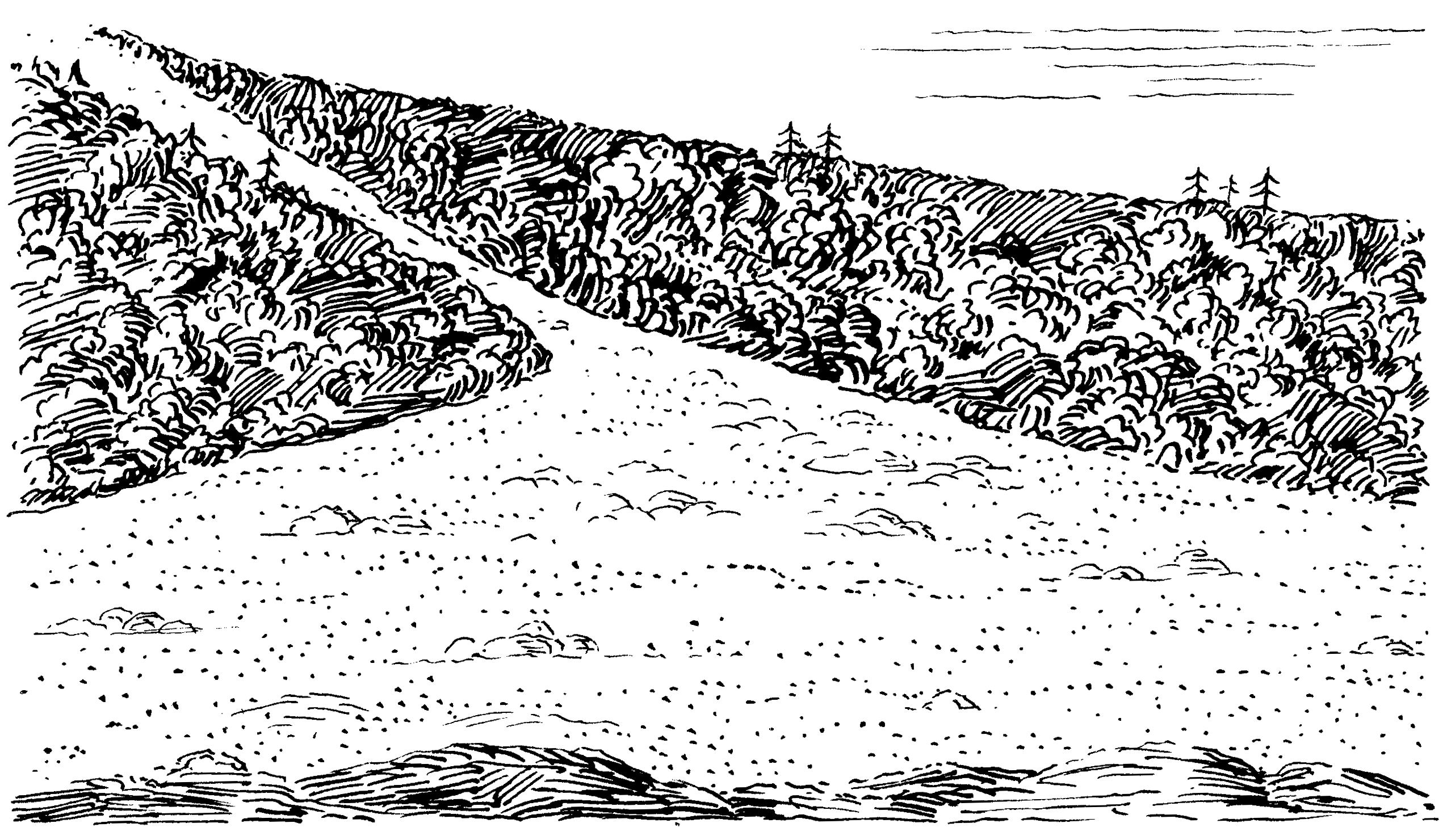
Alluvial fans

Tectonic forces have been shown to have major influences on alluvial fans. Tectonic movements such as tectonic uplift are driving factors in determining the development, shape, structure, size, location, and thickness of alluvial fans and influence the formation of segmented fans. By understanding the tectonic influences, the geologic history (the story of how the area was formed) can be determined by taking information from an alluvial fan and determining the tectonic history of the region.

== Development of fans through tectonic uplift ==
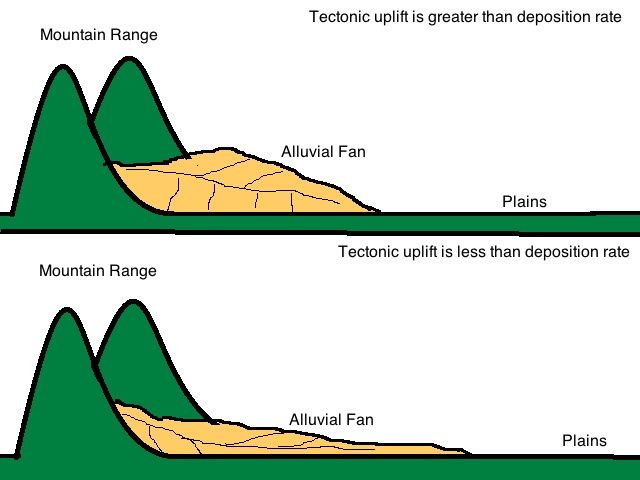
Top: formation of an alluvial fan close to the mountain range due to high tectonic activity. Bottom: formation in a horizontal state due to low tectonic activity.

Alluvial fan development is highly influenced by Tectonic uplift based on the rate of uplift through fan development. As shown in the figure, if tectonic uplift during deposition is greater than the flow of the stream depositing the sediment, then the alluvial fan's deposition will form closer to the mountain range in a more concentrated state. However, if the rate of tectonic uplift is not as significant as the flow of the stream depositing the sediment, this results in a more spread out, flatter alluvial fan which has a greater distance from the mountain range it is formed from.

== Tectonic influence on alluvial fan thickness ==
The thickness of alluvial fans forming due to basin margins are influenced tectonically. If the alluvial fan gets thicker and the grains become more coarse heading up the fan, this indicates that the basin margin is tectonically active and the building of the alluvial fan being more active than the deposition rate. However, if the alluvial fan gets thinner and the grains become more fine heading up the fan, this indicate that the basin margin has no tectonic activity or the tectonic activity is less than the deposition rate or the building of the fan.

== Tectonic influence on alluvial fan shape ==
The shape of alluvial fans is mostly influenced tectonically. An alluvial fan can be completely changed due to orogenic thrusting. An alluvial fan could have been deposited and formed outside of a mountain range, however, thrusting of the mountain belt could cause the alluvial fan to become broken up by the new mountain forming. Thus, the alluvial fan would be split with the fan on either side of the new mountain range development and could change the steepness of the fan. Tectonic uplift could also influence the shape of alluvial fans. If there was major tectonic uplift prior to the deposition of the alluvial fan, the fan would take on a wedge shape with thickest part of the fan near the mountain and would continue to thin out the further from the mountain range. If an alluvial fan is lens shaped that is thin on the ends of the fan and thicker in the middle, this indicates that tectonic uplift occurred during the alluvial fan deposition. Finally, if an alluvial fan is wedge shaped and the fan is thin on the edges and thick in the middle, this indicates that there was little to no tectonic influence on the fan.

== Segmented fans ==
Segmented fans can be described as, "A connection of a series of distinct straight or, less commonly, concave segments that have progressively lower downslopes". Segmented fans are able to be formed through tectonic influences on alluvial fans. One way a segmented fan can be formed is that through an area of rapid tectonic uplift. This can be seen in Provence, France. Streams would then begin to steepen, which would result in the formation of younger and steeper fan segment. This would mean that fan segments would be steeper and younger the more "up fan" you travel. Another way that a segmented fan can be formed through tectonic influences is when there is a low rate of tectonic uplift in an area which then allows the stream to flow at a high rate, resulting in new fan segments that become less steep than the previous segment. This would mean that the fan segments are younger and more horizontal the further you get down the fan.

== Determining geologic history of tectonics using alluvial fans ==
By understanding how alluvial fans react to certain types of tectonic events, it helps geologists build a geologic history of that area. Observations such as shape, thickness, or that alluvial fans are even present gives geologists valuable knowledge to understanding the region that they are studying. The fact that an alluvial fan is present shows that there has been some tectonic activity is the recent past. This is because tectonic changes to the fan allow it to remain active by changing the relief of the fan. It is believed that alluvial fan distribution is a link between the history of a depositional system and the tectonic influences of the area.
