= Alluvial fan =

Fan-shaped deposit of sediment

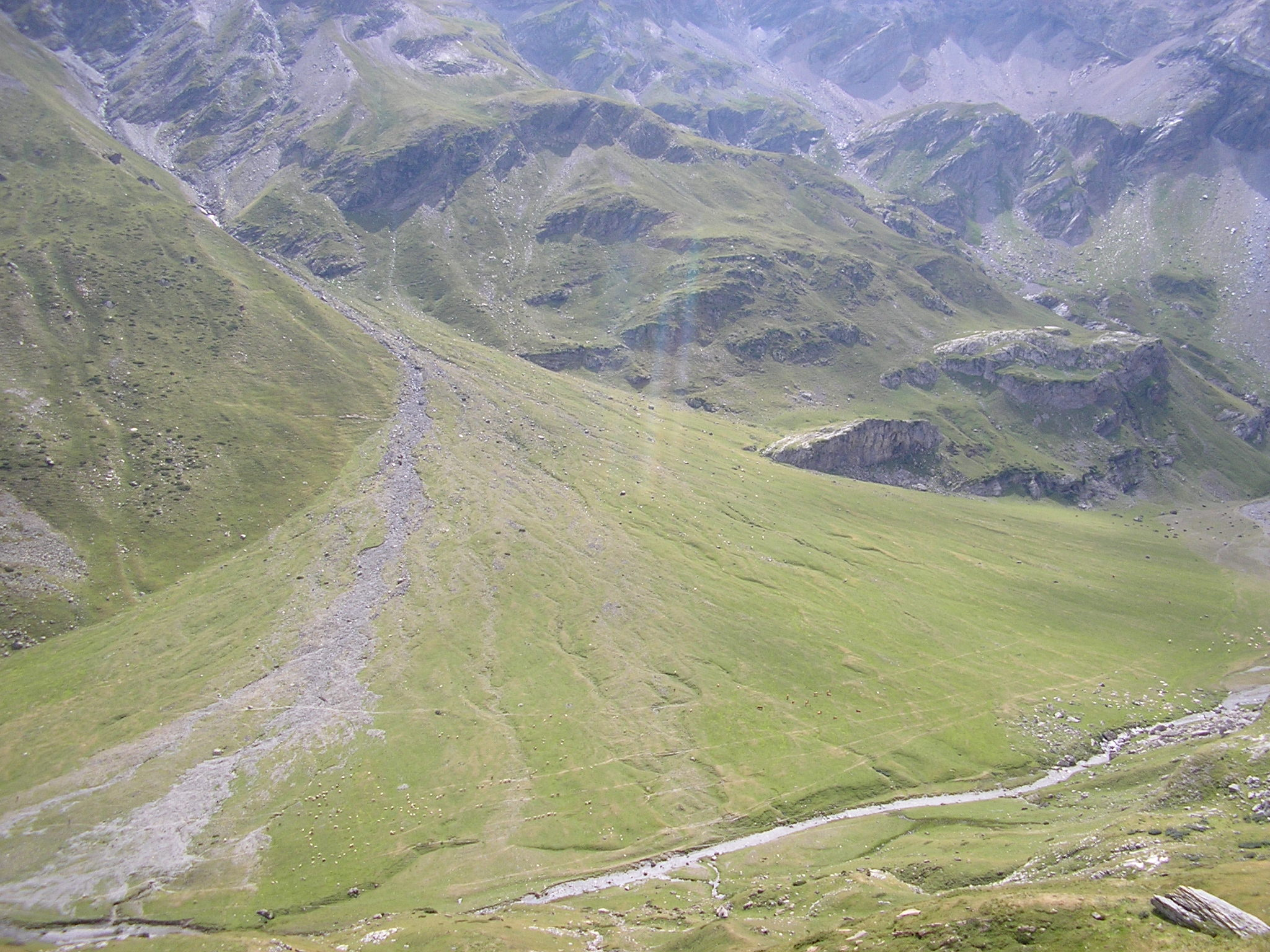
Alluvial fan in the French Pyrenees

An alluvial fan is an accumulation of sediments that fans outwards from a concentrated source of sediments, such as a narrow canyon emerging from an escarpment. They are characteristic of mountainous terrain in arid to semiarid climates, but are also found in more humid environments subject to intense rainfall and in areas of modern glaciation. They range in area from less than 1 square kilometer (0.4 sq mi) to almost 20,000 square kilometers (7,700 sq mi).

Alluvial fans typically form where a flow of sediment or rocks emerge from a confined channel and are suddenly free to spread out in many directions. For example, many alluvial fans form when steep mountain valleys meet a flat plain. The transition from a narrow channel to a wide open area reduces the carrying capacity of flow and results in deposition of sediments. The flow can take the form of infrequent debris flows like in a landslide, or can be carried by an intermittent stream or creek.

The reduction of flow is key to the formation of alluvial fans. If a river exits a mountain valley without any reduction in flow, it is more common to see the formation of an alluvial plain. The steepness of an alluvial formation depends on how much flow decreases when entering flat ground as sediment will be deposited further away from its source if river flow is high.

Alluvial fans are most commonly found at the foot of desert mountains, such as in the Great Basin of western North America, in the New Red Sandstone of south Devon, or all across the major population centers of Xinjiang in the Taklamakan Desert and Junggar Basin.

Alluvial fans are not unique to Earth, as they are simply a result of gravity and geometry, and thus have also been found abundantly on Mars and Titan, showing that fluvial processes have occurred on other worlds.

Some of the largest alluvial fans are found along the Himalaya mountain front on the Indo-Gangetic Plain. A shift of the feeder channel (a nodal avulsion) can lead to catastrophic flooding, as occurred on the Kosi River fan in 2008.

== Description ==
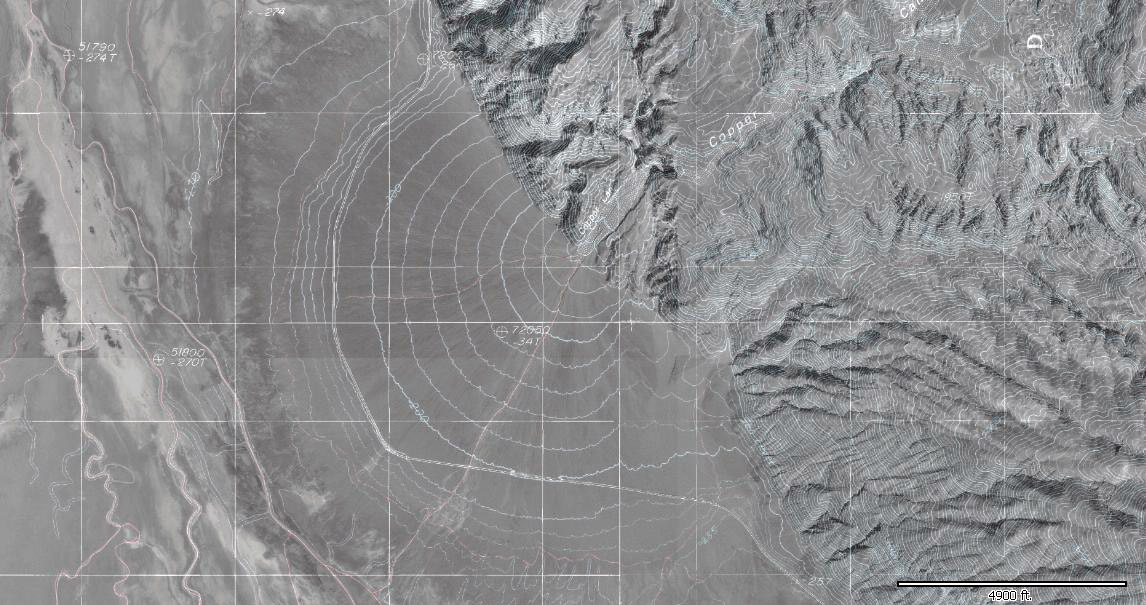
Alluvial fan in Death Valley

An alluvial fan is an accumulation of sediments that fans out from a concentrated source of sediments, such as a narrow canyon emerging from an escarpment. This accumulation is shaped like a section of a shallow cone, with its apex at the source of sediments.

Alluvial fans vary greatly in size, from only a few meters across at the base to as much as 150 kilometers across, with a slope of 1.5 to 25 degrees. Some giant alluvial fans have areas of almost 20,000 square kilometres (7,700 sq mi). The slope measured from the apex is generally concave, with the steepest slope near the apex (the proximal fan or fanhead) and becoming less steep further out (the medial fan or midfan) and shallowing at the edges of the fan (the distal fan or outer fan). Sieve deposits, which are lobes of coarse gravel, may be present on the proximal fan. The sediments in an alluvial fan are usually coarse and poorly sorted, with the coarsest sediments found on the proximal fan.

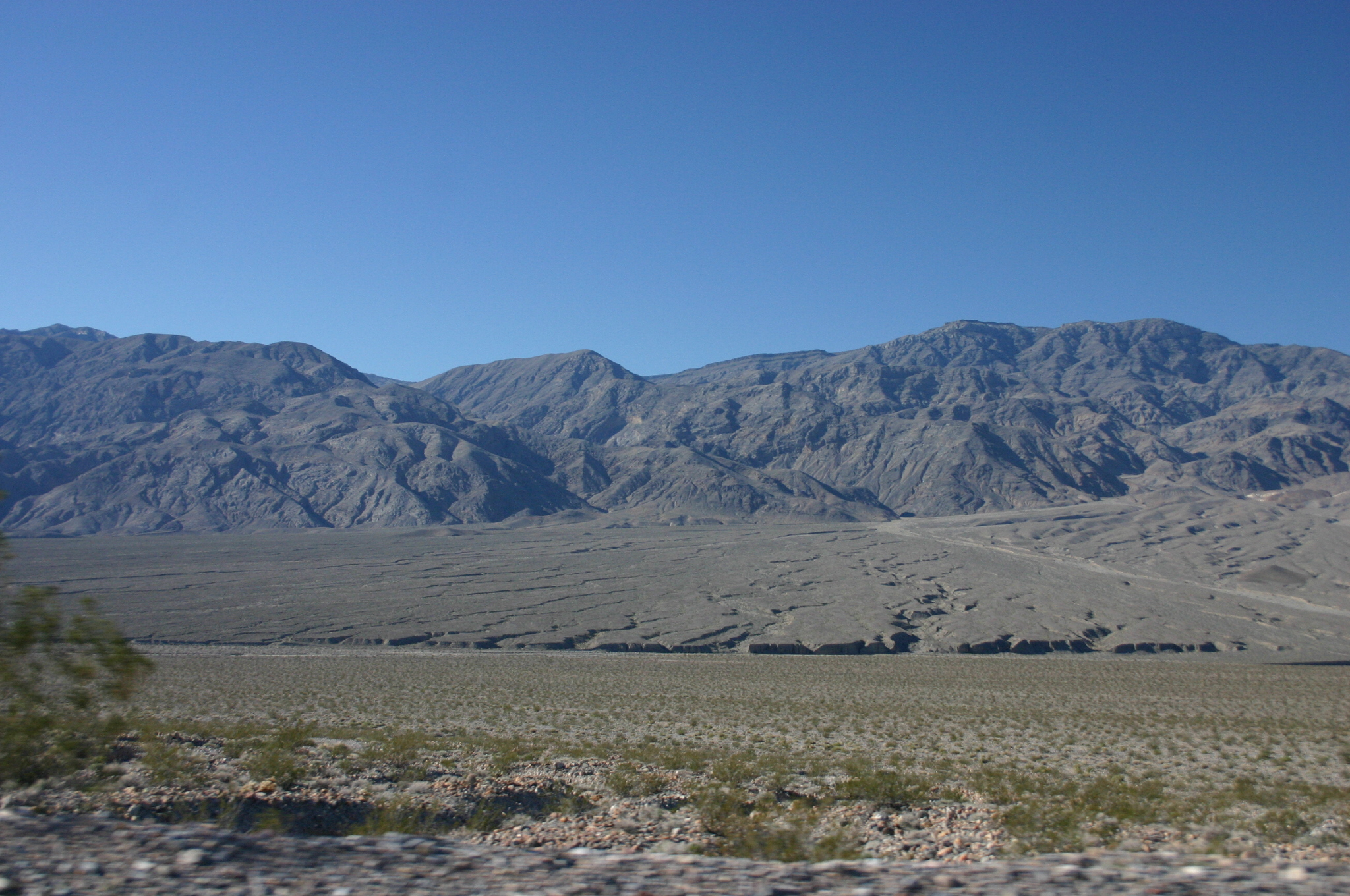
Large alluvial fan in Death Valley showing a "toe-trimmed" profile

When there is enough space in the alluvial plain for all of the sediment deposits to fan out without contacting other valley walls or rivers, an unconfined alluvial fan develops. Unconfined alluvial fans allow sediments to naturally fan out, and the shape of the fan is not influenced by other topological features. When the alluvial plain is more restricted, so that the fan comes into contact with topographic barriers, a confined fan is formed.

Wave or channel erosion of the edge of the fan (lateral erosion) sometimes produces a "toe-trimmed" fan, in which the edge of the fan is marked by a small escarpment. Toe-trimmed fans may record climate changes or tectonic processes, and the process of lateral erosion may enhance the aquifer or petroleum reservoir potential of the fan. Toe-trimmed fans on the planet Mars provide evidence of past river systems.

When numerous rivers and streams exit a mountain front onto a plain, the fans can combine to form a continuous apron. This is referred to as a bajada or piedmont alluvial plain.

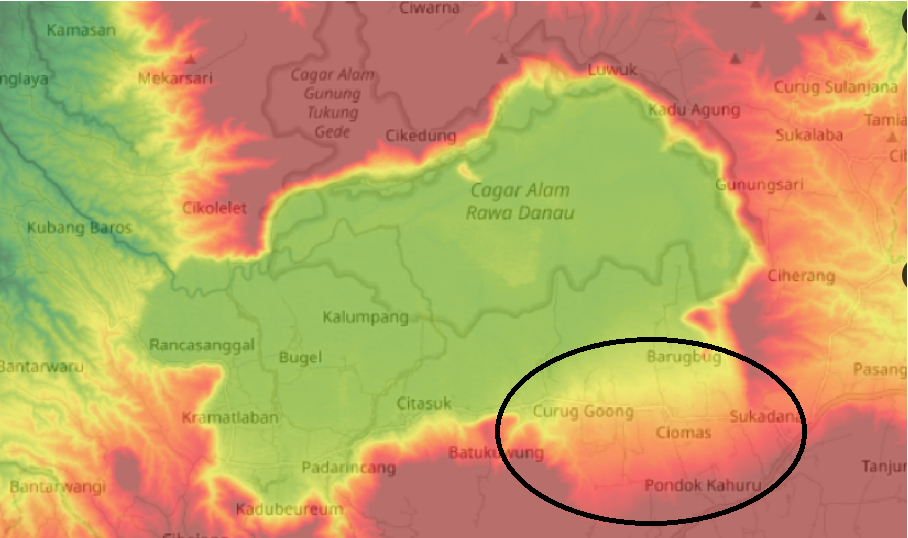
Topographic map of an alluvial fan near Rawa Danau Caldera, West Java, Indonesia

== Formation ==
Alluvial fans usually form where a confined feeder channel exits a mountain front or a glacier margin. As the flow exits the feeder channel onto the fan surface, it is able to spread out into wide, shallow channels or to infiltrate the surface. This reduces the carrying power of the flow and results in deposition of sediments.

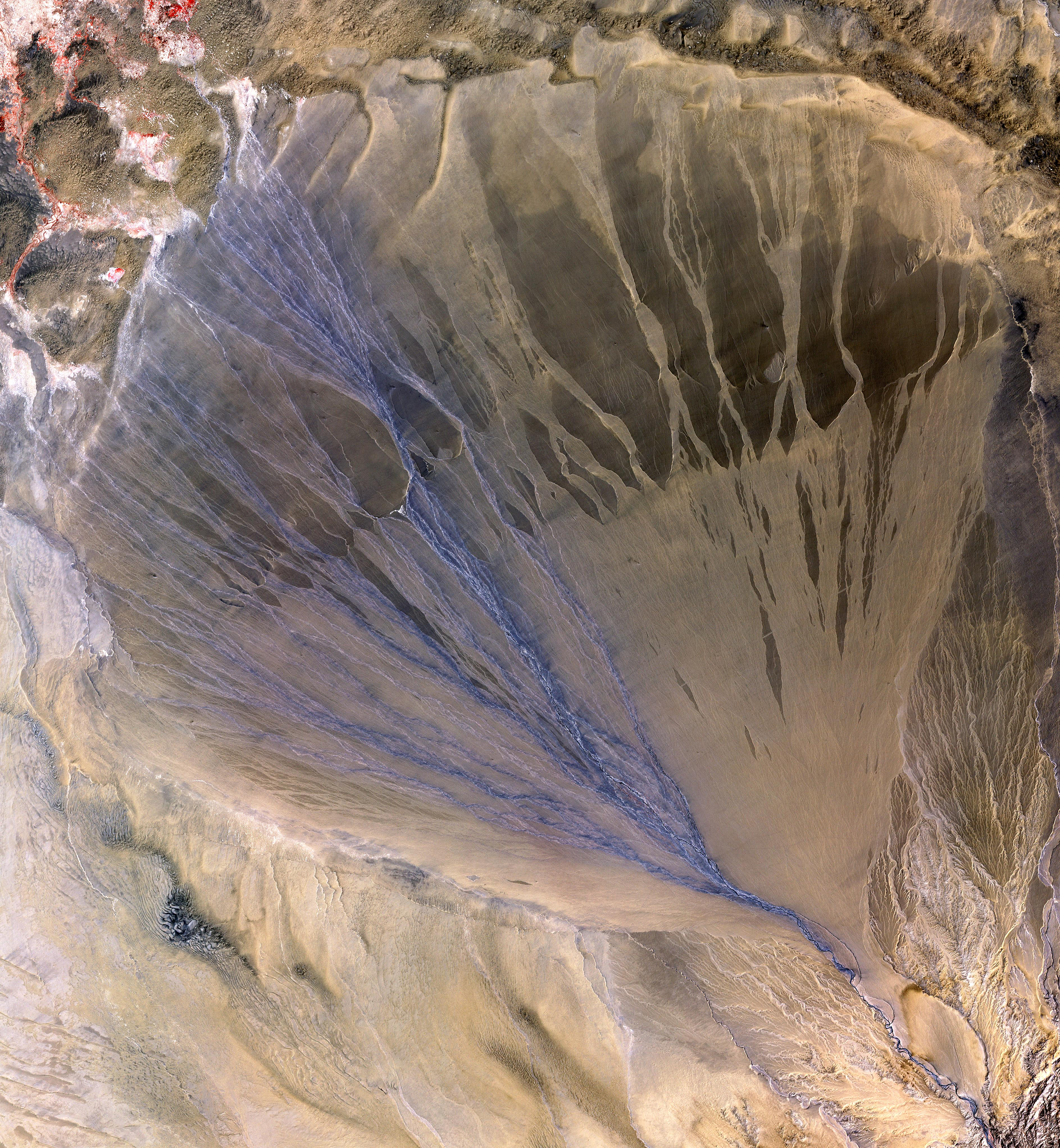
Alluvial fan in the Taklamakan Desert in Xinjiang showing active left and inactive right sectors

Flow in the proximal fan, where the slope is steepest, is usually confined to a single channel (a fanhead trench), which may be up to 30 meters (100 ft) deep. This channel is subject to blockage by accumulated sediments or debris flows, which causes flow to periodically break out of its old channel (nodal avulsion) and shift to a part of the fan with a steeper gradient, where deposition resumes. As a result, normally only part of the fan is active at any particular time, and the bypassed areas may undergo soil formation or erosion.

Alluvial fans can be dominated by debris flows (debris flow fans) or stream flow (fluvial fans). Which kind of fan is formed is controlled by climate, tectonics, and the type of bedrock in the area feeding the flow onto the fan.

=== Debris flow ===
Debris flow fans receive most of their sediments in the form of debris flows. Debris flows are slurry-like mixtures of water and particles of all sizes, from clay to boulders, that resemble wet concrete. They are characterized by having a yield strength, meaning that they are highly viscous at low flow velocities but become less viscous as the flow velocity increases. This means that a debris flow can come to a halt while still on moderately tilted ground. The flow then becomes consolidated under its own weight.

Debris flow fans occur in all climates but are more common where the source rock is mudstone or matrix-rich saprolite rather than coarser, more permeable regolith. The abundance of fine-grained sediments encourages the initial hillslope failure and subsequent cohesive flow of debris. Saturation of clay-rich colluvium by locally intense thunderstorms initiates slope failure. The resulting debris flow travels down the feeder channel and onto the surface of the fan.

Debris flow fans have a network of mostly inactive distributary channels in the upper fan that gives way to mid- to lower-level lobes. The channels tend to be filled by subsequent cohesive debris flows. Usually only one lobe is active at a time, and inactive lobes may develop desert varnish or develop a soil profile from eolian dust deposition, on time scales of 1,000 to 10,000 years. Because of their high viscosity, debris flows tend to be confined to the proximal and medial fan even in a debris-flow-dominated alluvial fan, and streamfloods dominate the distal fan. However, some debris-flow-dominated fans in arid climates consist almost entirely of debris flows and lag gravels from eolian winnowing of debris flows, with no evidence of sheetflood or sieve deposits. Debris-flow-dominated fans tend to be steep and poorly vegetated.

=== Fluvial ===
Fluvial fans (streamflow-dominated fans) receive most of their sediments in the form of stream flow rather than debris flows. They are less sharply distinguished from ordinary fluvial deposits than are debris flow fans.

Fluvial fans occur where there is perennial, seasonal, or ephemeral stream flow that feeds a system of distributary channels on the fan. In arid or semiarid climates, deposition is dominated by infrequent but intense rainfall that produces flash floods in the feeder channel. This results in sheetfloods on the alluvial fan, where sediment-laden water leaves its channel confines and spreads across the fan surface. These may include hyperconcentrated flows containing 20% to 45% sediments, which are intermediate between sheetfloods having 20% or less of sediments and debris flows with more than 45% sediments. As the flood recedes, it often leaves a lag of gravel deposits that have the appearance of a network of braided streams.

Where the flow is more continuous, as with spring snow melt, incised-channel flow in channels 1–4 meters (3–10 ft) high takes place in a network of braided streams. Such alluvial fans tend to have a shallower slope but can become enormous. The Kosi and other fans along the Himalaya mountain front in the Indo-Gangetic plain are examples of gigantic stream-flow-dominated alluvial fans, sometimes described as megafans. Here, continued movement on the Main Boundary Thrust over the last ten million years has focused the drainage of 750 kilometres (470 miles) of mountain frontage into just three enormous fans.

== Geologic record ==
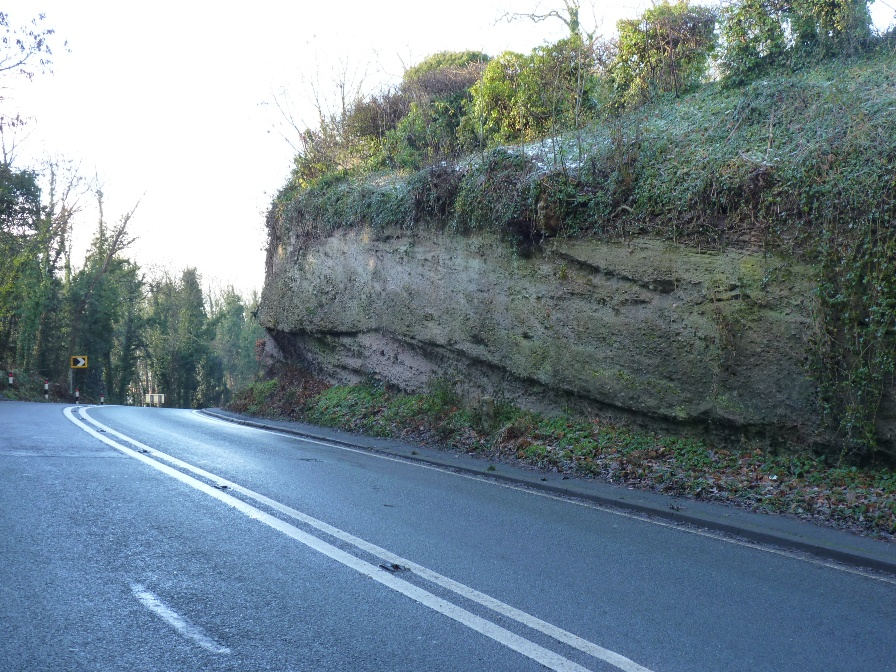
Pebble bed in the New Red Sandstone

Alluvial fans are common in the geologic record, but may have been particularly important before the evolution of land plants in the mid-Paleozoic. They are characteristic of fault-bounded basins and can be 5,000 meters (16,000 ft) or thicker due to tectonic subsidence of the basin and uplift of the mountain front. Most are red from hematite produced by diagenetic alteration of iron-rich minerals in a shallow, oxidizing environment. Examples of paleofans include the Triassic basins of eastern North America and the New Red Sandstone of south Devon, the Devonian Hornelen Basin of Norway, and the Devonian-Carboniferous in the Gaspé Peninsula of Canada. Such fan deposit likely contain the largest accumulations of gravel in the geologic record.

=== Depositional facies ===
Several kinds of sediment deposits (facies) are found in alluvial fans.

Alluvial fans are characterized by coarse sedimentation, though the sediments making up the fan become less coarse further from the apex. Gravels show well-developed imbrication with the pebbles dipping towards the apex. Fan deposits typically show well-developed reverse grading caused by outbuilding of the fan: Finer sediments are deposited at the edge of the fan, but as the fan continues to grow, increasingly coarse sediments are deposited on top of the earlier, less coarse sediments. However, a few fans show normal grading indicating inactivity or even fan retreat, so that increasingly fine sediments are deposited on earlier coarser sediments. Normal or reverse grading sequences can be hundreds to thousands of meters in thickness. Depositional facies that have been reported for alluvial fans include debris flows, sheet floods and upper regime stream floods, sieve deposits, and braided stream flows, each leaving their own characteristic sediment deposits that can be identified by geologists.

Debris flow deposits are common in the proximal and medial fan. These deposits lack sedimentary structure, other than occasional reverse-graded bedding towards the base, and they are poorly sorted. The proximal fan may also include gravel lobes that have been interpreted as sieve deposits, where runoff rapidly infiltrates and leaves behind only the coarse material. However, the gravel lobes have also been interpreted as debris flow deposits. Conglomerate originating as debris flows on alluvial fans is described as fanglomerate.

Stream flow deposits tend to be sheetlike, better sorted than debris flow deposits, and sometimes show well-developed sedimentary structures such as cross-bedding. These are more prevalent in the medial and distal fan. In the distal fan, where channels are very shallow and braided, stream flow deposits consist of sandy interbeds with planar and trough slanted stratification. The medial fan of a streamflow-dominated alluvial fan shows nearly the same depositional facies as ordinary fluvial environments, so that identification of ancient alluvial fans must be based on radial paleomorphology in a piedmont setting.

== Occurrences ==
Alluvial fans are characteristic of mountainous terrain in arid to semiarid climates, but are also found in more humid environments subject to intense rainfall and in areas of modern glaciation. They have also been found on other bodies of the Solar System.

=== Terrestrial ===
Alluvial fans are built in response to erosion induced by tectonic uplift. The upwards coarsening of the beds making up the fan reflects cycles of erosion in the highlands that feed sediments to the fan. However, climate and changes in base level may be as important as tectonic uplift. For example, alluvial fans in the Himalayas show older fans entrenched and overlain by younger fans. The younger fans, in turn, are cut by deep incised valleys showing two terrace levels. Dating via optically stimulated luminescence suggests a hiatus of 70,000 to 80,000 years between the old and new fans, with evidence of tectonic tilting at 45,000 years ago and an end to fan deposition 20,000 years ago. Both the hiatus and the more recent end to fan deposition are thought to be connected to periods of enhanced southwest monsoon precipitation. Climate has also influenced fan formation in Death Valley, California, US, where dating of beds suggests that peaks of fan deposition during the last 25,000 years occurred during times of rapid climate change, both from wet to dry and from dry to wet.

Alluvial fans are often found in desert areas, which are subjected to periodic flash floods from nearby thunderstorms in local hills. The typical watercourse in an arid climate has a large, funnel-shaped basin at the top, leading to a narrow defile, which opens out into an alluvial fan at the bottom. Multiple braided streams are usually present and active during water flows.

Alluvial fans also develop in wetter climates when high-relief terrain is located adjacent to low-relief terrain. In Nepal, the Koshi River has built a megafan covering some 15,000 km^{2} (5,800 sq mi) below its exit from Himalayan foothills onto the nearly level plains where the river traverses into India before joining the Ganges. Along the upper Koshi tributaries, tectonic forces elevate the Himalayas several millimeters annually. Uplift is approximately in equilibrium with erosion, so the river annually carries some 100 million cubic meters (3.5×10^{9} ft^{3}) of sediment as it exits the mountains. Deposition of this magnitude over millions of years is more than sufficient to account for the megafan.

In North America, streams flowing into California's Central Valley have deposited smaller but still extensive alluvial fans, such as that of the Kings River flowing out of the Sierra Nevada. Like the Himalayan megafans, these are streamflow-dominated fans.

=== Extraterrestrial ===
==== Mars ====
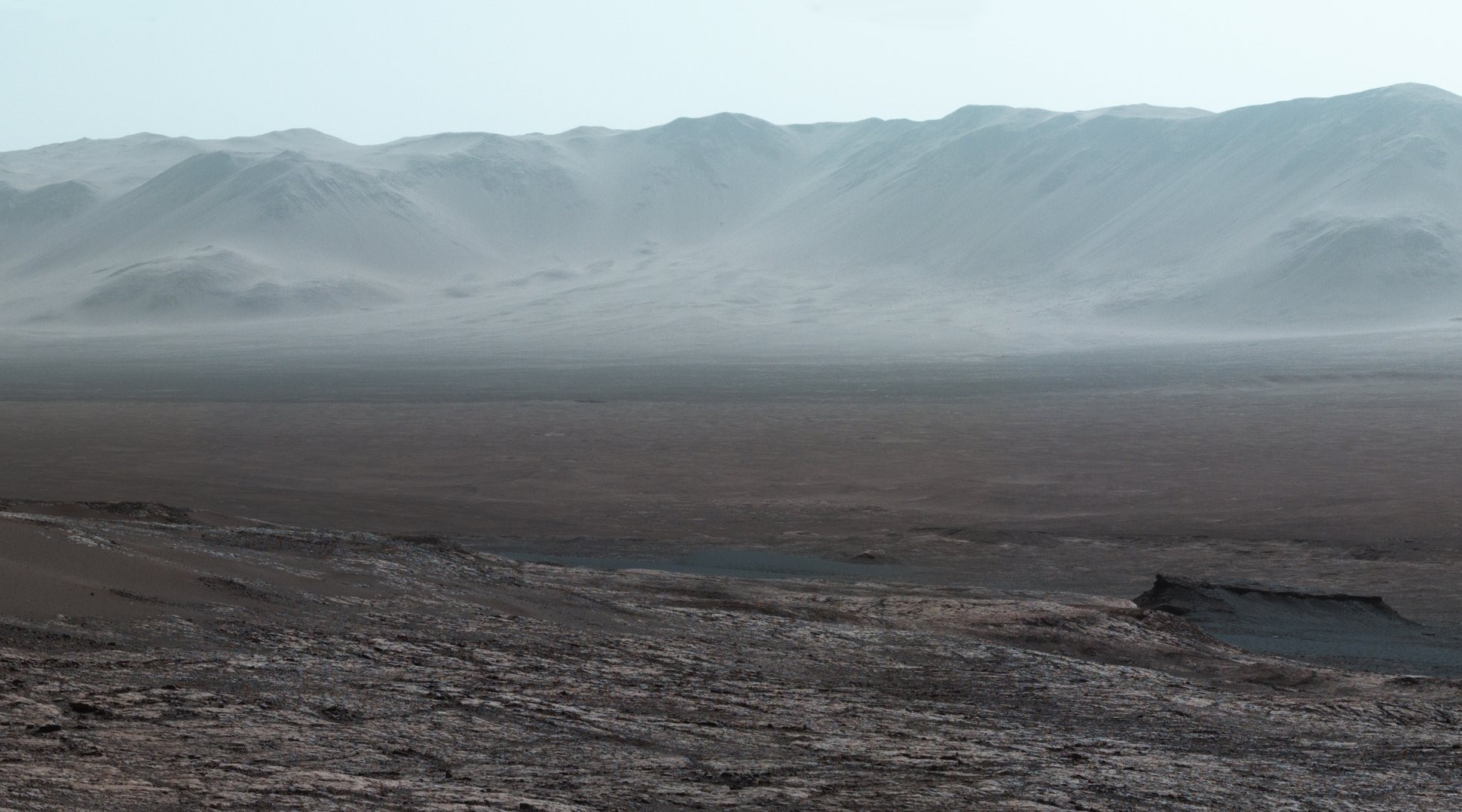
Large alluvial fan at the base of the rim of Gale crater, Mars

Alluvial fans are also found on Mars. Unlike alluvial fans on Earth, those on Mars are rarely associated with tectonic processes, but are much more common on crater rims. The crater rim alluvial fans appear to have been deposited by sheetflow rather than debris flows.

Three alluvial fans have been found in Saheki Crater. These fans confirmed past fluvial flow on the planet and further supported the theory that liquid water was once present in some form on the Martian surface. In addition, observations of fans in Gale crater made by satellites from orbit have now been confirmed by the discovery of fluvial sediments by the Curiosity rover. Alluvial fans in Holden crater have toe-trimmed profiles attributed to fluvial erosion.

The few alluvial fans associated with tectonic processes include those at Coprates Chasma and Juventae Chasma, which are part of the Valles Marineris canyon system. These provide evidence of the existence and nature of faulting in this region of Mars.

==== Titan ====
Alluvial fans have been observed by the Cassini-Huygens mission on Titan using the Cassini orbiter's synthetic aperture radar instrument. These fans are more common in the drier mid-latitudes at the end of methane/ethane rivers where it is thought that frequent wetting and drying occur due to precipitation, much like arid fans on Earth. Radar imaging suggests that fan material is most likely composed of round grains of water ice or solid organic compounds about two centimeters in diameter.

== Impact on humans ==
Alluvial fans are the most important groundwater reservoirs in many regions. Many urban, industrial, and agricultural areas are located on alluvial fans, including the conurbations of Los Angeles, California; Salt Lake City, Utah; and Denver, Colorado, in the western United States, and in many other parts of the world. However, flooding on alluvial fans poses unique problems for disaster prevention and preparation.

=== Aquifers ===
The beds of coarse sediments associated with alluvial fans form aquifers that are the most important groundwater reservoirs in many regions. These include both arid regions, such as Egypt or Iraq, and humid regions, such as central Europe or Taiwan.

=== Flood hazards ===
Alluvial fans are subject to infrequent but often very damaging flooding, whose unusual characteristics distinguish alluvial fan floods from ordinary riverbank flooding. These include great uncertainty in the likely flood path, the likelihood of abrupt deposition and erosion of sediments carried by the flood from upstream sources, and a combination of the availability of sediments and of the slope and topography of the fan that creates extraordinary hazards. These hazards cannot reliably be mitigated by elevation on fill (raising existing buildings up to a meter (three feet) and building new foundations beneath them). At a minimum, major structural flood control measures are required to mitigate risk, and in some cases, the only alternative is to restrict development on the fan surface. Such measures can be politically controversial, particularly since the hazard is not obvious to property owners. In the United States, areas at risk of alluvial fan flooding are marked as Zone AO on flood insurance rate maps.

Alluvial fan flooding commonly takes the form of short (several hours) but energetic flash floods that occur with little or no warning. They typically result from heavy and prolonged rainfall, and are characterized by high velocities and capacity for sediment transport. Flows cover the range from floods through hyperconcentrated flows to debris flows, depending on the volume of sediments in the flow. Debris flows resemble freshly poured concrete, consisting mostly of coarse debris. Hyperconcentrated flows are intermediate between floods and debris flows, with a water content between 40 and 80 weight percent. Floods may transition to hyperconcentrated flows as they entrain sediments, while debris flows may become hyperconcentrated flows if they are diluted by water. Because flooding on alluvial fans carries large quantities of sediment, channels can rapidly become blocked, creating great uncertainty about flow paths that magnifies the dangers.

Alluvial fan flooding in the Apennine Mountains of Italy have resulted in repeated loss of life. A flood on 1 October 1581 at Piedimonte Matese resulted in the loss of 400 lives. Loss of life from alluvial fan floods continued into the 19th century, and the hazard of alluvial fan flooding remains a concern in Italy.

On January 1, 1934, record rainfall in a recently burned area of the San Gabriel Mountains, California, caused severe flooding of the alluvial fan on which the towns of Montrose and Glendale were built. The floods caused significant loss of life and property.

The Koshi River in India has built up a megafan where it exits the Himalayas onto the Ganges plain. The river has a history of frequently and capriciously changing its course, so that it has been called the Sorrow of Bihar for contributing disproportionately to India's death tolls in flooding. These exceed those of all countries except Bangladesh. Over the last few hundred years, the river had generally shifted westward across its fan, and by 2008, the main river channel was located on the extreme western part of the megafan. In August 2008, high monsoon flows breached the embankment of the Koshi River. This diverted most of the river into an unprotected ancient channel and flooded the central part of the megafan. This was an area with a high population density that had been stable for over 200 years. Over a million people were rendered homeless, about a thousand lost their lives and thousands of hectares of crops were destroyed.

=== Petroleum reservoirs ===
Buried alluvial fans are sometimes found at the margins of petroleum basins. Debris flow fans make poor petroleum reservoirs, but fluvial fans are potentially significant reservoirs. Though fluvial fans are typically of poorer quality than reservoirs closer to the basin center, due to their complex structure, the episodic flooding channels of the fans are potentially lucrative targets for petroleum exploration. Alluvial fans that experience toe-trimming (lateral erosion) by an axial river (a river running the length of an escarpment-bounded basin) may have increased potential as reservoirs. The river deposits relatively porous, permeable axial river sediments that alternate with fan sediment beds.

== See also ==
- Alluvium – Loose soil or sediment that is eroded and redeposited in a non-marine setting
- Floodplain – Land adjacent to a water body which is flooded during periods of high water
- Placer deposit – Accumulation of valuable minerals formed by gravity separation
- River delta – Silt deposition landform at the mouth of a river
- Subaqueous fan – Type of sediment deposit
- Tectonic influences on alluvial fans
- Depositional environment
