= Deltaic lobe =

Chart displaying the different classifications of river deltas lobes

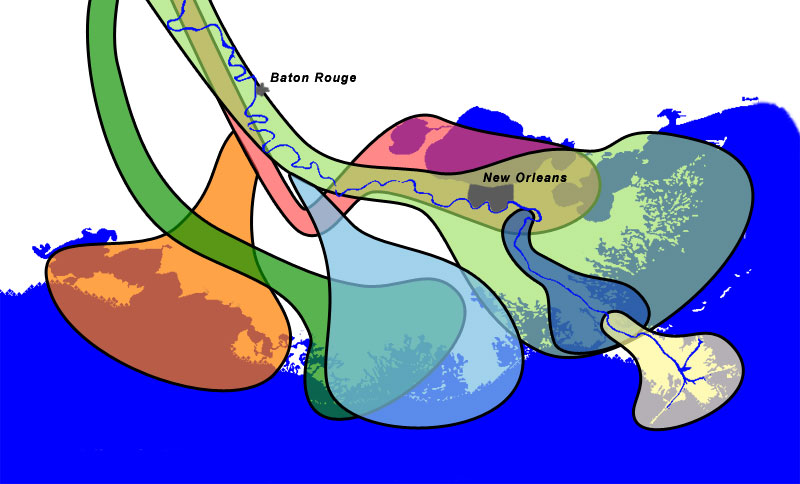
Delta lobes in the Mississippi River Delta. Each lobe was the primary outlet for a while, but was abandoned when the flow shifted. 4600 yrs BP 3500 yrs BP 2800 yrs BP 1000 yrs BP 300 yrs BP 500 yrs BP current

A deltaic lobe is a wetland formation that forms as a river empties water and sediment into other bodies of water. As the sediment builds up from this delta, the river will break away from its single channel and the mouth will be pushed outwards, forming a deltaic lobe.

When the rate of water discharge and lobe progradation are sufficiently high, a river can form a deltaic lobe. A single deltaic lobe includes a network of shallow channels called distributaries that make up a distributary network that branches off from the mainstream of the river. These networks can be the blueprint for a future progradational deltaic lobe when the initial deltaic lobe is abandoned. As the deltaic lobe progresses, heavier and coarser sediments settle first. As heavier sediments are deposited at the top of the deltaic lobe, smaller and finer sediments get deposited out, creating the beginning of a deltaic fan. When the alluvium, the smallest sediment carried by the deltaic lobe, is deposited and new land is formed, the resulting formation is considered a delta.

Lobes are important in forming river deltas over time by amalgamation of channel avulsions. When a lobe is prograded the frequency of avulsion decreases, and the avulsion length increases relative to a non-progradational deltaic lobe. As the deltaic lobe progrades, the channel bed gradient is lowered, resulting in a sedimentary push upstream. This shifts the location of the avulsion forwards creating a completed deltaic lobe on which overlies a delta. Lobe formation is determined by a relationship between water discharge and lobe progradation. A model must take into account both factors in order to accurately predict avulsion timing and location.

== Types ==
=== Wave-dominated deltaic lobes ===
The heavily-populated Nile Delta, showing an arcuate margin shaped by longshore drift

In wave-dominated settings the number of created deltaic lobes is limited by the number of distributaries. Lobes are rarely distinguished from one another in high tide settings as tidal currents favor channel stability and suppress avulsions. The Nile, for example, is considered to be an arcuate delta because of its arc shaping. As it is waves that shape it into an arc, it also falls under the category of a wave-dominated delta.

The word delta is derived from the Greek letter delta, which, like arcuate deltas, is roughly triangular.

=== Tide-dominated deltaic lobes ===
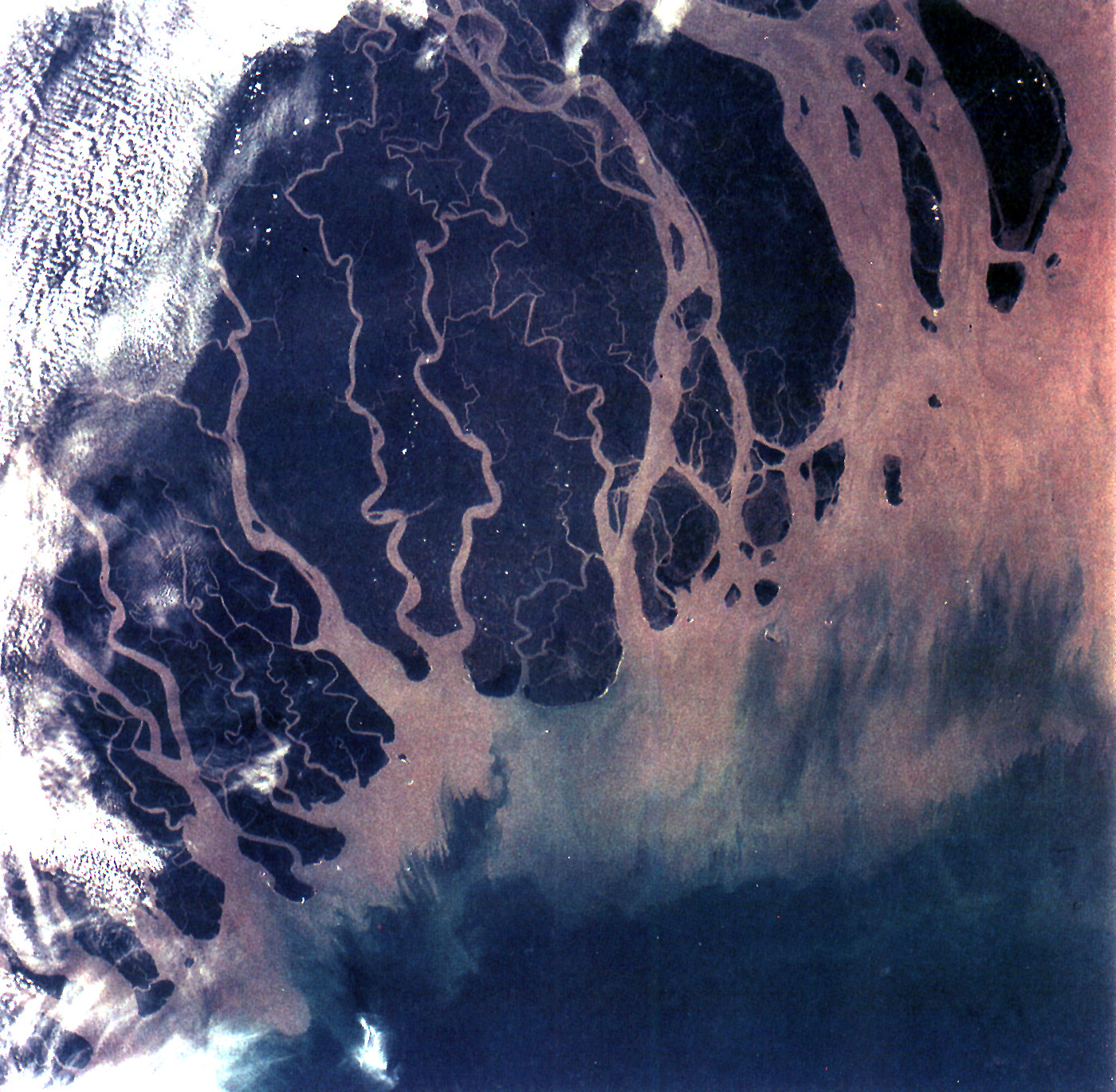
The Ganges Delta has channels primarily cut by tides and storm surges.

Tide dominated deltaic lobes are defined by high levels of sediment transfer, low numbers of distributaries, and the possible creation of tidal dominated fluvial structures such as sandbars. This high level of sediment transfer can be attributed to the tidally generated water movements that control the levels of water flux on the system, and to a lesser extent the increase of river discharge and local precipitation. All created channels are widened by the incoming and outgoing tide but the water depth does not increase significantly so the tidal deltaic lobe progrades further sea-word creating multiple distributaries and a flooding effect.

One example of a tide-dominated deltaic lobe system is the Han River delta in Korea. The Han River delta is shaped by its tidal changes in the summer and winter as well as its shallow and steep basins.

=== River-Dominated deltaic lobes ===
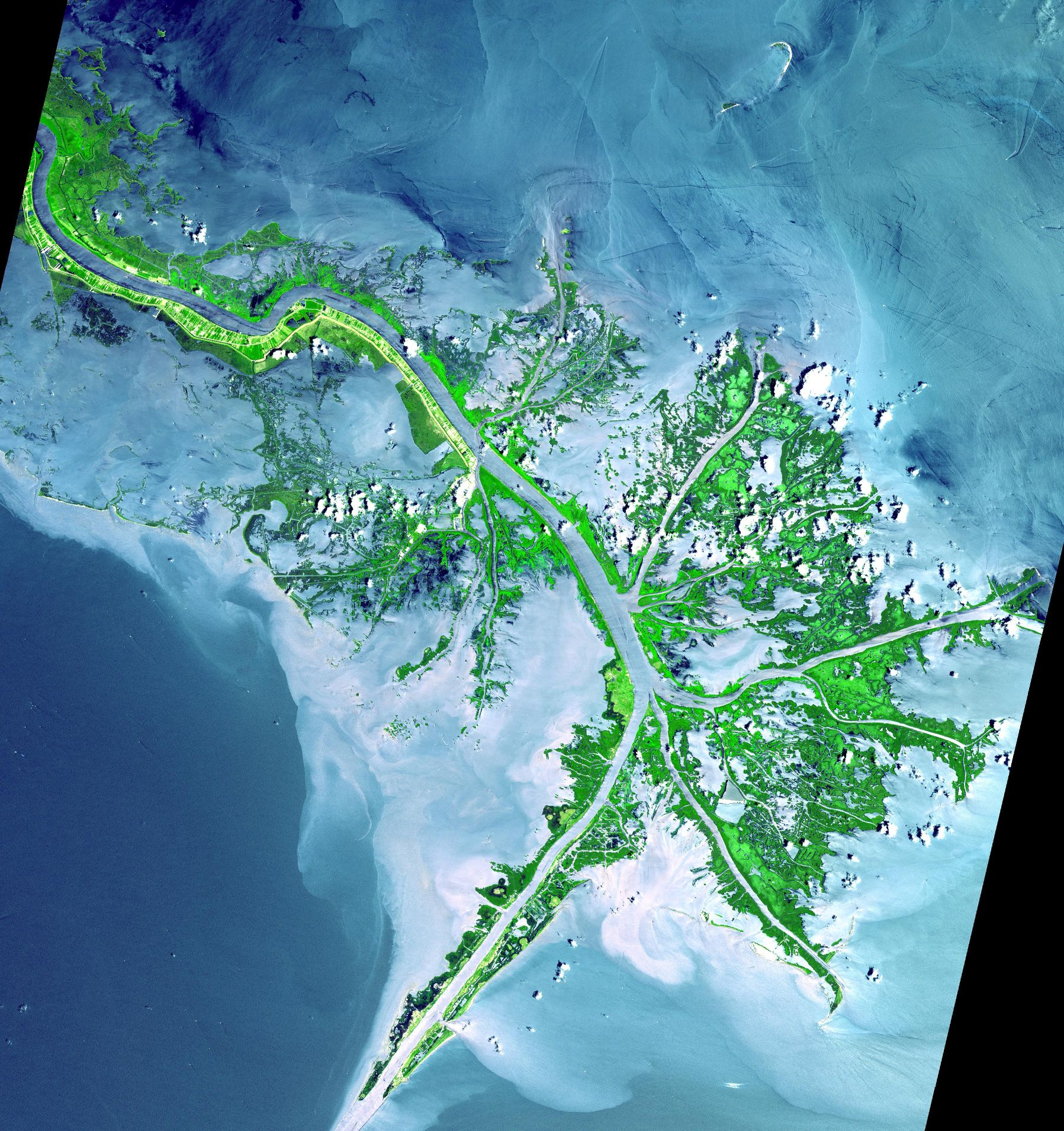
This part of the Mississippi River Delta is a classic river-dominated delta. Specifically, the Mississippi River Delta has a bird-foot shape. Sediment is deposited along the margins of the current, extending the delta; the sea conditions in the Gulf of Mexico allow sediment to accumulate without greatly rearranging it.

River Dominated deltaic lobes are defined by having long "elongate" shapes, river channels bounded by natural levees, and high amount of distributaries. The Mississippi River delta (see lede image) is made up of six subdeltas, which in turn are made up of 16 individual lobes. Individual lobes in multilobe deltas can be vastly different from one another. Lobes are sequentially abandoned; the overly extended seaward lobe silts up, and the river finds another outlet that is shorter and more direct. This sequential channel abandonment causes the deltaic plain to grow, creating a bird's foot delta composed of many deltaic lobes.

Each major deltaic lobe is composed of complex non-detrital sediments indigenous to the basin of deposition. A change in sediment supply is responsible not only for the abandonment of a deltaic lobe, but also the coastal retreat and reaccumulation of sediments over the detrital lens.

=== Cuspate deltaic lobes ===
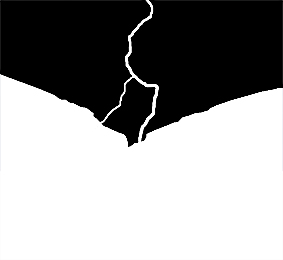
Outline of the Tiber River Delta

A cuspate deltaic lobe involves the creation and subsequent abandonment of deltaic lobe cusps to create unique linear delta formations. The cuspate deltaic lobe is defined by its abrupt rate of discharge from river to body of water, and the creation of multiple cusp systems built up into separate but active distributaries.

One such example of a cuspate delta is the Tiber River delta of Italy. The river was formed first as a deltaic lobe cusp prograded from the river mouth. An abrupt southward migration of the river mouth left the first cusp abandoned and a new deltaic lobe prograded. Finally, the two distributary channels formed one deltaic formation running through the city center.

=== Gilbert deltaic lobes ===
Gilbert deltaic lobes are defined by their movement of coarse-grained materials, relatively large sizes, and steep slopes into basins. This rise in level commonly results in intensified aggradation and eventual decrease in topset slope. The most well documented example of Gilbert deltaic lobes is at the Gilbert delta of Lake Bonneville.
