= Subaqueous fan =

Type of sediment deposit

A subaqueous fan is a fan-shaped deposit formed beneath water (similar to deltas or terrestrial alluvial fans), that is commonly related to glaciers and crater lakes.

Subaqueous fan deposits are generally described as coarse to fine gravel and/or sand, with variable texture and sorting. Underflows (meltwater denser than lake water) tend to produce subaqueous fans with channels and levees. Subaqueous fans can be formed by the influence of glacier movement and by underwater currents typically found at a river delta. The sediment size and composition that makes up the subaqueous fan is dependent on the type of rock that the water flow or glacial ice sheet moves over. Sedimentary structures found in subaqueous fans are heavily dependent on the strength of the water flow.

== Glacial formation of the subaqueous fan ==
=== Background on glacial deposition ===
Ice is a more efficient agent of erosion compared to wind and water. Glaciers can carry a heavy load of sediment to the ice front of the glacier. At the ice front, as the glacier melts, sediment is deposited. As the glacier moves through a landscape, it begins to form a U-shaped valley which is characteristic of a glacier. These valleys are wide and flat allowing for the opportunity for sediment to be displaced far from the ice front. The sediments that are directly deposited from melting ice of the glacier is both unsorted and unstratified. These sediments are also known as till and it can be composed of variable sized rock fragments ranging from fine grains up to boulders called erratic. The wide range of particle size is the characteristic that differentiates ice deposited glacial sediment from water deposited glacial sediment.

=== Subaqueous fan formation in proglacial lake ===
In the case of the subaqueous fan, the till is deposited via meltwater streams downstream of the ice front. In this case, the sediment is well sorted and stratified and can form sedimentary structures and plains downstream. This sediment that was transported and distributed by the meltwater is referred to as outwash.

Subaqueous fans can be formed by the movement and retreat of glaciers. Subaqueous fans are composed of many different materials based on the makeup of the glacier that deposited there. As glaciers advance over a landscape, they scrape the ground beneath them through abrasion. The type of sediments that are picked up by the lobes of a glacial ice sheet are determined by the composition of the parent material that forms the bedrock in which the glacial ice sheet is moving over.

Eventually, the glacier will retreat and leave a large pile of sediment at its furthest advance called the terminal moraine. As the glacier retreats, it melts, allowing for meltwater to flow out of the bottom of the glacier to carry the sediments from the terminal moraine further into what is called an outwash plain. In the outwash plain, these sands and gravels are deposited. In some instances, an outwash plain can form a dam, which allows for the formation of a proglacial lake. This lake forms as glacial meltwater is trapped behind larger deposits of till that form the dam. These proglacial lakes were fed by glacial meltwater. Larger sediments would settle out first as the water moved into the area. This allowed for smaller sized sediments to be carried further into the proglacial lake creating the subaqueous fan. "Some proglacial lakes formed by glaciers were huge, many thousands of square kilometers in extent."

== Grain size distribution ==
=== Proglacial lake setting ===
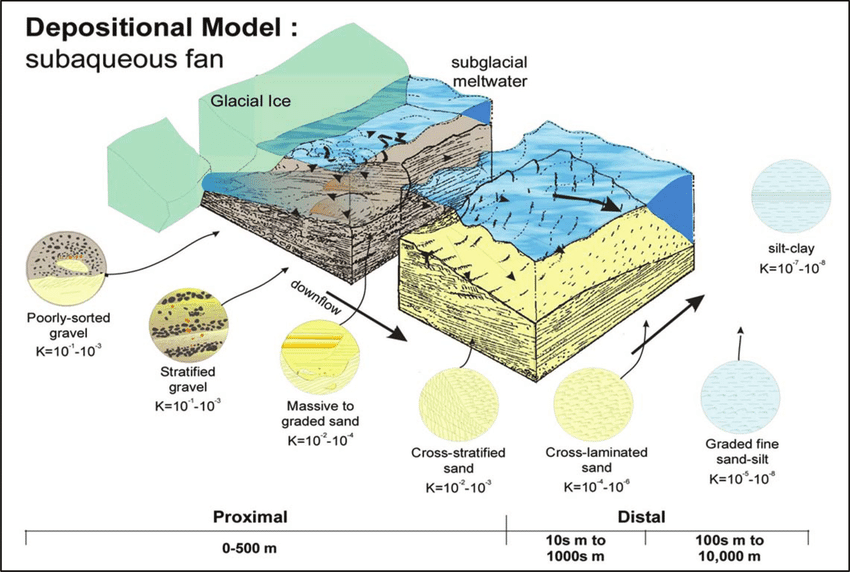
Figure 1: Depositional model of a subaqueous fan depicting the relationship of sediment grain size and depositional distance away from the glacial ice.

The sediments that have been deposited in the proglacial lake are sorted based on both size and composition. As seen in Figure 1, both composition of sediment and the size of sediment are dependent on the distance away from the retreating glacial ice. The stratigraphy fines rapidly from massive gravels to cross-stratified sand from 10 meters to about 100 meters away from the glacial ice. Eventually, when distances reach approximately 1,000 meters away, the grain size becomes finer and cross laminated, fine-grained sands are often found. As distances approach approximately a few thousand meters away from the glacial ice, graded fine sands and silts are found and eventually, silt-clays. Bedding in this depositional setting is primarily horizontal bedding. As you increase the distance from the glacial ice, sediment develops from heavily disorganized gravels into better organized and graded beds.

This difference in bedding styles can be further seen in Figure 2, which displays how water flow affects the deposition style of the sediment. The sediment deposited closer in proximity to the glacial ice forms dunes and antidunes whereas the sediment deposited further away from the glacial ice is more likely to form horizontal beds or climbing ripples. Gravel sized sediments will settle out of the water flow first and accumulate closer to the glacial ice. This allows for the water flow to carry smaller sediments further from the glacial ice.

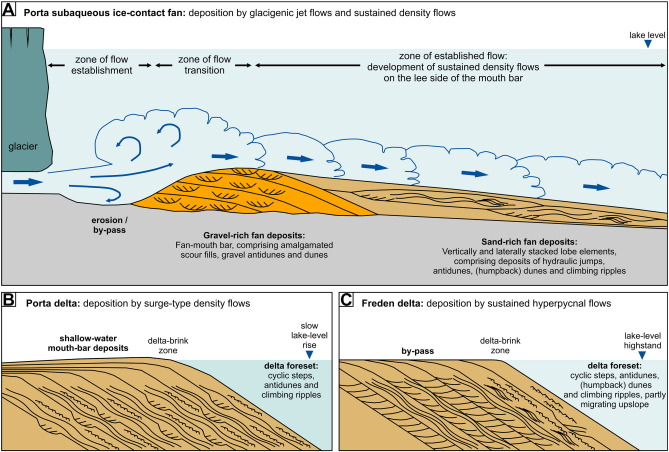
Figure 2: Depositional model of a subaqueous fan with emphasis on sedimentary structure and water flow.

After the gravel sediment accumulates, continued strong glacial meltwater current will form dunes. As the sediment that was carried and deposited further from the glacial ice settles out, the sediment will form climbing ripples. The ripples move downstream over time, and as more sediment settles out on top of the preexisting ripples, it causes the bed to appear to climb. Climbing ripples often occur in finer grained sediments. This occurs because the glacial meltwater current becomes much weaker the further away it is from the glacial ice source. These two distinct styles of bedding are heavily dependent on the distance away from the glacial ice and the strength of the meltwater.

Glaciers can also deposit smaller sized grains such as clay and silt in a proglacial lake at the edge of the ice. This area is known for alternating fine and coarse grained layers called varves that are formed by the seasonal freezing of the proglacial lake surface.

== Extraterrestrial subaqueous fans ==
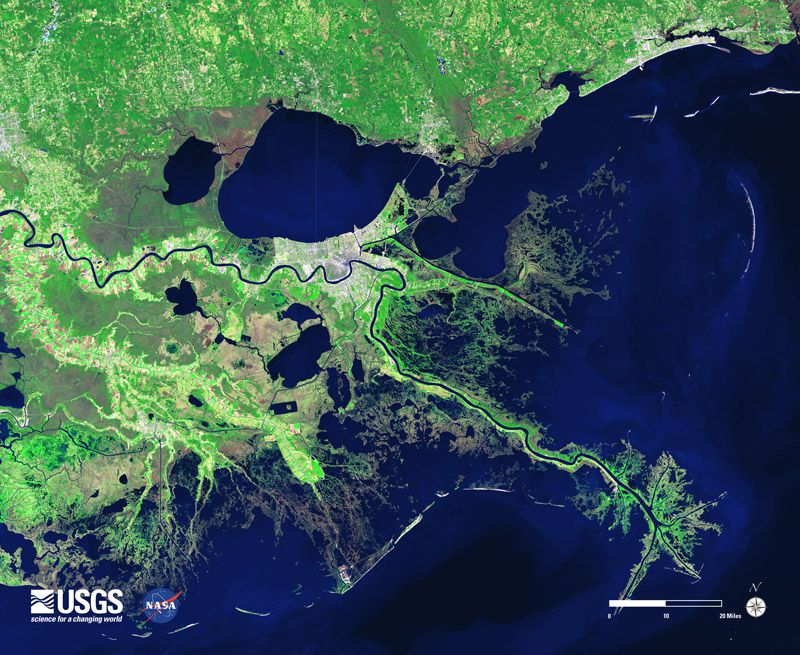
Figure 3: The Mississippi River delta includes these underwater alluvial fans which are denoted by the light brown areas on this satellite imagery from the United States Geological Survey (USGS) and the National Aeronautics and Space Association (NASA).

Subaqueous fans have been discovered on Mars. Even though the presence of surface water is currently lacking on Mars, there have been multiple observations that lead to the revelation that there once was liquid water present on the planet's surface. One of these revelations includes the characteristics of ancient lakes such as hydrated minerals found in these basin regions.

Although there have been several fan complexes found on Mars, there were two with morphology characteristics very different from the already identified fans on the planet. Identification of these depositional fans occurred at the bottom of the Southwestern region of the Melas Chasma (an enclosed basin in this canyon). Features of these subaqueous fans include several elongated lobes consisting of turbidite deposits and dendritic terminations. After extensive comparison with the subaqueous fan complex present at the mouth of the Mississippi River (shown in Figure 3), these fans proved to be consistent with a deep subaqueous fan depositional system.

== Subclass of subaqueous fans ==
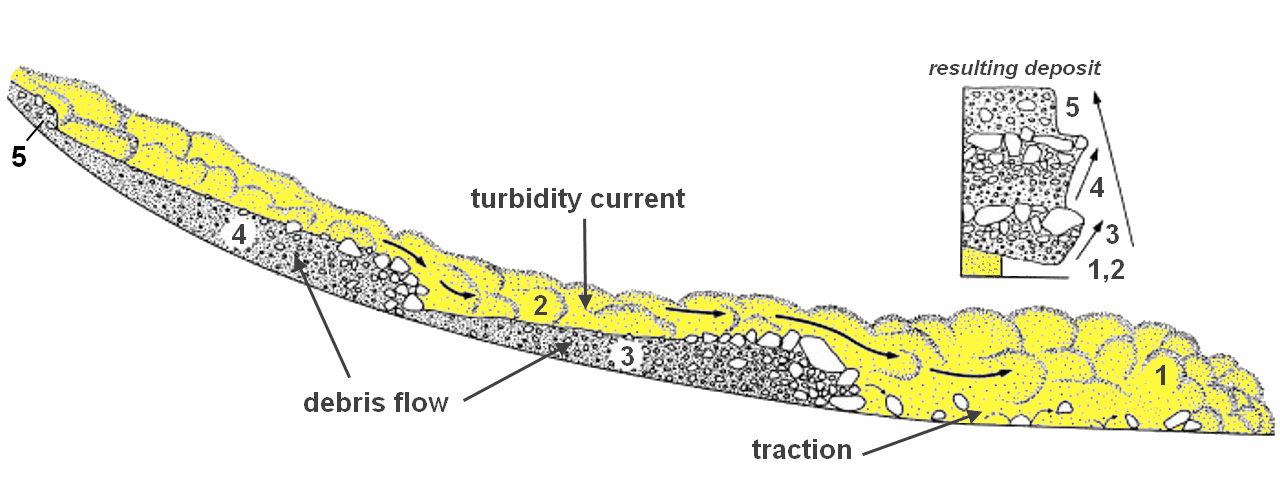
Figure 4: Demonstrates how debris flow induces turbidity currents which results in turbidite deposits.

These fan-shaped deposits refer to those that are underwater, leaving a broad range of options to fall under this category. A subclass of subaqueous fans may include underwater fan formations that are found on the ocean floor which can be specifically referred to as submarine or abyssal fans. These fan formations can be quite massive and are often the result of turbidite deposits from underwater density currents such as turbidity currents. These currents are typically short-lived, but are able to distribute great amounts of sediment into the deep ocean (Figure 4) making them a massive contributor to submarine fan formation. An important process that leads to density currents and ultimately submarine fan formation includes shelf-edge sediment failure which initiates mass movements of sediment (sometimes referred to as debris flow). These kinds of failures often occur when continental shelves or submarine canyons lose their stability from too much sediment accumulation. This is why submarine fans are often found at the base of continental shelves and submarine canyons. Submarine fan formations are known to be strong indicators of tectonic and climatic fluctuations as well.
