= Legal Adviser to the Foreign, Commonwealth and Development Office =

Legal

The Legal Adviser to the Foreign and Commonwealth Office (known as Legal Adviser to the Foreign Office until 1968) is the chief legal adviser and the head of the Legal Directorate of the Foreign and Commonwealth Office. The current Legal Adviser is Sally Langrish.

== History ==
Until 1872, it was the practice of the Foreign Office to seek legal advice from the Law Officers of the Crown and from the Queen's Advocate General. That year, Sir Travers Twiss, the Queen's Advocate resigned, and the office lapsed, though from 1872 to 1886 Sir James Parker Deane discharged the functions of the office in relation to the Foreign Office. In 1876, Sir Julian Pauncefote was appointed an assistant under secretary to provide in-house legal advice to the Foreign Office, although he never held the title of Legal Adviser.

In 1886, Edward Davidson was appointed Legal Assistant to the Foreign Office. When Pauncefote was appointed British Minister to the United States in 1892, the Foreign Office List began to list Davidson as Legal Adviser eo nomine. In 1896 he was listed immediately below under secretaries and ahead of the chief clerk.

== Duties ==
The Legal Adviser heads the Legal Directorate of the Foreign and Commonwealth Office, which is responsible for providing legal advice to FCO ministers and officials. In 2013, the Directorate had a staff of 70, of whom around 50 are lawyers based in London. Some legal advisers are also posted abroad.

The Legal Adviser ranks as a director general, reporting directly to the Permanent Under-Secretary of State for Foreign Affairs. Reporting to him are four deputy legal advisers, legal counsellors, and assistant legal advisers.

== Holders ==
- Sir Edward Davidson (1886–1918; eo nomine from 1892)
- Sir Cecil Hurst (1918–1929)
- Sir William Malkin (1929–1945)
- Sir Eric Beckett (1945–1953)
- Sir Gerald Fitzmaurice (1953–1960)
- Sir Francis Vallat (1960–1968)
- Sir Vincent Evans (1968–1975)
- Sir James McPetrie (1968–1971)
- Sir Ian Sinclair (1976–1984)
- Sir John Freeland (1984–1987)
- Sir Arthur Watts (1987–1991)
- Sir Frank Berman (1991–1999)
- Sir Michael Charles Wood (1999–2006)
- Sir Daniel Lincoln Bethlehem (2006–2011)
- Sir Iain Macleod (2011–2022)
- Sally Langrish (2022–present)
