= Laidlaw Library =

Laidlaw Library may refer to:

- Laidlaw Library at the University of Leeds, England, UK
- University College Library (formerly Laidlaw Library) at the University of Toronto, Ontario, Canada
