= Francis Vallat =

British international lawyer

Francis Vallat, c. 1962

Sir Francis Aimé Vallat, GBE, KCMG, QC (25 May 1912 – 6 April 2008) was a British international lawyer.

== Biography ==
Vallat was educated at University College, University of Toronto and Gonville and Caius College, University of Cambridge, where he studied under Arnold McNair and took the LL.B. He was called to the bar by Gray's Inn in 1935. Prior to the war, he spent a year teaching law at the University of Bristol.

During World War II, Vallat served with the Royal Air Force Volunteer Reserve. Upon being demobilized in 1945, he joined the Foreign Office as an assistant legal adviser. In 1960, he succeeded to Sir Gerald Fitzmaurice as Legal Adviser to the Foreign Office, serving in that position until 1968.

Upon his retirement from the Foreign Office, Vallat joined the faculty of King's College London, retiring with the rank of professor in 1976. Between 1973 and 1981 he was a member of the United Nations International Law Commission, and was its chair between 1977 and 1978.

Vallat was appointed Queen's Counsel in 1961. He was appointed CMG in 1955, and promoted to KCMG in 1962. In 1982 he was appointed GBE.
