= UC Library =

UC Library may refer to:

- University of California Libraries
- University College Library at the University of Toronto
- University of Chicago Library
- University of Cincinnati Libraries
