= Anglo-Iranian Oil Co. case =

1951–1952 public international law dispute

United Kingdom v. Iran
- Court: International Court of Justice
- Full case name: Anglo-Iranian Oil Company. (United Kingdom v. Iran)
- Decided: 22 July 1952

Outcome
- Jurisdiction rejected

Court membership
- Judges sitting: see below

Case opinions
- Majority: 9
- Dissent: 5

The United Kingdom v Iran [1952] ICJ 2 (also known as the Anglo-Iranian Oil Co. case) was a public international law dispute between the UK and Iran. This case concerned the nationalization of the Iranian oil industry which had been, in large part, controlled by the United Kingdom since the early 20th century.

== Background ==
The Anglo-Iranian Oil Company (formerly the Anglo-Persian Oil Company and currently BP) had been drilling for oil in Iran since 1913. In 1908, a British venture capitalist discovered oil in southern Iran. Throughout the early 20th century, the Iranian government made various concessions with the British that gave the UK control over certain elements in the Iranian economy, the 1901 D'Arcy Concession being the earliest of these oil concessions. In 1933, another concession was made which extended the terms of the D'Arcy Concession by 32 years, from 1961 until 1993 and altered how revenue was allocated. The concession would later stoke discontent within Iran.

When Mohammad Mosaddeq became Iran's prime minister in 1951, his National Front party sought to nationalize Iran's oil industry and succeeded in doing so. This then led to the case of United Kingdom v. Iran being taken up by the International Court of Justice (ICJ).

== Facts ==
The UK alleged that the Iranian oil nationalization act of 1951 was counter to a convention agreed upon by the Anglo-Persian Oil Company (now BP) and Iran in 1933. This granted the Anglo-Iranian Oil Company a 60-year licence to mine oil in 260,000 square kilometres (100,000 sq mi) of Iran in return for a percentage royalty.

On 26 May 1951, the UK took Iran to the ICJ, demanding that the 1933 agreement be upheld and that Iran pay damages and compensation for disrupting the UK-incorporated company's profits.

The ICJ quickly issued a temporary ruling, proposing to supervise the operations of the oil company by a board of 5 — two from each state and a fifth from a third — until the legal question had been resolved. The UK accepted, whereas Iran declined as a matter of principle, arguing that the ICJ had no jurisdiction over this case. The UK lodged a formal complaint to the Security Council, claiming that Iran jeopardized world peace by rejecting the temporary ruling out of hand, but the UK was unable to gain enough votes.

The Iranian government first collaborated with French lawyers who withdrew one month before the trial, due to pressures from the British government. Iran then called Belgian lawyer Henri Rolin, who based the defense on the fact that the ICJ had no jurisdiction in this matter.

== People involved ==
=== Sitting judges ===
| Name | Nationality | Position | Opinion |
|---|---|---|---|
| Arnold Duncan McNair | United Kingdom | President^{a} | Majority |
| José Gustavo Guerrero | El Salvador | Vice President^{a} | Majority^{b} |
| Alejandro Álvarez | Chile | Judge | Dissent |
| Enrique c. Armand-Ugon | Uruguay | Judge | Majority^{b} |
| Abdel Hamid Badawi | Egypt | Judge | Majority^{b} |
| Jules Basdevant | France | Judge | Dissent^{b} |
| Levi Fernandes Carneiro | Brazil | Judge | Dissent |
| Green Hackworth | United States | Judge | Dissent |
| Helge Klæstad | Norway | Judge | Majority^{b} |
| Hsu Mo | China | Judge | Majority^{b} |
| John Erskine Read | Canada | Judge | Dissent |
| Bohdan Winiarski | Poland | Judge | Majority^{b} |
| Milovan Zoričić | Yugoslavia | Judge | Majority^{b} |
| Karim Sanjabi | Iran | ad hoc Judge^{c} | Majority^{b} |
| Edvard Hambro | Norway | Registrar | —N/a |
^{a} Presidency for this case was assumed by the Vice President, due to nationality of the President.^{b} Opinion not recorded officially.^{c} Appointed by Iranian government acting under Article 31§2 of the ICJ Statute.

=== Representatives ===
Iranian delegation
| Name | Role |
|---|---|
| (Iran) Hossein Navab | Agent |
| (Iran) Mohammad Mosaddegh | Agent |
| (Iran) Nasrollah Entezam | Advocate |
| (Belgium) Henri Rolin | Advocate |
| (Iran) Allahyar Saleh | Counsel |
| (Iran) Ali Shayegan | Counsel |
| (Iran) Mozaffar Baghai | Counsel |
| (Iran) Kazem Hassibi | Counsel |
| (Iran) Mohamad-Hossein Aliabadi | Counsel |
| (Belgium) Marcel Sluszny | Counsel |

British delegation
| Name | Role |
|---|---|
| (United Kingdom) Eric Beckett | Agent |
| (United Kingdom) Lionel Heald | Counsel |
| (United Kingdom) Humphrey Waldock | Counsel |
| (United Kingdom) H. A. P. Fisher | Counsel |
| (United Kingdom) D. H. N. Johnson | Counsel |
| (United Kingdom) A. D. M. Ross | Expert Adviser |
| (United Kingdom) A. K. Rothnie | Expert Adviser |

== Judgment ==
On 22 July 1952, the ICJ decided that because Iran had conceded to ICJ jurisdiction only in cases involving treaties agreed upon after 1932 and as the only treaty cited by the UK after that date was between Iran and a foreign company (and not the UK itself), it had no jurisdiction in this matter (Iran's original contention).

== Aftermath ==
Despite the outcome of the case, the British government was determined to both reclaim control of Iran's oil fields and signal to other countries that nationalization efforts would lead to retaliation. Along with the United States government, it began an oil boycott against Iran as a means of cutting off petroleum profits and weakening the Iranian government. The value of the rial fell by 45%. Following this, the UK's intelligence service, MI6 requested assistance from the United States' newly-formed Central Intelligence Agency (CIA) to overthrow Mosaddeq. What followed was a series of disruptions and eventually Mosaddeq was overthrown in a coup in August 1953. Mohammad Reza Shah returned to Iran, solidified his authority backed by the U.S., and allowed a mix of foreign companies to control pricing and production in the oil sector for another 20 years, though with some increase in domestic revenue.

== See also ==
- Anglo-Iranian Oil Dispute
- List of International Court of Justice cases
