= Sylvia Bashevkin =

Canadian academic and writer

Sylvia Bashevkin OC FRSC

15th Principal of University College, Toronto
- In office 2005 – 2011
- Preceded by: Paul Joseph Perron
- Succeeded by: Donald C. Ainslie

Personal details
- Born: Sylvia Beth Bashevkin

Academic background
- Education: Hampshire College (BA); University of Michigan (MA); York University (PhD)

Academic work
- Discipline: Political science
- Institutions: University College, Toronto
- Main interests: Government of Canada, Comparative Politics, Public Policy

Sylvia Beth Bashevkin OC FRSC (born 1954) is a Canadian academic and writer known for her research in the field of women and politics.

== Career ==
Bashevkin is a professor in the Department of Political Science in the University of Toronto Faculty of Arts and Science. From 2005 to 2011, she was Principal of University College, Toronto. She is a senior fellow of Massey College, Toronto.

In 2001, she was elected a Fellow of the Royal Society of Canada. In 2005, Bashevkin was named Canada's Most Powerful Women: Top 100 Award by the Women's Executive Network. Later in 2014, she was awarded the Royal Society of Canada's Ursula Franklin Award in Gender Studies. That same year, she was also the recipient of the Mildred A. Schwartz Lifetime Achievement Award from the American Political Science Association.

In 2017, Bashevkin published an article titled "Listening to women leaders: Feminist narratives among US foreign policy" which was subsequently short listed for the 2018 Jill Vickers Prize by the Canadian Political Science Association. The following year, Bashevkin was awarded the ISA Bertha Lutz Prize by the International Studies Association.

She was appointed to the Order of Canada in 2024.

== Selected bibliography ==
- Women As Foreign Policy Leaders: National Security and Gender Politics in Superpower America (Oxford University Press, 2018)
- Women, Power, Politics: The Hidden Story of Canada's Unfinished Democracy (Oxford University Press, 2009)
- Tales of Two Cities: Women and Municipal Restructuring in London and Toronto (University of British Columbia Press, 2006)
- Welfare Hot Buttons: Women, Work and Social Policy Reform (University of Toronto Press and University of Pittsburgh Press, 2002)
- Women on the Defensive: Living Through Conservative Times (University of Chicago Press and University of Toronto Press, 1998)
- Toeing the Lines: Women and Party Politics in English Canada (2nd ed., Oxford University Press, 1993)
- True Patriot Love: The Politics of Canadian Nationalism (Oxford University Press, 1991)
- Toeing the Lines: Women and Party Politics in English Canada (University of Toronto Press, 1985)
