= Eric Beckett =

British lawyer

Beckett in 1949.

Sir William Eric Beckett, KCMG, QC (20 October 1896 – 27 August 1966) was a British international lawyer who served as Legal Adviser to the Foreign Office from 1945 to 1953.

== Biography ==
Beckett was born in Hawarden, Flintshire, the son of a land agent. He was educated at Sherborne School, before serving with the 3rd Gattalion, Cheshire Regiment during the First World War. He served in France, Salonika, and the Caucasus, and reached the rank of captain. He then entered Wadham College, Oxford, where he was a scholar, took first-class honours in Jurisprudence, and won the Eldon Law Scholarship. He was elected a prize fellow of All Souls College, Oxford in 1921.

He was called to the bar by the Inner Temple in 1922, joined the Foreign Office as assistant legal adviser in 1925, and was promoted second legal adviser in 1929. He played a key role in the 1930 League of Nations Codification Conference and in relation to the abolition of the capitulatory regime in Egypt in 1934. He advised the British government during the Bretton Woods Conference in 1944, and played an important part in the first three assemblies of the United Nations.

Beckett became Legal Adviser to the Foreign Office in 1945, succeeding Sir William Malkin. As Legal Adviser, Beckett was responsible for a heavy litigation program involving the United Kingdom. He led the British legal team in the Corfu Channel case, the Anglo-Norwegian Fisheries case, and the Anglo-Iranian Oil Company case, and participated in many others. He retired due to illness in 1953.

Beckett became a CMG in 1931, a King's Counsel in 1946 and was promoted to KCMG in 1948.

== Family ==
Beckett married Katharine Mary Richards, younger daughter of the international lawyer Sir Henry Erle Richards, in 1925; they had two sons and one daughter.
