= Frank Berman =

British diplomat and judge

Sir Franklin Delow Berman, KCMG, KC (born 23 December 1939) is a British barrister and leading authority in international law. He was Legal Adviser to the Foreign and Commonwealth Office from 1991 to 1999.

== Background and education ==
Berman was born in South Africa. He was educated at Rondebosch Boys' High School, the University of Cape Town (BA in Mathematics 1959, BSc 1960), and Wadham College, Oxford, where he was a Rhodes Scholar, and took first class honours in Jurisprudence. He then undertook doctoral work at Nuffield College, Oxford, where he held a studentship.

== Diplomatic Service ==
Berman joined Her Majesty's Diplomatic Service in 1965, and was called to the bar of Middle Temple in 1966. He was assistant legal advisor for the Foreign and Commonwealth Office from 1965 to 1971, legal advisor to the British Military Government of Berlin from 1971 to 1972, legal adviser at the British Embassy, Bonn, from 1972 to 1974. He was a legal counsellor for the FCO from 1974/5–82, counsellor for the UK Mission to the United Nations from 1982 to 1985. He became deputy legal adviser in 1988 and served as Legal Adviser to the Foreign and Commonwealth Office from 1991 to 1999. He was made an honorary Queen's Counsel in 1992.

== After the Diplomatic Service ==
He joined Essex Court Chambers in 2000, where he continues to practice law with a specialisation in international arbitration and advisory work in international law. He served as an ad hoc judge for the International Court of Justice from 2003 to 2005, and has been a member of the Permanent Court of Arbitration since 2010. He is a visiting professor of international law at the University of Oxford and the University of Cape Town, and of King's College London.

Berman has served as an arbitrator in ICSID, LCIA and ICC cases. He was appointed in 2010 as the Legal Member of the Court of Arbitration between Pakistan and India under the Indus Waters Treaty.

== Boards and committees ==
He has been chair of the Diplomatic Service Association (1979–82), the Appeals Board of the International Oil Pollution Compensation Fund (1985–2004), the Trustees of the University of Cape Town (member since 1999, chair since 2010), the Austrian National Fund for Compensation of Victims of Nazi Persecution (2001–present), and the Diplomatic Service Appeals Board (2002–06); and has served as a board member or trustee of many other organisations.

== Honours ==
Berman was made a KCMG on 31 December 1993. He became an Honorary Fellow of Wadham College 1995, and of the Society of Advanced Legal Studies in 1997. He was awarded the Grand Decoration of Honour in Gold with Star by the Austrian Government in 2007. The University of Cape Town offers an annual Sir Franklin Berman Prize in International Law.
