= John Freeland =

British diplomat and international lawyer

Sir John Freeland KCMG QC

Judge of the European Court of Human Rights in respect of the United Kingdom
- In office 1991–1998
- Preceded by: Sir Vincent Evans

Personal details
- Born: John Redvers Freeland; July 16, 1927 Hendon, London
- Died: 29 June 2014 (aged 86)
- Education: Corpus Christi College, Cambridge

Sir John Redvers Freeland KCMG QC (16 July 1927 – 29 June 2014) was a British diplomat and international lawyer.

== Early life ==
Freeland was born on 16 July 1927 in Hendon, London to Clarence Redvers Freeland and Freda Freeland (née Walker). He was educated at Stowe School and at Corpus Christi College, Cambridge. He married Sarah Hayward in 1952.

== Career ==
Freeland was appointed Companion of the Order of St Michael and St George (CMG) in 1973. He was the Legal Adviser to the Foreign and Commonwealth Office from 1984 to 1987. He became a Bencher of Lincoln's Inn in 1985. He took silk as Queen's Counsel in 1987. He was appointed as Judge of the European Court of Human Rights in respect of the United Kingdom on 23 April 1991. He was re-elected as Judge on 4 January 1992, and relinquished office along with every other judge of the court upon the entry into force of Protocol 11 of the European Convention on Human Rights on 1 November 1998.

== Death ==
Freeland died on 29 June 2014. He was survived by his wife, son, and daughter.
