= Vincent Evans =

British diplomat and international lawyer (1915-2007)

Sir Vincent Evans GCMG MBE QC

Judge of the European Court of Human Rights in respect of the United Kingdom
- In office 1980–1991
- Preceded by: Sir Gerald Fitzmaurice
- Succeeded by: Sir John Freeland

Personal details
- Born: 20 October 1915 London
- Died: 18 May 2007 (aged 91)
- Education: Wadham College, Oxford
- Profession: Barrister

Sir William Vincent John Evans GCMG MBE QC (20 October 1915 – 18 May 2007) was a British diplomat and international lawyer, who served as Judge of the European Court of Human Rights in respect of the United Kingdom from 1980 to 1991.

== Early life ==
Evans was born in London and educated at Merchant Taylors' School, Northwood, and Wadham College, Oxford, where he obtained a First Class Honours degree in Jurisprudence in 1937 and a BCL on a Cassel Scholarship from Lincoln's Inn in 1938. He was called to the Bar at Lincoln's Inn in 1939 but joined the Army that year on the outbreak of the Second World War, becoming a Lieutenant Colonel and being appointed MBE in 1945, and was appointed Legal Advisor to the British Administration in Cyrenaica, the eastern coastal region of Libya.

== Diplomatic career ==
Upon leaving the Army, he was appointed Assistant Legal Adviser to the Foreign Office in 1947 and was involved in drafting of the United Nations Universal Declaration of Human Rights, and became Legal Counsellor to the UK Permanent Mission to the UN in 1954.

He left this post in 1959, at which time he was appointed Companion of the Order of St Michael and St George (CMG), and returned to the Foreign Officer as Legal Counsellor, being promoted to Deputy Legal Adviser in 1960 and Legal Adviser in 1968.

He chaired the Council of Europe's European Committee on Legal Cooperation from 1969 to 1971, and was appointed Knight Commander of the Order of St Michael and St George (KCMG) in 1970 and Knight Grand Cross (GCMG) in 1976, and Queen's Counsel in 1973.

== Retirement ==
He retired from the Foreign Office in 1975 but remained involved in international legal affairs. He served as the UK's Representative to the Council of Europe Steering Committee on Human Rights from 1976 to 1980, and chaired the group in his last year there. In 1977, he became a Member of the United Nations Human Rights Committee and was its Vice-Chairman from 1979 to 1980. He left the Committee in 1984 and was succeeded by Dame Rosalyn Higgins, who went on to become the first female member of the International Court of Justice, and its president from 2006 to 2009. He was also a Member of the Permanent Court of Arbitration from 1987 to 1997.

In 1980, he was elected the judge in respect of the United Kingdom at the then non-permanent European Court of Human Rights in Strasbourg, succeeding Sir Gerald Fitzmaurice, also a former Foreign Office lawyer and judge of the Permanent Court of Arbitration. He spent ten years at the Court, taking part in a number of significant judgements including Dudgeon v United Kingdom, and retired in 1991.

He was Vice-President of the British Institute of Human Rights from 1992 to 2004, a member of the Advisory Board of the Centre for International Human Rights Law at the University of Essex from 1983 to 1994, and a member of the Council of Management of the British Institute of International and Comparative Law from 1969 to 2005.

== Personal life ==
Evans married Joan Mary Symons in 1947, with whom he had a son and two daughters. He was a keen gardener and a member of the Athenæum. He died on 18 May 2007.

Legal offices
Preceded by Sir Gerald Fitzmaurice	United Kingdom Judge of the European Court of Human Rights; 1980–1991	Succeeded by Sir John Freeland
