= Ian Sinclair (barrister) =

British international lawyer and diplomat

Sir Ian Sinclair
- Born: Ian McTaggart Sinclair; 14 January 1926; Glasgow, Sinclair
- Died: 8 July 2013 (aged 87)
- Occupations: lawyer and diplomat

Sir Ian McTaggart Sinclair KCMG QC (14 January 1926 – 8 July 2013) was a British international lawyer and diplomat.

Born in Glasgow, Sinclair was educated at the Glasgow Academy, Merchiston Castle School, and King's College, Cambridge, where he read law. He joined the Foreign Office as an assistant legal adviser in 1950. In 1976, he was appointed Legal Adviser to the Foreign and Commonwealth Office, serving until 1984, when he retired early. After his retirement, Sinclair returned to the bar.
