= Daniel Bethlehem =

English barrister and former legal advisor

Sir Daniel Lincoln Bethlehem KCMG KC (born 16 June 1960) is a barrister and former Legal Adviser to the Foreign and Commonwealth Office of the United Kingdom government. Before that he was an external Legal Adviser to Israeli Government, working with Ariel Sharon and Benjamin Netanyahu governments, and representing them at the International Court of Justice in The Hague.

He is a founding director of Legal Policy International Limited (LPI), From May 2006 to May 2011, he was the principal Legal Adviser to the United Kingdom's Foreign and Commonwealth Office. Prior to this, he was in practice at the London Bar and director of the Lauterpacht Centre for International Law at the University of Cambridge and a fellow of Clare Hall, Cambridge.
