= Maurice Swynfen Fitzmaurice =

Vice-Admiral Sir Maurice Swynfen Fitzmaurice KCVO CB CMG
- Portrait by Walter Stoneman, 1918
- Born: 12 August 1870
- Died: 23 January 1927 (aged 56)
- Military career
- Allegiance: United Kingdom
- Branch: Royal Navy
- Rank: Vice-Admiral
- Commands: HMS Triumph; HMS Dreadnought; Director of Naval Intelligence
- Conflicts: Gambia Campaign; East African Campaign; Second Boer War
- Awards: Mentioned in Despatches (1894); Mentioned in Despatches (1898); Companion of the Order of St Michael and St George; Order of the Sacred Treasure (Second Class) (Japan); Officer of the Legion d'honneur (France); War Cross (Greece); Royal Order of the Redeemer (Greece); Companion of the Order of the Bath; Knight Commander of the Royal Victorian Order

Vice-Admiral Sir Maurice Swynfen Fitzmaurice, KCVO, CB, CMG (12 August 1870 – 23 January 1927) was an officer of the Royal Navy.

He served in a number of campaigns in Africa, being twice mentioned in despatches, and had risen to the rank of captain prior to the outbreak of World War I. He served in the Mediterranean, where his ship was sunk by a submarine, and was later appointed to a number of staff posts. He collected a number of awards for his services in the war, and after its end became Director of Naval Intelligence. He died in 1927 while serving as Commander in Chief, Africa, located in Simonstown.

== Career ==
Maurice Fitzmaurice was born on 12 August 1870, the son of John Gerald Fitzmaurice and Florence Augusta Marian Boyrenson.

He entered the British Navy and took part in the Gambia Campaign in 1894. For his services in this conflict he was mentioned in despatches. He went on to see action in the East African Campaign in 1898, during which he was wounded, and again was mentioned in despatches. Fitzmaurice was active in the Second Boer War between 1899 and 1901. He was promoted to commander on 31 December 1902, and in February 1903 was posted to the HMS President as an advisor on gunnery for ships building at contractors. Promotion to captain followed on 30 June 1910.

During World War I he captained the battleship HMS Triumph, from 5 August 1914 until her loss during the Dardanelles Campaign in 1915. Triumph was torpedoed by the German submarine SM U-21 on 25 May. As she capsized Fitzmaurice was thrown into the water 'as though he had been shot from a gun'. He was picked up by a destroyer after several minutes in the water, apparently with his monocle still firmly in place. He then served as Principal Naval Transport Officer, Dardanelles and Salonika from 1915 until 1916, and then Chief of Staff, Eastern Mediterranean until 1917.

Fitzmaurice received a number of awards, including several from foreign powers, for his service during the war. He was made a Companion of the Order of St Michael and St George in 1916, and the award of the Second Class of the Order of the Sacred Treasure, a Japanese honour, in 1917. Further awards followed, and by the end of the war he was an Officer of the Legion d'honneur and had been awarded the War Cross and the Royal Order of the Redeemer by Greece.

He served as captain of HMS Dreadnought in 1918 and from 1 January 1919 was Commodore commanding the British Aegean Squadron. He became a rear-admiral on 26 November 1920, and was Director of Naval Intelligence between 1921 and 1924, after which he became commander in chief on the Africa Station on 12 December 1924. He became a Companion of the Order of the Bath in 1922 and a Knight Commander of the Royal Victorian Order in 1925.

Sir Maurice Fitzmaurice reached the rank of vice-admiral in 1926 and died on 23 January 1927, aged 56. He was at the time Commander-in-Chief, Africa.

== Family and personal life ==
Fitzmaurice was a keen musician, and a Director of the Royal Academy of Music, a member of the Royal College of Organists, and a Fellow of the Royal Philharmonic Society. He played the organ, and enjoyed the works of J. S. Bach.

Fitzmaurice married Mabel Gertrude Gray, the daughter of Samuel Gray, a pastoralist and politician in New South Wales, on 13 October 1896. The couple had two children: Gerald Gray Fitzmaurice (born 24 October 1901; rose to be a distinguished judge) and Maurice James Fitzmaurice (born 1 January 1903; joined the Royal Air Force; attained the rank of Pilot Officer but died in a flying accident on 14 July 1923).

== Sources ==
- Bevand, Paul & Allen, Frank (2008). "Rear-Admiral Sir Maurice Swynfen FitzMaurice K.C.V.O., C.B." Royal Navy Flag-Officers 1904-1945. Archived from the original on 24 July 2011.
- Montgomery-Massingberd, Hugh (1976). Burke's Irish Family Records. London: Burkes Peerage Ltd.
- Thomas, Lowell (2002). Raiders of the Deep. Periscope Publishing Ltd. ISBN 1-904381-03-0.
- Parkinson, John (2001). "Wakamiya Maru off Tsingtao: September 1914".
- The Musical Times. Vol. 68. 1 March 1927. p. 270.

Military offices
Preceded by Hugh Sinclair	Director of Naval Intelligence; 1921–1924	Succeeded by Alan Hotham
Preceded by Sir Rudolph Bentinck	Commander-in-Chief, Africa; 1924–1926	Succeeded by Sir David Anderson
