= Iain Macleod (lawyer) =

British lawyer

Sir Iain Macleod, GCMG is a British lawyer who served as Legal Adviser to the Foreign and Commonwealth Office from 2011 to 2022.

Macleod was appointed Knight Commander of the Order of St Michael and St George (KCMG) in the 2017 New Year Honours. He was promoted to Knight Grand Cross (GCMG) in the 2022 Birthday Honours for services to the international rule of law and to legal services across HM Government.
