= The Gargoyle (newspaper) =

Student newspaper of University College, Toronto

- Type: Biweekly student newspaper
- Format: Compact
- School: University College, Toronto
- Editor-in-chief: Druphadi Sen & Meen Imran (2026-2027)
- Founded: 1954
- Relaunched: 1977
- Headquarters: Junior Common Room, University College; 15 King's College Circle; Toronto, ON
- ISSN: 0318-0107
- OCLC number: 29874070
- Website: www.ucgargoyle.ca

The Gargoyle is the student newspaper of University College at the University of Toronto in Toronto, Ontario, Canada. It was named after the gargoyle statue in the college building, which was originally created by Frederick Cumberland in emulation of tenth century medieval architecture.

The Gargoyle was established in 1954 as the first regularly appearing student newspaper at University College. Except for a hiatus between 1973 and 1977, it has published continuously since 1954.

The Gargoyle is staffed by an editorial masthead of undergraduate students, as well as a group of staff and regular contributors.

The Gargoyle is funded by a University College student levy of $1.50, which has not increased since 1990. The operational costs of the newspaper have been increasingly outpacing the budget, with a shortfall of several thousands of dollars in 2025; the newspaper relies on funding from the University College Literary and Athletic Society to cover the rest. In an attempt to address the increasing costs of printing, a student referendum was held in 2025 to increase the levy from $1.50 to $2.69, but it ultimately failed.

The Gargoyle has taken many formats over the years. Formerly self-described as a "knee-jerk, left-wing, reactionary rag," it currently calls itself "University of Toronto's greasiest publication" and includes six different sections, including politics, campus affairs (“uc”), arts & culture, opinions, poetry and prose (“avant-garg”), and comics, in addition to photography and visual art. The newspaper runs 12 issues every year, with annual issues including “issue 0” / “the frosh issue”, the reproductive justice issue, and the sex and love issue, featuring the newspaper’s annual nudes contest. The Gargoyle accepts contributions from all University of Toronto students, although the majority of contributors are from University College.

The Gargoyle was notable for its somewhat archaic production style. As opposed to most contemporary publications, The Gargoyle was, until 2008, laid out completely by hand, forsaking desktop publishing applications for scissors and glue. Issues were assembled on cardboard "flats", which were then physically transported to the printer. The Gargoyle has since shifted to a hybrid production style, in which most pages are still laid out by hand on paper but are then scanned and digitally modified. This shift of process has allowed for the possibility of online publication and resulted in the creation of The Gargoyle's website in 2010.

== See also ==
- The Varsity (newspaper)
- The Medium (University of Toronto Mississauga)
- List of student newspapers in Canada
- List of newspapers in Canada
