= University College, Toronto =

Constituent college of the University of Toronto

University College
- Constituent college
- University of Toronto
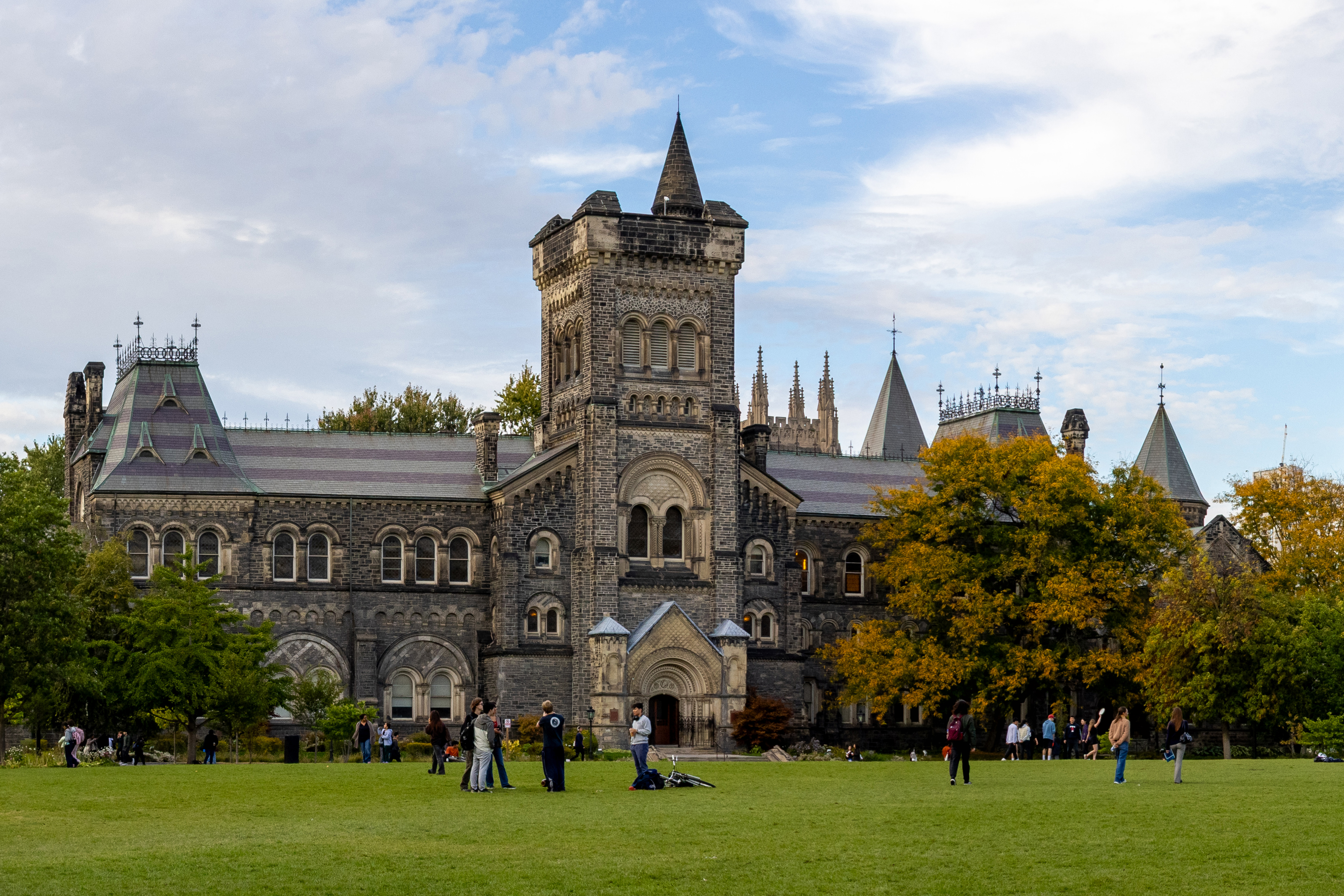
- Facade of the college's main building

- Arms: Gules on a chevron Argent between in chief two open books and in base a beaver statant the Royal Crown all proper.
- Location: 15 King's College Circle, Toronto, Ontario, Canada
- Coordinates: 43°39′46″N 79°23′44″W
- Abbreviation: UC
- Motto: Parum claris lucem dare (Latin)
- Motto in English: "To shed light on that which is obscure"
- Established: April 22, 1853 (173 years ago)
- Colours: Red
- Principal: Markus Stock
- Undergraduates: 4,538 full-time, 305 part-time (2017)
- Newspaper: The Gargoyle
- Website: www.uc.utoronto.ca

National Historic Site of Canada
- Official name: University College National Historic Site of Canada
- Designated: 1968

Ontario Heritage Act
- Criteria: Listed
- Designated: 1973

University College, popularly referred to as UC, is a constituent college of the University of Toronto, located on its St. George campus in Toronto, Ontario, Canada. It was created in 1853 as the nondenominational teaching arm of the University of Toronto and the provincial college of Canada West (what is now the province of Ontario). UC was the founding member of the university's federation and its non-denominationalism contrasted with contemporary institutions at the time, such as Trinity College and St. Michael's College, both of which later became part of the University of Toronto. It is one of the seven undergraduate colleges in the university's Faculty of Arts and Science.

University College's main building is a landmark on the St. George campus and one of two places at the University of Toronto that has been designated a National Historic Site of Canada, along with Annesley Hall of Victoria College. It is home to the oldest student government in Canada, the University College Literary and Athletic Society.

== History ==
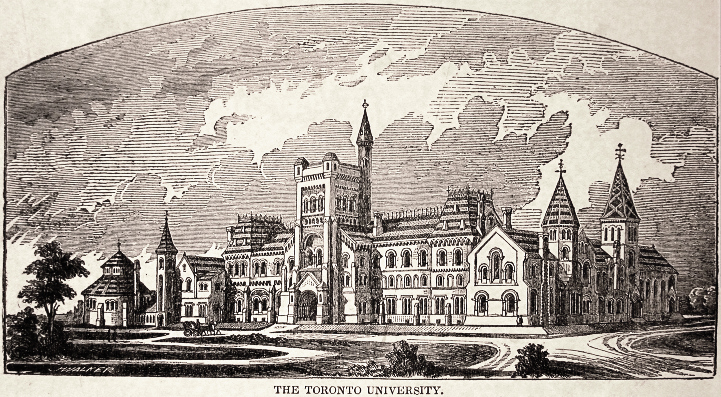
University College, c. 1860

Shortly after taking power in the first responsible government of the Province of Canada, Reformist politicians led by Robert Baldwin wrested control of King's College from the Church of England in 1849 and renamed it the University of Toronto. Baldwin envisioned that denominational colleges would soon decide to affiliate themselves under the secular University of Toronto, the provincial university, "with some vague status, perhaps as divinity halls". His hopes were dashed when the Presbyterian Queen's College in Kingston opted to stay independent. Baldwin resigned as premier in 1851, leaving his successor, Francis Hincks, to find another way to persuade the denominational colleges. Hincks decided that the university should adopt the collegiate university governance model, used for centuries at Oxbridge and more recently at the University of London.

On April 22, 1853, University College was created as the provincial college of Canada West, a designation it retains under the current University of Toronto Act. It was the first constituent college of the University of Toronto, inheriting the teaching functions and resources of the former King's College, while the university itself became an examination body. Frederick William Cumberland was appointed in 1856 as the university architect to design and oversee the construction of the college's new building, completed in 1859. Until Wycliffe College joined the university in 1889, University College was the only member college within the University of Toronto, and therefore the principal of the college was also the de facto chief of the entire university. The following year, Knox College and Victoria College also joined the University of Toronto.

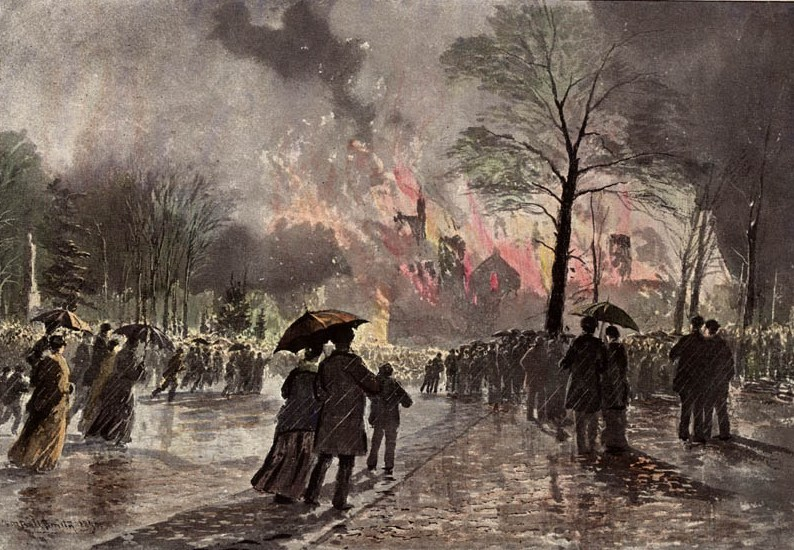
The University College fire of 1890, Dominion Illustrated

University College was severely damaged by a fire that gutted the entire eastern wing and the college library on 14 February 1890. The fire spread rapidly when servants accidentally dropped two kerosene lamps on a wooden staircase at around 7 p.m. while preparing the illumination for an annual college exhibition. In Ottawa, Edward Blake, the university's chancellor and a Member of Parliament, interrupted his speech to inform the House of Commons, "The great institution, the crown and glory, I may be permitted to say, of the educational institutions in our country is at the moment in flames ... and is now, so far as its material fabric goes, a ruin tottering to the ground." Only about 100 books were rescued before the fire consumed more than 33,000 volumes at the college library. Despite the initial fears, University College recovered from the fire with remarkable ease and speed. Wycliffe College and Knox College both offered space for classes to accommodate displaced students. The board of trustees commissioned a swift restoration of the structure with insurance compensations and additional investments. Within two years, the library was replenished with donations from institutions throughout the British Empire.

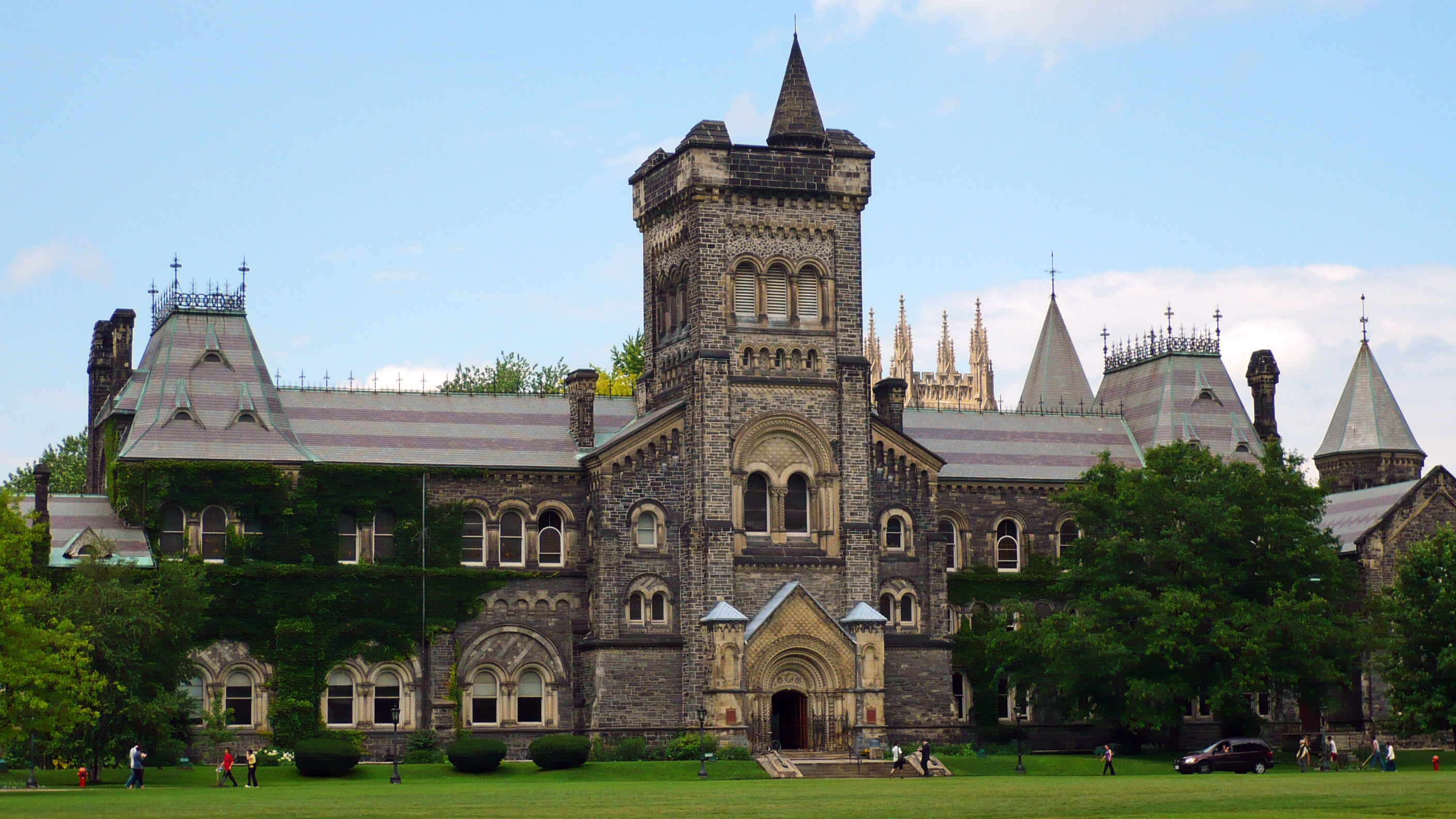
The main building of University College, a National Historic Site since 1968

On 15 February 1895, more than seven hundred University College students attended what was then described as the "largest mass meeting in the history of the University" to discuss the government's dismissal of William Dale, the popular professor of Latin at the college. William Lyon Mackenzie King, a senior undergraduate who would later become Prime Minister of Canada, introduced a successful motion at the meeting to "abstain from attendance at lectures at University College until a proper investigation be granted by the provincial government into the difficulties existing at the university." During the boycott of classes, professor of history George MacKinnon Wrong wrote to Chancellor Blake in England that only one student turned up at one of his lectures. The strike continued until 20 February, when students voted to return to classes after the government agreed to call a commission of inquiry.

In 1968, University College was designated a National Historic Site, in recognition of its historical role in creating the collegiate system at the University of Toronto, and as one of the earliest examples of the collegiate model at universities in the Commonwealth.

== Grounds and architecture ==
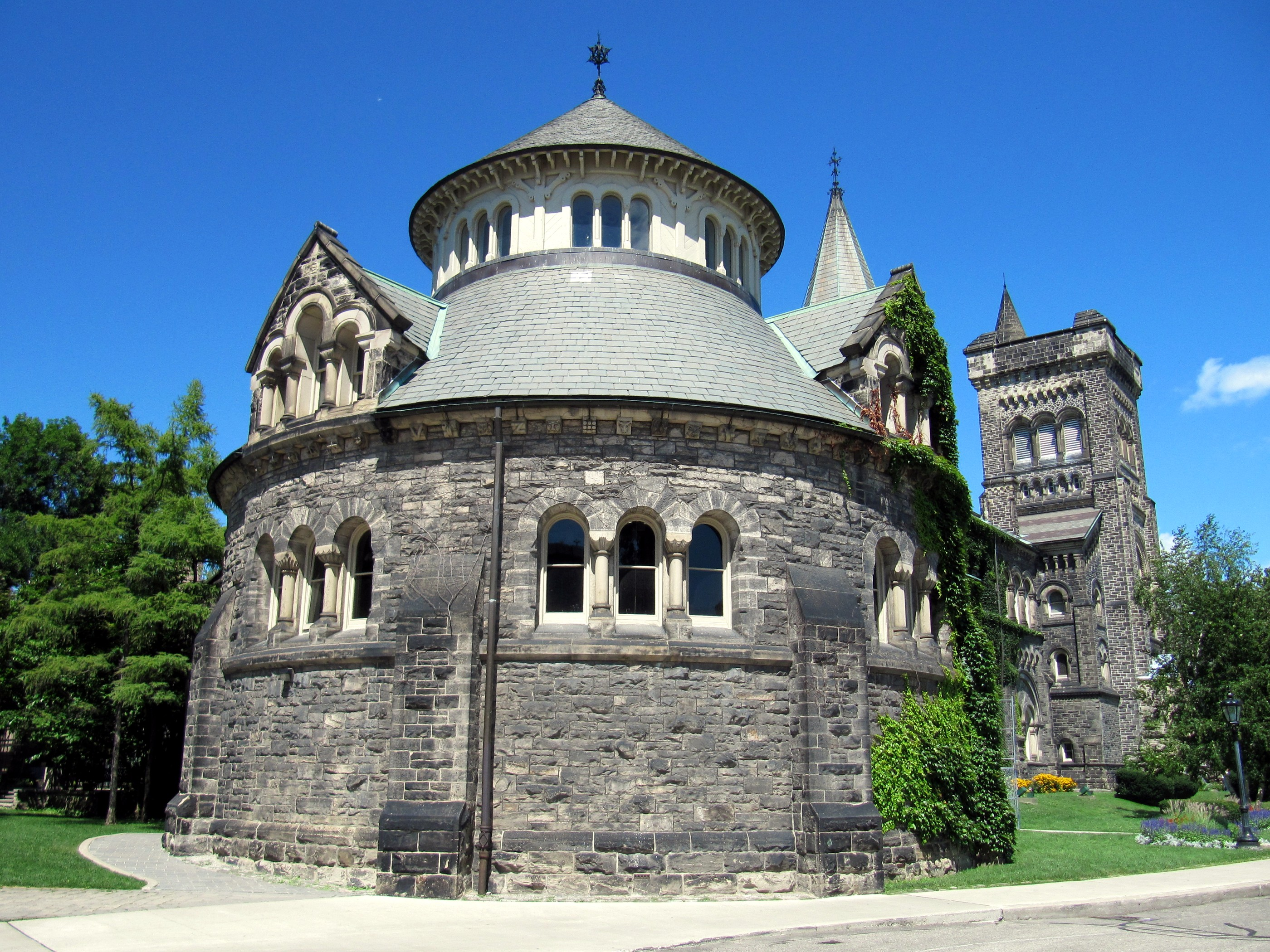
Croft Chapter House, named after chemistry professor Henry Holmes Croft

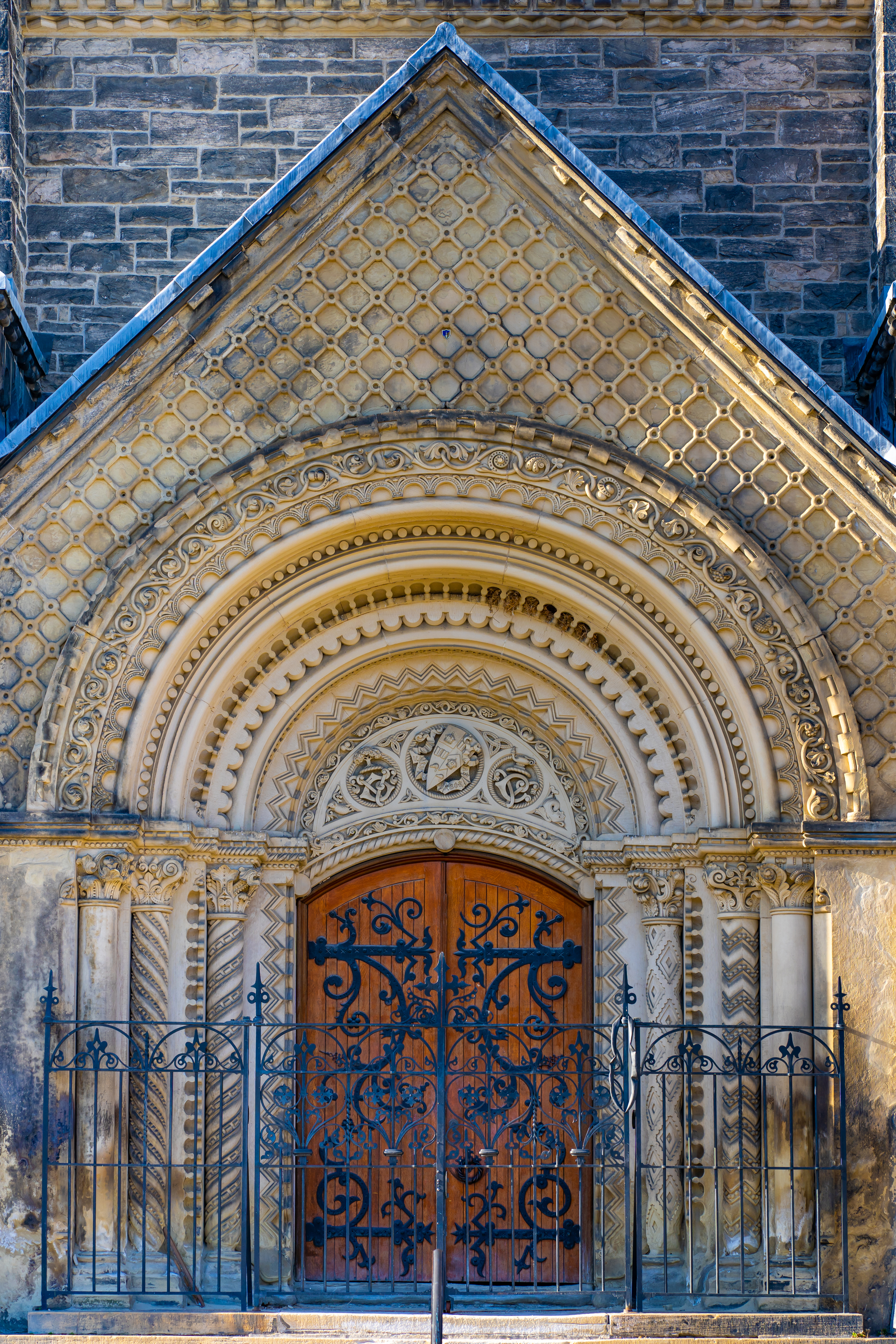
The south entrance

The main building of University College, built between 1856 and 1859, is a centrepiece of the St. George campus designed by architects Frederick William Cumberland and William George Storm. The selection of architectural styles was the result of "a tangle of disagreements and concessions, political as well as artistic", including the college's emphasis on freedom from denominational control. Cumberland met the requirements asked of him after taking part on a research and experience based trip to Europe in February 1856: "This course of action was consistent with Victorian architectural practice when new public buildings were being planned, which was to carefully study applicable building forms and adapt them, to the requirements of the job at hand. The design committee led by Cumberland initially designed a Gothic structure, but Governor General Edmund Walker Head disliked the style and suggested Italian instead, later changing his preference to Byzantine.

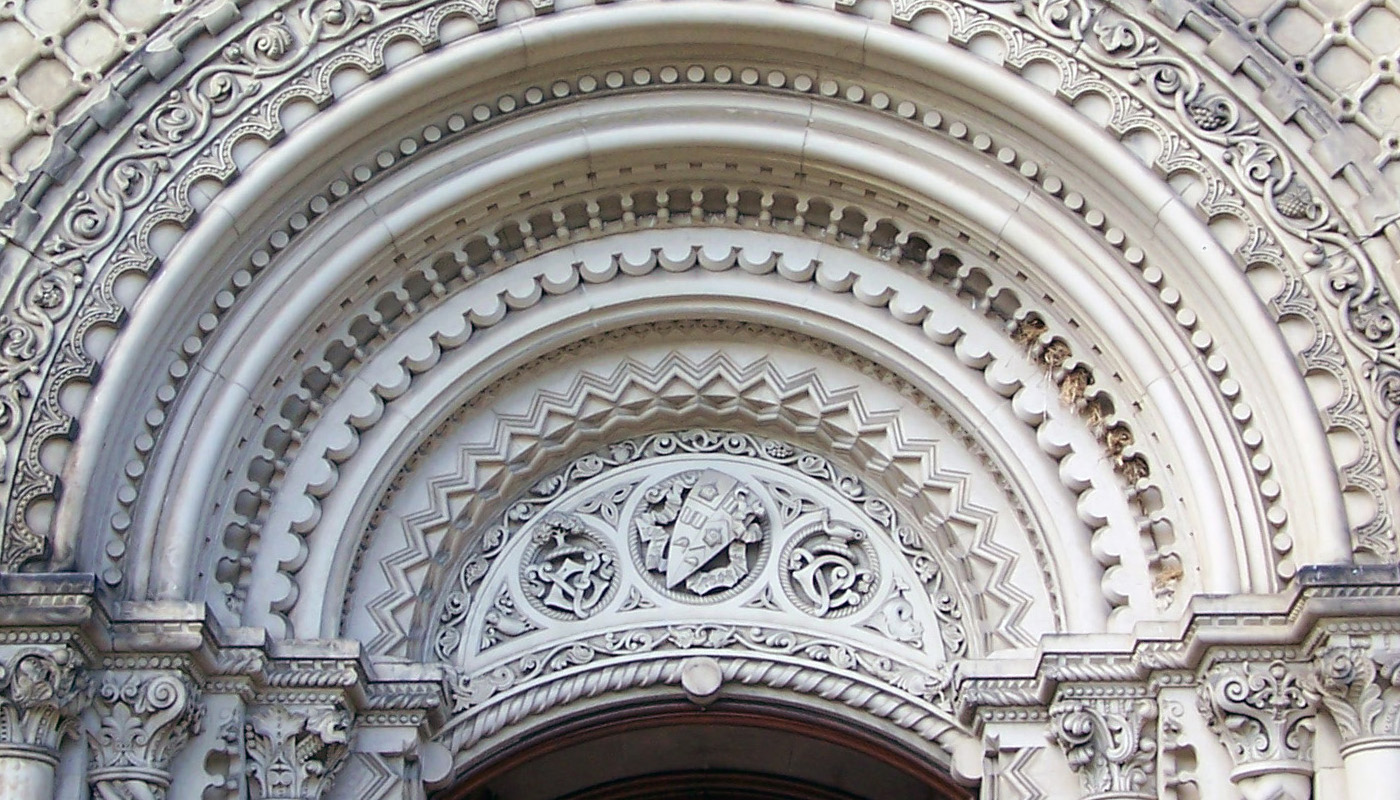
Detail of an ornate arch over the south entrance

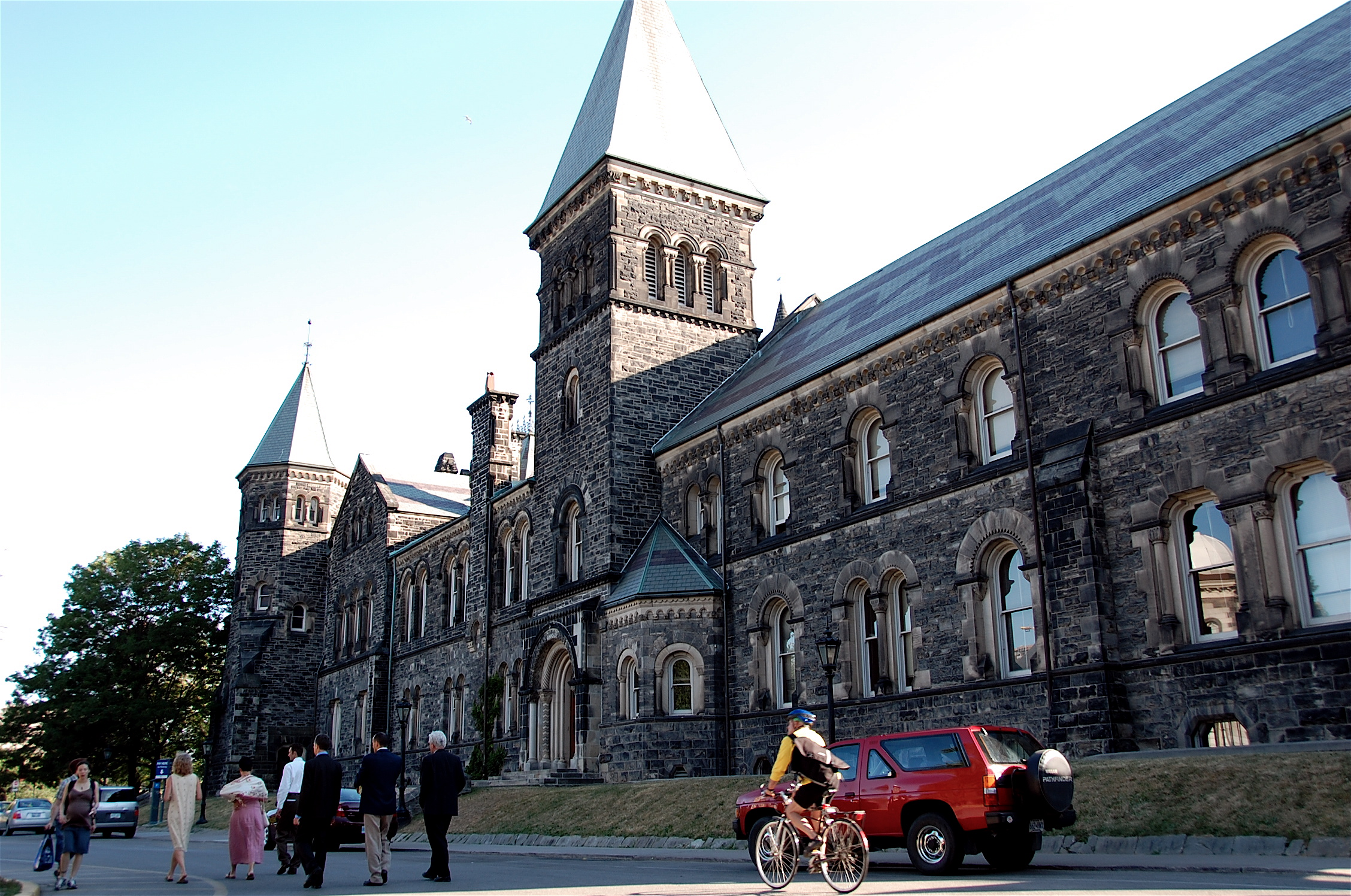
The East Wing was swiftly restored after suffering extensive fire damage in 1890.

The design committee would eventually include Norman, Romanesque Revival, and "faint traces of Byzantium and the Italian palazzo" styles in the design. In particular, the Byzantine, Norman and early English styles were deemed "fitting for educational institutions". Cumberland chose Norman Romanesque as the main influence because he thought it was the most appreciate for the topography in Canada. To achieve a picturesque approach, Cumberland ignored the classical symmetry and deliberately gave an asymmetrical architectural expression. The building was an unconventional combination of varied parts incorporating British design for educational structures in England and Ireland.

Like most Romanesque buildings, University College has extremely thick masonry walls, built of many types of brick and stone layered upon each other. The main materials include wood, stone, brick, slate, iron, mortar, and tile. Only about one third of the exterior is stone, with the rest being a very pale yellow brick produced at a brickyard on Yonge Street. University College has the characteristic arched and rounded windows as well as huge, cavernous facades. A major feature of University College is arches laid out in series and sets. The arches are semicircular, and consist of small columns that provide the structural support to hold up vaults on the side of walkways. There is much ornamentation, especially in the form of stone carvings, liberally applied on the walls, arches, columns and façades of the building. Carved images include nature, animals, mysterious creatures as well as the college shield and motto. The building also features several stained glass windows, including the rose window by Robert McCausland.

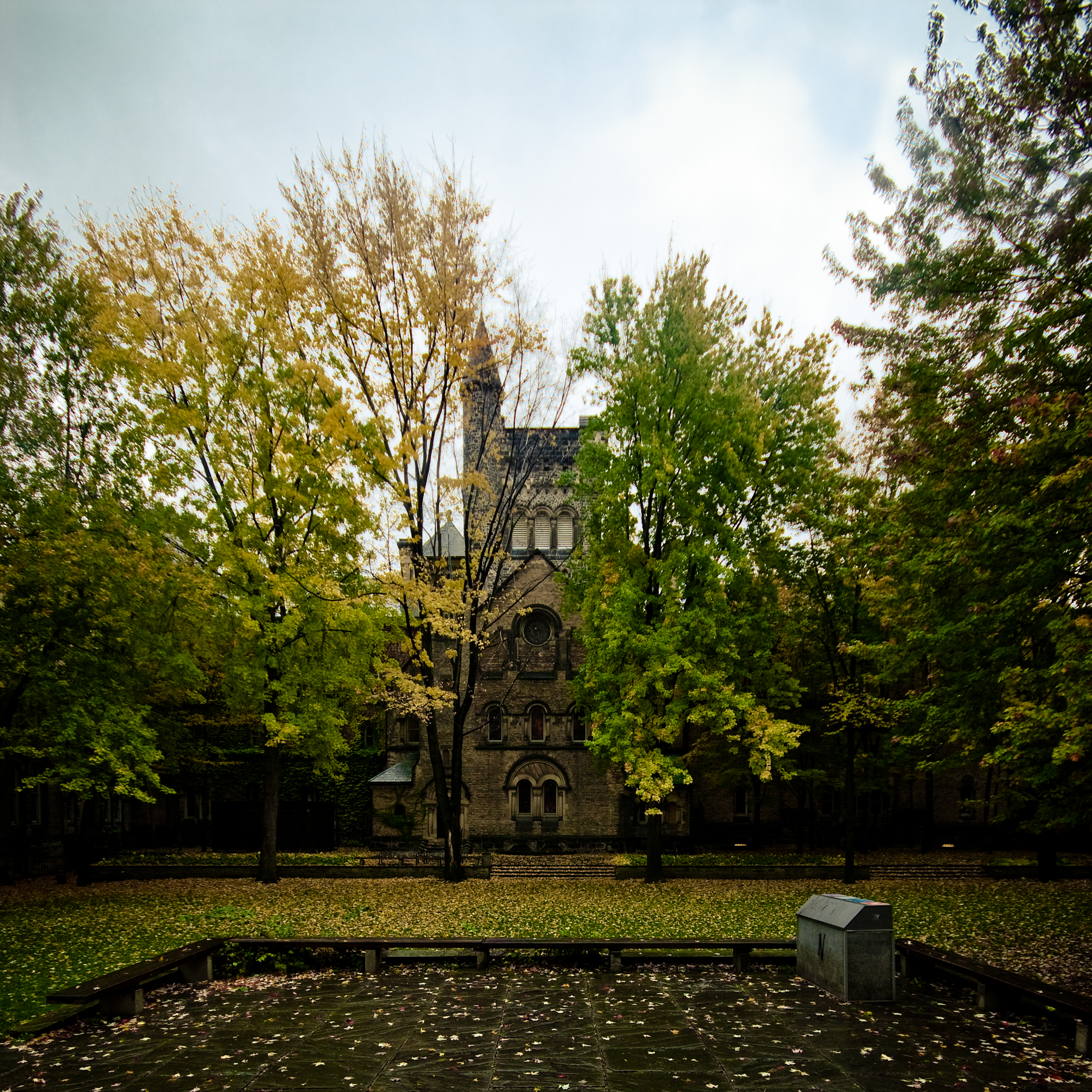
Inside the college quadrangle

Some of the basic original layout plans remain at University College today. The focal point of the structure is at the south façade, where the stone tower at the centre of the composition contains the main entrance of the college. The quadrangle and cloisters are enclosed within elaborately carved walls faced with stone, "felicitously sited amid landscaped grounds". Until the Laidlaw Wing was completed in the 1960s, University College was a U-shaped structure that was open on the north end. Before the fire of 1890, the building was laid out such that the east wing provided access to the convocation hall, the museum and the library, and contained an entrance to the quadrangle. Residences and dining halls, classrooms, and public reading rooms were on the west range of the structure. The chemistry laboratory was relocated at the southwest range, in the present Croft Chapter House (named after Henry Holmes Croft, the university's first chemistry professor), because it was more logical than in the first study which was in the north. Today, the west wing is no longer used as living quarters, which are now provided by the college's three dedicated residential halls, while the convocation functions have long since been moved to Convocation Hall.

=== Revitalization ===
The historic University College building underwent a major revitalization beginning in January 2018. The revitalization project included: improving the accessibility of the building, relocating the University College Library to its original location in the East Hall, transforming the West Hall into a new event space called the Clark Reading Room, creating a conference centre in Croft Chapter House, and introducing a café called the Owlery located on the third floor outside of the Library.

=== University of Toronto Art Centre ===
The University of Toronto Art Centre, part of the university's art museum, is located in the Laidlaw Wing of University College's main building. It was opened in 1996 and houses the UC Art Collection which dates back to as early as the 19th century.

== Academics ==
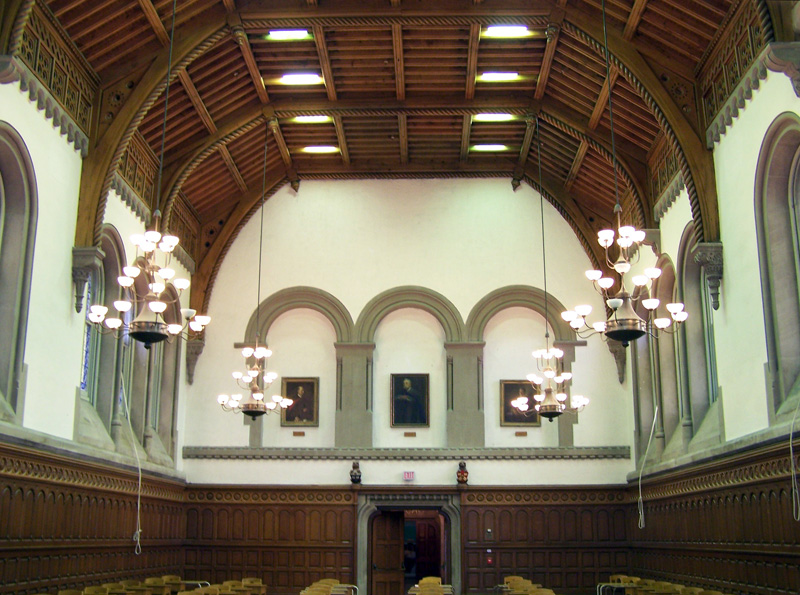
West Hall

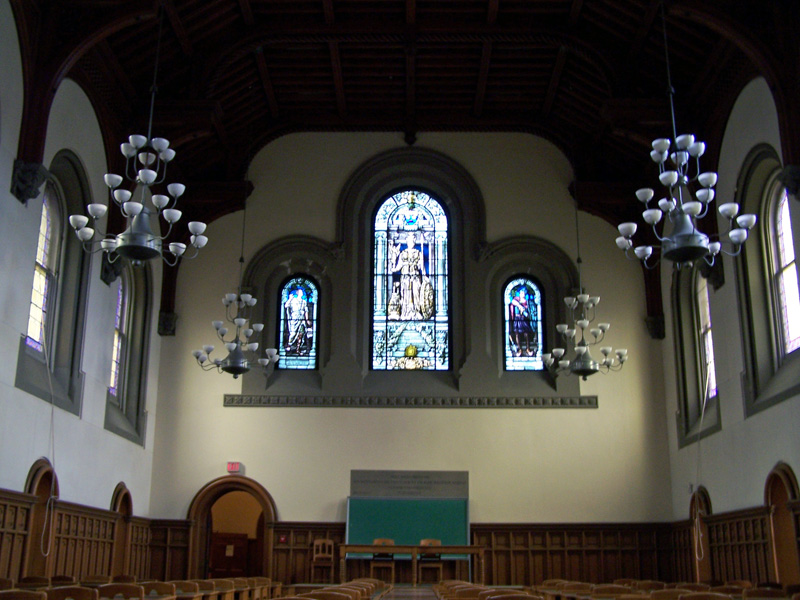
East Hall

The University College Council is the college's governing body, overseeing administrative, budgetary and academic matters. The principal, in addition to chairing the College Council, serves as the chief executive of the college. Student are represented on the College Council by the leaders of the Literary and Athletic Society and eight additional students.

University College houses several academic programs within the University of Toronto, further varied by major, minor and specialist concentrations, including Canadian studies, cognitive science, drama, health studies, and sexual diversity studies. The college houses a number of visiting fellows who take residence and office at the college.

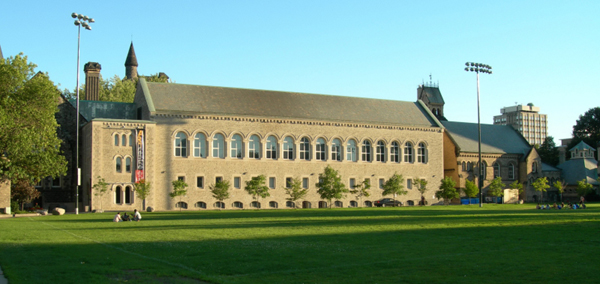
The former Laidlaw Wing that used to house the college library until UC's Revitalization project in 2018. The Wing remains the home of Art Museum at the University of Toronto.

University College hosts five sets of annual public lecture series. The Alexander Lectures, founded in 1928 and named for English professor W.J. Alexander, focuses on literature over four successive lectures. The Graham Lectures, established in 1930, explores scientific topics from astronomy to zoology in a non-technical manner. The F.E.L. Priestley Memorial Lectures in the History of Ideas are interdisciplinary, encompassing topics in social science and humanities such as literature, economics, history, geography, philosophy, theology, science, political science, as well as applied fields such as business, law, and medicine. The Stubbs Lecture, founded in 1988, focuses on Greek, Latin, or English literature. The Teetzel Lectures concentrates on art and architecture over three successive days.

=== Library ===
The Laidlaw Library was the main library of University College from the 1960s until the College's Revitalization project in 2018. The library has since moved back to its original location in the East Hall where the library was housed until the fire of 1890. The modern University College Library specialized in subjects related to the college's in-house academic programs in the humanities and social sciences. It comprises a main collection of over 20,000 volumes, including the Avie Bennett Collection and the Al Purdy Collection.

== Student life and traditions ==
=== Legend of Diabolos and Reznikoff ===
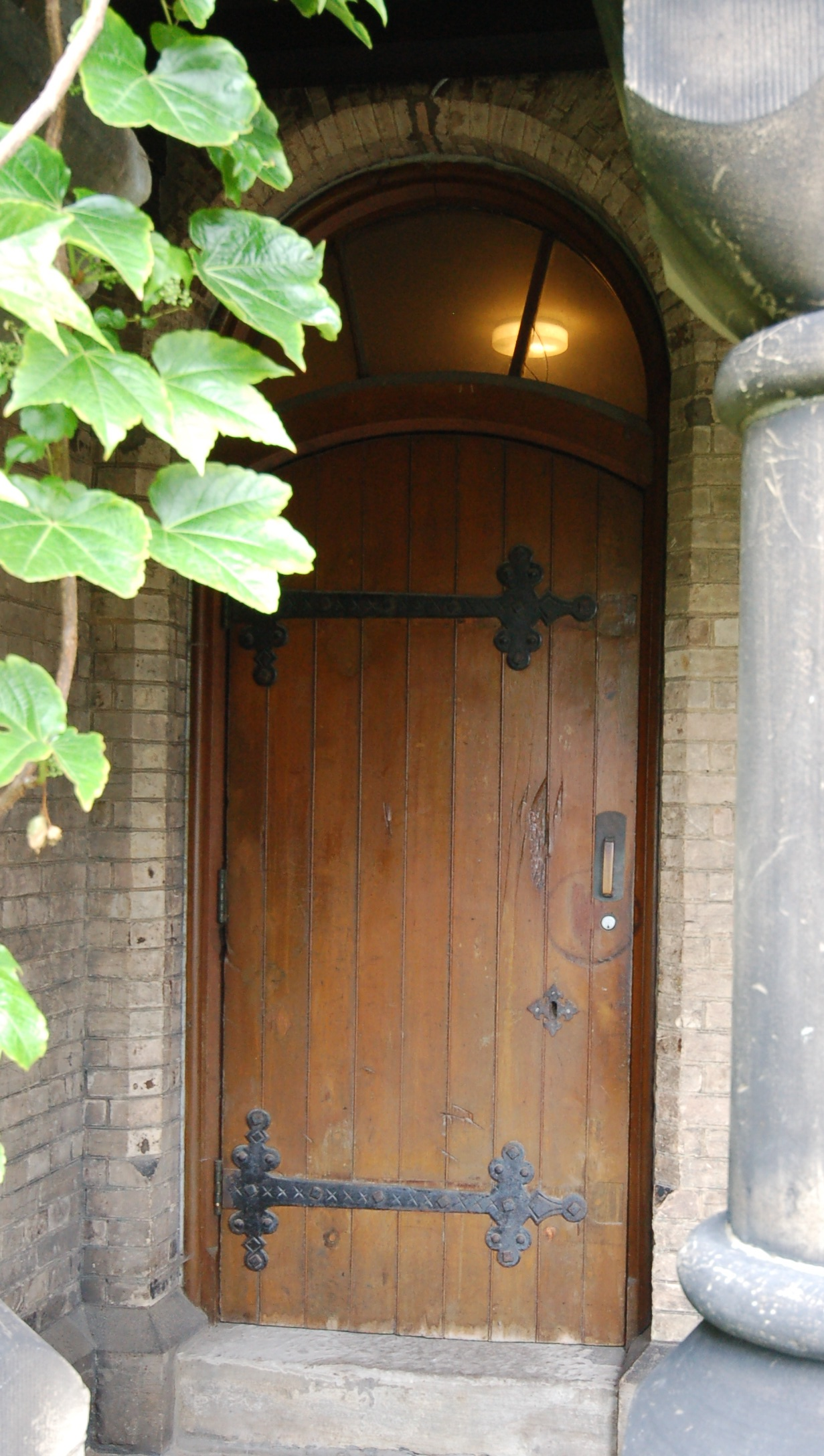
A damaged door that appears in the Diabolos and Reznikoff folktale

The famous ghost story of the University College, started from the carving "Crocodiles and vermin". The sculptor was a Russian, named Ivan Reznikoff. It is said that he was buried in the northeast corner of the quadrangle. Since then, his ghost is said to have been seen at regular intervals. The newel in the east staircase is a wooden Griffin. The griffin is a magical creature that is a mix of a lion and an eagle. Some students believe that touching the Griffin will bring good luck, such as passing their exams with great marks.

Diabolos' is University College's not-for-profit coffee bar that has been overseen by the Lit and student-run since 1966. It provides fair trade coffee, tea, vegan and vegetarian products to University College students. It is located in University College's Junior Common Room and is open during the academic school year on Monday to Thursday 8:30am – 6pm and Friday 8:30am – 4pm.

=== Literary and Athletic Society ===
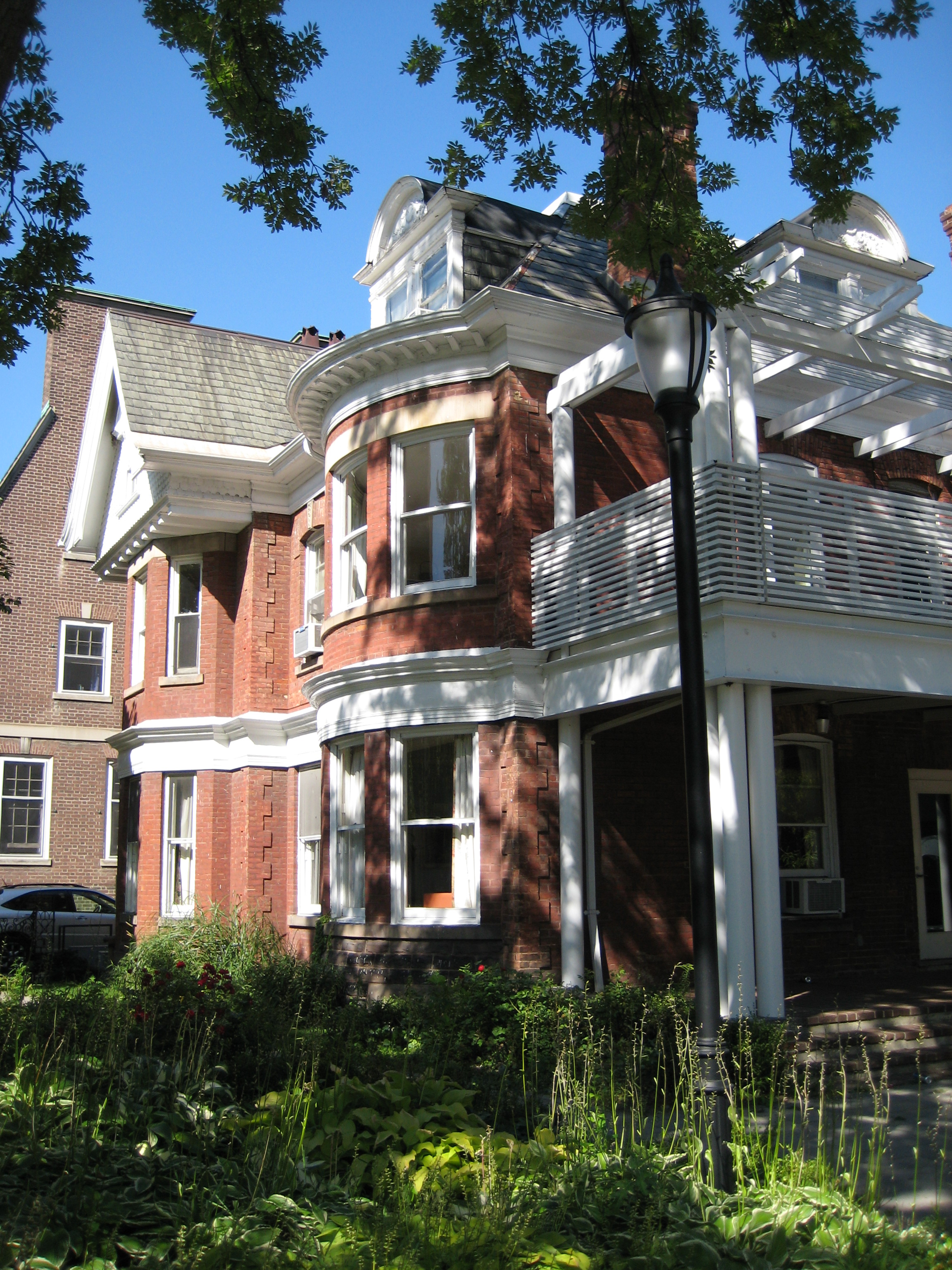
The University College Union

The University College Literary and Athletic Society, colloquially known as the 'Lit', is the oldest student government in Canada dating back to 1854. Established in 1854 as the Literary and Scientific Society and renamed The University College Literary and Athletic Society in 1921 it merged with the University College Women's Undergraduate Association in 1958 to become representative of all students attending the college.

Every student of University College is a member of the society. The Lit's mandate is to provide services, host events, facilitate student involvement, represent the student body, and foster a sense of community among students in the college. The Lit is also responsible for the student-run Diabolos' coffee bar, and the annual Fireball formal, commemorating the 1890 fire which destroyed the college. They also provide some support for Orientation Week, a week dedicated to help first-year students transition into university.

The Gargoyle, established in 1954, is the student newspaper of University College, named after the gargoyle statue in the college building. It is staffed by an editorial collective of undergraduate students, as well as a group of staff and regular contributors.

=== Residential halls ===
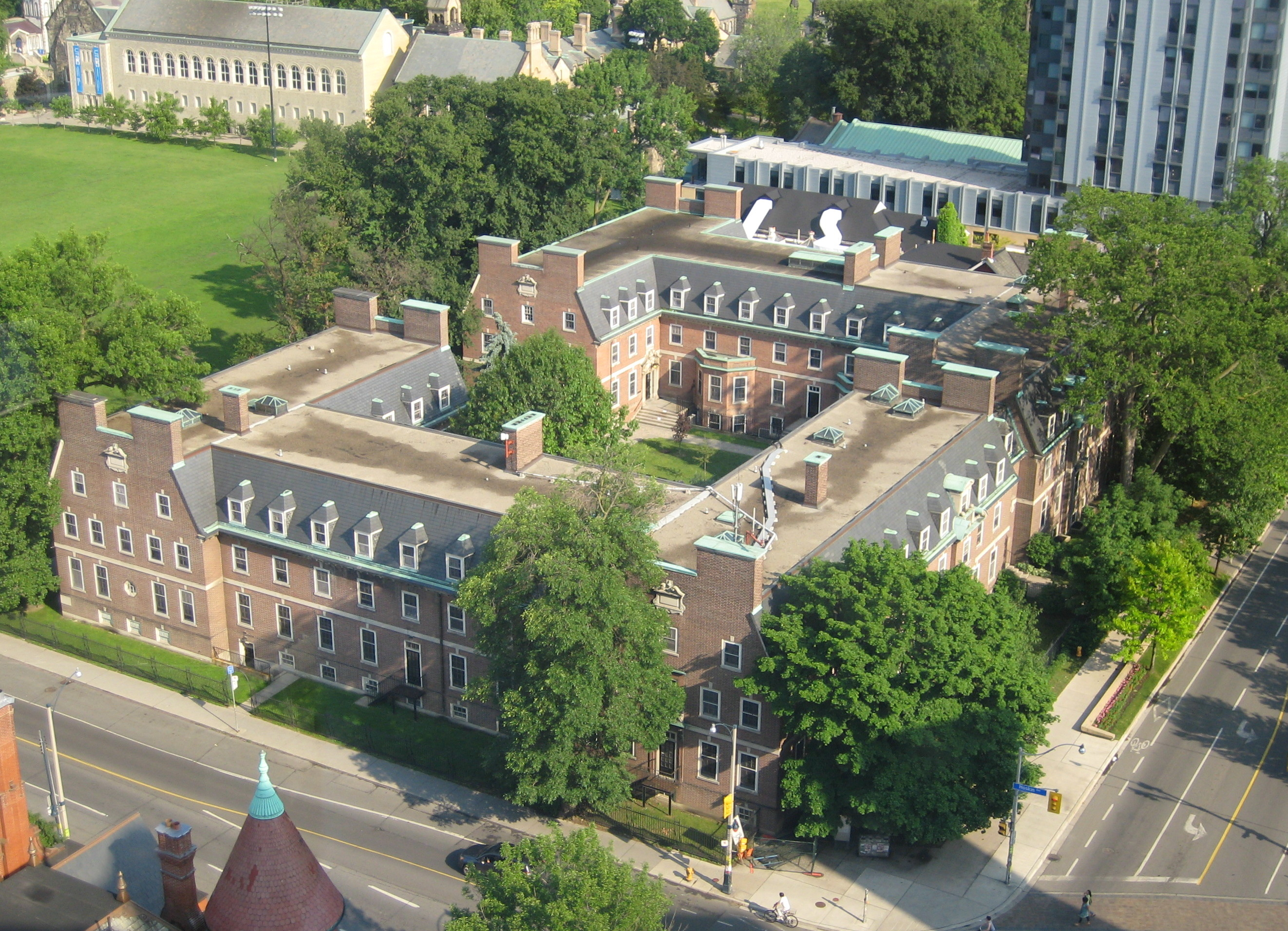
Whitney Hall (built 1930–31), women's residence designed by John M. Lyle

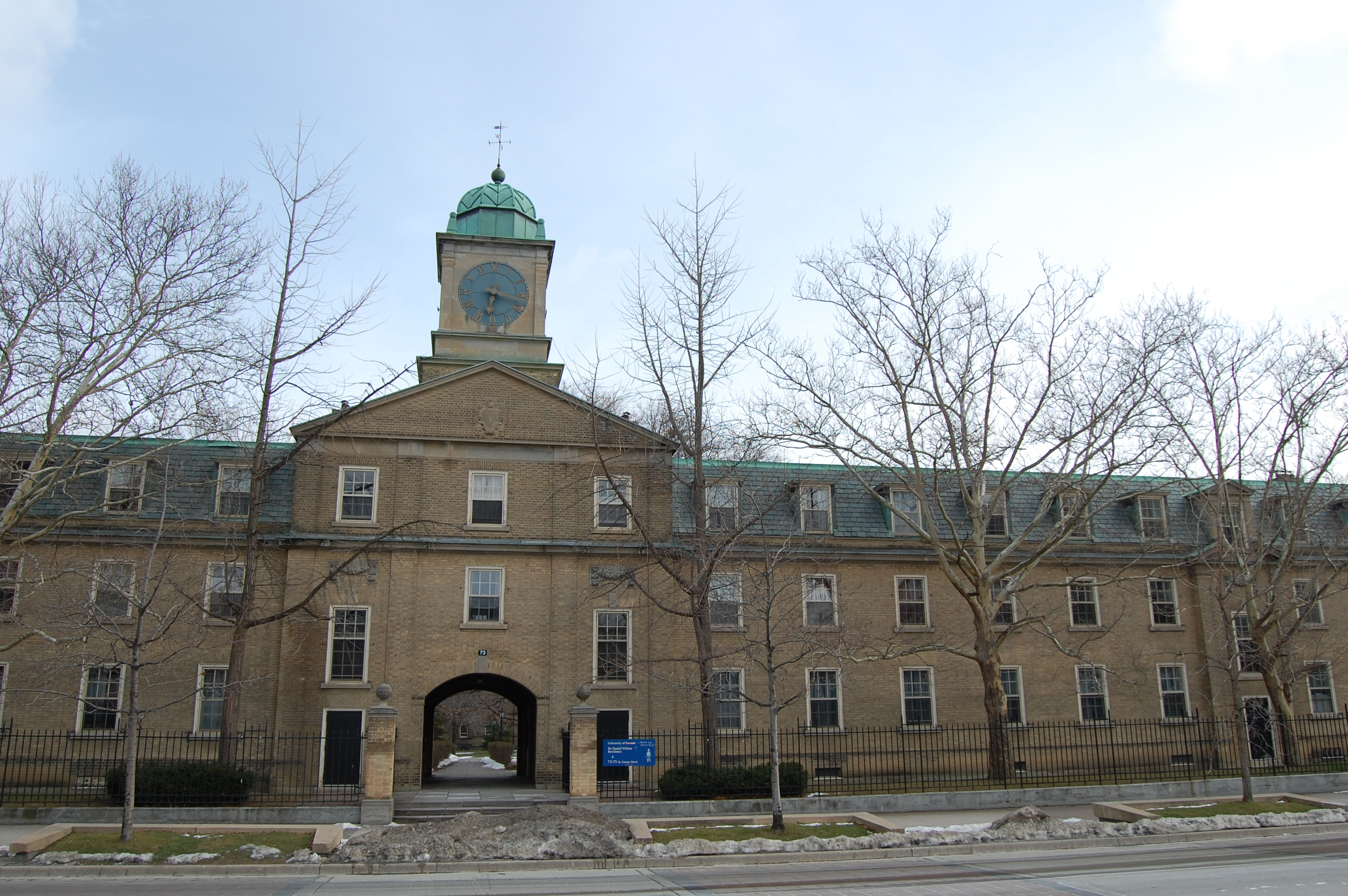
Sir Daniel Wilson Residence

The college's three residence buildings hold about 720 students, and are fully co-ed, although Whitney started out as the women's residence and Sir Daniel Wilson's as the men's. The current Sir Daniel Wilson Hall was built in 1954, and the original Whitney Hall was built in 1931. A third residence, Morrison Hall, was added in 2005. Demand for places is high for a number of reasons: most rooms are singles, the community life is accepting and diverse and most main academic buildings are right across the street. Off-campus students can participate in the residence community life by becoming associate members of one of the houses.

There are a total of fifteen residential divisions, known as "houses", in the residences. There are six houses within the Sir Daniel Wilson Residence: Jeanneret, Taylor, Wallace, Hutton, Loudon, and McCaul. In addition, there are four houses within the Whitney Residence: Cody, Mulock, Falconer, and Ferguson. Finally, there are five houses in Morrison Hall: Landsberg-Lewis, Perron, Wolfe, Bratty, and Langley. Hutton House is named after Maurice Hutton, a University College, University of Toronto classics professor. He also acted as Principal of University College, University of Toronto from 1901 to 1928. During 1906 and 1907 he was acting President of the university.

== Principals ==
The head of University College was originally known as the president, and was the de facto head of the University of Toronto upon the UC's establishment as its sole teaching college in 1853. Following The University Act, 1901, the office of president of the University of Toronto was re-established as a separate role, and the head of UC was henceforth called the principal. The current officeholder is professor Markus Stock, who has served as the 17th principal of University College since January 1, 2020.

The following is a list of principals of University College. Those titled president are marked with an asterisk (*).

1. John McCaul* (1853–1880)
2. Sir Daniel Wilson* (1880–1892)
3. James Loudon* (1892–1901)
4. Maurice Hutton (1901–1928)
5. Malcolm William Wallace (1928–1944)
6. Sidney Earle Smith (1944–1945)
7. William Robert Taylor (1945–1951)
8. François Charles Archile Jeanneret (1951–1959)
9. Moffatt St. Andrew Woodside (1959–1963)
10. Douglas Valentine LePan (1964–1970)
11. Archibald Cameron Hollis Hallett (1970–1977)
12. George Peter Richardson (1977–1989)
13. Lynd Wilks Forguson (1989–1997)
14. Paul Joseph Perron (1997–2005)
15. Sylvia Beth Bashevkin (2005–2011)
16. Donald C. Ainslie (2011–2019)
17. Markus Stock (2019–present)

== Notable alumni ==
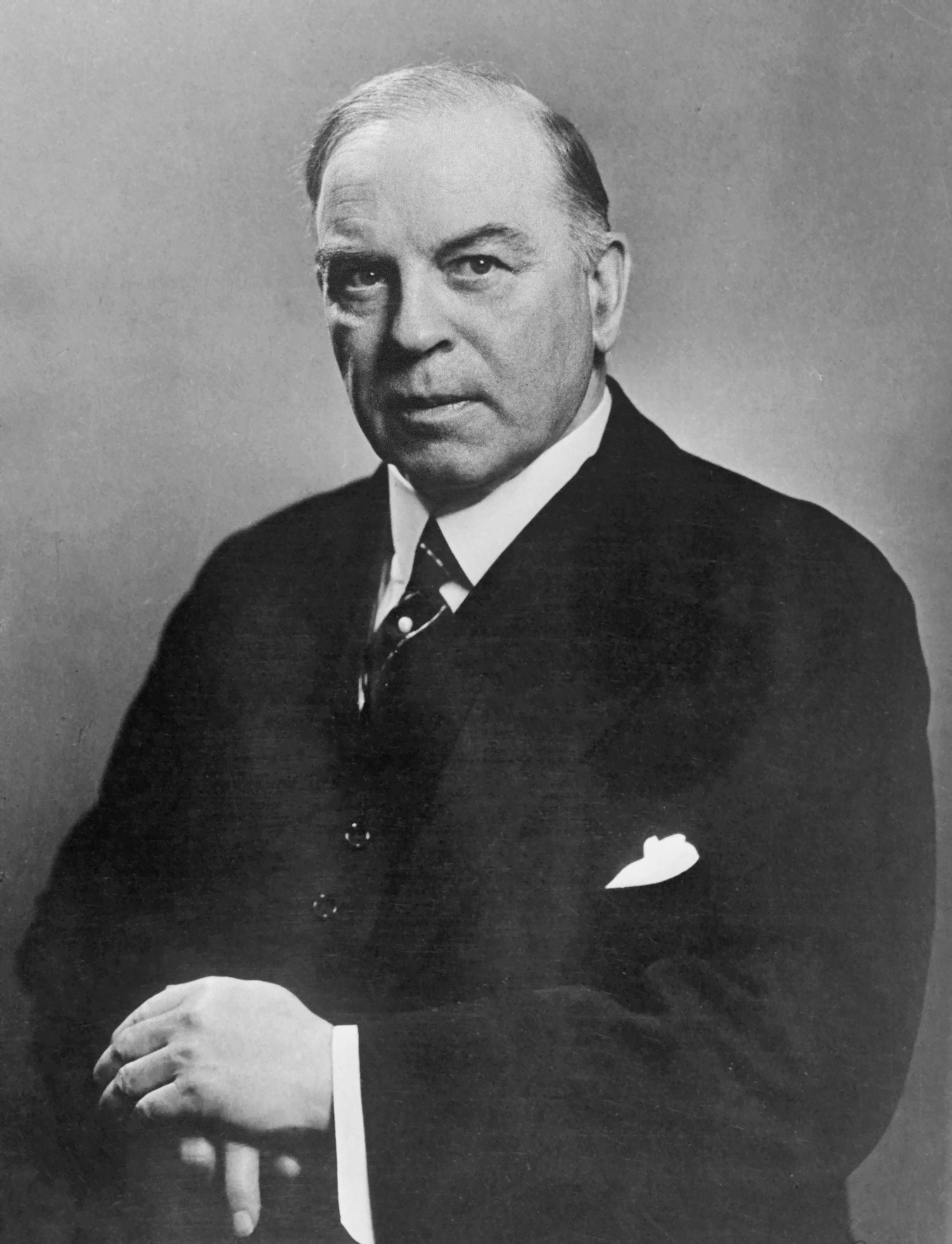
William Lyon Mackenzie King

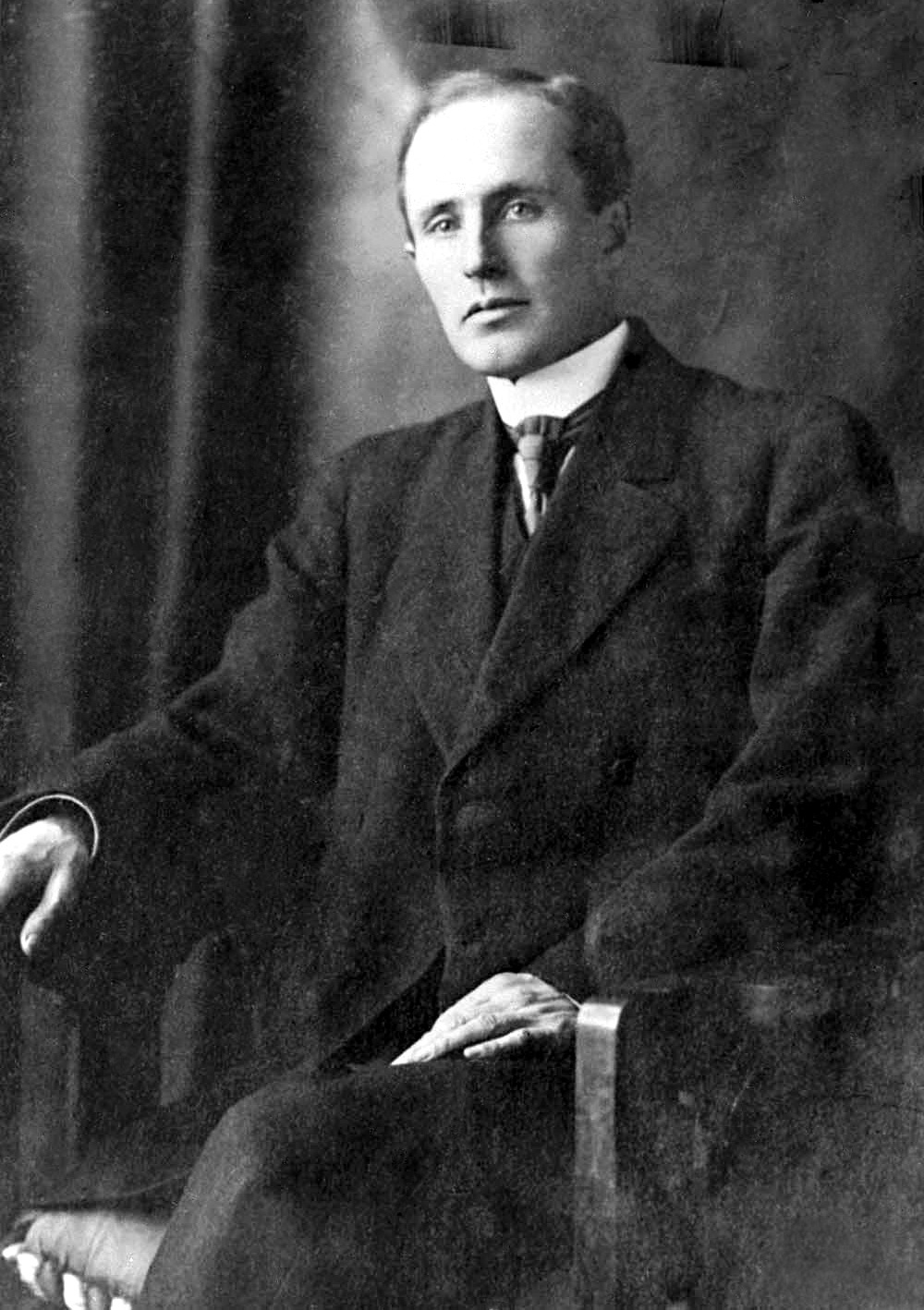
Arthur Meighen

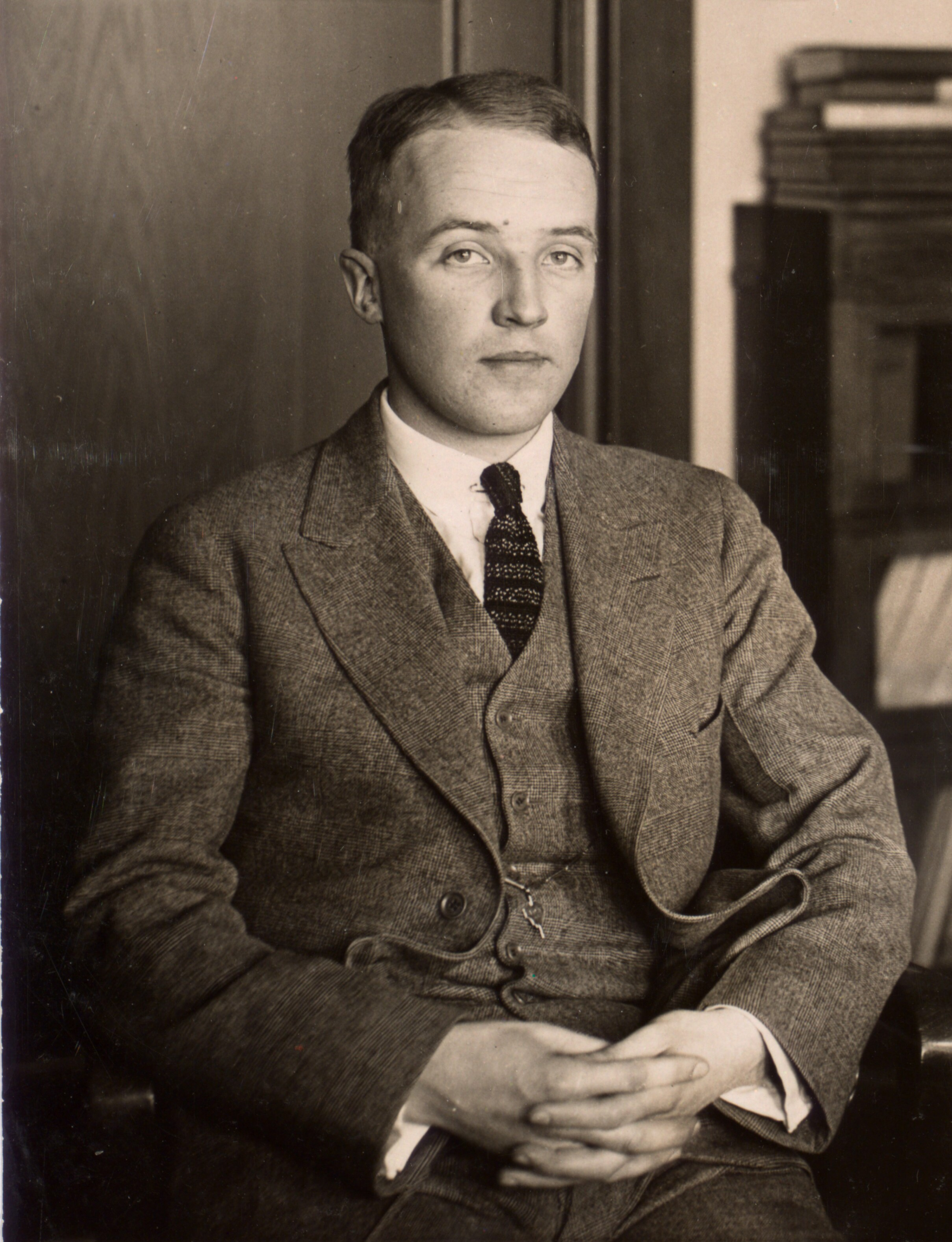
Charles Best

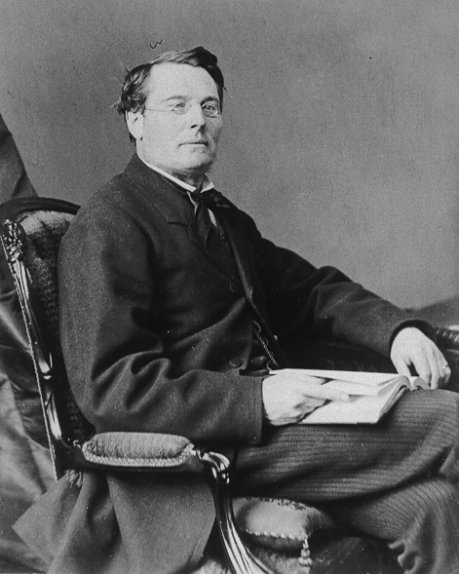
Edward Blake

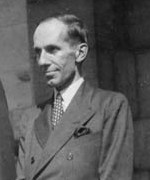
Vincent Massey

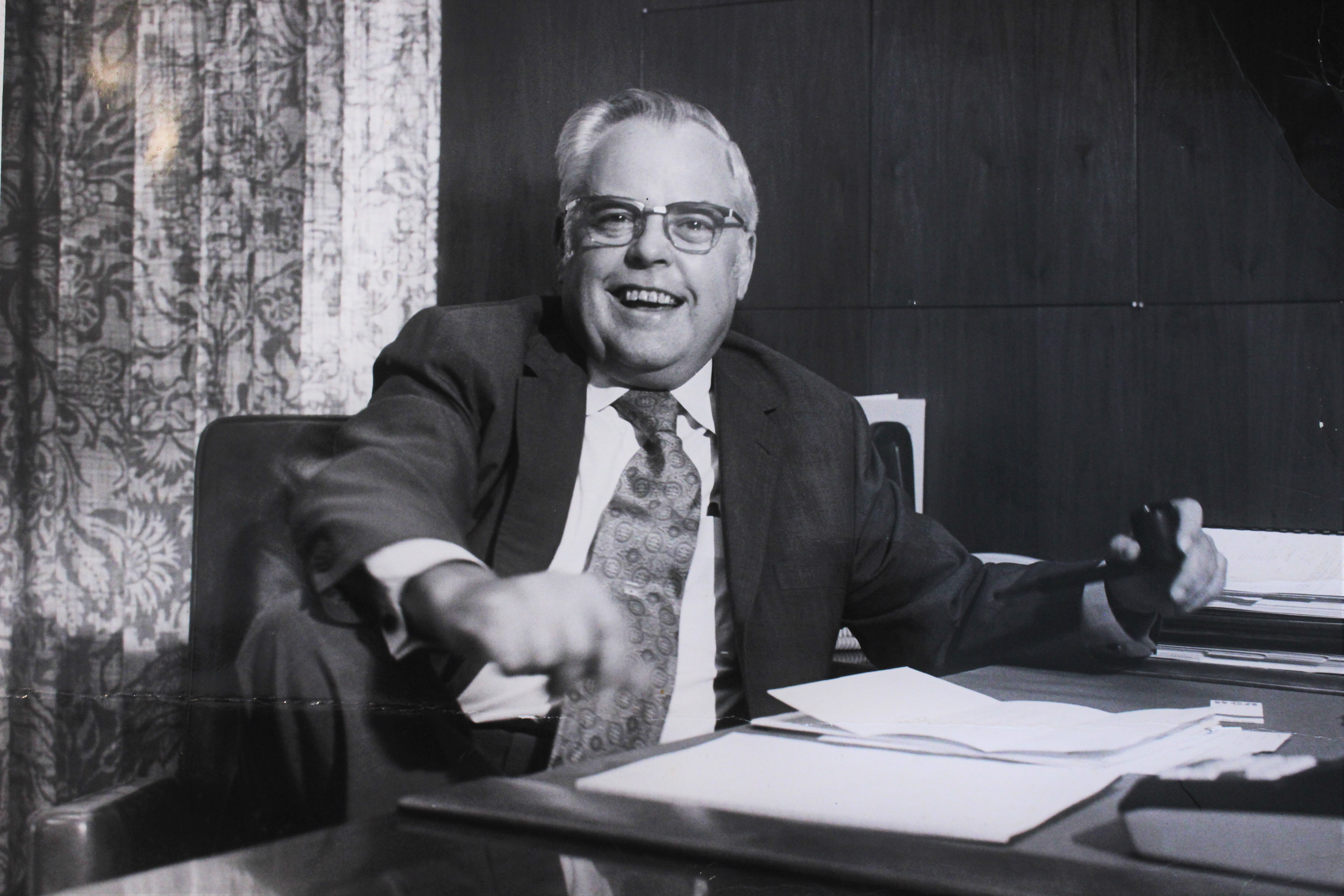
James Hillier

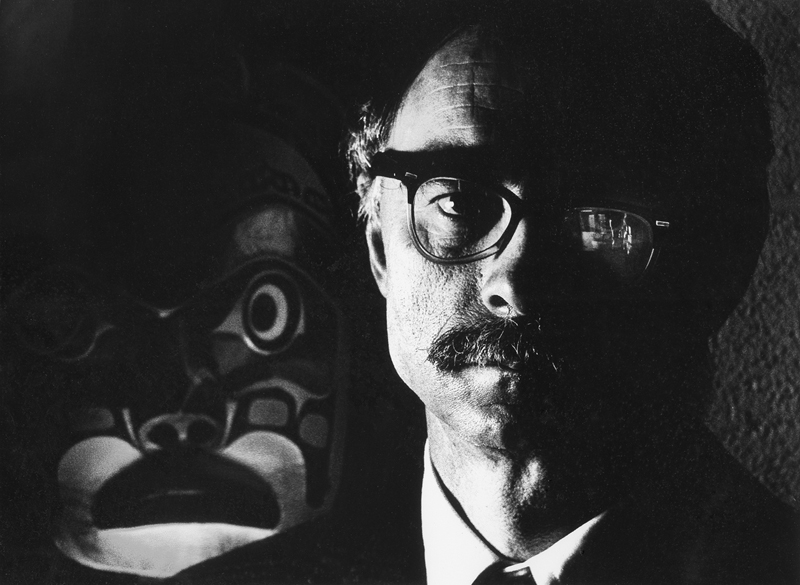
James Reaney

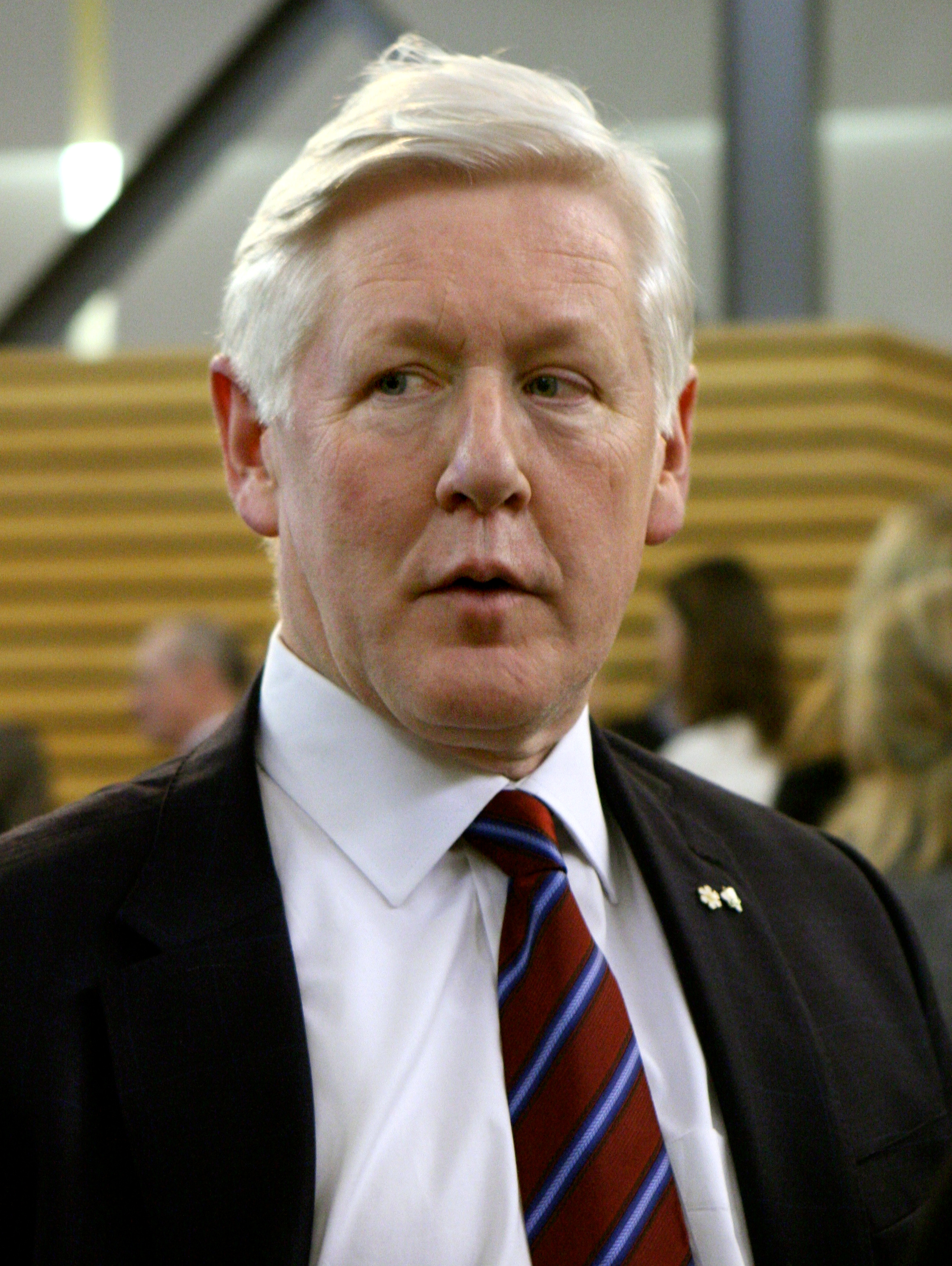
Bob Rae

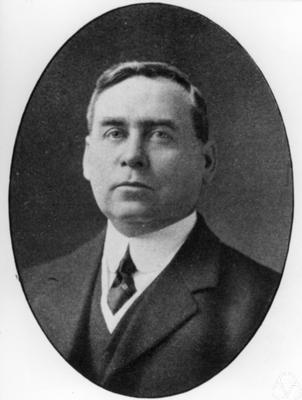
John Charles Fields

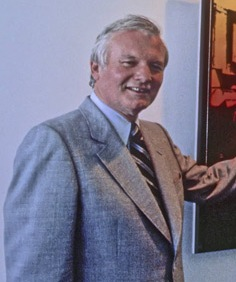
Bill Davis

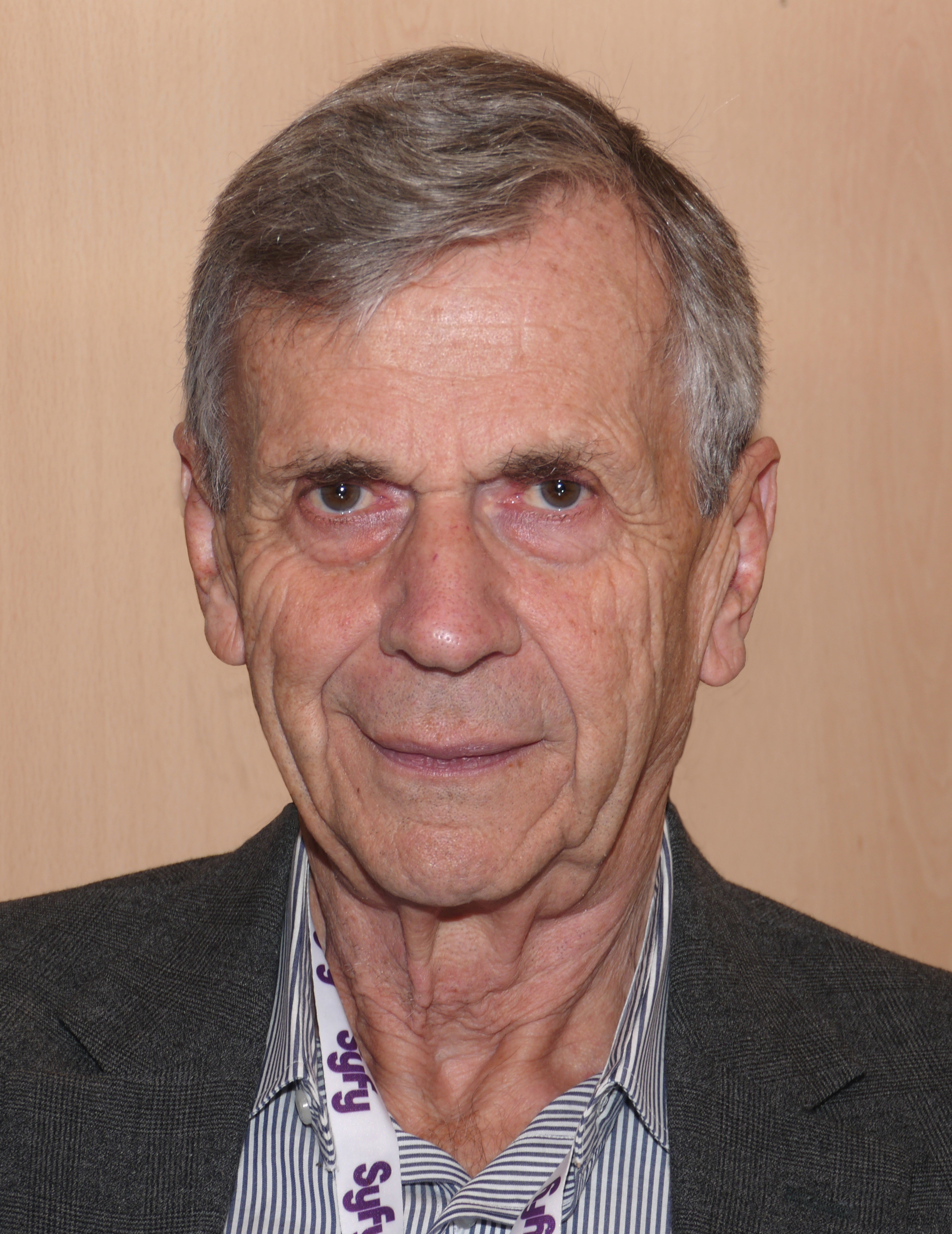
William B. Davis

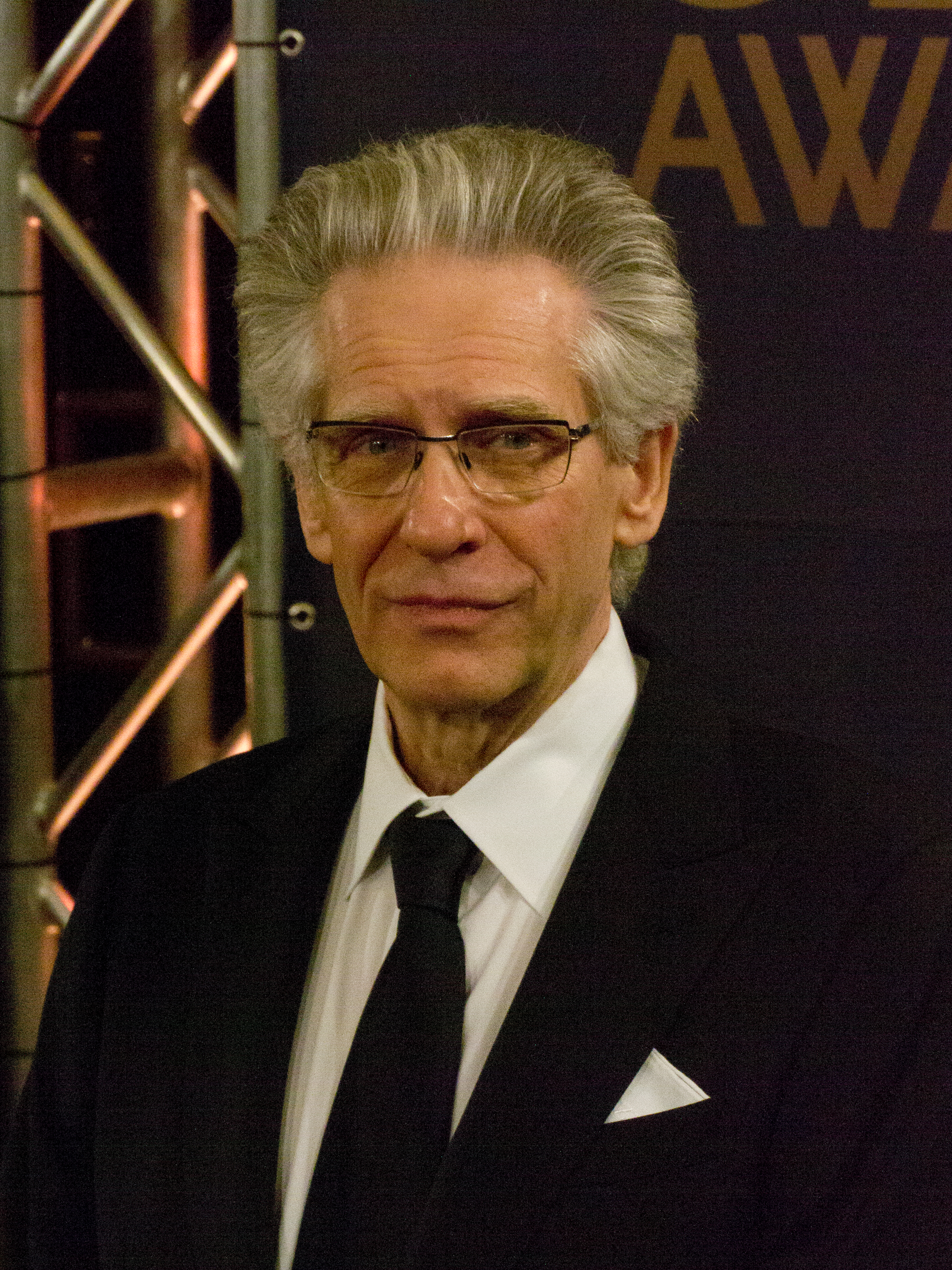
David Cronenberg

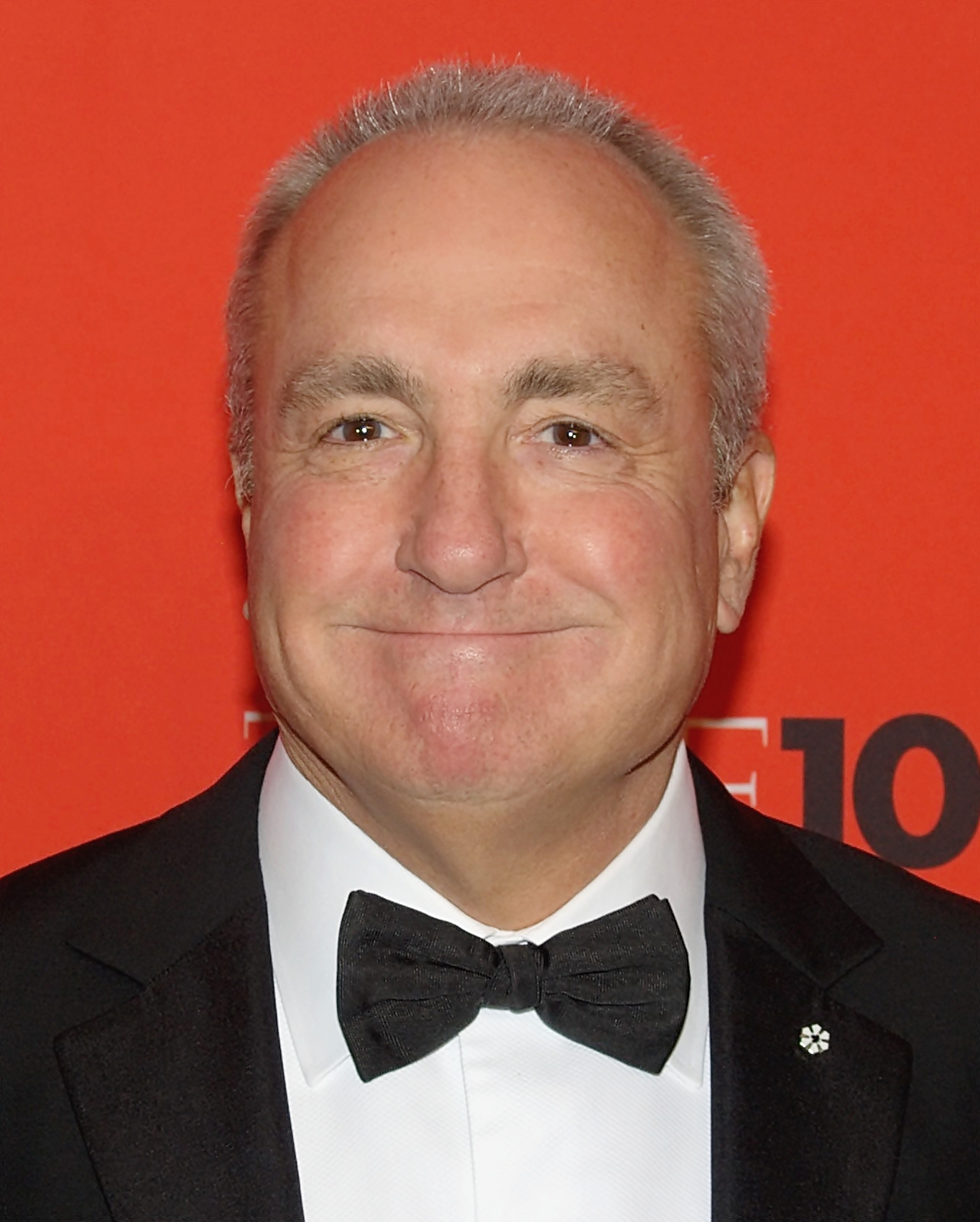
Lorne Michaels

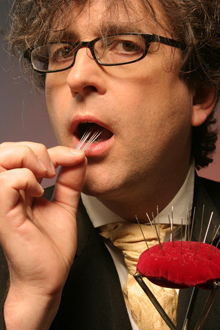
David Ben

Arts and media

- David Ben, class of 1985, magician.
- David Cronenberg, class of 1967, director.
- William B. Davis, class of 1959, actor, The X-Files.
- Bonnie Fuller, class of 1977, editorial chief of American Media (Star, Shape, Men's Fitness, Natural Health).
- Dr. Arthur Hiller, class of 1947, filmmaker, Academy Award Winner, 2002.
- Charmion King, class of 1947, actor.
- Ted Kotcheff, class of 1952, executive producer, Law and Order SVU.
- Selena Li, class of 2010, TVB actress
- Tim Long, class of 1992, comedy writer, The Simpsons, Late Night with David Letterman.
- Lorne Michaels, class of 1966, producer, Saturday Night Live.
- Charles Pachter, class of 1964, artist.
- Paul Shaffer, class of 1971, musician, Saturday Night Live, Late Show with David Letterman.
- Johnny Wayne, class of 1940 & Frank Shuster, class of 1939, comedians.
- Paul Sun-Hyung Lee, actor, Kim's Convenience.
- Patrick Watson class of 1951, First independent CBC Chairman, writer, television host interviewer producer and director "[This Hour Has Seven Days].

Business

- Edmund Clark, class of 1969, president & CEO, TD Bank Financial Group.
- William Francis, class of 1950, founder, Auto Trader.
- Dr. Warren Goldring, class of 1949, former chair, AGF Management Ltd.
- Paul Jones, class of 1972, former publisher, Maclean’s.
- Sergio Marchionne, class of 1978, CEO, Fiat.
- Earl Orser, class of 1950, former president & CEO of London Life.
- David A. Rosenberg, class of 1983, economist.

Education

- May Bell, Ella Gardiner, Margaret Langley, Margaret Brown, Catherine Brown, class of 1885, first women to graduate from the University of Toronto.
- Dr. Anne Golden, class of 1962, former director of the United Way, CEO Conference Board of Canada.
- Dr. Amir Hussain, class of 1987, Editor of the Journal of the American Academy of Religion.
- Dr. Walter Kohn, class of 1945, physicist, Nobel laureate.
- Prof. Michael Marrus, class of 1963, former dean, School of Graduate Studies, University of Toronto.
- Dr. Lorna Marsden, class of 1968, former president and vice-chancellor, York University.
- Dr. Rose Wolfe, chancellor emerita, University of Toronto.

Law

- The Hon. Rosalie Abella, class of 1967, judge, Supreme Court of Canada.
- Charles Dubin, class of 1941, commissioner, Dubin Inquiry.
- Susan Eng, class of 1972, lawyer and former chair of the Metropolitan Toronto Police Services Board.
- Brian Greenspan, class of 1968, criminal lawyer.
- Edward Greenspan, class of 1965, criminal lawyer.
- The Hon. Nicholas Kasirer, judge, Supreme Court of Canada.
- The Hon. Horace Krever, class of 1951, commissioner, Inquiry on the Blood System in Canada.
- The Hon. Bora Laskin, class of 1933, former Chief Justice of Canada.
- The Hon. Sidney Linden, class of 1961, commissioner, Ipperwash Crisis Inquiry.
- Sir Francis Vallat, Legal Adviser to the Foreign and Commonwealth Office

Literature and journalism

- Barbara Black, class of 1963, columnist.
- Matt Cohen, class of 1963, novelist.
- Joy Fielding, class of 1966, author, Missing Pieces.
- Barbara Frum, class of 1959, journalist.
- Camilla Gibb, class of 1991, author, Mouthing the Words, The Petty Details of So-an-so’s Life.
- Naomi Klein, journalist and author of No Logo and The Shock Doctrine (attended; did not graduate).
- Jennifer Lanthier, class of 1985, children's author, journalist.
- Stephen Leacock (class of 1891), humorist.
- Avi Lewis, class of 1988, politician and former broadcaster.
- Stephen Lewis, class of 1959, diplomat, author.
- Heather Mallick, class of 1981, columnist, The Toronto Star.
- Rona Maynard, class of 1972, former editor, Chatelaine.
- John McCrae, class of 1894, soldier and author, “In Flanders Fields”.
- Farley Mowat, class of 1949, author, Never Cry Wolf.
- Michael Ondaatje, class of 1965, author, The English Patient, In the Skin of a Lion.
- Marilyn Powell, class of 1960, broadcaster.
- Kate Taylor, class of 1983, columnist, The Globe and Mail.

Government

- The Hon. Edward Blake class of 1854, former Premier of Ontario.
- Sarmite Bulte, class of 1974, former M.P., Parkdale-High Park.
- The Hon. Tony Clement, class of 1983, M.P., Parry Sound-Muskoka, Minister of Industry.
- The Hon. Bill Davis, class of 1951, former Premier of Ontario.
- The Hon. Bob Kaplan, class of 1958, former Solicitor General of Canada.
- Arthur Meighen, class of 1896, former Prime Minister of Canada.
- William Lyon Mackenzie King, class of 1895, former Prime Minister of Canada.
- Charles Vincent Massey, class of 1910, first Canadian-born Governor General.
- The Hon. Bob Rae, class of 1969, former Premier of Ontario.
- Saul Rae, class of 1936, diplomat.

Science and medicine

- Dr. Charles Best, class of 1921, co-developer of insulin.
- Wilfred Bigelow, class of 1935, surgeon and pacemaker pioneer.
- John Charles Fields, class of 1884, mathematician and founder of the Fields Medal.
- Dr. James Hillier, class of 1937, physicist and electron microscope pioneer.
- Sir John Cunningham McLennan, class of 1892, first person to earn a PhD in physics from the University of Toronto.
- Ilya Sutskever, class of 2005, computer scientist, co-creator of AlexNet and co-founder of OpenAI.
- Jacob Tsimerman, class of 2006, mathematician and Fields Medal laureate.

Athletics

- Abigail Hoffman, class of 1968, Olympian, track and field.
- Kay Worthington, class of 1983, Olympic gold medalist, rowing
