= Humphrey Waldock =

British jurist and international lawyer

Sir Humphrey Waldock CMG OBE QC
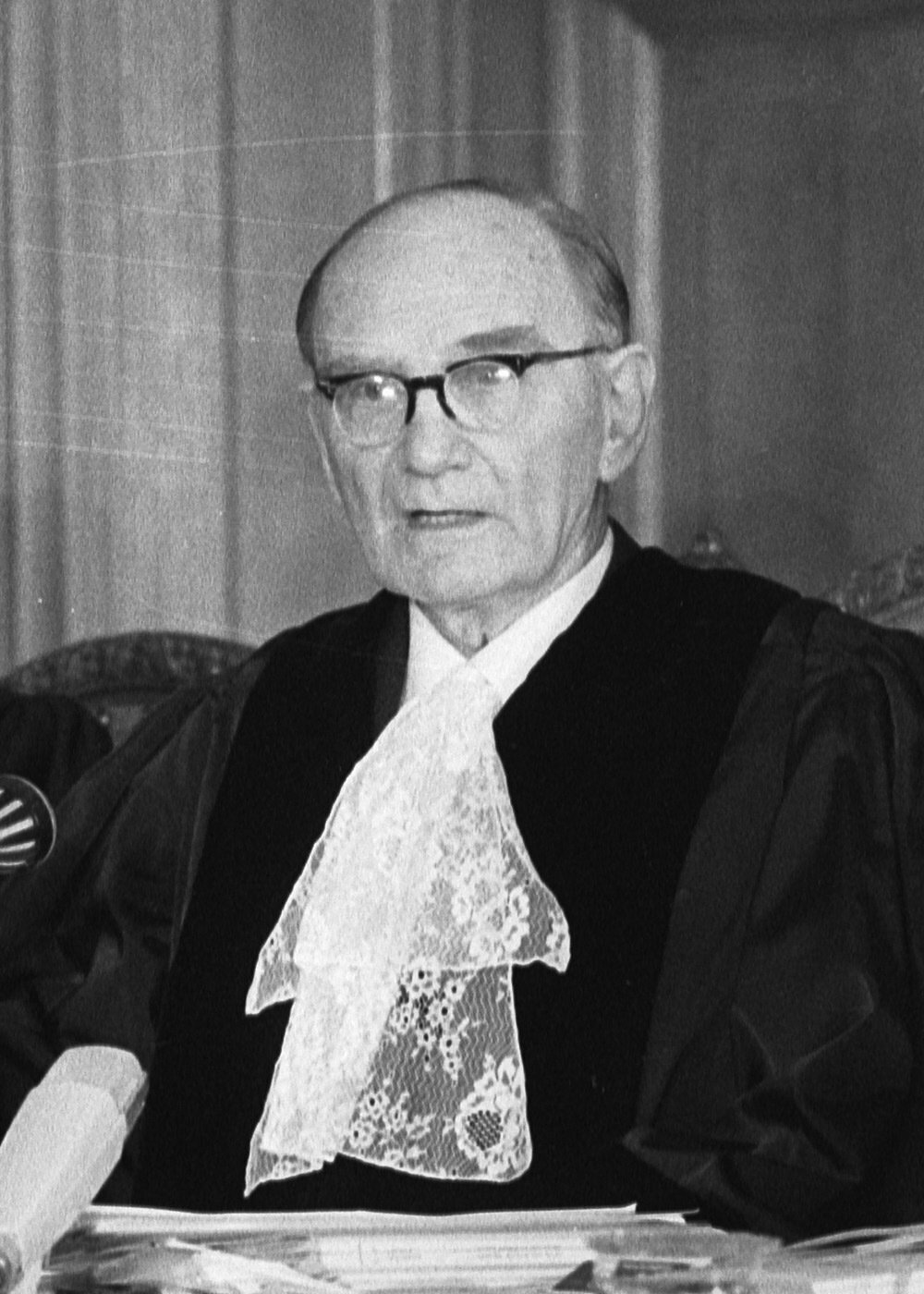

President of the International Court of Justice
- In office 1979 – 15 August 1981
- Vice President: Taslim Olawale Elias
- Preceded by: Eduardo Jiménez de Aréchaga
- Succeeded by: Taslim Olawale Elias

Judge of the International Court of Justice
- In office 1973 – 15 August 1981
- Preceded by: Gerald Fitzmaurice
- Succeeded by: Robert Yewdall Jennings

President of the European Court of Human Rights
- In office 5 May 1971 – 21 January 1974
- Preceded by: Henri Rolin
- Succeeded by: Giorgio Balladore Pallieri

Judge of the European Court of Human Rights
- In office 1973 – 15 August 1981
- Preceded by: The Lord McNair
- Succeeded by: Sir Gerald Fitzmaurice

Personal details
- Born: Claud Humphrey Meredith Waldock; 13 August 1904 Colombo, Ceylon
- Died: 15 August 1981 (aged 77) The Hague, the Netherlands
- Profession: Barrister
- Title: Chichele Professor of Public International Law

Academic background
- Education: Brasenose College, Oxford (BA, BCL)

Academic work
- Institutions: All Souls College, Oxford
- Doctoral students: Ian Brownlie

Sir Claud Humphrey Meredith Waldock, CMG, OBE, QC (13 August 1904 – 15 August 1981) was a British jurist and international lawyer.

== Education ==
Waldock was born to a tea planter and his wife in Colombo, Ceylon. He attended Uppingham School and went up to Brasenose College, Oxford and earned a hockey blue in 1926. He took a second-class in the classics moderations in 1925 and graduated with a second-class BA in jurisprudence in 1927 and BCL in 1928.

== Career ==
Waldock was called to the bar at Gray's Inn in 1928. He practised on the Midlands Circuit for a short period of time, but returned to Oxford. He was a fellow at Brasenose and a lecturer in law from 1930 to 1947; and a lecturer in law at Oriel College from 1930 to 1939. He took silk in 1951 and was knighted in 1961. He was appointed OBE in 1942 and CMG in 1946.

His academic interest was initially in land law and equity, but following the Second World War Waldock joined a branch of the Admiralty, of which he headed and achieved the grade of principal assistant secretary in 1944. In this role, Waldock participated in the Royal Navy's diplomatic relations with other countries. He left this role in 1945 and returned to Oxford, developing a part-time practice in international cases before the International Court of Justice which he maintained until 1973. Wadlock was Chichele Professor of Public International Law at All Souls College, Oxford, from 1947 to 1979. He was editor of The British Year Book of International Law from 1955 to 1974. He was elected bencher of Gray's Inn in 1956 and its treasurer in 1971.

He served on the United Nations' International Law Commission from 1961 to 1972. He was the Special Rapporteur on the Law of Treaties from 1962 to 1966, was president in 1967, and served as the Special Rapporteur on the Succession of States in respect of Treaties from 1968 to 1972. The six reports he completed on behalf of the ILC on the law of treaties continue to be leading sources of law for international law.

Waldock served as the British judge in the European Court of Human Rights from 1966 until 1974 and in the International Court of Justice from 1973 until 1981. He was the President of the ICJ from 1979 until his death in 1981.

The British lawyer and historian A. W. B. Simpson recalled that Waldock told him that international law was diplomacy under a different name and that with regard to the operations of the International Court of Justice, "it's all done in the corridors."

== Personal life ==
Waldock married Ethel Beatrice Williams in 1934, with whom he had one son, Humphrey Edward, and one daughter, Jill. Towards the end of his life, Waldock lived in Lathbury Road, North Oxford. In his Who's Who entry, he expressed an interest in cricket, tennis, fishing and shooting. He died in The Hague in 1981 of an apparent heart attack.

== Publications ==
Waldock wrote books on the law of mortgages, the use of force, general public international law and dozens of articles on international law.

== Arms ==
Coat of arms of Humphrey Waldock

Notes
Displayed in a painting at Gray's Inn.
Crest
A demi panther Sable holding in the dexter paw a branch as in the arms and resting the sinister paw on an estoile Or.
Escutcheon
Or an estoile Sable on a chief Sable two branches of palm in saltire Gold.
Motto
Non Sine Pulvere Palma
