= Eo nomine =

Legal term

Eo nomine is a Latin legal term meaning "by that name".

== State Sovereignty ==
The United States Supreme Court uses it in the context of sovereign immunity. In Alden v. Maine Justice Souter, for the dissent, wrote that according to natural law a sovereign, like a state, could not be sued in its own court based on a right it created, "A state would be subject to a suit eo nomine in its own courts on a federal claim."

== International Trade and the Harmonized Tariff Schedule Classification ==
"An eo nomine classification is usually a well-known name or term and includes all items in that class of articles, regardless of form, unless the language of a particular provision limits the scope so as to exclude certain items. For example, it was determined that, as an eo nomine designation, “radio receivers” as a class is not limited to entertainment broadcast receivers, but instead includes all forms of radio receivers. Parts are not generally included in an eo nomine classification unless the relevant HTSUS provision specifies that parts are included. Use does not generally factor into an eo nomine classification though it may be used to establish identity."

Use of eo nomine is used extensively by the United States Court of International Trade.

Interest eo nomine is often called "interest as interest" and cannot be pleaded for as damages in a plaintiff's claim.
