= Gerald Fitzmaurice =

British barrister and judge (1901–1982)

Sir Gerald Fitzmaurice GCMG QC
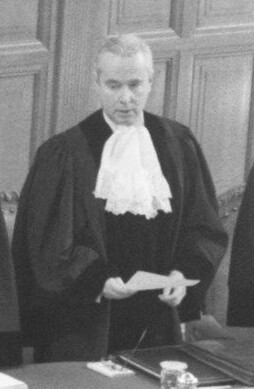
- Gerald Fitzmaurice in 1961

Judge of the European Court of Human Rights
- In office 1975–1980
- Preceded by: Sir Humphrey Waldock
- Succeeded by: Sir Vincent Evans

Judge of the International Court of Justice
- In office 1960–1973
- Preceded by: Sir Hersch Lauterpacht
- Succeeded by: Sir Humphrey Waldock

Member of the International Law Commission
- In office 1955–1960
- Preceded by: Sir Hersch Lauterpacht
- Succeeded by: Sir Humphrey Waldock

Personal details
- Born: Gerald Gray Fitzmaurice; 24 October 1901 Storrington, Sussex
- Died: 7 September 1982 (aged 80)
- Parents: Sir Maurice Swynfen Fitzmaurice (father); Mabel Gertrude Gray (mother)
- Education: Malvern College
- Alma mater: Gonville and Caius College, Cambridge (BA, LLB)

Sir Gerald Gray Fitzmaurice GCMG QC (24 October 1901 – 7 September 1982) was an English barrister and judge. He was a member of the Permanent Court of Arbitration between 1964 and 1973 and a Judge of the International Court of Justice between 1960 and 1973, before becoming a Judge of the European Court of Human Rights at Strasbourg in 1974.

== Early life and education ==
He was born on 24 October 1901, the eldest son of Vice-Admiral Sir Maurice Swynfen Fitzmaurice and Mabel Gertrude Gray, in Storrington, Sussex. He studied at Malvern College and at Gonville and Caius College, Cambridge, where he gained a Bachelor of Arts and Bachelor of Laws in 1924. While at Gonville and Caius, Fitzmaurice was a pupil of Arnold McNair. Fitzmaurice took a first in both parts of the law tripos in 1923 and 1924.

== Career ==
He was called to the bar at Gray's Inn in 1925 and worked as a legal advisor to the Foreign Service in 1929. He was seconded to the Ministry of Economic Warfare as a legal advisor from 1939 to 1943, where he was tasked developing an Allied legal network to restrict Germany's seaborne trade. He spent time as the Second Legal Advisor at the Foreign Office from 1945 until 1953, having been invested as a Companion of the Order of St Michael and St George in 1946.

In 1945, he attended the San Francisco Conference as a legal advisor to the UK delegation and was involved in drafting the UN Charter; he attended the Paris Peace Conference in 1946. He was part of the in 1946 and again from 1948 to 1949. Fitzmaurice was the UK Counsel to the International Court of Justice at The Hague between 1948 and 1954. He served as the Senior Legal Advisor to the Foreign Office between 1953 and 1960. In 1954 he was advanced to a Knight Commander of the Order of St Michael and St George. Fitzmaurice was a member of the International Law Commission of the UN between 1955 and 1960 and contributed to the four Geneva Convention of the Law of the Sea adopted in 1958. He was the Special Rapporteur on the law of treaties. He took silk in 1957. From 1956 to 1960, he served president of the Grotius Society.

=== Judicial career ===
Fitzmaurice was a member of the Permanent Court of Arbitration between 1954 and 1980. In 1960, he left his position as Senior Legal Advisor to accept an appointment as judge at the International Court of Justice, completing Sir Hersch Lauterpacht's term who had died mid-term, and was re-elected for a full term in 1963; he served in the court until 1973. He was made a Knight Grand Cross of Order of St Michael and St George in 1960, and in 1961 was elected a Bencher of Gray's Inn.

In 1974, he was elected as Judge of the European Court of Human Rights at Strasbourg, a position he served in until 1980. During his long career in the law he received honorary degrees of Doctor of Law from the University of Edinburgh in 1970 and the University of Cambridge in 1972.

== Personal life ==
He married Alice Evelina Alexandra Sandberg on 15 September 1933 and the couple had two sons. He died in London on 7 September 1982 at the age of 80.

== Literature ==
- J. G. Merrills, Judge Sir Gerald Fitzmaurice and the discipline of international law, Kluwer Law International, 1998, ISBN 90-411-0538-7, 347 pages, url
