= University College Library (Toronto) =

Academic library of University College, Toronto

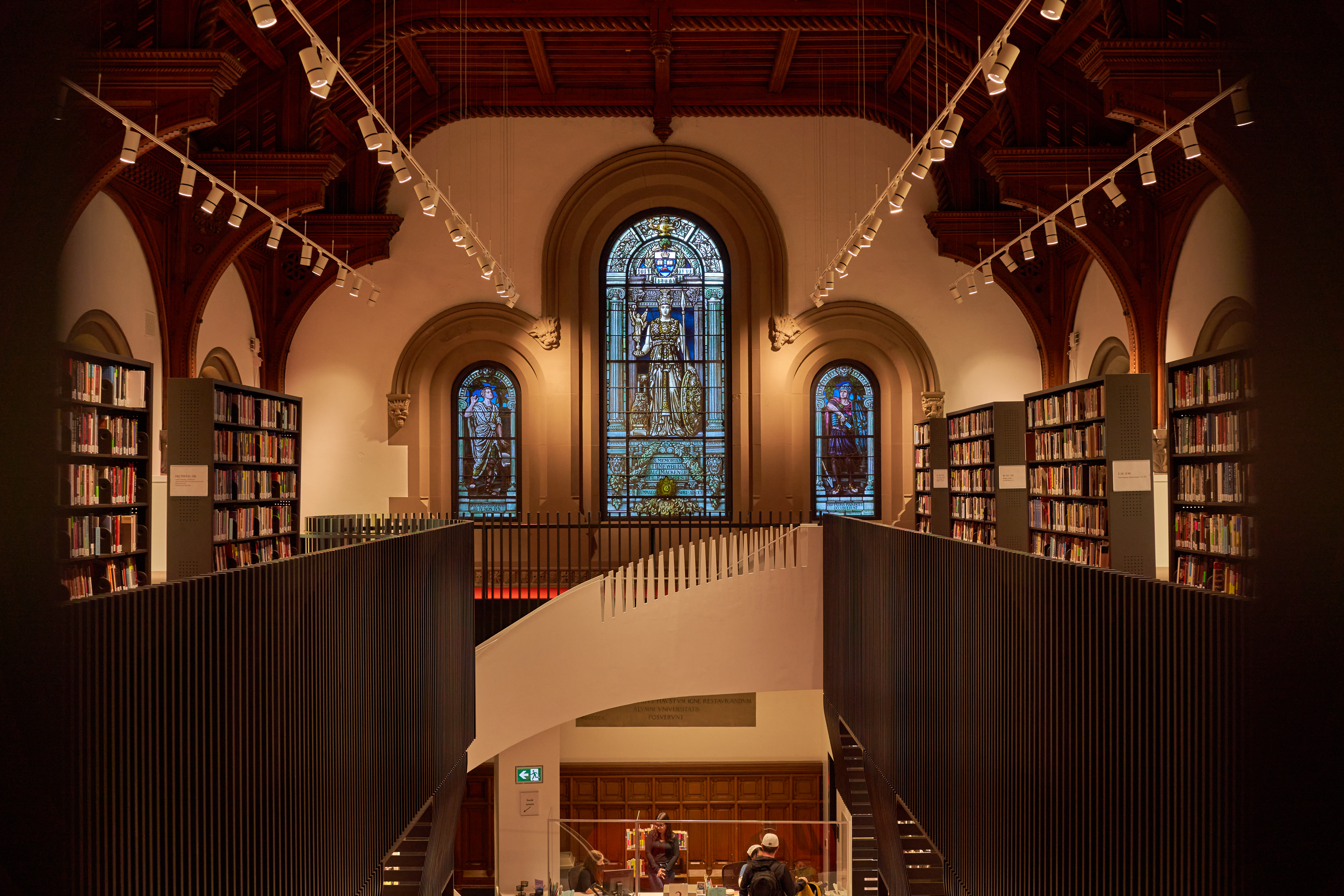
- The library's interior in 2023
- 43°39′46″N 79°23′43″W
- Location: University College, Toronto, Ontario, Canada
- Type: Academic library
- Established: 1843
- Architects: Mathers & Haldenby
- Branch of: University of Toronto Libraries

Collection
- Size: 35,000 title (2021)

Other information
- Website: Official website

The University College Library (UC Library), formerly known as the Laidlaw Library, is an academic library in Toronto, Ontario, Canada. It is the library of University College (UC), a constituent college of the University of Toronto on its St. George campus.

Since 1843, the library has been relocated several times throughout its history, and now resides in its original location within the east hall of the main college building. It is one of the oldest branches of the University of Toronto Libraries system.

== History ==
=== 1843–1890: Original location and fire ===
The original UC Library was established in 1843 and located in the southern east hall of the main University College building. A devastating fire on February 14, 1890 set the building ablaze and destroyed much of the east wing, including the library.

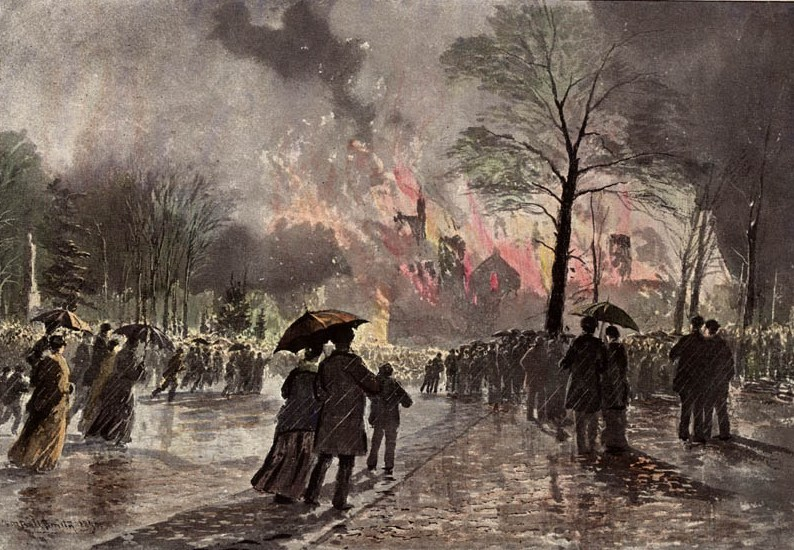
The University College fire of 1890, Dominion Illustrated

The fire spread rapidly when servants accidentally dropped two kerosene lamps on a wooden staircase at around 7 p.m. while preparing the illumination for an annual college exhibition. In Ottawa, Edward Blake, the university's chancellor and a Member of Parliament, interrupted his speech to inform the House of Commons, "The great institution, the crown and glory, I may be permitted to say, of the educational institutions in our country is at the moment in flames ... and is now, so far as its material fabric goes, a ruin tottering to the ground." Only about 100 books were rescued before the fire consumed more than 33,000 volumes at the college library.

=== 1890–2010s: Laidlaw Library ===
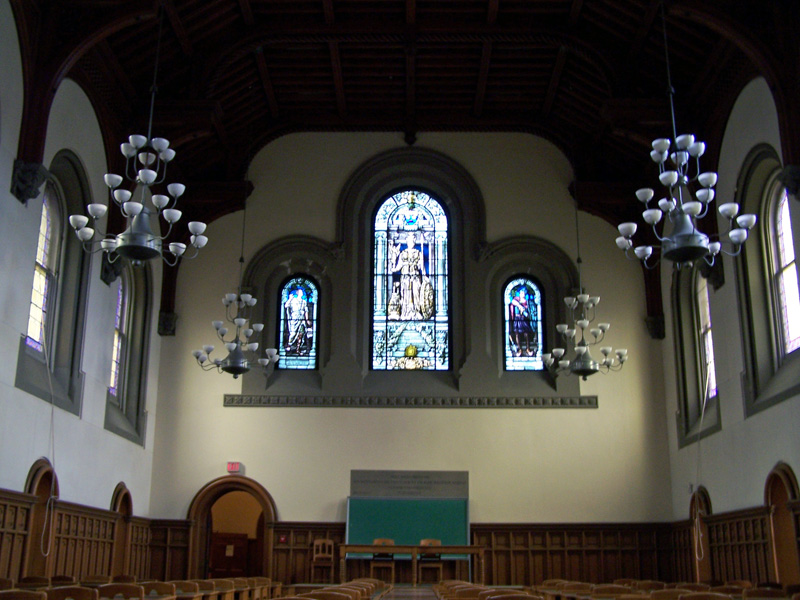
The east hall prior to the library's restoration

The board of trustees commissioned a swift restoration of the structure with insurance compensations and additional investments. Within two years, the library was replenished with donations from institutions throughout the British Empire. The new library of University College was constructed in the Laidlaw Wing of the main college building, and came to be known as the Laidlaw Library.

=== 2010s–present: Restoration ===
The east hall of University College was left empty after its reconstruction. Plans were developed to renovate much of the building, including a restoration of the library to its original location in the wing, as the Laidlaw Library was largely underused. The project was led by UC principal Donald Ainslie with support from faculty and students, including the University College Literary and Athletic Society.

The renovation took place during the early 2020s and restored several parts of the University College building. Notably, it relocated the library to its original home in the east hall. The new library retained the Romanesque Revival style architecture of the building, featuring vaulted ceilings, stained glass, and gargoyles.

== Collection ==
The UC Library collection includes works supporting UC-affiliated programs including Canadian studies, cognitive science, public health, drama, theatre and performance studies, and sexual diversity studies. It has special sections for bestsellers, graphic novels, and books about writing and academic skills. It houses the Purdy Collection, an archive of 3,000 Canadian literature books which once belonged to Canadian poet Al Purdy.
