= Donald C. Ainslie =

Canadian philosopher

16th Principal of University College, Toronto
- In office 2011 – 2019
- Preceded by: Sylvia Bashevkin
- Succeeded by: Markus Stock

Education
- Education: University of Pittsburgh (PhD); Queen's University at Kingston (BA)

Philosophical work
- Era: 21st-century philosophy
- Region: Western philosophy
- Institutions: University of Toronto
- Main interests: early modern philosophy, bioethics

Donald C. Ainslie is a Canadian philosopher and Professor of Philosophy at the University of Toronto. He is known for his works on early modern philosophy and bioethics.

Ainslie served as the 16th principal of University College, Toronto between 2011 and 2019. He is a winner of the Journal of the History of Philosophy prize in 2016 for his book Hume’s True Scepticism.

== Books ==
- Hume's True Scepticism, Oxford University Press, 2015
- The Cambridge Companion to Hume's Treatise, co-edited with Annemarie Butler, Cambridge University Press, 2015
