= List of The Hague Academy of International Law people =

List of people affiliated with The Hague Academy of International Law, including notable alumni, faculty, administration, and other people involved in the Academy’s establishment. To be included in this list, persons should have either a Wikipedia article or an independent source verifying their affiliation with the Academy.

== Alumni ==
- Eyimofe Atake (Nigeria) Senior Advocate of Nigeria (1999-Present)
- Mohamed Bennouna: (Morocco), Judge, International Court of Justice (2006–2024)
- Ben Bot: (Netherlands), Foreign Minister of the Netherlands (2003–2007)
- Fernando María Castiella y Maíz: (Spain), Foreign Minister of Spain (1957–1969)
- John Bertrand Conlan: (United States), United States Congressman from Arizona (1973–1977)
- Marcus Daly: (United States), Member, Monmouth County, New Jersey Board of Chosen Freeholders (1963–1968)
- William Deane: (Australia), Governor-General of Australia, (1996–2001)
- Curtis Doebbler: (United States), International Human Rights Attorney (1988-Present)
- Elbridge Durbrow: (United States), U.S. Ambassador to South Vietnam (1957–1961)
- Ferdinand Ďurčanský: (Slovakia), Slovak Minister for Home and Foreign Affairs (1944)
- Mónica Feria Tinta: (Peru), International Law Attorney
- Francesco Paolo Fulci: (Italy): Italian Ambassador to the United Nations (1993–1999)
- Jack Goldsmith: (United States), U.S. Assistant Attorney General for the Office of Legal Counsel (2003–2004)
- Frank Joseph Guarini: (United States), United States Congressman from New Jersey, (1979–1993)
- Johannes Kaiv: (Estonia), Estonian Consul General to the United States (1939-1965)
- Ted Kennedy: (United States), U.S. Senator from Massachusetts (1962–2009)
- Assad Kotaite: (Lebanon), President of the Council of the International Civil Aviation Organization (1976–2006)
- Howard S. Levie: (United States), Professor of Law, Saint Louis University (1963-1977)
- Thomas Mayr-Harting: (Austria), Austrian Ambassador to the United Nations (2008–2011)
- Patricia McGovern: (United States), Massachusetts State Senator (1981–1993)
- A. H. M. Moniruzzaman: (Bangladesh), Bangladeshi Ambassador to the European Union (2006–2008)
- Georg Konrad Morgen: (Germany), Nazi SS Judge (1933)
- Kamel Morjane: (Tunisia), Defense and Foreign Affairs Minister of Tunisia (2005–2011)
- Daniel Nsereko: (Uganda), Judge, International Criminal Court (2008–2012)
- Robert Poydasheff: (United States), Mayor of Columbus, Georgia (2003–2007)
- Irma S. Raker: (United States) Judge, Maryland Court of Appeals (1994–2008)
- José Ramos-Horta: (East Timor), 1996 Nobel Peace Prize Winner and President of East Timor (2008–2012)
- Francisco Rezek: (Brazil), Judge, International Court of Justice (1996–2006)
- Nasim Hasan Shah: (Pakistan), Chief Justice of the Supreme Court of Pakistan (1993–1994)
- Emory M. Sneeden: (United States), Judge, United States Court of Appeals for the Fourth Circuit (1984–1986)
- Peter Tomka: (Slovakia), Judge, International Court of Justice (2003–Present)
- John V. Tunney: (United States), United States Senator from California (1971–1977)
- Joseph Warioba: (Tanzania), Prime Minister of Tanzania (1985–1990)
- Faith Whittlesey: (United States), U.S. Ambassador to Switzerland (1981–1983, 1985–1988)

== Faculty and administration ==
This list includes both current or former permanent and visiting faculty members (professors and lecturers).

- Roberto Ago: (Italy), Judge, International Court of Justice (1979–1995)
- Boutros Boutros-Ghali: (Egypt), Secretary-General of the United Nations (1992–1996)
- Frede Castberg: (Norway), President of the Hague Academy of International Law Curatorium (1962–1976)
- Francisco Cavalcanti Pontes de Miranda: (Brazil), Judge, Brazilian Court of Appeals (1924-1939)
- James Crawford: (Australia), Judge, International Court of Justice (2015-2021)
- Giorgio Gaja: (Italy), Judge, International Court of Justice (2012-2021)
- Xue Hanqin: (China), Judge, International Court of Justice (2010–Present)
- Erik Jayme: (Germany}, Vice President, Hague Academy of International Law (2004-2024)
- Shi Jiuyong: (China), Judge, International Court of Justice (1994–2010)
- Harold Hongju Koh: (United States), Legal Adviser of the U.S. Department of State (2009-2013)
- Pieter Kooijmans: (Netherlands), Judge, International Court of Justice (1997–2006)
- Lazare Kopelmanas: (France), United Nations official (1949–1977)
- Herbert Kraus: (Germany), Professor of International Law, University of Göttingen (1928–1937,1945–1953)
- Elihu Lauterpacht: (United Kingdom), Professor of Law, University of Cambridge
- Jamshid Momtaz: (Iran), Professor, University of Tehran (1974-Present)
- Richard M. Mosk: (United States), Judge, Second District Court of Appeals, State of California (2001–2016)
- Hisashi Owada: (Japan), Judge, International Court of Justice (2003–2018)
- Gonzalo Parra-Aranguren: (Venezuela), Judge, International Court of Justice (1996–2009)
- Raymond Ranjeva: (Madagascar), Judge, International Court of Justice (1991–2009)
- Robert Redslob: (France), Hague Academy of International Law professor who developed the concept of heimat with relation to international law in 1931
- Francisco Rezek: see listing under Alumni section
- Shabtai Rosenne: (Israel), Israeli Ambassador to the United Nations (1971-1974)
- Georges Scelle: France), Secretary-General, Hague Academy of International Law (1935–1958)
- Stephen M. Schwebel: (United States), Judge, International Court of Justice (1981-2000)
- Bruno Simma: (Germany), Judge, International Court of Justice (2003–2012)
- Symeon C. Symeonides: (United States), Dean of the Willamette University Law School (1999–2011)
- Wang Tieya: (China), Judge, International Criminal Tribunal for the Former Yugoslavia (1997–2001)
- Antonio Augusto Cancado Trindade: (Brazil), Judge, International Court of Justice (2009–2022)
- Eelco van Kleffens: (Netherlands), President of the United Nations General Assembly (1954–1955)
- George Grafton Wilson: (United States), Distinguished Professor of International Law at Brown University, Harvard University, the Fletcher School of Law and Diplomacy, and the Naval War College (1900-1937)

== Other ==
- Tobias Asser: (Netherlands), Advocated for the creation of the Academy prior to his death in 1913, 1911 Nobel Peace Prize winner
- Elihu Root: (United States), As President of the Carnegie Endowment for International Peace, he helped create the Academy in 1923.
