= Curtis Doebbler =

International human rights lawyer

Curtis F.J. Doebbler is an international human rights lawyer who since 1988 has been representing individuals before international human rights bodies in Africa, Europe, the Americas and before United Nations bodies. He is also an American lawyer authorized to practice before the courts of the District of Columbia, the State of Texas and several federal courts in the United States, including the Supreme Court of the United States.

Doebbler was born in 1961 in Buffalo, New York, and has American, Palestinian, and Dutch nationality.

He is known for his outspoken opposition to human rights violations by the U.S. government and his support of individuals in countries that have been subject to armed attacks by the United States. He has worked almost two decades in Africa, Asia, and the Middle East teaching international human rights law and representing individuals in human rights cases.

In the case of the former Iraqi leader Saddam Hussein, Doebbler argued before the Iraqi Special Tribunal that the court was illegal and did not respect human rights.

He has made representations before the UN Human Rights Council and at numerous side-events of the Council calling for an impartial, fair and equal application of international human rights law and an end the selective punishment of human rights violators, especially by taking steps to end the impunity of powerful countries.

He has advised governments, including the Palestinian National Authority and the Hamas government.

He is currently research professor of law at the University of Makeni, Department of Law in Sierra Leone and a visiting professor at Webster University in Geneva.

== Education ==
Doebbler has degrees from four universities. His university degrees include a PhD in international law from London School of Economics, London, UK (he was supervised by Judge Rosalyn Higgins); a Degree of Master of Laws (LL.M./meesterstitel) from Radboud University Nijmegen (previously known as Katholieke Universiteit Nijmegen or Nijmegen Universiteit), Nijmegen, NL; a J.D. from New York Law School, New York City, New York, USA (where he studied under Myres S. McDougal and Chen Lung-chu); and Bachelor of Arts in English literature and of Fine Arts in Journalism from Southern Methodist University, Dallas, Texas, USA. He also holds a diploma from The Hague Academy of International Law awarded in 2000.

== Awards ==
For his legal and humanitarian work Doebbler has received several fellowships and awards, including a Certificate of Recognition, Academy of Graduate Studies, Tripoli, Libya. Award For Work for International Justice (2008); Award for Work for Justice and Human Rights, awarded by An-Najah National University, Nablus, Palestine (2007); Marquis Who’s Who in American Law 2005–2014; Who’s Who in the World 2006-2010 and Who’s Who in America 2006–2010; a Law Department Teaching Fellowship, LSE, London, UK (1995-1997); Morris Scholarship, London, UK (1995-1997); a Research Fellowship from the Hague Academy of International Law, The Hague, NL (July 1988); and First Prize at the Helsinki Summer Session of International and European Law, University of Helsinki, Helsinki, Finland (August 1988).

== Career ==
Doebbler has taught law at London School of Economics, Khartoum University, Pristina University, University of Tuzla, The American University in Cairo, Webster University Geneva, and Tashkent State Institute of Law. From 2004 to 2010 Doebbler was a professor of law at An-Najah National University. In March 2010, he was denied entry to Palestine by the Israeli authorities and has not been able to return to An-Najah National University. He is currently Research Professor Law at the University of Makeni in Sierra Leone where he teaches international law, human rights law, criminal law, and jurisprudence. He is also a visiting professor of law in the Department of International Relations at Webster University in Geneva, Switzerland.

As a practicing international lawyer, his clients have included governments, sitting and former heads of States, an estimated 2.5 million internally displaced persons in Sudan, an estimated 15,000 Ethiopian refugees, members of parliaments, and numerous other individuals and groups. He has also provided advice to senior government officials and non-governmental organizations.

== Writing ==
Doebbler has published numerous articles in academic journals and newspapers. His latest book is the Dictionary of Public International Law from 2018. His ten books include "The Principle of Non-Discrimination under International Law" (2007), "International Human Rights Law: Cases and Materials" (2004); "ИЗУЧЕНИЕ МЕЖДУНАРОДНЫХ ПРАВ ЧЕЛОВЕКА" (2004); "An Introduction to International Humanitarian Law" (2006); "An Introduction to International Human Rights Law" (2006); and "International Criminal Law" (2007). In the past, Doebbler has also been a regular contributor to the Egyptian newspaper Al-Ahram and to the online legal forum JURIST.

== Views on Ukraine ==
In March 2014 Doebbler wrote a wide-referenced article arguing that the United States and it allies were violating international law by trying to stymie the Crimean peoples' right to self-determination, while Russia was upholding international law by ensuring respect for his right.

== Views on the United States' killing Osama Bin Laden ==
Doebbler believes that the United States' killing of Osama bin Laden was a violation of international law. He writes that "any US claims of justification in a situation involving the taking of life requires that the US prove that it acted out of necessity or some other legal justification. Not only has the US failed to provide such proof, it has destroyed the best evidence —the body of the very victim. The US actions concerning Osama Bin Laden’s body look merely like the work of criminals trying to dispose of the evidence of their crime."
