= T.M.C. Asser Instituut =

Dutch legal research institute

- Founder: Eight Dutch universities
- Established: 1965; 61 years ago
- Mission: To further the development of international and European law in such a way that it serves the cultivation of trust and respect in the global, regional, national and local societies in which it operates.
- Focus: International and European law
- President: Prof. Dr. Ernst Hirsch Ballin
- Head: Prof. Dr. Janne Nijman
- Staff: 38 (10/10/2018)
- Key people: Prof. Dr. Ernst Hirsch Ballin; Prof. Dr. Janne Nijman; Gert Grift MSc
- Address: R.J. Schimmelpennincklaan 20-22
- Location: The Hague, Netherlands
- Website: http://www.asser.nl

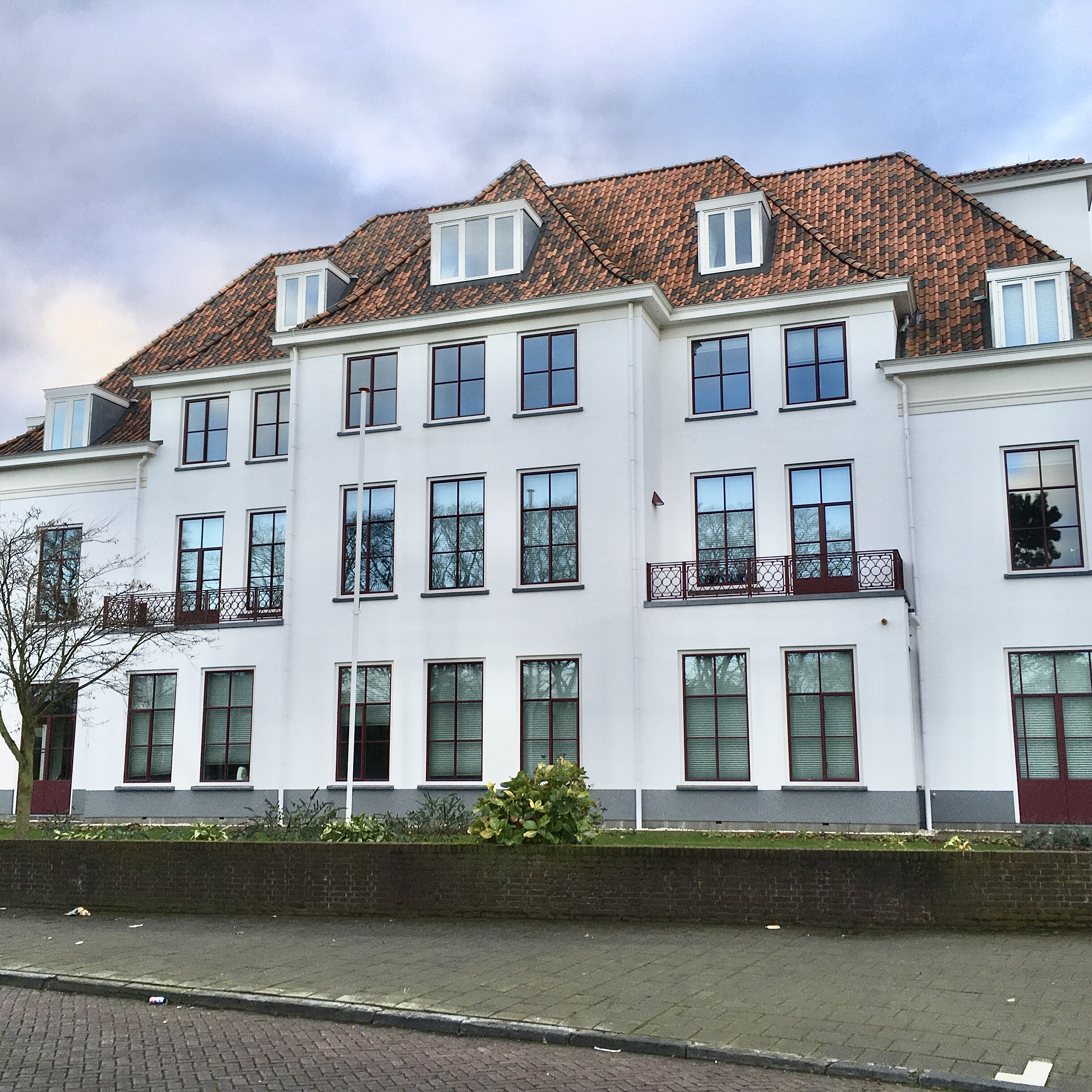
Building of the Asser Institute in The Hague (December, 2019)

The T.M.C. Asser Instituut (or Asser Institute) is a professional inter-university centre of knowledge and research. The institute carries out research in private and public international law, European law, as well as all other related fields, including international commercial arbitration, international sports law and international humanitarian and criminal law. It was established in 1965 in The Hague and it is affiliated with the University of Amsterdam. Since September 2021 the institute also hosts the Special Chair Arms Control Law.

The institute is named after Tobias Michael Carel Asser (1838–1913), who was a Dutch jurist, and co-winner (with Alfred Fried) of the Nobel Peace Prize in 1911 for his role in the formation of the Permanent Court of Arbitration at the first Hague peace conference (1899). He also advocated for the creation of an international academy of law, which led to founding of the Revue de Droit International et de Législation Comparée with John Westlake and Gustave Rolin-Jaequemyns, the Institut de Droit International and the creation of the Hague Academy of International Law.

== Fundamental research ==
The T.M.C. Asser Instituut aims towards fundamental and independent policy-oriented research. Its current (2022-2026) research agenda is ‘Rethinking public interests in international and European Law: Pairing critical reflection with perspectives for action.' Research is conducted within four research strands:

- In the public interest: accountability of the state and the prosecution of crimes
- Regulation in the public interest: Disruptive technologies in peace and security
- Public interest(s) inside/within international and European institutions and their practices
- Transnational public interests: constituting public interest beyond and below the state

Besides the research facilities for its team of expert researchers, the institute has access to an extensive international network of academic and scientific contacts. The T.M.C. Asser Instituut aims to develop young talent. The Asser PhD Programme offers promising young lawyers the opportunity to work on their research. The funding and appointment of new candidates is done in collaboration with other institutions, preferably law faculties.

== Contract-research and legal advice ==
The institute carries out contract research and consultancy work. This ranges from tailored consultancy finding (ad hoc) solutions for small legal issues to coordination and/or export of long-term structural (research) projects. Clients include among others the European Union, national governments, ministries, international organizations, and law firms.

== Conferences and events ==
T.M.C. Asser Instituut organizes regular lectures, seminars, and conferences. They serve as a platform for high-level discussions and interactions with the institute's multitude of partners, academics and practitioners, policy-makers, and the wider legal community of The Hague and beyond.

== Annual T.M.C. Asser Lecture ==
On the occasion of its 50th anniversary in 2015, the T.M.C Asser Instituut launched the Annual T.M.C. Asser Lecture on the development of international law. Each year the institute invites an internationally renowned jurist and outstanding public intellectual to take inspiration from Tobias Asser’s vision and to examine how to respond to ‘the condition of society’. It aspires to be a platform for constructive, critical reflection on the role of law in addressing the challenges and (potentially radical) changes of the global society of the 21st century.

Speakers at the Annual Lecture have included Brigid Laffan (2022), Andrew Murray (2020), Anne Orford (2019), Martti Koskenniemi (2018), Saskia Sassen (2017), Onora O'Neill (2016), and Joseph Weiler (2015).

== Publisher ==
The institute has its own publisher: T.M.C. Asser Press. The following yearbooks are published: the Netherlands Yearbook of International Law, the Yearbook of International Humanitarian Law, the Yearbook of International Sports Arbitration, and the NL ARMS Netherlands Annual Review of Military Studies.

T.M.C. Asser Press also publishes scholarly and peer-reviewed journals, including the Netherlands International Law Review, the Hague Journal on the Rule of Law, the European Business Organization Law Review, The International Sports Law Journal, and the Nederlands Internationaal Privaatrecht.

T.M.C. Asser Press published in cooperation with Springer-Verlag.

== Hague Academic Coalition ==
The T.M.C. Asser Instituut is a member of the Hague Academic Coalition (HAC).

The member institutions are:

- Carnegie Foundation
- Hague Institute for the Internationalisation of Law (HiiL)
- International Institute of Social Studies of Erasmus University Rotterdam (ISS)
- Leiden University - Campus The Hague / Grotius Centre
- Netherlands Institute of International Relations 'Clingendael'
- The Hague Academy of International Law
- The Hague University of Applied Sciences (Haagse Hogeschool)
- T.M.C. Asser Instituut

== Hague Initiative for Law and Armed Conflict ==
The HILAC Law and Armed Conflict Lecture Series is an occasional evening lecture series on the subject of law and armed conflict. It is hosted by the Hague Initiative for Law and Armed Conflict (HILAC), consisting of the T.M.C. Asser Instituut, the Netherlands Red Cross and the Amsterdam Center for International Law and held at the T.M.C. Asser Instituut.

== Sports Law ==
The Asser Institute is one of the few research institutes specialized in sports law. Researchers Antoine Duval and Ben Von Rompuy from the International Sports Law Centre lodged a complaint against the International Skating Union to the European Commission on behalf of speed skaters Mark Tuitert and Niels Kerstholt in 2014. The European Court of Justice ruled in favor of the speed skaters in their judgement on 21 December 2023. The judgement was delivered simultaneously with judgements on the European Super League case and the Royal Antwerp FC case, changing the landscape of sports governance.

The institute also organises the Annual ISLJ Sports Law Conference.
