= Jane Aeberhard-Hodges =

Lawyer and gender equality consultant

- Education: Australian National University (BA, LLB); University of Sydney (LLM)

Jane Aeberhard-Hodges is a lawyer, gender equality consultant and former Director of the International Labour Organization's Gender Equality Bureau. She now serves as an advisor to the Every Woman Coalition. She specializes in public international law, comparative labour law and human rights law.

== Education ==
Aeberhard-Hodges obtained a BA (1974) and LLB (1976) from the Australian National University and completed LLM examinations (1979) at the University of Sydney. She holds various post-graduate diplomas, including a Post-Graduate Diploma on Crisis Response (2003) from the University of Wisconsin-Madison's Disaster Management Centre, a Post-Graduate Diploma in Management of Interdependence of Developing Countries in a Changing World (1991) from the Centre for Applied Studies in International Negotiations, Geneva, and a Certificate in Public International Law (1997) from The Hague Academy of International Law. She is qualified as a solicitor and notary public in New South Wales and as a trademarks attorney in Australia.

== Career ==
Aeberhard-Hodges joined the International Labour Organization in 1979 and served for over three decades at its headquarters and in the field. She also served in the Freedom of Association and Equality and Human Rights Coordination Branches, the Southern African Multidisciplinary Team, the Department for Government, Labour Law and Administration and the Department of Social Dialogue, Labour Law and Administration.

Under Aeberhard-Hodges, the ILO began work on the Violence and Harassment Convention (No. 190) adopted in 2019.

Since 2014, Aeberhard-Hodges has edited the International Labour Law Reports, and has been a Senior Research Associate with the UN Research Institute for Social Development. From 2016 to 2019, she was the Gender Equality Director of Investing in Women, an Australian Government initiative for women's economic empowerment in South East Asia, where she remains on the expert roster. She has advised the Every Woman Coalition since 2020.

== Selected works ==
- Driving gender reform in Vietnam's Labour Code, ANU's East Asia Forum Quarterly, Volume 11, No. 1, January – March 2019, pages 32–33.
- LGBTQI+ Right to Housing in the United States, case commentary for UNRISD Social Protection and Human Rights webpage, February 2019.
- Research Handbook on Labour, Business and Human Rights Law, chapter 15 on Workplace gender equality as a human right: the ILO approach, Eds J.R. Bellace, University of Pennsylvania, USA and B. ter Haar, Leiden University, the Netherlands (Edward Elgar, NY, August 2019)
- Research Handbook on Feminist Engagement with International Law, chapter 17 on labour law, Eds S. Harris-Rimmer and K. Ogg, (Edward Elgar, UK, April 2019)
- An Employment Right Standard Provision for Working Women Experiencing Domestic Violence, co-authors L. McFerran and A. Tuvera (2018) University of Oxford Human Rights Hub Journal 167 (Oxford University, August 2018)
- Labouring under false assumptions? Exploring the rifts between international standards and cultural values in Vietnam's Labour Code reform: Research paper for the ILO's Women and the Future of Work in the Asia-Pacific Conference, co-authored M. Urbano and Huong Thien (Bangkok, 31 January – 1 February 2018), ILO Bangkok.
- Access to leave from work for domestic violence in Australia, Social Protection and Human Rights Project, UNRISD website posted 20 February 2018.
- An ILO instrument on violence against women and men at work: The Australian influence, Co-author L. McFerran, Journal of Industrial Relations (Sydney, August 2017). An International Labour Organization instrument on violence against women and men at work: The Australian influence.
- An international treaty against gender-based violence at work? How Australian policies can influence the debate (9 March 2016, seminar presentation, University of Sydney Business School, Australia)
- Have recent judicial decisions across the globe improved gender justice for women workers? paper selected for presentation at the Gender, Institutions and Change Conference (University of Manchester, UK, 3 – 4 April 2017)
- Regional protection against HIV-based discrimination in the Armed Forces, International Labor Rights Case Law, Issue 2, Volume 2, pages 233 – 239 (Brill Nijhoff Publishing, Leiden, June 2016)
- International Labour Law, Ed. Barbara J. Fick, contributing chapter on labour law (Edward Elgar, NY, December 2015)
- Eliminating Sex Discrimination at Work: Recent Court Decisions since Beijing+20 (UNRISD: United Nations, Geneva, 26 May 2015)
