= HJP =

HJP may refer to:

- The Hague Justice Portal
- Hajipur Junction railway station (station code), India
- Hindustan Janata Party, a political party in India
- Hong Joon Pyo (born 1953), South Korean politician
- Piasecki HJP, a helicopter
