= Peace Palace Library =

Collection of studies in international law in The Hague, Netherlands

Coordinates: 52.0866°N 4.2955°E

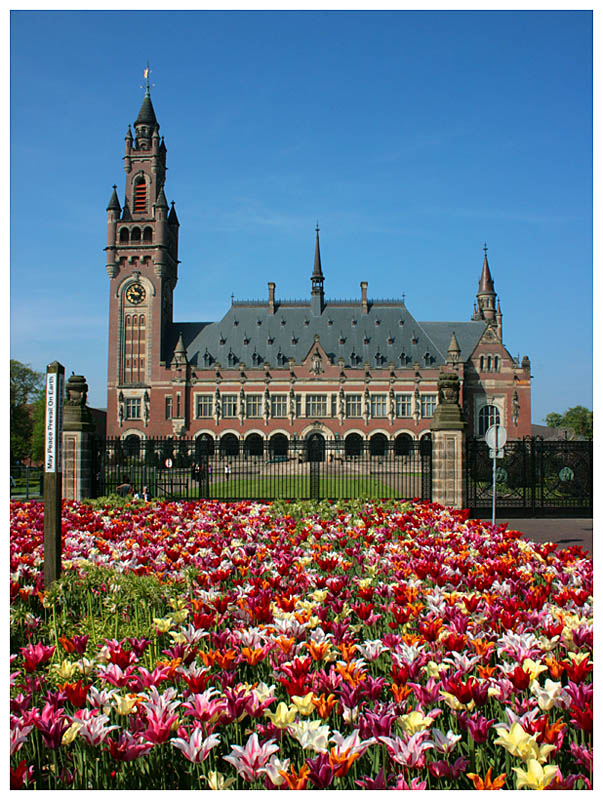
Peace Palace, The Hague, Netherlands

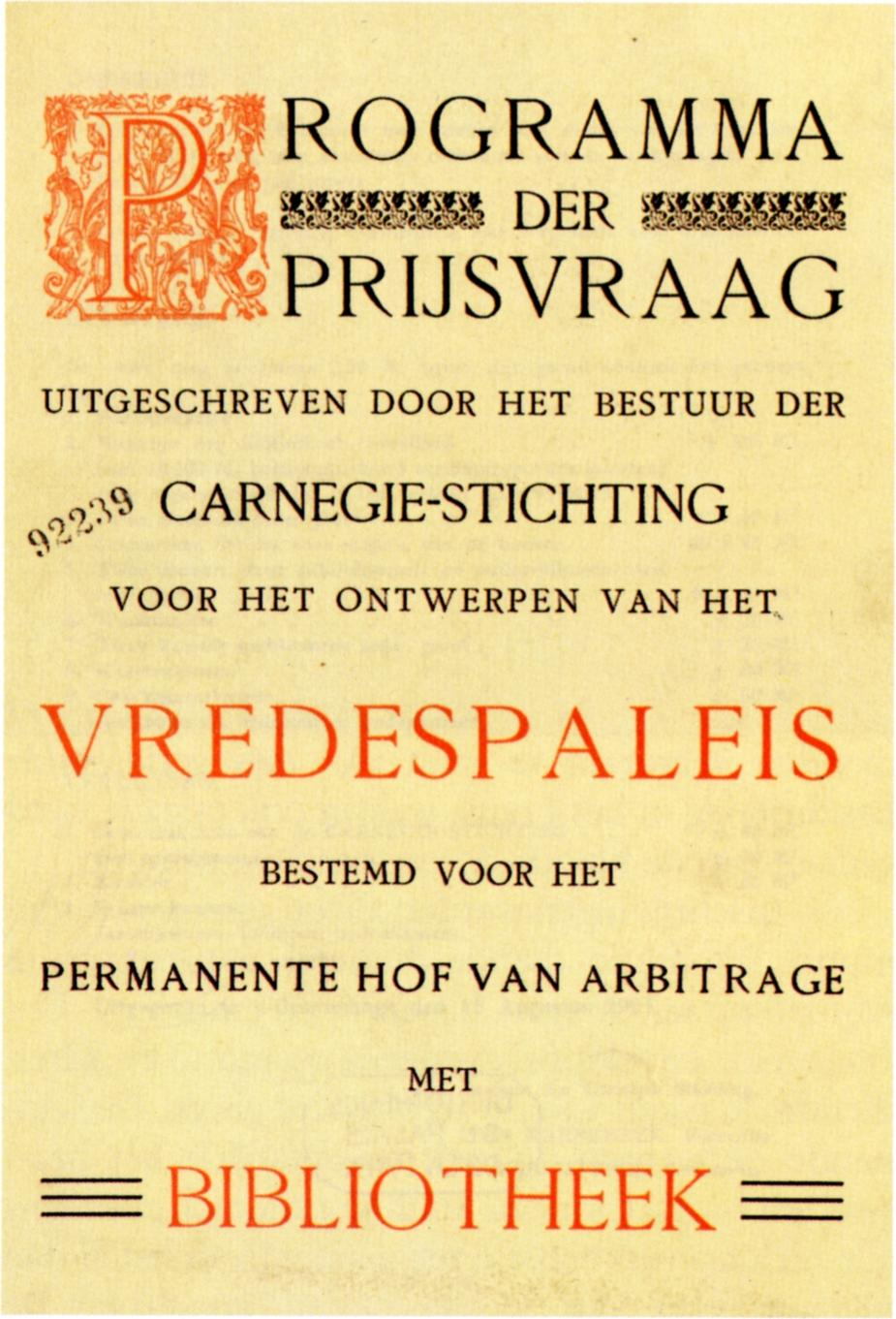
Programme for 1905 Peace Palace architectural competition

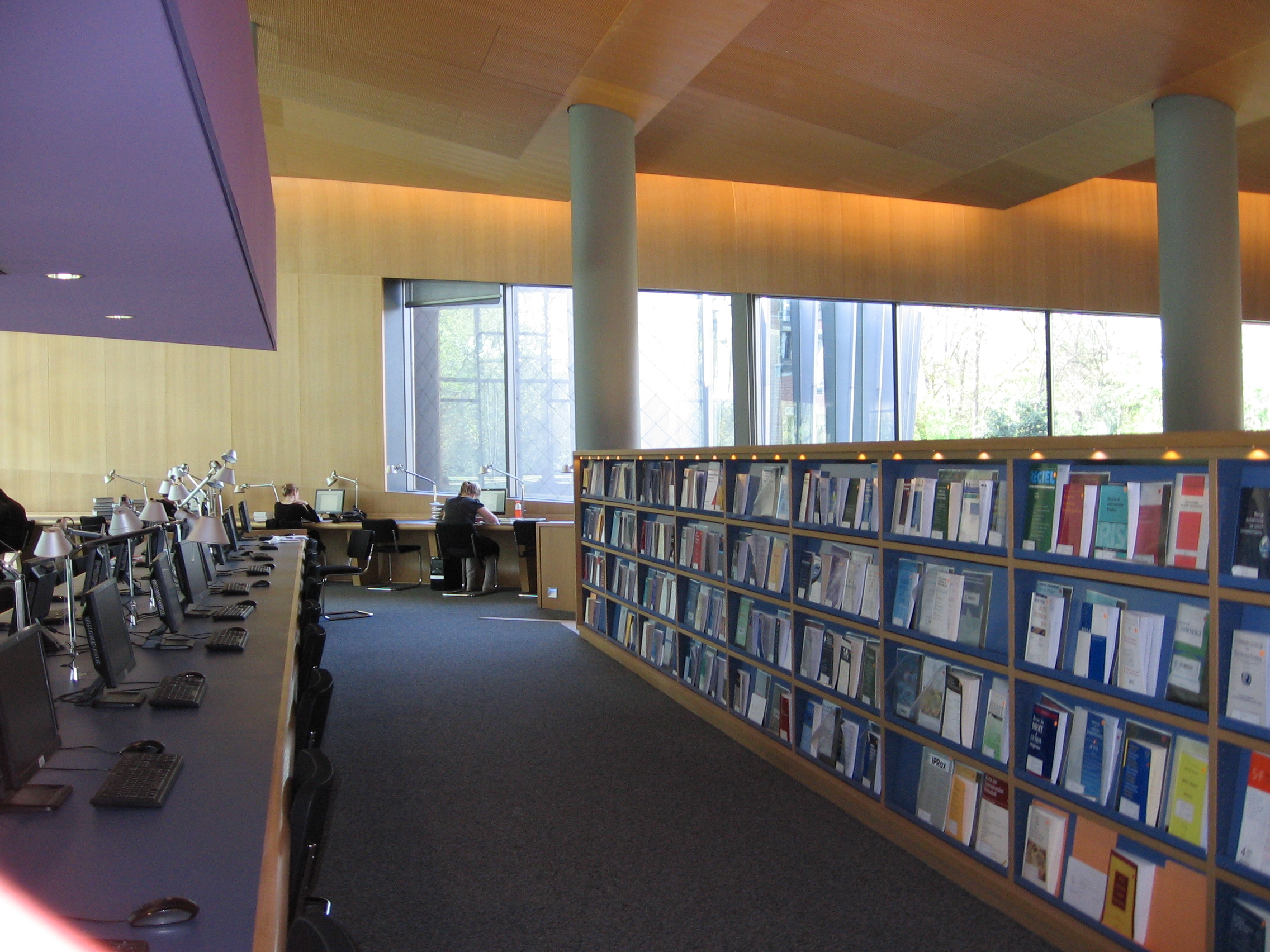
Peace Palace Library

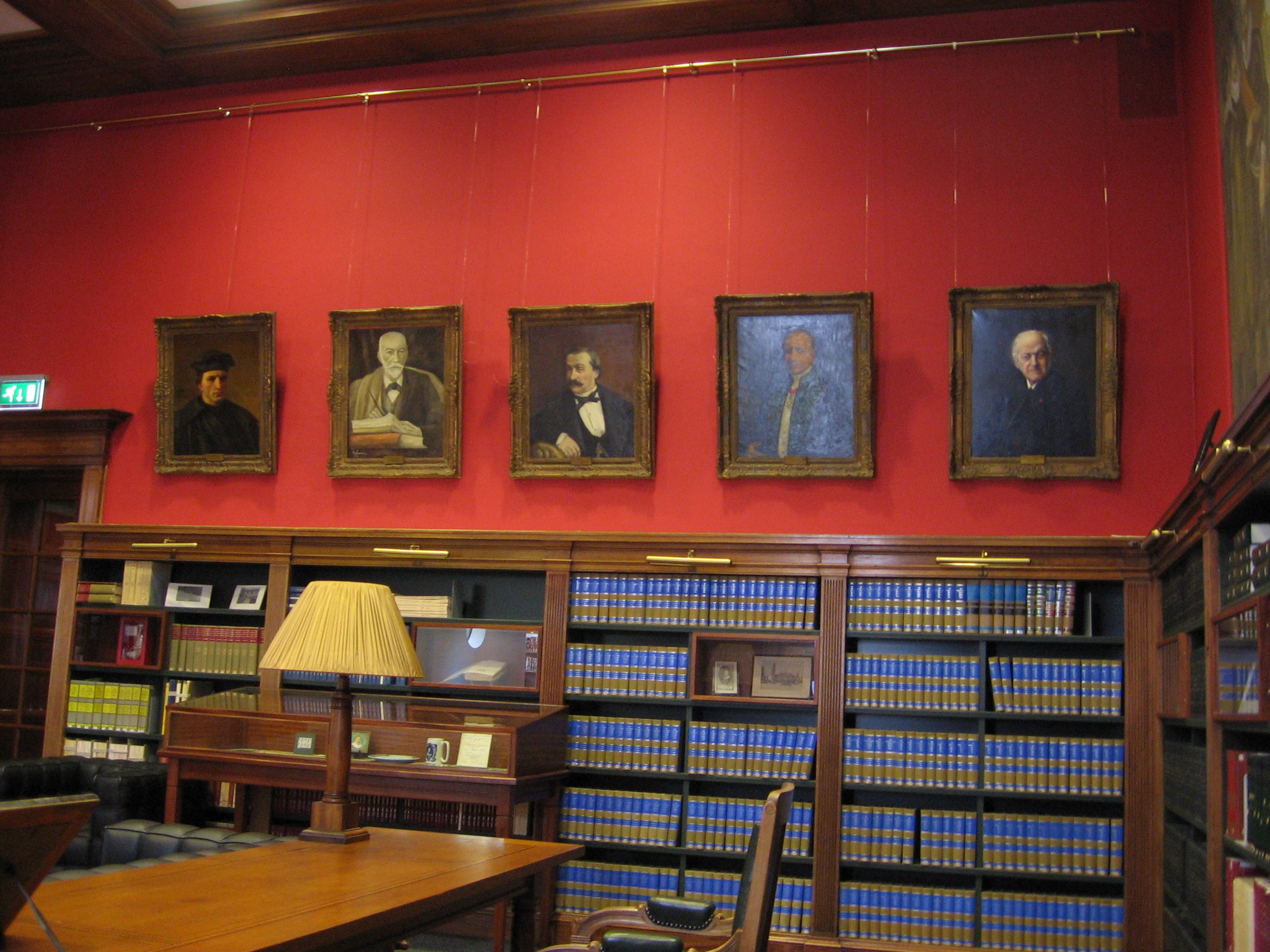
Peace Palace Library

The Peace Palace Library is a collection of studies and references specializing in international law. It is located in The Hague, Netherlands, and was established to support the Permanent Court of Justice.

== Description ==
The library is one of the oldest libraries dedicated to international law. Its main objective is to service the institutions residing in the Peace Palace, including the International Court of Justice, the Permanent Court of Arbitration, and The Hague Academy of International Law. The library is open to all scholars and students of international law. In 2022, Karin Lodder became the Manager of the Library. Jeroen Vervliet is the Head Librarian.

== History and relationship with the Carnegie Foundation ==
The Dutch Carnegie Foundation was created in 1903. It received a financial donation of $1.5 million by Andrew Carnegie, which made the construction of the Peace Palace possible. The palace was completed in 1913, just before the outbreak of the First World War.

The Carnegie Foundation is subsidized by the Dutch Ministry for Foreign Affairs. Since 1913 the foundation has remained the owner of the palace, and it still runs the Peace Palace Library. The Peace Palace is located at Carnegieplein, The Hague, Netherlands. The palace was built to accommodate the Permanent Court of Arbitration, but Carnegie insisted that room be made available also for a legal library. The Peace Palace Library resided in the palace itself until 2007, when it moved to the new Academy and Library Building in the rear of the Peace Palace.

== Collection ==
The Peace Palace Library has collected publications since 1913, and now offers over a million titles. A large part is searchable through the library's online catalogue, which also classifies book items. In its classification the library tries to remain faithful, as much as possible, to the Catalogue de la bibliothèque du Palais de la paix, designed in 1916 by Elsa Oppenheim, daughter of the international lawyer Jacques Oppenheim. The library also uses a modern classification system with around 4,500 keywords.

=== International and national law ===
Most of the publications of the library are about public international law, addressing topics such as the law of state responsibility, human rights, international humanitarian law, international criminal law, law of international organizations, and European law. The collection of the palace further includes private international law, international commercial law, international bankruptcy law, and international law of procedure. In 2012 the Peace Palace Library and the Institute for Environmental Security began compiling a research database on the proposed Law of Ecocide. The library also collects books on topics of national law, such as comparative law, domestic public and constitutional law, criminal law and criminal procedure.

=== Special collections ===
The library houses a few special collections, of which the Grotius Collection and the Peace Movement collection are the most important. The library has the world's largest collection of works by Hugo Grotius, including a rare early edition of De Iure Belli ac Pacis (On the Law of War and Peace), his most famous work written in 1625. It also holds a special collection of pacifist images, under the title ‘’Peace Movement, Images and Posters and League of Nations philately’’.

== Publications ==
The library maintains the Peace Palace Library Blog, the news service International Law News, and the Peace Palace Library Research Guides, introducing researchers to various topics of international law.

During its centenary celebrations in 2013, the Library acquired a 1499 edition of Gaius’s Institutes.

== Award ==
In 2005, the Library won the IALL award for communications.

== Literature ==
- Duynstee, Bob; Meijer, Daan; Tilanus, Floris, et al., The Building of Peace: A hundred years of work on Peace through Law. The Peace Palace 1913-2013, The Hague: Carnegie Foundation, [2013]
