= Hierarchy (disambiguation) =

A hierarchy is an arrangement of units into related levels of different weights or ranks, meaning that levels are considered "higher" or "lower" than one another. The term, which originally meant rule by priests, is now generalised and describes systems with a linear concept of subordinates and superiors and where each level has only 1 direct parent level. Hierarchies are typically depicted as a tree structures.

Hierarchy may also refer to:

- Hierarchy (mathematics), the mathematical model of a hierarchical structure as an ordered set
  - Containment hierarchy, a hierarchy of only strictly nested sets
- Hierarchy (object-oriented programming), also known as inheritance, the creation of new classes from existing classes
- Hierarchical database model, a tree-like database model
  - Hierarchical query, an SQL query on a hierarchical database
- Hierarchical linear modeling, multi-level statistical analysis and linear regression
- Hierarchical organization, the structure of most organizations, including governments, businesses and organized religions
  - Catholic Church hierarchy
- Settlement hierarchy, a way of arranging settlements into a hierarchy
- Hierarchical network, the hierarchical of computer network components
- Hierarchical control system, a layered model for component organization in software and robotics
- Dominance hierarchy, an intraspecific ordering of individuals or groups by power status and dominance
  - Social hierarchy, the concept as applied to humans
- Memory hierarchy, the hierarchical organization of computer storage for analysis of performance issues
- Hierarchy of life, the biological organisation of all life from the atomic level to the biosphere
- Hierarchy of genres, any formalization that ranks different types of art genres in an art-form in terms of their value
- Hierarchy of values, an ordered list of social values in US law
- Hierarchy of needs
- Hierarchy, an alien race in the Universe at War video game series
- Hierarchy, a 2024 South Korean TV series
- "Hierarchy", a song by Noisettes from the 2007 album What's the Time Mr Wolf?

== See also ==
- Tree structure
