= John Dugard =

South African professor

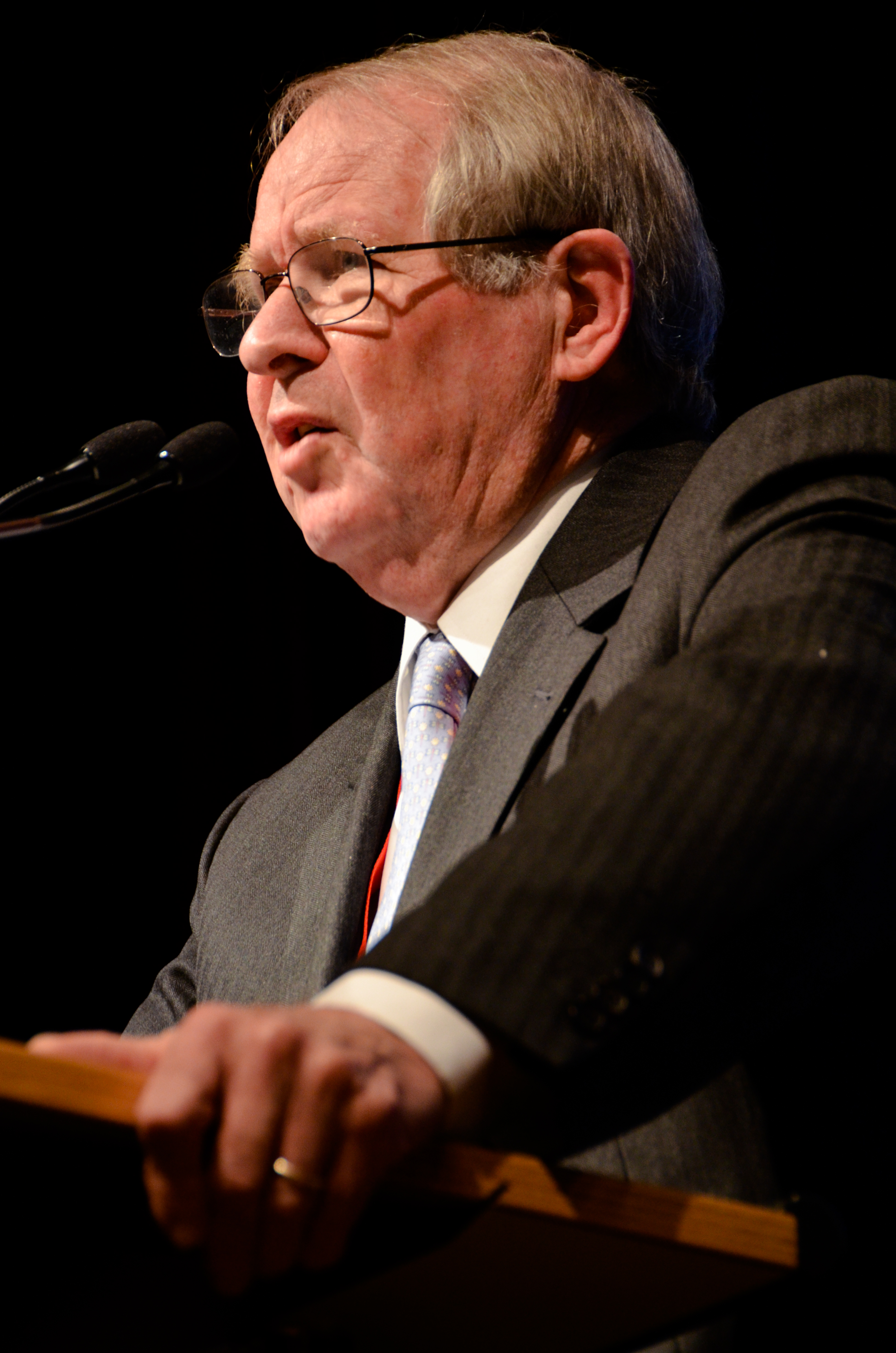
- Born: Christopher John Robert Dugard; 23 August 1936 (age 90); Fort Beaufort, Cape Province, Union of South Africa

Academic background
- Education: University of Stellenbosch (BA, LLB); University of Cambridge (LLB, LLD)

Academic work
- Discipline: Public international law
- Institutions: University of Witwatersrand; Leiden University
- Doctoral students: Janne Nijman

Christopher John Robert Dugard (born 23 August 1936) is a South African professor of international law. His main academic specializations are in Roman-Dutch law, public international law, jurisprudence, human rights, criminal procedure and international criminal law. He has served on the International Law Commission, the primary UN institution for the development of international law, and has been active in reporting on human-rights violations by Israel in the Palestinian territories.

He has written several books on human rights and international law, especially the crime of apartheid, in addition to coauthoring textbooks on criminal law and procedure and international law. He has written extensively on South African apartheid.

== Education ==
John Dugard attended Queen's College Boys' High School in Queenstown, passing Matriculation in 1953. He earned his BA (1956) and LLB (1958) degrees at Stellenbosch University, and a second LLB (1965) and LL.D. degree, a Diploma in International Law (1965), and an LL.D. Degree (1980), all from Cambridge University in England. He has a number of honorary doctorates.

== Career ==
=== Academic ===
From 1969 to 1998, Dugard was a Professor of Law at the University of Witwatersrand in Johannesburg, South Africa. From 1975 to 1977 he was the dean at the School of Law there. From 1978 to 1990, he was the director of the university's Centre for Applied Legal Studies, "a research centre committed to the promotion of Human Rights in South Africa".

Dugard was Director of the Lauterpacht Centre for International Law at the University of Cambridge from 1995 to 1997.

In 1998, Dugard was appointed Chair in Public International Law at Leiden University in the Netherlands and as Director of the Advanced LL.M. programme in Public International Law, succeeding Peter Kooijmans who had been appointed a judge of the International Court of Justice. He became professor emeritus at Leiden in 2007.

Since 2006, he has been a Professor of Law at the Centre for Human Rights of the University of Pretoria.

He has held visiting professorships at Princeton University, Duke University, UC Berkeley and University of Pennsylvania, and University of New South Wales (Australia).

=== Other professional activities ===
Dugard has, since 1997, served as a member of the International Law Commission of the United Nations. In 2000, he became its Special Rapporteur on Diplomatic Protection.

In 2000, he served as Judge ad hoc in the cases concerning Armed Activities on the Territory of the Congo (Democratic Republic of the Congo v. Burundi) (Democratic Republic of the Congo v. Uganda) and (Democratic Republic of the Congo v. Rwanda) at the International Court of Justice.

Dugard visited the Palestine Center in Washington DC in March 2009 and gave a lecture entitled "Apartheid and Occupation under International Law." The video and the transcript of the lecture were made available online.

In 2023-24, he was appointed as a member of the South African legal team in the case of South Africa v. Israel, in which Israel is accused of contravening the Genocide Convention during the ongoing Gaza war.

== United Nations ==
After the outbreak of the Palestinian Second Intifada in late 2000, John Dugard was appointed by the United Nations Commission on Human Rights (UNCHR) chairman of a commission of inquiry on the situation of human rights in the Palestinian territories. In 2001, Dugard was appointed United Nations Special Rapporteur to UNCHR. He was required to submit annual reports and recommendations to the UNCHR concerning the situation of international human rights and humanitarian law in the Palestinian territories.

In its first special session in July 2006, the United Nations Human Rights Council dispatched an urgent fact-finding mission headed by Dugard to report on the situation in the Palestinian territories. On 26 September 2006, Dugard reported that the "standards of human rights in the Palestinian territories have fallen to intolerable new levels".

Beginning in 2008, Dugard served as Judge ad hoc on the International Court of Justice.

Dugard visited the Palestine Center in Washington DC in March 2009 and gave a lecture entitled "Apartheid and Occupation under International Law."

=== 2007 and 2008 Reports ===
Dugard released a report to the General Assembly in February 2007 that stated "Israel's laws and practices certainly resemble aspects of apartheid" in the Palestinian territory. Dugard also stated, "discrimination against Palestinians occurs in many fields. Moreover, the 1973 International Convention on the Suppression and Punishment of the Crime of Apartheid appears to be violated by many practices, particularly those denying freedom of movement to Palestinians. (...) At the same time elements of the occupation constitute forms of colonialism and of apartheid, which are contrary to international law".

In the same report, Dugard said that "Jewish settlements in the West Bank are illegal. They violate article 49, paragraph 6, of the Fourth Geneva Convention and their illegality has been confirmed by the International Court of Justice in its advisory opinion on the Wall. Despite the illegality of settlements and the unanimous condemnation of settlements by the international community, the Government of Israel persists in allowing settlements to grow. Sometimes settlement expansion occurs openly and with the full approval of the Government (...) Sometimes settlements expand unlawfully in terms of Israeli law, but no attempt is made to enforce the law (...) Undoubtedly the most aggravated settler behaviour occurs in Hebron, where Palestinian schoolchildren are assaulted and humiliated on their way to schools, shopkeepers are beaten and residents live in fear of settler terror. Despite rulings of the High Court of Justice that it is the duty of the IDF to protect Palestinian farmers from settlers, there is still evidence that the IDF turns a blind eye to settler violence and, on occasion, collaborates with the settlers in harassing and humiliating Palestinians. Indeed I have witnessed such conduct on the part of the IDF myself in Hebron", that "it is difficult to resist the conclusion that many of Israel's laws and practices violate the 1966 Convention on the Elimination of All Forms of Racial Discrimination. Israelis are entitled to enter the closed zone between the Wall and the Green Line without permits while Palestinians require permits to enter the closed zone; house demolitions in the West Bank and East Jerusalem are carried out in a manner that discriminates against Palestinians; throughout the West Bank, and particularly in Hebron, settlers are given preferential treatment over Palestinians in respect of movement (major roads are reserved exclusively for settlers), building rights and army protection; and the laws governing family reunification (para. 48 above) unashamedly discriminate against Palestinians. It is less certain that the International Convention on the Suppression and Punishment of the Crime of Apartheid is violated" and that "the international community, speaking through the United Nations, has identified three regimes as inimical to human rights - colonialism, apartheid and foreign occupation. Numerous resolutions of the General Assembly of the United Nations testify to this. Israel's occupation of the West Bank, Gaza and East Jerusalem contains elements of all three of these regimes".

Referring to Israel's actions in the West Bank, he wrote, "Can it seriously be denied that the purpose [...] is to establish and maintain domination by one racial group (Jews) over another racial group (Palestinians) and systematically oppressing them? Israel denies that this is its intention or purpose. But such an intention or purpose may be inferred from the actions described in this report."

Critics noted that Dugard was appointed in 2001 as an unpaid expert by UNCHR to investigate only violations by the Israeli side. Israel and the U.S. therefore dismissed his reports as one-sided. Israel's UN ambassador in Geneva, Itzhak Levanon, said that "Professor Dugard will better serve the cause of peace by ceasing to enflame the hatred between Israelis and Palestinians, who have embarked on serious talks to solve this contentious situation." An Israeli foreign ministry spokesman, Mark Regev, said it was "rank politicisation" of the UN's human rights apparatus. "This is the promoting of partisan, one-sided political attitudes which frankly don't serve the interests of anyone who is seriously interested in human rights."

Dugard also issued a report to the General Assembly in 2008. In this report he responded to criticism of him by pointing out that "the mandate of the Special Rapporteur therefore requires him to report on human rights violations committed by the occupying Power and not by the occupied people". Also wrote that "Gaza remains occupied territory" and that "the collective punishment of Gaza by Israel is expressly prohibited by international humanitarian law and has resulted in a serious humanitarian crisis".

In 2009, Dugard was replaced as Special Rapporteur by United States professor of international relations Richard A. Falk.

=== Other writings on Israel and the Palestinian territories ===
In an August 2009 article for the Huffington Post, Dugard compared the current situation in the occupied Palestinian territory to South African apartheid. "Israel is long overdue", he wrote, "to undergo the same racial reckoning and transformation that the United States underwent in the 1960s and South Africa passed through in the 1990s". He stated that Israeli settlers had two choices: to "leave the occupied territories" or "live under Palestinian law". And he declared that "Israel must make the choice in the weeks ahead whether it intends to continue ruling over the Palestinians indefinitely or will step back from the dual system of law and apartheid it appears poised to embrace under the leadership of Prime Minister Netanyahu."

Dugard also compared Israeli policy in the occupied Palestinian territory to apartheid in South Africa in a November 2011 article for Al Jazeera.

While acknowledging some distinctions between the two systems, he said that "in practice, there is little difference", with both regimes being "characterized by discrimination, repression and territorial fragmentation (that is, land seizures)." He said that Israel's "confiscation of Palestinian farms under the pretext of building a security wall" was reminiscent of South African actions against blacks, and argued that "Israel has gone beyond apartheid South Africa in constructing separate (and unequal) roads for Palestinians and settlers". He also claimed that Israeli security forces, like the South African Security Police, "practiced torture on a large scale".

In a 2012 paper, Dugard reiterated his comparison of Israel and South Africa. "Israel does not recognize those who engage in resistance activities, either as combatants or as protesters, as 'political' prisoners as this would confer legitimacy on the cause that motivates them", wrote Dugard. "Instead they are termed ordinary criminals, security prisoners or, most frequently, 'terrorists.' South Africa too sought to denigrate its political prisoners in this way". He further maintained that "more Palestinians have been killed in targeted assassinations of combatants [by Israel] than were judicially executed in South Africa". He concluded that "However cruel and inhuman the conditions of Palestinian prisoners, however unfair the trials that sent them to prison, and however demeaning their characterization as 'criminals' or 'terrorists,' we should not forget that Palestinian prisoners are the fortunate ones. For they were not murdered by a regime that murders political opponents under the euphemism of 'targeted assassinations.'"

In a September 2012 article, he declared that Britain, as the original "Mandatory Power" governing what is now Israel under a League of Nations mandate, had violated a "sacred" obligation to Palestinians by supporting Israel over the decades and that the "jury is still out on the question whether Israel acted in self-defence or as an aggressor" in the Six-Day War. "Sadly Britain has done little to protect the human rights of the Palestinian people or to advance their independence", Dugard wrote. While questioning the legality of the 1947 UN resolution establishing Israel, he argued for the legitimacy of Palestine as a state, noting that it is a member of the League of Arab States and of UNESCO and that "between 120 and 130 states have recognised the state of Palestine in some way or another".

Dugard was one of 52 international figures who signed a 2012 letter calling for a military embargo against Israel on the eve of the International Day of Solidarity with the People of Palestine. Among the other signatories were Nobel Peace laureates Mairead Maguire and Adolfo Pérez Esquivel, performer Roger Waters, filmmakers Mike Leigh and Ken Loach, and authors Alice Walker and Naomi Klein. Citing "Israel's unchecked belligerence" and "subjugation of Palestinians", the letter argued that "Israel's attempt to justify [the] illegal use of belligerent and disproportionate military force as 'self-defence' does not stand up to legal - or moral - scrutiny, as states cannot invoke self-defence for acts that serve to defend an unlawful situation which they have created in the first place".

== Criticism of Dugard ==
The Anti-Defamation League (ADL) and UN Watch, acknowledged pro-Israel organizations, have criticised Dugard for what they call his biased commentary on the situation in Palestine.

== Memberships ==
He is a member of the Institut de Droit International. Since 1997, he has been a member of the UN International Law Commission. He is a member of the Crimes Against Humanity Initiative Advisory Council, a project of the Whitney R. Harris World Law Institute at Washington University School of Law in St. Louis to establish the world's first treaty on the prevention and punishment of crimes against humanity.

== Honors and awards ==
John Dugard has honorary doctorates of law from the University of Cape Town, University of Natal, University of Port Elizabeth, University of Pretoria, University of Stellenbosch and the University of the Witwatersrand.

In April 2012, he received one of South Africa's highest civilian honours, the Order of the Baobab: Gold, in a ceremony conducted by the then President Jacob Zuma. In 2026, he won the Olof Palme Prize, together with Navi Pillay.

== Selected bibliography ==
=== Books ===
- International Law: A South African Perspective 3rd Edition (2006) ISBN 0-7021-7121-2
- The Last Years of Apartheid: Civil Liberties in South Africa, with Nicholas Haysom, Gilbert Marcus (1992) ISBN 0-87124-145-5
- Recognition and the United Nations (1987) ISBN 0-521-46322-X
- Human Rights and the South African Legal Order (1978) ISBN 0-691-09236-2
- The South West Africa/Namibia Dispute (1973) ISBN 0-520-01886-9
- Introduction to criminal procedure Juta and Co Ltd (1977)
- Recognition and the United Nations Grotius Publications (1987)

=== Articles in scholarly journals ===
- "Objections to the revision of the 1962 judgment of the International Court of Justice in the South West Africa cases" (1965) 82, South African Law Journal, 178-191
- "The legal effect of United Nations Resolutions on Apartheid" (1966) 83, South African Law Journal, 44–59.
- "South West Africa cases, second phase, 1966" (1966) 83, South African Law Journal, 429-460
- "The Organization of African Unity and Colonialism: An enquiry into the plea of self-defence as a justification for the use of force in the eradication of colonialism" (1967) 16, International and Comparative Law Quarterly, 157-190
- "The revocation of the mandate for South West Africa" (1968) 62, American Journal of International Law, 78-97
- "The Simonstown Agreement : South Africa, Britain and the United Nations" (1968) 85, South African Law Journal, 142-156
- "South West Africa and the supremacy of the South African parliament" (1969) 86, South African Law Journal, 194-201
- "The judicial process, positivism and civil liberty" (1971) 88, South African Law Journal 181-200
- "Academic freedom in South Africa" (1970) 3, Droits de l'homme 186-194
- "The political trial: Some special considerations" (1974) 95, South African Law Journal 59-72
- "Statutory interpretation as an exercise in choice" (1978) 95, South African Law Journal pp 451–454
- "Some realism about the judicial process and positivism" (1981) 98, South African Law Journal 372-387
- "Chief Justice versus President: Does the ghost of Brown v Leyds NO still haunt our judges?" (1981) 165, De Rebus 421-422
- "Judges and unjust laws" (1981) 22/2, Codicillus 50-55
- "The judiciary and national security" (1982) 99, South African Law Journal 655-659
- "A triumph for executive power – an examination of the Rabie report and the Internal Security Act 74, of 1982" (1982) 99 South African Law Journal 589-604
- "Using the law to pervert justice" (1983) 11/2, Human Rights (American Bar Association) 22–25, 50–54.
- "Towards Genuine democracy in conflict ridden countries: A South African perspective" (1991) 1, Beyond Law (Mas Alla del Derecho Colombia) 65–76.
- "Human rights, apartheid and lawyers. Are there any lessons for lawyers from common law countries?" (1992) 15, University of New South Wales Law Journal 439–447.
- "Towards racial justice in South Africa" in Henkin and Rosenthal (eds) Constitutionalism and rights. The influence of the US Constitution abroad (1990)

=== Legal Briefings ===
- South West Africa and the International Court;: Two viewpoints on the 1971 advisory opinion (1973) ISBN B0006CGXB2
- Apartheid and human rights in South Africa: Techniques of implementation (1974) ISBN B0006WUI1I
- The denationalization of Black South Africans in pursuance of apartheid: A question for the International Court of Justice? (1984) ISBN 0-85494-832-5

=== UN reports ===
- Report of the Human Rights Inquiry Commission established pursuant to UN Commission on Human Rights resolution S-51/1 of 19 Oct 2000 to investigate violations of human rights and humanitarian law in the Occupied Palestinian Territories after 28 September 2000. Economic and Social Council, Commission on Human Rights E/CN 4/2001/121 of 16 March 2001
- Report on Question of the Violation of Human Rights in the Occupied Arab Territories, including Palestine GAOR 56th Session A/56/440 of 4 October 2001
- Report on Question of the Violation of Human Rights in the Occupied Arab Territories, including Palestine ECOSOC Commission on Human Rights E/CN/4/2002/32
- Report on Israeli Practices affecting the Human Rights of the Palestinian People in the Occupied Palestinian Territory GAOR 60th Session A/60/271 of 18 August 2005
- Report on the Situation of Human Rights in the Palestinian Territories occupied by Israel since 1967 ECOSOC Commission on Human Rights E/CN 4/2006/029 of 22 December 2005.

=== Speeches ===
- The judicial process, positivism and civil liberty (1971) ISBN B0006COV9I
- Independent homelands: Failure of a fiction : 1979 presidential address (1979) ISBN B0006E8KNO
- A national strategy for 1980: Presidential address, 1980 (1980) ISBN 0-86982-183-0

=== Lectures ===
- Diplomatic Protection in the Lecture Series of the United Nations Audiovisual Library of International Law
- State Secession in the Lecture Series of the United Nations Audiovisual Library of International Law

=== Textbooks ===
- International Criminal Law and Procedure, with Christine Van Den Wyngaert (1996) ISBN 1-85521-835-6
- Documents on International Law: Handbook for Law Students and Constitutional Lawyers, with Neville Botha, Patric M. Mtshaulana (1996) ISBN 0-7021-3532-1

=== Other writings ===
- "The future of International Law : A Human Rights perspective with some comments on the Leiden School of International Law". Leiden, Rede uitgesproken door Prof.dr. C.J.R. Dugard ter gelegenheid van zijn afscheid als hoogleraar Internationaal Publiekrecht aan de Universiteit Leiden (Lecture, 2007)
- "Diplomatic Protection and Human Rights: The Draft Articles of the International Law Commission". 24 Australian Year Book of International Law, 2005, pp. 75–91.
- "11 September 2001. A Turning Point in International and Domestic Law". In: Eden, P. & O'Donnel, T. (Eds.), The Problem of the Definition of Terrorism in International Law, 2005, pp. 187–205.
- "The Role and Recognition in the Law and Practice of Secession". In: Kohen, M. (Ed.), Secession: International Law Perspectives, 2005, pp. 94–132.
- "Immunity, Human Rights and International Crimes". Journal of South African Law, 2004, 482
- "A Legal Basis for Secession: Relevant Principles and Rules". In Dahlitz, J. (Ed.)Secession and International Law. Conflict Avoidance Regional Appraisals, 2004, pp. 89–96.
