= Erik Jayme =

German jurist (1934–2024)

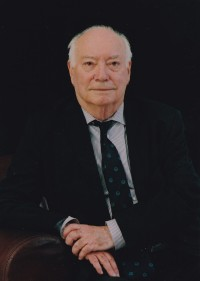
- Born: 8 June 1934; Montreal, Quebec, Canada
- Died: 1 May 2024 (aged 89); Baden-Baden, Baden-Württemberg, Germany
- Citizenship: German
- Scientific career
- Fields: Private law, Private international law, Comparative law
- Institutions: Heidelberg University

Erik Jayme (8 June 1934 – 1 May 2024) was a German jurist. Until his retirement in 2002, he was professor of Private Law, Private International Law and Comparative Law at Heidelberg University. From 1997 to 1999, he served as president of the Institut de Droit International and served as vice president of The Hague Academy of International Law from 2004 to 2024. Jayme died on 1 May 2024, at the age of 89.

== Academic life ==
Jayme was born in Montreal in 1934. In 1973/1974, he was a full professor at the University of Münster, and afterwards he was at LMU Munich. From 1983 to 2002, he was a full professor of Private Law, Private International Law and Comparative Law at Heidelberg University.

== Memberships and honours ==
Jayme was member of the Institut de Droit International whose president he was from 1997 to 1999. From 2004 until his death, he was vice president of the Curatorium of The Hague Academy of International Law. He was honorary doctor of the universities of Ferrara (1991), Budapest (2000), Montpellier (2003), Porto Alegre (UFRGS) (2003) and Coimbra, Académicien titulaire of the Académie internationale de droit comparé (Paris). He was a member of the Heidelberg Academy for Sciences and Humanities (1989), Istituto Veneto di Scienze, Lettere ed Arti (2004) and a foreign member of the Royal Netherlands Academy of Arts and Sciences (2005). In 2008, he received the Order of the Southern Cross.
