= The Garrison State =

Garrison State

The Garrison State is a concept first introduced in a seminal, highly influential and cited 1941 article originally published in the American Journal of Sociology by political scientist and sociologist Harold Lasswell. It was a "developmental construct" that outlined the possibility of a political-military elite composed of "specialists in violence" in a modern state.

Lasswell was particularly influenced by the development of aerial warfare, especially as employed during the Second Sino-Japanese War, which he believed would lead to a "socialization of danger" throughout. His writings preceded and anticipated fire-bombing campaigns in the era of the Vietnam War, including the use of Agent Orange, and beyond, as well as firebombings of Dresden, Tokyo, London, Hamburg and use of atomic bombs on Hiroshima and Nagasaki during World War II.

The Garrison State is a state dominated by the military-industrial complex. President Dwight D. Eisenhower believed that a deep, even paranoid, fear of the military might and superiority of Soviet Union would turn the United States into a "garrison state", with an economy dominated by military spending and civil liberties eroded. The military-industrial complex became a force in itself, consuming a majority of the United States discretionary federal budget at the expense of infrastructure, educational or health spending, spreading fear among the populace and looking for enemies to replace the Soviet Union after the end of the Cold War. The Garrison State is an American political concept not to be confused with the Garrison mentality found in Canadian history and current tradition by Northrop Frye and Margaret Atwood.

== See also ==
- Militarism
- Permanent war economy
- Songun
- Stratocracy

== Bibliography ==
- Lasswell, Harold. "The Garrison State". American Journal of Sociology, Vol. 46, No. 4, January 1941, pp. 455–468. JSTOR 2769918
