= Institute for Environmental Security =

International non-profit organisation

- Abbreviation: IES
- Formation: 2002
- Type: NGO
- Purpose: Advancing Global Environmental Security through Science, Diplomacy, Law, Finance and Education
- Headquarters: The Hague, Netherlands
- Official language: English
- Website: http://www.envirosecurity.org/index.php

The Institute for Environmental Security (IES) is an international non-profit non-governmental organisation established in 2002 in The Hague, Netherlands, with representatives in Brussels, London, Beirut, California, New York City, Toronto and Washington, D.C. The "knowledge and action network" was set up to increase political attention to environmental security as a means to help prevent conflict, instability and unrest.

In 2012 the Peace Palace Library and the Institute for Environmental Security began compiling a research database on the Law of Ecocide.
