= Janne Nijman =

International lawyer

- Born: Janne Elisabeth Nijman; 8 May 1972 (age 54); Geldrop, Netherlands

Academic background
- Education: Eindhovens Protestants Lyceum
- Alma mater: Leiden University (LLM, PhD); University of Strasbourg
- Thesis: The Concept of International Legal Personality: An Inquiry into the History and Theory of International Law (2004)
- Doctoral advisors: John Dugard and Thomas Mertens
- Other advisor: Peter Kooijmans

Academic work
- Discipline: Public international law
- Sub-discipline: History and theory of international law
- Institutions: University of Amsterdam; Graduate Institute of International and Development Studies; T.M.C. Asser Instituut
- Website: University of Amsterdam

Janne Elisabeth Nijman (born 8 May 1972 in Geldrop) is a professor of international law at the University of Amsterdam and at the Graduate Institute of International and Development Studies in Geneva. Her main research interests concern the history and theory of international law, questions of subjectivity in international law, and the role of cities in international law and global governance.

== Career ==
Nijman completed her PhD in law at Leiden University in 1996 under the guidance of John Dugard and Th.J.M. Mertens. She was chairperson of the executive board and academic director of the T.M.C. Asser Instituut in The Hague from 2015 to 2022. Nijman has also held academic positions at Leiden University, New York University, the Johns Hopkins University, and the University of Cambridge.

She was a co-recipient of the Collaborative Book Prize, awarded by the European Society of International Law, for the book “Research Handbook on International Law and Cities”

She is a member of the Christian Democratic Appeal (CDA) and writes a column with Herman Van Rompuy for the magazine Christian Democratic Explorations.
