= Harold Lasswell =

American political scientist (1902–1978)

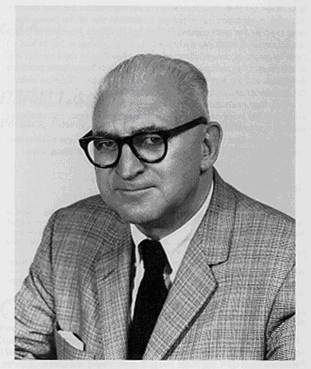
- Born: February 13, 1902; Donnellson, Illinois, U.S.
- Died: December 18, 1978 (aged 76); New York City, U.S.

Academic background
- Education: University of Chicago (BA, PhD)
- Thesis: Propaganda Technique in the World War (1926)
- Influences: Havelock Ellis, Sigmund Freud, Karl Marx, Theodore Reik

Academic work
- Discipline: Political science, communications theory
- Institutions: University of Chicago, Yale University, City University of New York, Temple University
- Notable students: Chen Lung-chu
- Notable ideas: Lasswell's model of communication, content analysis, garrison state, political psychology, policy sciences

Harold Dwight Lasswell (February 13, 1902 – December 18, 1978) was an American political scientist and communications theorist. He was a professor of law at Yale University. He served as president of the American Political Science Association, American Society of International Law, and World Academy of Art and Science.

According to a biographical memorial written by Gabriel Almond at the time of Lasswell's death, and published by the National Academies of Sciences in 1987, Lasswell "ranked among the half dozen creative innovators in the social sciences in the twentieth century." At the time, Almond asserted that "few would question that he was the most original and productive political scientist of his time."

Areas of research in which Lasswell worked included the importance of personality, social structure, and culture in the explanation of political phenomena. Lasswell was associated with the disciplines of communication, political science, psychology, and sociology – however he did not adhere to the distinction between these boundaries, but instead worked to erase the lines drawn to divide these disciplines.

== Biography ==
=== Early life ===
Lasswell was born on February 13, 1902, in Donnellson, Illinois, to a clergyman and a school teacher. An older brother died in childhood.

=== Education ===
During high school, Lasswell served as editor of the school newspaper and gave a valedictory speech at graduation. Some of his early influences included his uncle, a physician who introduced him to the works of Sigmund Freud; and an English teacher, who introduced him to Karl Marx and Havelock Ellis. Excelling in his academics, particularly history and English, Lasswell was awarded a scholarship to the University of Chicago.

In 1918, at the age of 16, Lasswell began his studies at the University of Chicago, where he earned his bachelor's degree in philosophy and economics. He also received a doctorate from the University of Chicago and penned his dissertation on Propaganda Technique in the World War (1927). He also studied at the Universities of London, Geneva, Paris, and Berlin in the 1920s.

=== Teaching career ===
From 1922 to 1938, Lasswell served as an assistant professor and associate professor of political science at the University of Chicago. During this time, Lasswell was granted a postdoctoral fellowship from the Social Sciences Research Council. Lasswell spent a year teaching at the Washington School of Psychiatry from 1938 to 1939, before joining the U.S. Library of Congress as director of war communications research from 1939 to 1945.

During this time, he also taught at the New School of Social Research and Yale Law School. As a visiting lecturer at Yale Law School, Lasswell taught a graduate seminar on "Property in a Crisis Society." He became a full-time faculty member following World War II, which underscored the need for a better understanding of law and theory about law.

Lasswell taught law and political science at Yale University from 1946 to 1970. From 1970 to 1972, he served as a professor of law at the City University of New York's John Jay College. From 1972 to 1976, he served as a distinguished professor at Temple University School of Law, where he retired from teaching. Columbia University also named him the Albert Schweitzer professor of international affairs. After retiring from teaching, Lasswell spent his remaining years working with the Policy Sciences Center.

=== Professional affiliations and honors ===
To institutionalize the policy sciences he was formulating, Lasswell along with Myres McDougal and George Dession created the Policy Sciences Council in 1944 and the Policy Sciences Foundation in 1948.

Lasswell served as president of the American Political Science Association in 1956 and president of the American Society of International Law from 1966 to 1968. He was also involved in the Association for the Advancement of Science, Commission on the Freedom of the Press, Committee for Economic Development, and Rand Corporation.

During the course of his career, Lasswell received many honors, including honorary degrees from the University of Chicago, Columbia University, the University of Illinois, and the Jewish Theological Seminary of America. The American Council of Learned Societies honored him in 1960, calling him a "master of all the social sciences and pioneer in each." He was a fellow of the American Academy of Arts and Sciences and was inducted into the National Academy of Sciences in 1974.

=== Later years ===
Lasswell suffered a massive stroke on December 24, 1977. He died of pneumonia on December 18, 1978.

== Work ==
Publishing between 4 million to 6 million words during his academic career, Lasswell has been described as a "one-man university" whose "competence in, and contributions to, anthropology, communications, economics, law, philosophy, psychology, psychiatry and sociology are enough to make him a political scientist in the model of classical Greece."

Lasswell is considered to be a founding father of political psychology and policy sciences and an early proponent of mass communication as a field of scholarly research. He believed universities should become focal centers for the study of communications.

His five-questions model of communication is considered one of the earliest and most influential models of communication. Many consider him the founder of content analysis, having conducted one of the most comprehensive content analysis studies of his time.

=== Propaganda ===
At the age of 25, Lasswell completed his doctoral dissertation on Propaganda Technique in the World War. He defined propaganda as "the control of opinion by significant symbols" such as stories, rumors, reports, pictures, and other forms of social communication. He also wrote that propaganda is "concerned with the management of opinions and attitudes by the direct manipulation of social suggestion." In his dissertation, Lasswell noted that propaganda is unavoidable and democracies must adjust to it, rather than fight it.

His definition of propaganda was viewed as an important development to understanding the goal of propaganda. Lasswell's studies on propaganda produced breakthroughs on the subject, which broadened current views on the means and stated objectives that could be achieved through propaganda to include not only the change of opinions but also change in actions. He inspired the definition given by the Institute for Propaganda Analysis: "Propaganda is the expression of opinions or actions carried out deliberately by individuals or groups with a view to influence the opinions or actions of other individuals or groups for predetermined ends through psychological manipulations."

His study of political and wartime propaganda represented an important early type of communication study. Propaganda analysis has been absorbed into the general body of communication research, though the word propaganda later gained a negative connotation.

=== Content analysis ===
Lasswell's study of propaganda and the psychoanalytic biographies of political leaders led to his invention of systematic content analysis, the study of communication documents to examine patterns, and its uses in World War II. In 1935, Lasswell published World Politics and Personal Insecurity, a study of international relations using quantitative content analysis. The study included direct observation of the aggressive behavior of welfare clients toward public relief administrators.

Expanding on his work, Lasswell contributed to a wartime communications project sponsored by the Library of Congress. Language of Politics: Studies in Quantitative Semantics is thought to be "one of the most comprehensive single content analysis study ever undertaken with scholarly objectives."

He pioneered such content analysis methods as standardizing the collection of information, developing categories of analysis, and using quantitative measurements to study communication messages. In the next two decades, Lasswell and his associates worked to apply content analysis to a variety of subject matters.

Lasswell wanted to use knowledge to solve public problems. He believed, like John Dewey, that one should pay close attention to the contexts in which concepts were used. For example, social scientists should express their ideas through sentences, not single words, to provide full context.

One criticism of content analysis is its inability to study communication effects. While Lasswell's concept of content analysis allows for inferences about data, its weakness is its ability to verify the data.

=== Political psychology ===
Lasswell's work was also important in the post-World War II development of behavioralism. Lasswell is credited with being the founder of the field of political psychology, the intersection of psychology and political science, in the 1930s and 1940s.

His works on political psychology include Psychopathology and Politics, World Politics and Personal Insecurity, and Power and Personality.

His psychoanalytic study of political leaders introduced Freudian psychoanalytic theory to the social sciences and focused on power dynamics. Lasswell was particularly influenced by Freud's ideas of the aimlessness of instinctual drives and the malleability of human perspectives. In Politics: Who Gets What, When, How, he viewed the elite as the primary holders of power.

While studying in Vienna and Berlin with Theodor Reik, a devotee of Freud, Lasswell was able to appropriate Freud's methods. Lasswell built a laboratory in his social science office at the University of Chicago to conduct experiments on volunteers and students. Lasswell also used psychoanalytical interviewing and recording methods that he appropriated from his time of studying with Elton Mayo at Harvard University.

=== Garrison state ===
Lasswell introduced the concept of a "garrison state" in a highly influential and often cited 1941 article originally published in the American Journal of Sociology. It was a "developmental construct" that outlined the possibility of a political-military elite composed of "specialists in violence" in a modern state.

=== Model of communication ===
Lasswell's five-question model of communication, which focuses on "who (says) what (to) whom (in) what channel (with) what effect," led to the emphasis in communication study on determining effects. First published in Lasswell's 1948 book, The Structure and Function of Communication in Society, the model aims to organize the "scientific study of the process of communication."

Most criticism of Lasswell's model focuses on its simplicity and its lack of relevance due to its linear orientation. Other scholars object to its lack of a feedback loop, that it does not take into consideration the effects of noise, and that it does not address the influences of context on communication.

=== Policy sciences ===
External audio
- Harold D. Lasswell speaking at UCLA on making knowledge more effective in action. May 13, 1970.

In the 1950s to 1970s, Lasswell helped create the policy sciences, an interdisciplinary movement to integrate social science knowledge with public action. Lasswell was concerned with such questions as how to improve the concepts and procedures of those who study political problems professionally, and how to train policy scientists.

Lasswell’s 1956 book, The Decision Process: Seven Categories of Functional Analysis, outlined seven stages of policy decision-making: intelligence, promotion, prescription, invocation, application, termination, and appraisal. The seven stages have been criticized for their construct as a policy cycle or a linear process. He also identified eight "goal values" of policy: wealth, power, respect, rectitude, skill, well being, enlightenment, and affection.

His 1963 book, The Future of Political Science, explored the political scientist's decision process in both official and unofficial policymaking contexts.

Lasswell co-authored Jurisprudence for a Free Society in 1966 along with McDougal. The book examines legal, official, and unofficial decisions that contribute to public and civic order. Policies and how they are made cannot be understood without examining the larger social process.

In his 1971 book, A Pre-View of the Policy Sciences, Lasswell prioritized five "intellectual tasks" of the policy scientist: goal clarification, trend description, analysis of conditions, projection of developments, and provision of alternatives.

=== Human rights and future implications ===
In his 1956 presidential address to the American Political Science Association, Lasswell raised the question of whether or not we should give human rights to robots. His overall message was that technological innovation and the Cold War meant the nation's future was at stake. Political science, according to Lasswell, needed to provide clear goals, "theoretical models of the political process," and develop policy alternatives to maximize democratic values. Lasswell believed political science should be practiced like law, as a free profession rather than an academic pursuit.

In 1980, Lasswell and his associates published Human Rights and World Public Order to present a "comprehensive framework of inquiry" from which to approach international human rights law, and international law.

== Publications ==
Some of Lasswell's publications include:

=== Books ===
- Propaganda Technique in the World War, Ph.D. dissertation (1927)
- "Personality studies," Chicago: An Experiment in Social Science Research (1929)
- Psychopathology and Politics (1930)
- Propaganda and Promotional Activities: An Annotated Bibliography (1935)
- World Politics and Personal Insecurity (1935)
- Politics: Who Gets What, When, How (1936)
- World Revolutionary Propaganda: A Chicago Study (1939)
- Propaganda, Communication, and Public Opinion: A Comprehensive Reference Guide (1946)
- World Politics Faces Economics (1945)
- The Analysis of Political Behaviour: An Empirical Approach (1948)
- Power and Personality (1948)
- The Structure and Function of Communication in Society (1948)
- Language of Politics: Studies in Quantitative Semantics (1949)
- National Security and Individual Freedom (1950)
- Power and Society: A Framework for Political Inquiry (1950)
- Political Writings: Representative Selections (1951)
- The Policy Sciences: Recent Developments in Scope and Method (1951)
- "Democratic character," The Political Writings of Harold D. Lasswell (1951)
- The Comparative Study of Elites (1952)
- The Comparative Study of Symbols (1952)
- The Decision Process: Seven Categories of Functional Analysis (1956)
- Studies in World Public Order (1960)
- In Defense of Public Order: The Emerging Field of Sanction Law (1961)
- The Future of Political Science (1963)
- Law and Public Order in Space (1963)
- Power, Corruption, and Rectitude (1963)
- World Handbook of Political and Social Indicators (1964)
- World Revolutionary Elites: Studies in Coercive Ideological Movements (1965)
- The Sharing of Power in a Psychiatric Hospital (1966)
- The Interpretation of Agreements and World Public Order: Principles of Content and Procedure (1967)
- Political Communication: Public Language of Political Elites in India and the US (1969)
- "Toward a general theory of directed value accumulation and institutional development," Political and Administrative Development (1969)
- Peasants, Power, and Applied Social Change: Vicos as a Model (1971)
- A Pre-View of Policy Sciences (1971)
- The Search for World Order: Studies by Students and Colleagues of Quincy Wright (1971)
- Policy Sciences and Population (1975)
- Values and Development: Praising Asian Experience (1976)
- The Signature of Power: Buildings, Communication and Policy (1979)
- Human Rights and World Public Order: The Basic Policies of an International Law of Human Dignity (1980)
- Propaganda and Communication in World History (1980)

=== Articles ===
- "Two forgotten studies in political psychology," American Political Science Review (1925)
- "Types of political personalities," Proceedings of the American Sociological Society (1927)
- "Personality system and its substitutive reactions," Journal of Abnormal Psychology (1929)
- "The study of the ill as a method of research into political personalities," American Political Science Review (1929)
- "Psychoanalytic interviews as a method of research on personalities," Childs Emotions (1930)
- "The scientific study of human biography," The Scientific Monthly (1930)
- "Self-analysis and judicial thinking," International Journal of Ethics (1930)
- "The measurement of public opinion," American Political Science Review (1931)
- "Triple-appeal principle: A contribution of psychoanalysis to political and social science," American Journal of Sociology (1932)
- "Verbal references and physiological changes during the psychoanalytic interview: A preliminary communication," The Psychoanalytic Review (1935)
- "Certain prognostic changes during trial (psychoanalytic) interviews," The Psychoanalytic Review (1936)
- "A method of interlapping observation in the study of personality in culture," Journal of Abnormal Psychology (1937)
- "What psychiatrists and political scientists can learn from one another," Psychiatry (1938)
- "The garrison state," American Journal of Sociology (1941)
- "Legal education and public policy: Professional training in the public interest," Yale Law Journal (1943)
- "The political science of science: An inquiry into the possible reconciliation of mastery and freedom," American Political Science Review (1956)
- "Political constitution and character," The Psychoanalytic Review (1959)
- "The qualitative and quantitative in political and legal analysis," Daedalus: Journal of the American Academy of Arts and Sciences (1959)
- "The identification and appraisal of diverse systems of public order," American Journal of International Law (1959)
- "The common frontiers of psychiatry and law," American Journal of Psychiatry (1960)
- "Cooperation for research in psychiatry and law," American Journal of Psychiatry (1961)
- "Theories about international law: Prologue to a configurative jurisprudence," Virginia Journal of International Law (1968)
