= Hague Academic Coalition =

The Hague Academic Coalition (HAC) is a consortium of academic institutions in the fields of international relations, international law and international development.

== Members and Organization ==
The member institutions are:

- Carnegie Foundation
- The Hague Academy of International Law
- Hague Institute for the Internationalisation of Law (HiiL)
- International Institute of Social Studies of Erasmus University Rotterdam (ISS)
- Leiden University Campus The Hague
- Netherlands Institute of International Relations 'Clingendael'
- The Hague University of Applied Sciences
- T.M.C. Asser Instituut

The board of the Hague Academic Coalition consists of:

- Prof. Dr. J. de Vries (Campus The Hague) - President
- Mr. S. van Hoogstraten (Carnegie Foundation) - Vice President
- Prof. Dr. L.J. de Haan (ISS) - Treasurer
- Drs. A.S. Gerards (Hague Academic Coalition) - Secretary
- Dr. A.S. Muller (HiiL)
- Mr. R.K. Brons (The Hague University of Applied Sciences)
- Prof. Dr. J. Colijn (Clingendael)
- Mrs. A. O'Brien (T.M.C. Asser Instituut)
- Mr. F.W.H. van den Emster (Raad voor de Rechtspraak) - In an advisory capacity

== Current programmes and activities ==
- The Hague Forum for Judicial Expertise (HFJE), providing high level training to judges, magistrates and prosecutors.
- The Hague Justice Portal (HJP), providing up to date information about the activities of international courts, tribunals and other international organisations based in The Hague.
- A programme aimed at the digitalisation of the historic jurisprudence of the Permanent Court of Arbitration.
- Its annual conferences entitled "From Peace to Justice", focusing on specific subjects related to international law, peace and justice
- Regular HAC lectures: public lectures aimed at enhancing the discussion in The Hague on topics related to peace and justice
