= George Grafton Wilson =

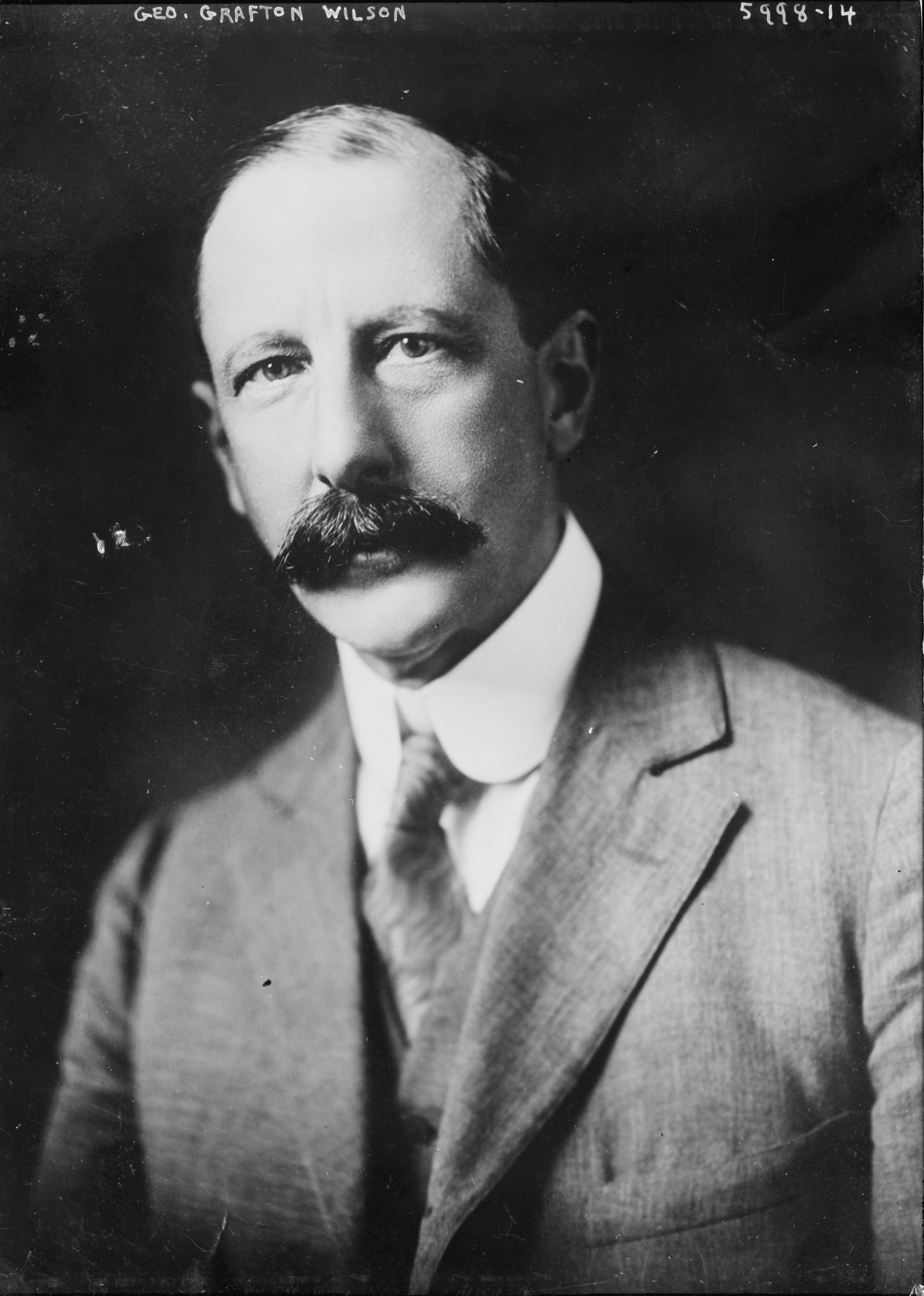
Wilson c. 1920–1925

George Grafton Wilson (Plainfield, Connecticut, 29 March 1863 – Cambridge, Massachusetts, 30 April 1951) was a professor of International Law during the first half of the 20th century. He served on the faculties of Brown University, Harvard University, The Fletcher School of Law and Diplomacy, and the U.S. Naval War College.

== Early life and education ==
The son of Archibald A. Wilson and his wife, Betsey L. Brown, Wilson earned all three of his academic degrees at Brown University, taking his Bachelor of Arts in 1886, his Master of Arts in 1888 and his Doctor of Philosophy in 1891. He went to Europe and studied at Heidelberg University, Berlin University, University of Paris and Oxford University in 1890-91. On his return, he married Elizabeth Rose on June 30, 1891, with whom he was to have four children: Grafton Lee Wilson, Miriam Wilson (Mrs. Paul Harrison Arthur), Rose Wilson (Mrs. Harry Gray Anderson), and Brayton Fuller Wilson.

== Academic career ==
Wilson's first appointment was as principal of schools, Groton, Connecticut, 1886–87, and then Principal, Rutland High School, Rutland, Vermont in 1889-90. In 1891, Brown University appointed him associate professor of social and political sciences and he was promoted to full professor in 1894. In 1910, Harvard University appointed him professor of International Law, an academic post he held until he retired in 1936.

During this same period, he served as professor of International Law at the U.S. Naval War College from 1900 to 1937. In addition, he was appointed professor of International Law at the Fletcher School of Law and Diplomacy in 1933 for a number of years. He served as special counsel, U.S. Maritime Commn., 1941–1945; lecturer in International Law at the University of Hawaiʻi, 2d semester, 1937.

On overseas assignments, he was an American delegate plenipotentiary to the London Naval Conference in 1908-09; counselor at the American Legation at The Hague during the early period of World War I from 1914. He served as an exchange professor to France in 1912-13. At the Hague in August 1914 Wilson aided U.S. Minister Henry Van Dyke to alleviate the distress of American travelers stranded in Europe by the war. He served as Legal adviser for the U.S. mission for return of Dutch ships in 1919 and was a member of the legal staff at the Washington Naval Conference in 1921-22. In 1923, he was lecturer at The Hague Academy of International Law. He was the American member of the International Commission for the United States and The Netherlands in 1928. In 1928, he was designated by Nicaragua as member of the International Central American Tribunal.

He served as a member of the board of editors of the American Journal of International Law from 1907, becoming Law editor-in-chief, 1924–43 and then honorary editor-in-chief from 1943. He was also director of the Revue de Droit International from 1913 and Membre de l’Institut de Droit International; member of the American Philosophical Society; fellow and later vice president of the American Academy of Arts and Sciences and vice president of the American Society of International Law.

== Published works ==
- Town and City Government in Providence, (1899)
- Insurgency, (1900)
- Submarine Telegraph Cables in Their International Relations, (1901)
- International Law Situations, U.S. Naval War College, editor for 36 annual volumes, (1902–37)
- International Law (with George Fox Tucker), (1901, ten additions to 1937)
- L'Insurrection, (1902)
- International Law, Hornbook series, (1910, 3d edit., 1939)
- The Hague Arbitration Cases, (1915)
- The First Year of the League of Nations, (1921)
- Wheaton’s International Law, Editor of centenary edition; Carnegie classics, (1936)
