= Jamshid Momtaz =

Iranian jurist and academic (born 1942)

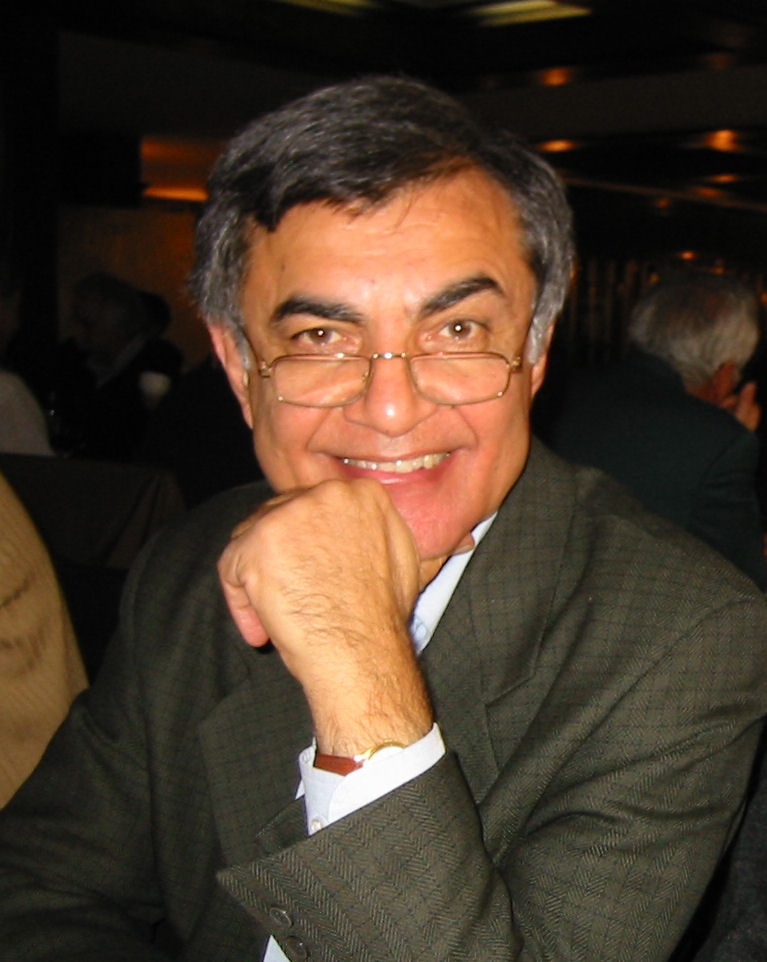
Jamshid Momtaz

Jamshid Momtaz (born 18 June 1942 in İzmir) is an Iranian jurist and academic.

He earned his degree in public law at the Faculty of Law and Economy from University of Paris (1966).

In 1968, he graduated from the Institut d'études politiques de Paris and held his PhD in public law at the Faculty of Law, Economics and Social Sciences of Panthéon-Assas University (1971).

He started his career as assistant professor in University of Paris X (Nanterre, France) in 1968 and pursued in Iran since 1974 as professor at the University of Tehran.

From 1979 to 1982, he chaired the Center for International Studies of the University of Tehran.

Meanwhile, as an academic, Jamshid Momtaz has held teaching courses at home and abroad since 1969 at different institutions including Institut des hautes études internationales in Paris, University of Law, Economics and Social Sciences, Paris II, University of Paris X (Paris Ouest Nanterre, La Défense), University of Grenoble II (Mendes France), University of Paris XI (Jean Monnet), University of Paris XIII (Villetaneuse), University of Caen (Basse-Normandie) and visiting professor at the University of Paris I (Panthéon Sorbonne) . He is currently teaching International humanitarian law at the School of International Relations (SIR) affiliated with the Iranian ministry of foreign affairs to the next generations of Iranian diplomats.

He was an advisor to the Ministry of Foreign Affairs of the Islamic Republic of Iran and former member of the International Law Commission of the United Nations from 2000 until 2006 (president of the same committee at its 57th session in 2005–2006) . He is a Fellow of the Institute of International Law (Institut de Droit International) and member of several organizations :

- International Committee of Red Cross (ICRC) Group of International Adviser .
- Curatorium of The Hague Academy of International Law .
- Board of Editors of the Yearbook of International Humanitarian Law (T.M.C. Asser Institute, Netherlands) .
- Steering Committee for the International Committee of Red Cross (ICRC), Study on International Customary Law (1996–2004).
- Commission for the Settlement of Disputes Related to Confidentiality, Organisation for the Prohibition of Chemical Weapons (OPCW), 1994–2004.
- More information available on Jamshid Momtaz site: http://djamchidmomtaz.com

As an expert, Jamshid Momtaz was part of the Iranian delegation in charge of nuclear talks with major powers (G5+1).

== Articles and chapters in edited works ==
Dr Momtaz is the author of more than 90 publications including books, chapters in edited works, articles in journals and yearbooks in French, English and Persian on diverse issues of international law.

- Le droit international humanitaire applicable aux conflits armés non internationaux, Collected Courses of the Hague Academy of International Law, Tome 292, 2001, Martinus Nijhoff Publishers, The Hague/Boston/London 2002.
- Les actions au cours d'un conflit armé, in studi di Diritto Internazionale in Onore di Gaetano Arangio Ruiz, Editoriale Scientifica, 2004
- Le recours à l'arme nucléaire et la protection de l'environnement : l'apport de la Cour internationalede Justice, In International Law, the International Court of Justice and Nuclear Weapons, Laurence Boisson de Chazournes and Philippe Sands (Editors), Cambridge University Press 1999.
- Did the Court Miss an Opportunity to Denounce the Erosion of the Principle Prohibiting the Use of Force ? Symposium Reflections on the ICJ's Oil Platforms Decisions, Yale Journal of International Law, Vol. 29, Number 29, Summer 2004.
- "Attribution of Conduct to the State: State Organs and Entities Empowered to Exercise Elements of Governmental Autorithy", James Crawford, Alain Pellet and Simon Olleson Edited by Oxford University Press (2010)
- More information on Jamshid Momtaz website: http://djamchidmomtaz.com
- "Créer une zone exempte d’armes nucléaires au Moyen-Orient : une mission impossible ?" The 90th Birthday of Boutros Boutros-Ghali. Tribute of the Curatorial to its President. A Publication of The Hague Academy of International Law Martinus Nijhoff Publishers Leiden, Boston (2012).
- "La délimitation du plateau continental du Golfe Persique: une entreprise inachevée", Law of the Sea from Grotius to the International Tribunal for the Law of the Sea, Liber Amicorum Judge Hugo Caminos, Lilian Del Castillo. Edited by Brill Nijhoff (2015)
- "L’attachement de la Cour internationale de justice au consensualisme judiciaire est-il sans faille ?" The Limits of International Law: Essays in honour of Joe Verhoeven, Bruylant Larmier (2015)
- Garantir la nature exclusivement pacifique du programme nucléaire de l'Iran (Le plan d'action conjoint du 24 novembre 2013) in Nuclear Weapons: Strengthening the International Legal Regime, Eleven International Publishing (2016)

== Books ==
- Le droit international humanitaire applicable aux conflits armés non internationaux, Receuil des cours de l’Académie de droit international, Tome 292, 2001, Martinus Nijhoff Publishers, The Hague / Boston / London (2002)
- Rules and Institutions of International Humanitarian Law Put to the Test of Recent Armed Conflicts, with M.J. Mathewson, Hague Academy of International Law, Martinus Nijhoff Publishers Leiden, Boston (2010)

== Lectures ==
- La sécession en droit international in the Lecture Series of the United Nations Audiovisual Library of International Law
- Le droit international humanitaire applicable aux conflits armés non internationaux in the Lecture Series of the United Nations Audiovisual Library of International Law
- Centre for International Legal Studies School of International Studies, Jawaharlal Nehru University (2006)
- Training Program in Multilateral Diplomacy and International Affairs Management, UNITAR, The Hague, July 1991, August 2005, July 2007
- United Nations Audio Visual Library of International LawLecture Series, Le droit international humanitaire applicable aux conflits armés non internationaux (2007)
- El Magreb y Oriente Media en la Sociedad Internacional Contemporana, Casa Arabe Madrid Universidad de Jaen, Universidad de Cordoba, Spain (2009)
- United Regional Courses on International Law, Hague Academy of International Law (2014)
- United Regional Courses on International Law, Addis-Ababa, Ethiopia (2012)
- United Nations Audio Visual Library of International Law Lecture Series, La sécession en droit international (2015)
- Institut international des droits de l'homme, Strasbourg, France 2015 et 20116
