= Herbert Kraus =

German professor of public international law

- Born: 2 January 1884; Rostock, Germany
- Died: 15 March 1965 (aged 81); Göttingen, Germany
- Occupation: Professor of International Law
- Spouse: Katharina Hobson-Kraus

Herbert Kraus (2 January 1884 – 15 March 1965) was a German professor of public international law. He was the first director of the Institute of International Law at the University of Göttingen. Due to his criticism of Nazism he was forced to retire between 1937 and 1945.

== Early life and education (1884-1928) ==
Herbert Kraus was born in Rostock. He studied law from 1904 to 1908 in Heidelberg, Leipzig and Berlin. In 1908 he completed his Ph.D. and completed his 2nd State Law Exam (German Bar Admission) in Saxony in 1911.

During a subsequent stay at Columbia University and Harvard University he completed his habilitation on “The Monroe Doctrine and its relations with American Diplomacy and Public International Law” (”Die Monroedoktrin und ihre Beziehung zur Amerikanischen Diplomatie und zum Völkerrecht“) . He spent the winter term 1913/1914 in Paris at the Sorbonne and received his habilitation in summer 1914 from the University of Leipzig.

During World War I Kraus served in the German civil administration in Belgium. Between 1917 and 1919 he worked in the division for legal affairs of the German Foreign Office (Auswärtiges Amt). He took part in the negotiations of the Treaty of Brest-Litowsk and the Treaty of Versailles.

== Academic career (1928-1937) ==
In 1919 he was Privatdozent in Leipzig. 1920 he became Professor extraordinarius and 1923 Professor ordinarius at the University of Königsberg where he taught constitutional law and international law. In summer 1927 he taught at The Hague Academy of International Law (again in 1934). As one of the first German professors he was invited to teach at summer schools in Chicago and Philadelphia.

1928 he was called to the chair for general international law at the University of Göttingen. In 1930 he founded the Institute of International Law at the University of Göttingen where he was the Ph.D.-supervisor of Adam von Trott zu Solz, involved in the 20 July Plot.

== Forced retirement (1937-1945) ==
After the Nazis seized power, the so-called Machtergreifung, Kraus had to face hostilities by Nazi authorities. He published his criticism of the Nazi foreign policy in 1934 in a work titled “The crisis of inter-state thought“ („Die Krise des zwischenstaatlichen Denkens“). In this work he argued in favor of a certain binding minimal moral standards. Though he criticized the Treaty of Versailles, he also called Adolf Hitler a „fool“. In several subsequent articles he also criticized Carl Schmitt´s understanding of international law. After 4 years of hostilities Kraus was removed from all offices in 1937, forced to retire and banned from publishing.

Kraus moved to Dresden where he undertook 1937-1938 some work commissioned by Columbia University. Subsequently he worked on a textbook of international law and a book on Georg Friedrich von Martens but the drafts of these works were destroyed in the Dresden bombing in February 1945.

== Post-war period (1945-1965) ==
1945 Kraus was reinstated as professor in Göttingen.

However, he did not return to Göttingen before 1947 because he was defense counsel of the former president of the Reichsbank Hjalmar Schacht at the Nuremberg Trials.

Back in Göttingen he worked on rebuilding the Institute of International Law and matters concerning the status of the former eastern territories of Germany under international law.

He was one of the founders of Gettingen working group (Göttinger Arbeitskreis) in 1948.

He was chairman of the advisory group of the Federal German Government on the Treaty of Paris (1951).

Kraus retired in 1953. In 1964 he was awarded the Federal Great Cross of Merit with Star of the Bundesverdienstkreuz. He died in Göttingen in 1965.

== Private life ==
Herbert Kraus was married to the American sculptor Katharina Hobson-Kraus (born 1889). She left Germany in 1935 and they divorced in 1939. He later remarried and had two sons from his second marriage, one of which is the German diplomat Reinhart Kraus.

== Works (extract) ==
- Die Monroedoktrin und ihre Beziehung zur Amerikanischen Diplomatie und zum Völkerrecht, Berlin, 1913. (in German)
- Interesse und zwischenstaatliche Ordnung, NZIR, Bd. 49, 1934, S. 22-65. (in German)
- Carl Schmitt, Nationalsozialismus und Völkerrecht, NZIR, Bd. 50, 1935, S. 151-161. (in German)
- Internationale Gegenwartsfragen – Völkerrecht, Staatsethik, internationale Politik, Würzburg, 1963. (in German)

== Literature ==
- Heiko Meiertöns: An International Lawyer in Democracy and Dictatorship - Re-Introducing Herbert Kraus, in: EJIL, Vol. 25 (2014), pp. 255–286.
- Dietrich Rauschning, Herbert Kraus (1884-1965), in: Die Albertus-Magnus-Universität zu Königsberg und ihre Professoren (Hrsg: Dietrich Rauschning, Donata v. Nereé), Berlin: Duncker & Humblot, 1994, S. 371-382. (in German)
- Frank Halfmann: Eine „Pflanzstätte bester nationalsozialistischer Rechtsgelehrter“: Die juristische Abteilung der Rechts- und Staatswissenschaftlichen Fakultät, in: Die Universität Göttingen unter dem Nationalsozialismus (Hrsg.: Heinrich Becker u.a.), München u.a.: K.G. Saur, 1987 (in German)
