= Myres S. McDougal =

American lawyer

Myres Smith McDougal (November 23, 1906 – May 7, 1998) was an American scholar of international law and Sterling Professor of International Law at the Yale Law School, where he taught for fifty years. He also taught at New York Law School. He was an influential proponent of a "policy-oriented" approach to international law that became associated with Yale Law School.

== Early life and education ==
McDougal was born in Burton, Mississippi in 1906. He received undergraduate and LL.B. degrees from the University of Mississippi, where he taught classics for two years. He then was a Rhodes Scholar at St. John's College in Oxford University, from which he received a B.C.L. in 1930, and then received a J.S.D. from Yale Law School in 1931.

== Career ==
He began teaching property law at Yale in 1934, after spending several years at the University of Illinois in Urbana. During World War II he served as assistant general counsel of the US Lend-Lease Administration in 1942 and general counsel of the US State Department's Office of Foreign Relief and Rehabilitation Operations. After the war he returned to the Yale Law School and achieved recognized distinction in the field of international law. Professor McDougal served on the US delegation to the 1969 UN conference in Vienna that produced the Convention on the Law of Treaties. Second Circuit Judge José A. Cabranes said of him, "Myres McDougal was, without a doubt, the greatest international lawyer of his time."

McDougal's books included:

- The law school of the future: From legal realism to policy science in the world community (1947)
- Property, wealth, land: Allocation, planning and development; selectedcases and other materials on the law of real property, an introduction (1948)
- Law and Minimum World Public Order (1961)
- The Public Order of the Oceans: A Contemporary International Law of the Sea (1962) (with William T. Burke)
- Law and Public Order in Space (1963) (with Harold D. Lasswell)
- Human Rights and World Public Order: The Basic Policies of an International Law of Human Dignity (1980) (with Harold D. Lasswell and Chen Lung-chu)
- The International Law of War: Transnational Coercion and World Public Order (1994) (with Florentino P. Feliciano)

His students included: Byron R. White, Bill Clinton, Nicholas Katzenbach, and José A. Cabranes.

As a property scholar, McDougal was famous for asking the question, later asked and answered in United States v. Willow River Power Co., whether the courts protect an asserted interest because it is a property right or is it a property right because the courts protect it. Professor McDougal was also famous for popularizing in legal analysis the concept of hierarchy of values, and the fact that different jurists' or analysts' resolution of particular legal controversies could be explained as the result of their having different hierarchies of values. McDougal wrote the amicus brief " Presidential Treaty Termination", generally credited with the District Court ruling against President Carter's unilateral termination of the US Taiwan mutual defense treaty. (McDougal and Joseph A Strauss) NYLS, 1980.

McDougal was president of the American Society of International Law and was president of the Association of American Law Schools.

== Lectures ==
Reflections on the New Haven School in the Lecture Series of the United Nations Audiovisual Library of International Law

== See also ==
- Yale Law Journal, March 1, 1999 – Issue devoted to Testimonial to late Yale Law School Professor Myres McDougal.
- Bonnie Collier, "A Conversation with Myres S. McDougal", Yale Law School Oral History Series, Book 4 (2013).
- Video interview at Yale.
