= Marcus Daly (politician) =

American politician

- Daly in 1958

3rd Director General of the International Organization for Migration
- In office May 14, 1958 – October 3, 1961
- Preceded by: Harold H. Tittmann Jr.
- Succeeded by: Bastiaan W. Haveman

Member of the Monmouth County Board of Chosen Freeholders
- In office January 2, 1963 – July 25, 1969
- Preceded by: Earl L. Woolley

Personal details
- Born: September 18, 1908 Long Branch, New Jersey, US
- Died: July 25, 1969 (aged 60)
- Party: Republican
- Spouse: Lucille Burke
- Children: 1 daughter
- Education: Lehigh University; The Hague Academy of International Law
- Alma mater: Georgetown University School of Foreign Service; Columbia University (MA)
- Occupation: Business
- Known for: Director General of the Intergovernmental Committee for European Migration (ICEM) 1958-1961

Marcus Daly (September 18, 1908 – July 25, 1969) was an American businessman who served as Director General of the Intergovernmental Committee for European Migration (ICEM) from 1958 until 1961. An American Republican Party politician, he also served on the Monmouth County Board of Chosen Freeholders from January 2, 1963 until his death, and was a candidate for the United States House of Representatives from New Jersey's 3rd congressional district in the 1964 and 1968.

== Background ==
Daly was born in Long Branch, New Jersey, to Thomas F. and Josephine E. Daly. His father, Thomas, was an Irish immigrant from County Cavan, and a cousin of Copper King Marcus Daly. One of his brothers, Thomas F. Daly II, was a trial lawyer with the firm Lord, Day & Lord, and briefed New York Times Co. v. Sullivan before the United States Supreme Court. His other brother was John L. Daly.

Daly married the former Lucille Burke of Plainfield, New Jersey. They had one daughter.

He attended Lehigh University for two years, studied International Law for three months in 1929 at The Hague Academy of International Law, earning a certificate, and then was a 1930 graduate of the Georgetown University School of Foreign Service. He received a master's degree in Political Science from Columbia University in 1949.

He lectured on contemporary civilization, international law and political science in several places, including Fordham University, Hunter College, St. Peter's College in Jersey City, New Jersey, the Johns Hopkins School of International Studies in Bologna, Italy, and the Pontifical University in Bogotá, Colombia.

Daly's primary employment, however, was in business, handling investments for the Shelly Brewing Company of Newark, New Jersey. He later founded his own insurance and investment company. An active athlete, he enjoyed water polo as a young man and golf later in life. He was also a horse breeder and enjoyed horseback riding. The New York Times described him as being "rugged-looking" and "ruddy-faced," having "a flashing smile and a flashing temper."

== International relations ==
In 1958, Daly was nominated by President Eisenhower to be the Director General of the Intergovernmental Committee for European Migration (ICEM). ICEM was dedicated to the resettlement of European World War II refugees, both in the United States and overseas. It is now known as the International Organization for Migration (IOM), now with 166 member states and offices in over 100 countries.

The only candidate for the position, Daly was elected unanimously to the post by the then-28 member governments of ICEM. Daly was Director General of the organization until 1961, and he oversaw the movement of at least one million migrants to such places as Australia, Brazil, Argentina, Chile, Colombia, the United States, and elsewhere.

His appointment was controversial, as he had no prior foreign relations experience, though it had been a long-time interest of his. He immediately became a focus of dispute as he attempted to use "businesslike methods" to cut the staff and budget of the ICEM, describing some employees as incompetent and disloyal. In turn the staff described him as arrogant and heavy-handed. When he complained that "nobody around here likes me," a staffer agreed, later telling the New York Times, "he couldn't have been more right." But about a year into the job, matters appeared to have settled down.

== Awards ==
Daly received the Grand Croix of Merit avec Plaque and Cordon of the Sovereign Military Order of Malta in 1961 for his work in international social welfare. In 1962, Pope John XXIII named Marcus Daly a Knight Commander of the Order of St. Gregory the Great, for work in the international field and his dedication to human welfare.

In 1962, Daly was awarded honorary degrees from Monmouth College and St. Peter's College as a Doctor of Letters and a Doctor of Laws, respectively.

== Political activities ==
He was a member of the board of governors of Riverview Hospital, Red Bank. He was re-elected to the board of trustees of Monmouth College in 1968. He had served as a trustee since 1962. Daly was a member of the American International Law Association, the Catholic Association for International Peace, the American Committee for Italian Migration and the Holy Name Society.

On January 2, 1963, Daly, by then a Lincroft resident, was appointed to the Monmouth County Board of Chosen Freeholders to fill the unexpired term of Freeholder Earl L. Woolley, who had resigned due to poor health. Daly chaired the committee on public welfare and a member of the Monmouth County Welfare Board. He became the center of a controversy in 1967 involving his proposal to deal with welfare aid to unwed mothers whereby their names would be referred to the County Prosecutor for criminal charges. In spite of this controversy, he was re-elected in 1968. On November 15, 1966 he appeared as a guest on the David Susskind Show.

In 1964, he made an unsuccessful bid for the Congressional seat of retiring Representative James C. Auchincloss, running against James J. Howard, the Democratic candidate. Auchincloss endorsed Daly to fill his seat after announcing in January 1964 that he would not be running for re-election. In 1968, Daly again challenged Howard for the seat; he was forced to withdraw because of ill health.

Daly died of cancer on July 25, 1969.
