= Hierarchy of values =

Hierarchy of values is a concept in US legal analysis that Yale Law School and New York Law School Professor Myres McDougal popularized. It refers to an ordered list of social values that influence judicial decision-making. Different jurists or legal analysts may order values in different hierarchies, which leads them to decide particular controversies differently. One jurist may value predictability and certainty of expectation very highly and value fine-tuning the result to the equities of the individual case somewhat lower, while another might order these values in the other direction. Accordingly, in a given case, one jurist might well reach a result contrary to that which the other jurist reached.

== Examples ==
A 2002 study group concluded that "there was no well-developed and authoritative hierarchy of values in international law."

An example of a value hierarchy in the sense that MacDougal uses it is found in Paideia. Abraham Maslow created a table of two columns of opposing value hierarchies, supposedly reflecting competing social paradigms.
