= The Hague Justice Portal =

Online portal on international justice

- Website type: Justice
- Available in: Dutch; French; English
- Creator: Hague Academic Coalition
- Website: http://www.haguejusticeportal.net/
- Commercial: No
- Launched: 6 April 2006

The Hague Justice Portal (in French: Portail judiciaire de La Haye) is a website that promotes and provides increased access to the institutions, courts, and organisations in The Hague, The Netherlands, working in the field of international peace, justice, and security. The Portal project was created by the Hague Academic Coalition and was officially launched by Her Royal Highness Princess Margriet of the Netherlands in The Hague on 6 April 2006.

The Portal is a gateway to the legal activities taking place in The Hague; a city which, in the words of former United Nations Secretary-General, Mr. Kofi Annan, "amply deserves its reputation as the International City of Peace and Justice".

In addition to the core legal institutions in The Hague, such as the International Court of Justice, the International Criminal Court and the International Criminal Tribunal for the former Yugoslavia, the Portal also provides access to the work and development of a large number of other international organisations, institutes, and research centres based in The Hague, which are relevant to the pursuit of international peace, justice, and security.

The management of the Portal was transferred to a committee led by Philipp Amann on 1 March 2014, and a new stream-lined version of the website was created. The new committee are based in The Hague and have a strong vision for the future of the site.

== Sections of the Portal ==
The Portal itself comprises five main sections: "News and Events", "Projects", "Academic Research", "The Hague" and "Portal".

News and Events: The news section includes up-to-date information about what happens in the international courts and about their judgments and decisions, issued from official sources and edited by legal experts. The event calendar announces legal events, conferences, lectures, and speeches taking place in The Hague.

Academic Research: The main point of the Portal, where court documents, commentaries, articles, press releases, and a bibliography of books are accessible. The Hague Justice Journal – Journal Judiciaire de La Haye contains articles and commentaries by expert commentators analysing legal issues, as well as an overview of recent decisions.

Projects: Currently, the Hague Justice Portal has two specific projects. The first one is undertaken in close collaboration with the Permanent Court of Arbitration (PCA) for the sake of digitalising a number of the Court’s historic international arbitral awards which were previously unavailable in electronic format. The second one is called the DomCLIC project, which is a pilot for an ever-expanding database of domestic jurisprudence relating to international criminal law from countries all over the world. In April 2014, Colette O'Donovan agreed to lead a new project. The Hague Justice Gender Project will focus on raising awareness of issues and events specifically relating to gender in international law.

The Hague: This part of the website offers insights into the city for residents, tourists, and expatriates. It includes a vacancy list of job opportunities in the city, including legal and justice-related employment and internship positions.

Portal: This section provides information about the Hague Academic Coalition(HAC) to which the Portal pertains. This consortium of institutions that work in the fields of international relations and international law offers their latest publications and research papers.

== Reception by jurists ==
The Portal has already acquired considerable attention from the community of jurists. In addition, research benefits from having historical PCA arbitration awards online, freely-accessible, and in one place. Several scholars so far have used and cited the Portal in their research, one about the David Hicks case, and another about the Hariri Tribunal. Information on notable cases, such as those of Slobodan Milošević, Charles G. Taylor, Thomas Lubanga Dyilo, and Vojislav Šešelj, is also available. For the first time, persons around the world will be able to monitor ICC trials. Cornell Law School's web site, a well-used web site for legal research, now links to the Portal. The International Justice Tribune, another site for International law, also links to the Portal.
