= Chen Lung-chu =

Taiwanese legal scholar (born 1935)

- 陳隆志
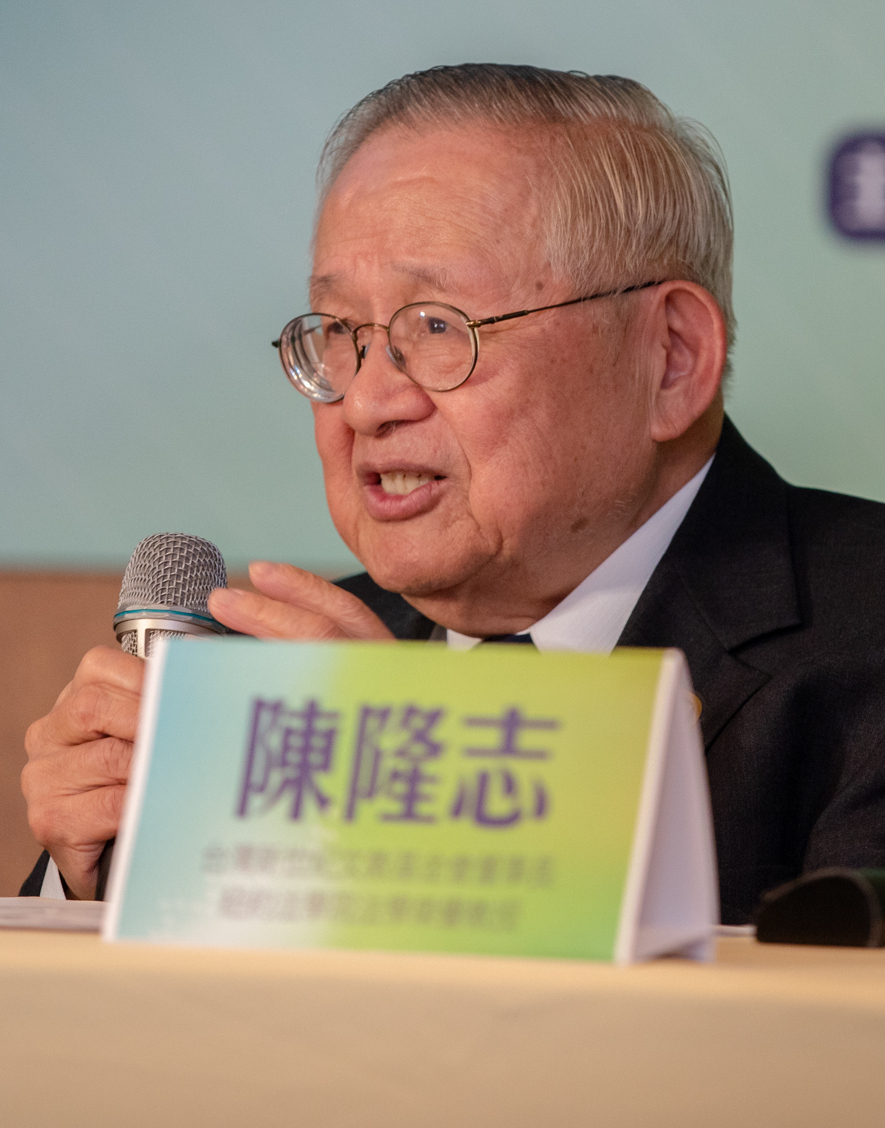
- Chen in 2019
- Born: 30 December 1935 (age 90); Matō, Sobun, Tainan Prefecture, Taiwan, Empire of Japan
- Education: National Taiwan University (LLB); Northwestern University (LLM); Yale University (LLM, JSD)
- Occupations: Legal scholar; law professor; activist

Chen Lung-chu (Chinese: 陳隆志; pinyin: Chén Lóngzhì; born 30 December 1935) is a Taiwanese legal scholar. He is a professor emeritus at New York Law School, the founder of the Taiwan New Century Foundation, and chairman of the Taiwan Society of International Law.

== Early life and education ==
Chen was born on December 30, 1935, in Madou District, Tainan County. His parents were originally from Jiali, Tainan. His father, Chen Shih-tung (陳士東), was an electrician for the Taiwan Power Company.

After graduating as valedictorian from National Tainan First Senior High School, Chen studied law at National Taiwan University (NTU), where he became a student of legal scholar Peng Ming-min. As an undergraduate, he attained the highest score in four national civil service examinations and qualified as a judge and diplomat while still pursuing his law degree. He graduated first in his class from NTU with a Bachelor of Laws (LL.B.) with highest honors in 1958, then completed military service in the Republic of China Army as a reserve officer.

Chen won a Fulbright Fellowship and a Ford Foundation Fellowship to study in the U.S. from 1960 to 1961, then received a Yale Fellowship from 1961 to 1964. He earned a Master of Laws (LL.M.) from the Northwestern University Pritzker School of Law in 1961. He then earned a second LL.M. degree in 1962 and his Doctor of Juridical Science (J.S.D.) in 1964 from Yale Law School. As a doctoral student at Yale, he was mentored by political scientist Harold Lasswell.

== Career ==
After obtaining his doctorate, Chen worked as a research associate at Yale Law School from 1964 to 1977 and as a senior research associate there from 1973 to 1977. He was the editor-in-chief of Human Rights, a law journal of the American Bar Association, from 1978 to 1981 and was a senior lecturer at the International Institute of Human Rights in 1979. He befriended Saudi diplomat Jamil Baroody in 1969.

From 2000 to 2001, Chen was a national policy advisor to President Chen Shui-bian. He was also an advisor to the Office of the President from 2001 to 2006.

Chen is an elected life member of the American Law Institute.

== Personal life ==
Chen is a devout Christian. He was baptized in 1967.

== Awards and honors ==
- Second Class Order of Brilliant Star (awarded on May 13, 2008, at the Presidential Office Building, Taipei)

== Selected publications ==
- Chen, Lung-chu; Reisman, W. M. (1972). "Who Owns Taiwan: A Search for International Title". The Yale Law Journal. 81 (4): 599–671. doi:10.2307/795213. ISSN 0044-0094. JSTOR 795213.
