= Carnegie Foundation (Netherlands) =

Foundation based in The Hague, Netherlands

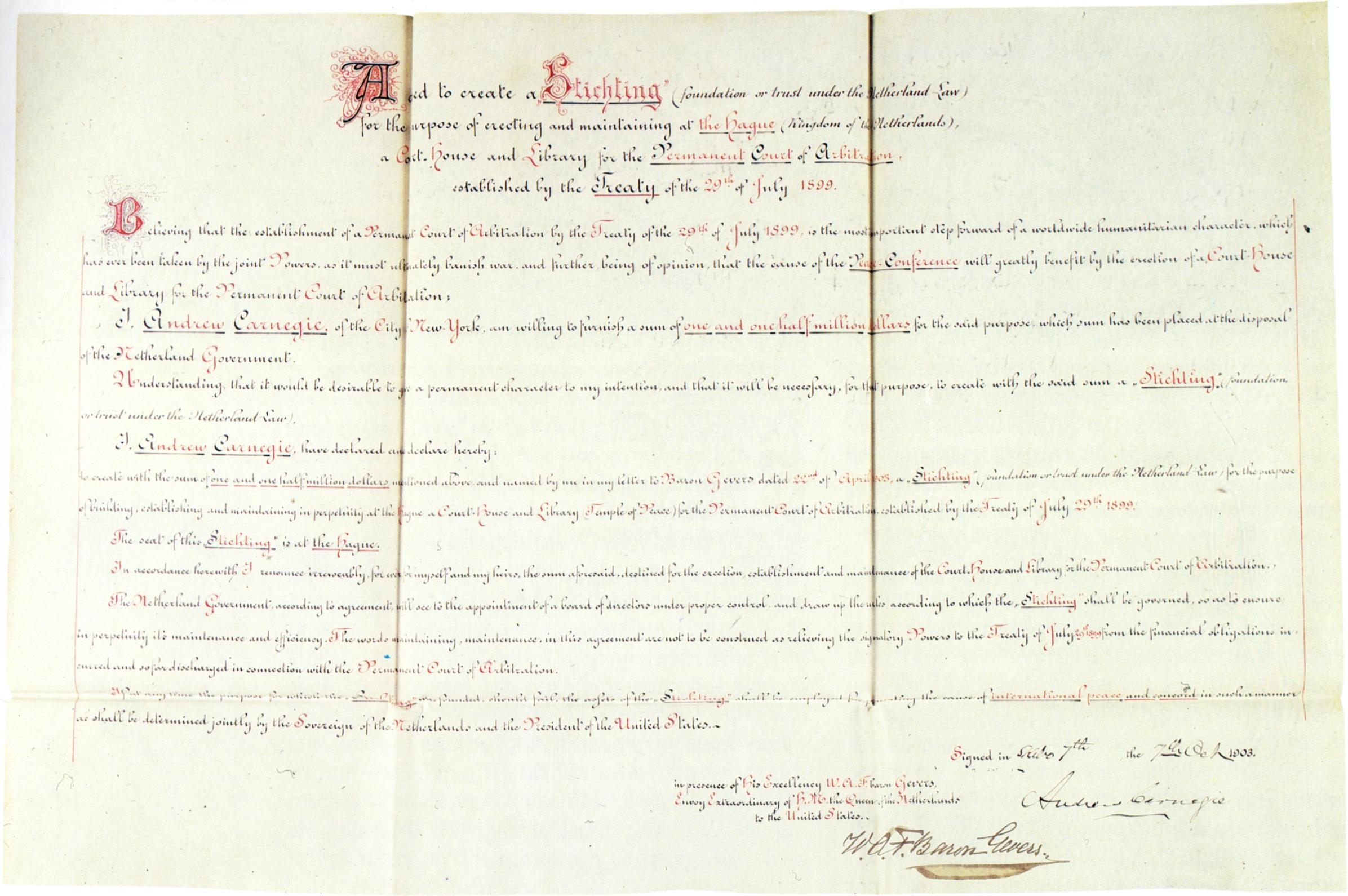
Foundation charter of the Carnegie Foundation.

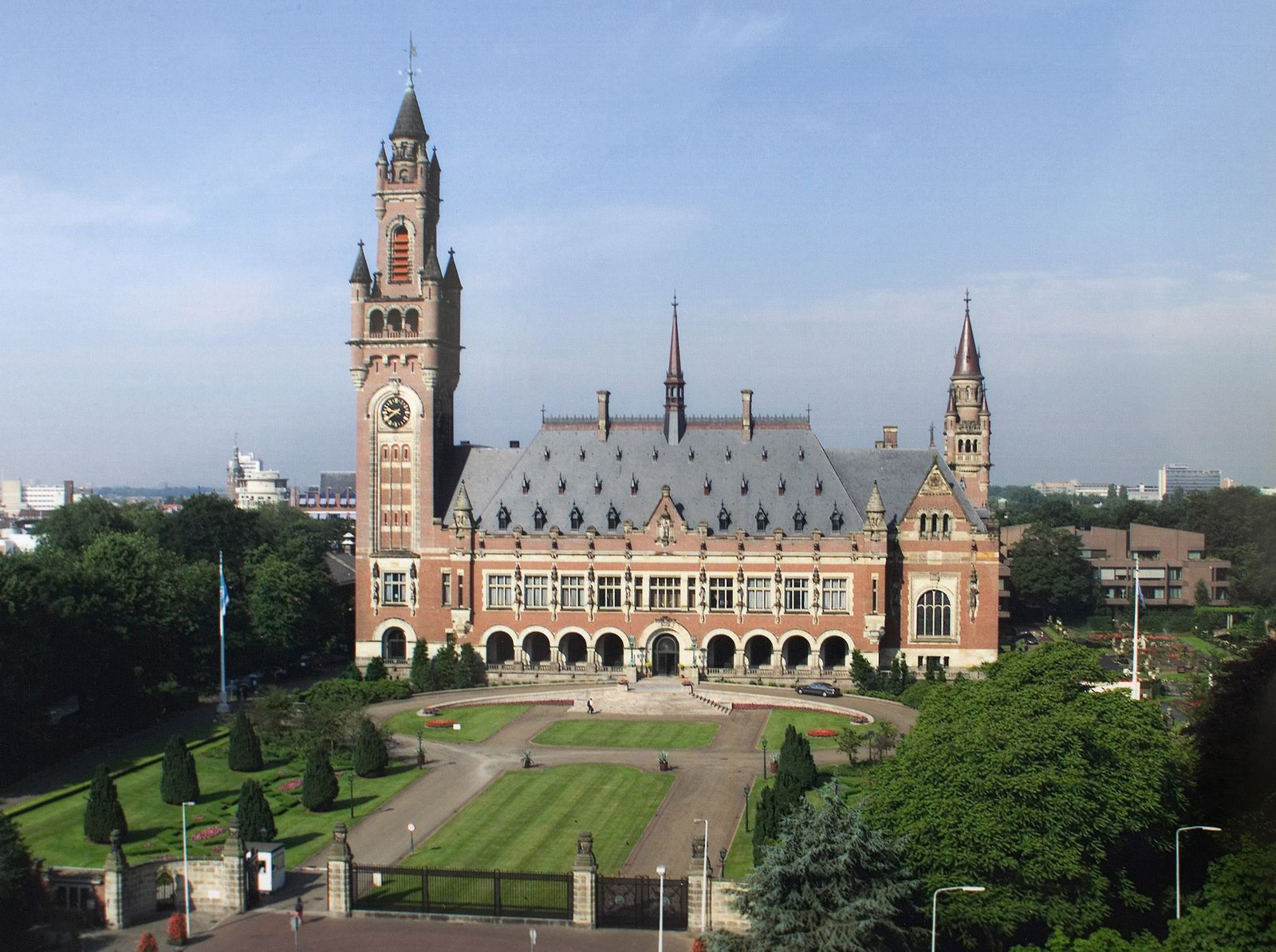
The Peace Palace in The Hague, Netherlands.

The Carnegie Foundation (Dutch: Carnegie Stichting) is an organization based in The Hague, Netherlands. It was founded in 1903 by Andrew Carnegie in order to manage his donation of US$1.5 million, which was used for the construction, management, and maintenance of the Peace Palace. The Peace Palace was built to house the Permanent Court of Arbitration and a library of international law.

The foundation became the legal owner of the Peace Palace because the Permanent Court of Arbitration, which is based there along with its library, could not own the building under Dutch law.

The foundation has five Dutch board members, of whom four are chosen by the Dutch monarch and one by the Supervisory Board of the Permanent Court of Arbitration. The current chairman of the Carnegie Foundation is Bernard Bot.

Since 1931, the foundation has been entrusted with the annual awarding of the Wateler Peace Prize.

The Carnegie Foundation is a member of the Hague Academic Coalition. This is a consortium of institutions in the fields of international relations, international law and international development, based in The Hague. The Carnegie Foundation is one of the founding partners of The Hague Institute for Global Justice, a research institute in The Hague.
