= The Hague Academy of International Law =

School of international law in the Netherlands

- Académie de droit international de La Haye
- Established: 1923
- Location: Peace Palace, The Hague, Netherlands; 52.0866°N 4.2955°E
- Website: hagueacademy.nl

The Hague Academy of International Law (French: Académie de droit international de La Haye) is a center for high-level education in both public and private international law housed in the Peace Palace in The Hague, Netherlands. Courses are taught in English and French and, except for External Programme Courses, are held in the Peace Palace.

The academy is notable for its Summer Courses Programme. The academy's alumni, faculty, and administration have included heads of state; foreign ministers; ambassadors; 12 judges of the International Court of Justice; one former secretary-general of the United Nations, Boutros Boutros-Ghali; and two Nobel Prize recipients.

== History ==
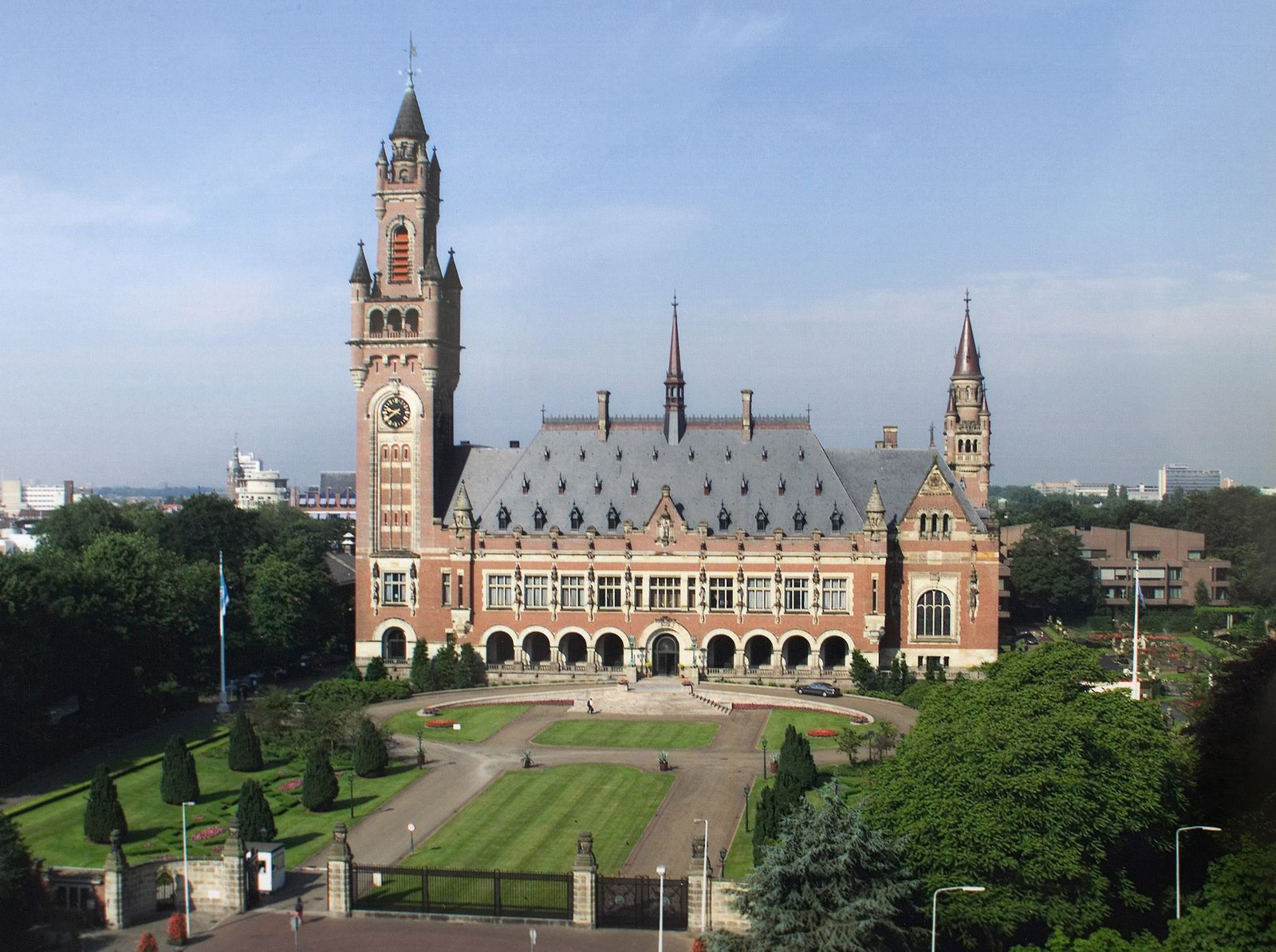
The Peace Palace which houses the Hague Academy of International Law, pictured in March 2006

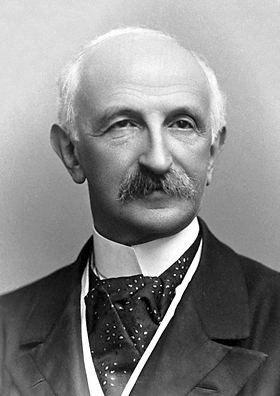
Nobel Peace Prize laureate Tobias Asser (1838–1913)

Since its creation in 1923, the Hague Academy of International Law has occupied premises at the Peace Palace. Next to the Peace Palace building, the academy's facilities include the Academy Hall built for international conferences, the Peace Palace Library, and further administrative accommodations. The new buildings were planned and realized by architects Michael Wilford and Manuel Schupp. Alongside the Hague Academy of International Law, the Peace Palace houses the highest judicial institutions such as the International Court of Justice and the Bureau of the Permanent Court of Arbitration. In the context of the movement for the establishment of peace through law, the idea of creating an Academy of International Law was mooted at the Hague Conference in 1907 (having previously been voiced by the Institut de Droit International as early as 1873). The Dutch government took up the idea, and the International Law Association in turn examined the question.

Dutch lawyer Tobias M. C. Asser proposed a plan that envisaged more or less what the academy was to become, with courses held from July to October. Asser received the Nobel Peace Prize in 1911 and contributed a part of the prize money to the academy; and the Carnegie Endowment for Peace provided a valuable contribution to get it started. The inauguration of the academy was planned for October 1914 but was delayed by the outbreak of World War I in the preceding summer, and preparations could not be resumed until 1921. When the Summer Courses started on 14 July 1923 at the Peace Palace, 353 students originating from 31 countries attended, of whom 35 were women.

The academy is now a centre for research and teaching in public and private international law, with the aim of further scientific and advanced studies of the legal aspects of international relations. The UN General Assembly regularly refers to the “valuable contribution” that the academy "continues to make to the United Nations Program of Assistance in the Teaching, Study, Dissemination and Wider Appreciation of International Law". The academy was awarded the Wateler Peace Prize (1936, 1950), the Félix Houphouët-Boigny Peace Prize (1992), the Order of Rio Branco, Brazil (1999), and the Medal of the Royal Institute of European Studies, Spain (2000). The academy has been nominated for the Nobel Peace Prize 73 times between 1915 and 1974. The academy is part of the Hague Academic Coalition.

== Structure of the academy ==
=== The Curatorium ===
The academy's academic activities and policies are defined by the Curatorium. It consists of members of different nationalities, who are well known in the academic or diplomatic worlds, or practising international lawyers. The president of the Curatorium is a distinguished jurist who generally has extensive experience of international and diplomatic life. Among the most recent presidents have been Roberto Ago, Nicolas Valticos and Boutros Boutros-Ghali and Yves Daudet - who was given the title of honorary president upon his departure.

Diego P. Fernández Arroyo, professor and researcher at Sciences Po in Paris, was elected president of the Curatorium on 24 May 2024.

Yuko Nishitani, professor of Private International Law at Kyoto University, is vice-president of the Curatorium.

Jean-Marc Thouvenin, Doctor of Laws and associate professor of Public Law at Paris Nanterre University took office as the secretary-general of the academy on 1 January 2017.

Members

- Mohamed S. Abdel Wahab, professor at Cairo University and dean of Africa Arbitration Academy
- Katharina Boele-Woelki, professor emerita at the Bucerius Law School, Hamburg; president of the International Academy of Comparative Law
- Laurence Boisson de Chazournes, professor at the University of Geneva
- Hannah L. Buxbaum, professor at the University of California - Davis School of Law
- Giuditta Cordero-Moss, professor at the Department for Private Law of the University of Oslo
- Patrícia Galvão Teles, professor at the Autonomous University of Lisbon and Member of the International Law Commission
- María Teresa Infante Caffi, judge at the International Tribunal for the Law of the Sea
- Bing Bing Jia, professor at Tsinghua University, Beijing
- Maurice Kamto, professor at Yaoundé II University
- Makane Moïse Mbengue, professor at the University of Geneva
- Nilüfer Oral, director of the National University of Singapore Centre for International Law and Member of the International Law Commission
- Nico J. Schrijver, professor emeritus at Leiden University; state councillor at the Netherlands Council of State
- Linos-Alexander Sicilianos, former president of the European Court of Human Rights; dean of the Law Faculty of the University of Athens
- Peter Tomka, judge at the International Court of Justice
- Tullio Treves, professor emeritus at the University of Milan

=== Administrative board ===
The administrative council is in charge of the financial and material aspects of the academy's operations. The administrative board has close ties with the Carnegie Foundation, as the chairman of the Carnegie Foundation, Jan Pieter Hendrik Donner, and Boudeweijn J. van Eenennaam both sit on the administrative board of the academy. The Carnegie Foundation is the owner and operator of the Peace Palace, where the academy is located.

== Programmes ==
=== Summer Courses ===
The Summer Courses of the academy are held in July (Public International Law) and August (Private International Law); each session lasts three weeks. The academy is not a university: it does not have a permanent teaching staff, but its scientific body, the Curatorium, freely calls upon academics, practitioners, diplomats, and other personalities from all over the world whom it considers qualified to give courses, in English or French (with simultaneous interpretation). These courses are given in the form of a series of lectures, on general or special subjects. The courses are then published in the Collected Courses of the Academy of International Law, which now run to more than 360 volumes and are among the most important encyclopaedic publications on private and public international law.

The Summer programme is directed to advanced students and practitioners seeking a deeper understanding of international law, public or private. The summer courses are open to candidates who have completed at least four years of studying at university, including subjects of international law, and who can prove to the Curatorium that they possess a sufficient knowledge of the subject; to candidates holding a 3-year law degree at the opening of the session of the academy. All candidates must master one of the two working languages (French or English). A merit-based scholarship program allows approximately 20% of the students to receive assistance from public and private funding sources. Each year, attendees representing between 80 and 100 nationalities participate.

Winter Courses

The Winter Courses on International Law are a program based on the long-successful Summer Courses of which the first edition took place in January 2019. The courses take place annually during January, with a focus on both public and private international law. The 2021 edition of the Winter Courses was held online due to the COVID-19 pandemic.

=== Centre for Studies and Research in International Law and International Relations ===
The Centre for Research first opened in 1957. For three weeks starting in mid-August, the centre is open to persons undertaking high-level research, allowing them to work under the direction of professors who are highly qualified in the studied subject. The best results of the work are published in the academy's collection. There are between 20 and 24 participants, equally split between the English-speaking and French-speaking section.

Topics:

- 2010: International Migrations
- 2011: Remedies for the Actions of International Organizations
- 2012: Criminal Acts at Sea
- 2013: The Legal Implications of Global Financial Crises

=== External program ===
At the end of the 1960s, the academy established the prestigious "External Program", which is normally held each year, in turn in Africa, Asia, and Latin America, upon the invitation of host governments or international organizations.

The External Program is designed for around 20 participants from the countries in the region, whose travelling expenses are usually financed by the academy and whose accommodation is financed by the government of the host state or organization. In addition, a number of participants come from the host state itself. GNLU in collaboration with the Hague Academy of International Law concluded the 2013 edition.

== Academy diploma ==
The Hague Academy of International Law awards a high-level diploma for students who already have a thorough knowledge of international law and who pass an examination in either public international law or private international law. Few diplomas are awarded each year, as the examination is highly selective.

== Doctoral scholarships ==
The academy awards four doctoral scholarships each year. The beneficiaries stay for two months (July and August) in The Hague to pursue their doctoral researches. They can access the Peace Palace Library and attend the Summer Courses. The candidates should come from a developing country and live there, and their doctoral thesis should be in the process of completion.

== Publications ==
Since 1923, all courses given at the academy have been published in the language in which they were delivered in the Collected Courses of the Hague Academy of International Law (in French: Recueil des cours de l'Académie de droit international de La Haye). All the volumes of the Collected Courses which have been published since 1923 are available, since the very first volume (green binder). Some courses are also available in electronic format and as paperback books. The series The Hague Academy of International Law Monographs proposes revised and updated versions of certain courses given during the Summer programme. The scientific works of the Centre have been published since its 1985 session in a publication in which the directors of studies report on the state of research of the centre under their direction. When the work of the centre has been of particular interest and originality, the reports of the directors of studies, together with the articles by the researchers, form the subject of a collection published in the series The Law Books of the Academy. The academy organizes colloquia whose works are published in the Law Books of the Academy series.

== Colloquia ==
Within the framework of a small working group, the colloquia bring together specialists on a chosen subject from various countries of the world. The main objective of the colloquia—other than that of bringing together academics, diplomats and practitioners who have a common interest and knowledge of a specific theme—is to gather knowledge in that subject into a publication of high academic standard in the Legal Publications of the Academy series. A wide variety of topics have been covered:

- 1968 – International Trade Agreements (1969)
- 1971 – Legal Aspects of Economic Integration (1972)
- 1973 – The Protection of the Environment and International Law (1975)
- 1978 – The Right to Health as a Human Right
- 1979 – The Right to Development at the International Level (1980)
- 1980 – The New International Economic Order. Commercial, Technological and Cultural Aspects (1981)
- 1981 – The Management of Humanity's Resources : The Law of the Sea (1982)
- 1982 – The Settlement of Disputes on the New Natural Resources (1983)
- 1983 – The Future of International Law in a Multicultural World (1984)
- 1984 – The Future of the International Law of the Environment (1985)
- 1985 – The Adaptation of Structures and Methods at the United Nations (1986)
- 1990 – The Peaceful Settlement of International Disputes in Europe: Future Prospects (1991)
- 1992 – The Development of the Role of the Security Council (1993)
- 1994 – The Convention on the Prohibition and Elimination of Chemicals Weapons:A Breakthrough in Multilateral Disarmament (1995)
- 2007 – Topicality of the 1907 Hague Conference, the second Peace Conference (2008)

== Bibliography ==
- René-Jean Dupuy: Académie de droit international de La Haye: Livre jubilaire (1923–1973). A.W. Sijthoff, Leiden 1973.
- Robert Kolb: Les cours généraux de droit international public de l'Académie de La Haye. Bruylant, Bruxelles, 2003.

== See also ==
- List of The Hague Academy of International Law people
- European Institute for International Law and International Relations
