= Lauterpacht =

Lauterpacht is a surname. Notable people with the surname include:

- Hersch Lauterpacht (1897–1960), British international lawyer, human rights activist, and judge at the International Court of Justice
- Elihu Lauterpacht (1928–2017), British academic and lawyer, son of Hersch

== See also ==
- Lauterpacht Centre for International Law (LCIL), the Faculty of Law, Cambridge, England
