= List of honorary fellows of Queens' College, Cambridge =

This is a list of Honorary Fellows of Queens' College, Cambridge.

- Khalid Abdalla
- Philip Allen, Baron Allen of Abbeydale
- Sir Arthur Armitage
- Andrew Bailey
- Sir Harold Bailey
- Sir John Banham
- Henry Bovey
- Sir Derek Bowett
- Sir Stephen Brown
- Sir Reader Bullard
- Henry Chadwick
- Sir John Chisholm
- Sir Robert Chote
- Frederic Chase
- Kelly Chibale
- Sir Humphrey Cripps
- Sir Andrew Crockett
- Edward Cullinan
- Kenneth Dadzie
- Sir Richard Dearlove
- Joost de Blank
- John Eatwell, Baron Eatwell
- Abba Eban
- Mohamed A. El-Erian
- Charles Falconer, Baron Falconer of Thoroton
- Michael Foale
- Sir Stephen Fry
- Sir Frederick Gentle
- Mike Gibson
- M. S. Gill
- Paul Ginsborg
- Paul Greengrass
- Thomas Hannay
- Sir Martin Harris
- Sir Demis Hassabis
- Robert Haszeldine
- Richard Hickox
- Tom Holland
- Mairi Hurrell
- Awn Al-Khasawneh
- Amma Kyei-Mensah
- Sir David Latham
- Herbert Loewe
- Emily Maitlis
- Peter Mathias
- James Maynard
- Sir Robin Millar
- Dambisa Moyo, Baroness Moyo
- Sir Guy Newey
- Stephen Oakley
- Jane Osbourn
- Ronald Oxburgh, Baron Oxburgh
- Sir Thomas Padmore
- Dame Alison Peacock
- Sir William Peel
- John Polkinghorne
- Sir Samuel Provis
- Osborne Reynolds
- Herbert Edward Ryle
- Mark Santer
- Professor Naomi Segal
- Bernardo Sepulveda Amor
- Dr Yoshiyasu Shirai
- Roderick Smith
- Sidney Smith
- Edward James Stone
- Sir Morris Sugden
- Graham Swift
- Hugh Thomas, Baron Thomas of Swynnerton
- Sir Shenton Thomas
- Robert John Tillyard
- Charles Tomlinson
- Sir David Walker
- Dr Pippa Wells
- Nicholas Wills
- Bryony Worthington, Baroness Worthington
