= Sovereign state =

State having the highest authority over a territory

A sovereign state is a state that has sovereignty, that is, the highest authority over a territory. It is commonly understood that a sovereign state is independent. When referring to a specific polity, the term "country" may also refer to a constituent country, or a dependent territory.

A sovereign state is required to have a permanent population, defined territory, a government not under the control of another, and the capacity to interact with other sovereign states. In actual practice, recognition or non-recognition by other states plays an important role in determining the status of a country. Unrecognized states often have difficulty engaging in diplomatic relations with other sovereign states.

== History ==
Since the end of the 19th century, almost the entire globe has been divided into sections (countries) with more or less defined borders assigned to different states. Previously, quite large plots of land were either unclaimed or deserted, or inhabited by nomadic peoples that were not organized into states. In medieval Europe a ruler's dominion was not linked to specific territorial boundaries, but was assessed in terms of the quality of land or other possessions. The roots of the modern perception of borders go back to the Westphalian international system. However, even in modern states, there are large remote areas, such as the Amazon's tropical forests, that are either uninhabited or inhabited exclusively or mainly by indigenous people (and some of them are still not in constant contact). Additionally, there are states where de facto control is contested or where it is not exercised over their whole area.

Currently, the international community includes more than 200 sovereign states, most of which are represented in the United Nations. These states exist in a system of international relations, where each state takes into account the policies of other states by making its own calculations. From this point of view, States are integrated into the international system of special internal and external security and legitimization of the dilemma. Recently, the concept of the international community has been formed to refer to a group of States that have established rules, procedures and institutions for the implementation of relations. Thus, the foundation for international law, diplomacy between officially recognized sovereign states, their organizations and formal regimes has been laid.

== Westphalian sovereignty ==
Westphalian sovereignty is the concept of nation-state sovereignty based on territoriality and the absence of a role for external agents in domestic structures. It is an international system of states and organizations that began with the Peace of Westphalia in 1648.

Sovereignty is a term that is frequently misused. Up until the 19th century, the radicalised concept of a "standard of civilization" was routinely deployed to determine that certain people in the world were "uncivilized", and lacking organised societies. That position was reflected and constituted in the notion that their "sovereignty" was either completely lacking or at least of an inferior character when compared to that of the "civilized" people". Lassa Oppenheim said, "There exists perhaps no conception the meaning of which is more controversial than that of sovereignty. It is an indisputable fact that this conception, from the moment when it was introduced into political science until the present day, has never had a meaning, which was universally agreed upon." In the opinion of H. V. Evatt of the High Court of Australia, "sovereignty is neither a question of fact, nor a question of law, but a question that does not arise at all".

Sovereignty has taken on a different meaning with the development of the principle of self-determination and the prohibition against the threat or use of force as jus cogens norms of modern international law. The United Nations Charter, the Draft Declaration on Rights and Duties of States, and the charters of regional international organizations express the view that all states are juridically equal and enjoy the same rights and duties based upon the mere fact of their existence as persons under international law. The right of nations to determine their own political status and exercise permanent sovereignty within the limits of their territorial jurisdictions is widely recognized.

In political science, sovereignty is usually defined as the most essential attribute of the state in the form of its complete self-sufficiency in the frames of a certain territory, that is its supremacy in the domestic policy and independence in the foreign one.

Named after the 1648 Treaty of Westphalia, the Westphalian System of state sovereignty, according to Bryan Turner, "made a more or less clear separation between religion and state, and recognized the right of princes "to confessionalize" the state, that is, to determine the religious affiliation of their kingdoms on the pragmatic principle of cuius regio eius religio [whose realm, his religion]."

Before 1900, sovereign states enjoyed absolute immunity from the judicial process, derived from the concepts of sovereignty and the Westphalian equality of states. First articulated by Jean Bodin, the powers of the state are considered to be suprema potestas within territorial boundaries. Based on this, the jurisprudence has developed along the lines of affording immunity from prosecution to foreign states in domestic courts. In The Schooner Exchange v. M'Faddon, Chief Justice John Marshall of the United States Supreme Court wrote that the "perfect equality and absolute independence of sovereigns" has created a class of cases where "every sovereign is understood to waive the exercise of a part of that complete exclusive territorial jurisdiction, which has been stated to be the attribute of every nation".

Absolute sovereign immunity is no longer as widely accepted as it has been in the past, and some countries, including Australia, Canada, Singapore, South Africa, Pakistan, and the United States, have introduced restrictive immunity by statute, which explicitly limits jurisdictional immunity to public acts, but not private or commercial ones, though there is no precise definition by which public acts can easily be distinguished from private ones.

== Recognition ==
There are debates over whether states can exist as a fact independent of recognition or whether recognition is one of the facts necessary to bring states into being. A No definition is binding on all the members of the community of nations on the criteria for statehood. Some argue that the criteria are mainly political, not legal. L.C. Green cited the recognition of the unborn Polish and Czechoslovak states in World War I and explained that "since recognition of statehood is a matter of discretion, it is open to any existing State to accept as a state any entity it wishes, regardless of the existence of territory or of an established government." International lawyer Hersch Lauterpacht states that recognition is not merely a formality but an active interpretation in support of any facts. Once made however it cannot be arbitrarily revoked on account of another state's own discretion or internal politics.

=== Constitutive theory ===
The constitutive theory of statehood defines a state as a person of international law if, and only if, it is recognised as sovereign by at least one other state. This theory of recognition was developed in the 19th century. Under it, a state was sovereign if another sovereign state recognised it as such. Because of this, new states could not immediately become part of the international community or be bound by international law, and recognised nations did not have to respect international law in their dealings with them. In 1815, at the Congress of Vienna, the Final Act recognised only 39 sovereign states in the European diplomatic system, and as a result, it was firmly established that in the future new states would have to be recognised by other states, and that meant in practice recognition by one or more of the great powers.

One of the major criticisms of this law is the confusion caused when some states recognise a new entity, but other states do not. Hersch Lauterpacht, one of the theory's main proponents, suggested that a state must grant recognition as a possible solution. However, a state may use any criteria when judging if they should give recognition and they have no obligation to use such criteria. Many states may only recognise another state if it is to their advantage.

In 1912, L. F. L. Oppenheim said the following, regarding constitutive theory:

International Law does not say that a State is not in existence as long as it is not recognised, but it takes no notice of it before its recognition. Through recognition only and exclusively a State becomes an International Person and a subject of International Law.

Recognition or non-recognition by other states can override declarative theory criteria in cases such as Kosovo and Somaliland.

=== Declarative theory ===
By contrast, the declarative theory of statehood defines a state as a person in international law if it meets the following criteria: 1) a defined territory; 2) a permanent population; 3) a government and 4) a capacity to enter into relations with other states. According to declarative theory, an entity's statehood is independent of its recognition by other states, as long as the sovereignty was not gained by military force. The declarative model was expressed in the 1933 Montevideo Convention.

A "territory" in the international law context consists of land territory, internal waters, territorial sea, and air space above the territory. There is no requirement on strictly delimited borders or minimum size of the land, but artificial installations and uninhabitable territories cannot be considered territories sufficient for statehood. The term "permanent population" defines the community that has the intention to inhabit the territory permanently and is capable of supporting the superstructure of the State, though there is no requirement for a minimum population. The government must be capable of exercising effective control over a territory and population (the requirement known in legal theory as the "effective control test") and guarantee the protection of basic human rights by legal methods and policies. The "capacity to enter into relations with other states" reflects the entity's degree of independence.

Article 3 of the Montevideo Convention declares that political statehood is independent of recognition by other states, and the state is not prohibited from defending itself.

A similar opinion about "the conditions on which an entity constitutes a state" is expressed by the European Economic Community Opinions of the Badinter Arbitration Committee, which found that a state was defined by having a territory, a population, government, and capacity to enter into relations with other states.

The Montevideo Convention criteria do not automatically create a state because additional requirements must be met. While they play an important role, they do not determine the status of a country in all cases, such as Kosovo, Rhodesia, and Somaliland.

In practice, international relations take into account the effect of recognition and non-recognition. It is the act of recognition that affirms whether a country meets the requirements for statehood and is now subject to international law in the same way that other sovereign states are.

=== State recognition ===
State practice relating to the recognition of states typically falls somewhere between the declaratory and constitutive approaches. International law does not require a state to recognise other states. Recognition is often withheld when a new state is seen as illegitimate or has come about in breach of international law. Almost universal non-recognition by the international community of Rhodesia and Northern Cyprus are good examples of this, the former only having been recognized by South Africa, and the latter only recognized by Turkey. In the case of Rhodesia, recognition was widely withheld when the white minority seized power and attempted to form a state along the lines of Apartheid South Africa, a move that the United Nations Security Council described as the creation of an "illegal racist minority régime".

In the case of Northern Cyprus, recognition was withheld from a state, the Turkish Republic of Northern Cyprus (TNRC), created in Northern Cyprus. International law contains no prohibition on declarations of independence, and the recognition of a country is a political issue. On 2 July 2013, the European Court of Human Rights (ECtHR) decided that "notwithstanding the lack of international recognition of the regime in the northern area, a de facto recognition of its acts may be rendered necessary for practical purposes. Thus the adoption by the authorities of the "TRNC" of civil, administrative or criminal law measures, and their application or enforcement within that territory, may be regarded as having a legal basis in domestic law for the purposes of the Convention". On 9 October 2014, the US's Federal Court stated that "the TRNC purportedly operates as a democratic republic with a president, prime minister, legislature and judiciary". On 2 September 2015, ECtHR decided that "...the court system set up in the "TRNC" was to be considered to have been "established by law" with reference to the "constitutional and legal basis" on which it operated, and it has not accepted the allegation that the "TRNC" courts as a whole lacked independence and/or impartiality". On 3 February 2017, the United Kingdom's High Court stated "There was no duty in the United Kingdom law upon the Government to refrain from recognizing Northern Cyprus. The United Nations itself works with Northern Cyprus law enforcement agencies and facilitates co-operation between the two parts of the island". and revealed that the co-operation between the United Kingdom police and law agencies in Northern Cyprus is legal. Turkish Cypriots gained "observer status" in the Parliamentary Assembly of the Council of Europe (PACE), and their representatives are elected in the Assembly of Northern Cyprus. As a country, Northern Cyprus became an observer member in various international organizations (the Organisation of Islamic Cooperation (OIC), the Economic Cooperation Organization (ECO), the Organization of Turkic States (OTS), the Parliamentary Assembly of Turkic States (TURKPA), etc.).

=== De facto and de jure states ===
De facto map of control of the world, May 2019

Most sovereign states are both de jure and de facto (i.e., they exist both according to law and in practice). However, states which are only de jure are sometimes recognised as being the legitimate government of a territory over which they have no actual control. For example, during the Second World War, governments-in-exile of several states continued to enjoy diplomatic relations with the Allies, notwithstanding that their countries were under occupation by Axis powers. Other entities may have de facto control over a territory but lack international recognition; these may be considered by the international community to be only de facto states. They are considered de jure states only according to their own law and by states that recognise them. For example, Somaliland is commonly considered to be such a state.

Outlining the concept of a de facto state for EurasiaNet in early 2024, Laurence Broers wrote:

De facto states can be understood as a product of the very system that excludes the possibility of their existence: the post-Second World War and post-colonial system of sovereign and equal states covering every centimeter of the globe.

The hegemony of this system, at least until recent years, is what created the possibility of a de facto state as an anomaly existing outside of it - or in Alexander Iskandaryan's memorable phrase, as "temporary technical errors within the system of international law." The Soviet and Yugoslav collapses resulted in the emergence of numerous such entities, several of which, including Abkhazia, Transdniester, South Ossetia and the NKR, survived in the margins of international relations for decades despite non-recognition.

=== Semi-sovereign states ===
Sovereignty is most commonly conceptualised as something categorical, which is either present or absent, and the coherence of any intermediate position in that binary has been questioned, especially in the context of international law. In spite of this, some authors admit the concept of a semi-sovereign state, a state which is officially acknowledged as sovereign but whose theoretical sovereignty is significantly impaired in practice, such as by being de facto subjected to a more powerful neighbour; Belarus, in its relationship with Russia, has been proposed as a contemporary example of a semi-sovereign state. In a somewhat different sense, the term semi-sovereign was famously applied to West Germany by political scientist Peter Katzenstein in his 1987 book Policy and Politics in West Germany: The Growth of a Semi-sovereign State, due to having a political system in which the sovereignty of the state was subject to limitations both internal (West Germany's federal system and the role of civil society) and external (membership in the European Community and reliance on its alliance with the United States and NATO for its national security).

== Relationship between state and government ==
Although the terms "state" and "government" are often used interchangeably, international law distinguishes between a non-physical state and its government; and in fact, the concept of "government-in-exile" is predicated upon that distinction. States are non-physical juridical entities, not organisations of any kind. However, ordinarily, only the government of a state can obligate or bind the state, for example by treaty.

== State extinction ==
Generally speaking, states are durable entities, though they can become extinguished, either through voluntary means or outside forces, such as military conquest. Violent state abolition has virtually ceased since the end of World War II. Because states are non-physical juridical entities, Robert Heath Robinson from the University of Buffalo argues that their extinction cannot be due to physical force alone.

== Ontological status of the state ==
The ontological status of the state has been a subject of debate, especially, whether or not the state, being an object that no one can see, taste, touch, or otherwise detect, actually exists.

=== The state as "quasi-abstract" ===
It has been argued that one potential reason why the existence of states has been controversial is that states do not have a place in the traditional Platonist duality of the concrete and the abstract. Characteristically, concrete objects are those that have a position in time and space, which states do not have (though their territories have a spatial position, states are distinct from their territories), and abstract objects have a position in neither time nor space, which does not fit the supposed characteristics of states either, since states do have a temporal position (they can be created at certain times and then become extinct at a future time). Therefore, it has been argued that states belong to a third category, the quasi-abstract, that has recently begun to garner philosophical attention, especially in the area of Documentality, an ontological theory that seeks to understand the role of documents in understanding all of social reality. Quasi-abstract objects, such as states, can be brought into being through document acts, and can also be used to manipulate them, such as by binding them by treaty or surrendering them as the result of a war.

Scholars in international relations can be broken up into two different practices, realists and pluralists, of what they believe the ontological state of the state is. Realists believe that the world is one of only states and interstate relations and the identity of the state is defined before any international relations with other states. On the other hand, pluralists believe that the state is not the only actor in international relations and interactions between states and the state is competing against many other actors.

=== The state as "spiritual entity" ===
Another theory of the ontology of the state is that the state is a spiritual, or "mystical entity" with its own being, distinct from the members of the state. The German Idealist philosopher Georg Hegel (1770–1831) was perhaps the greatest proponent of this theory. The Hegelian definition of the state is "the Divine Idea as it exists on Earth".

== Trends in the number of states ==
Since the end of World War II, the number of sovereign states in the international system has surged. Some research suggests that the existence of international and regional organisations, the greater availability of economic aid, and greater acceptance of the norm of self-determination have increased the desire of political units to secede and can be credited for the increase in the number of states in the international system. Harvard economist Alberto Alesina and Tufts economist Enrico Spolaore argue in their book, Size of Nations, that the increase in the number of states can partly be credited to a more peaceful world, greater free trade and international economic integration, democratisation, and the presence of international organisations that co-ordinate economic and political policies.

== See also ==
- List of sovereign states
- Associated state
- Dependent territory
- Exclusive mandate
- Failed state
- Federated state
- List of former sovereign states
- List of sovereign states (by formation date)
- List of sovereign states and dependent territories by continent
- List of states with limited recognition
- List of historical unrecognized states
- Monetary sovereignty
- Nation-building
- Non-Aligned Movement
- Rule according to higher law
- State-building
- Stateless society
- Unitary state
- Quasi-state
- Princely state
- Sovereign Military Order of Malta, a rare example of a contemporary sovereign, non-state entity
- Vienna Convention on Diplomatic Relations
