= Standard of civilisation =

International law

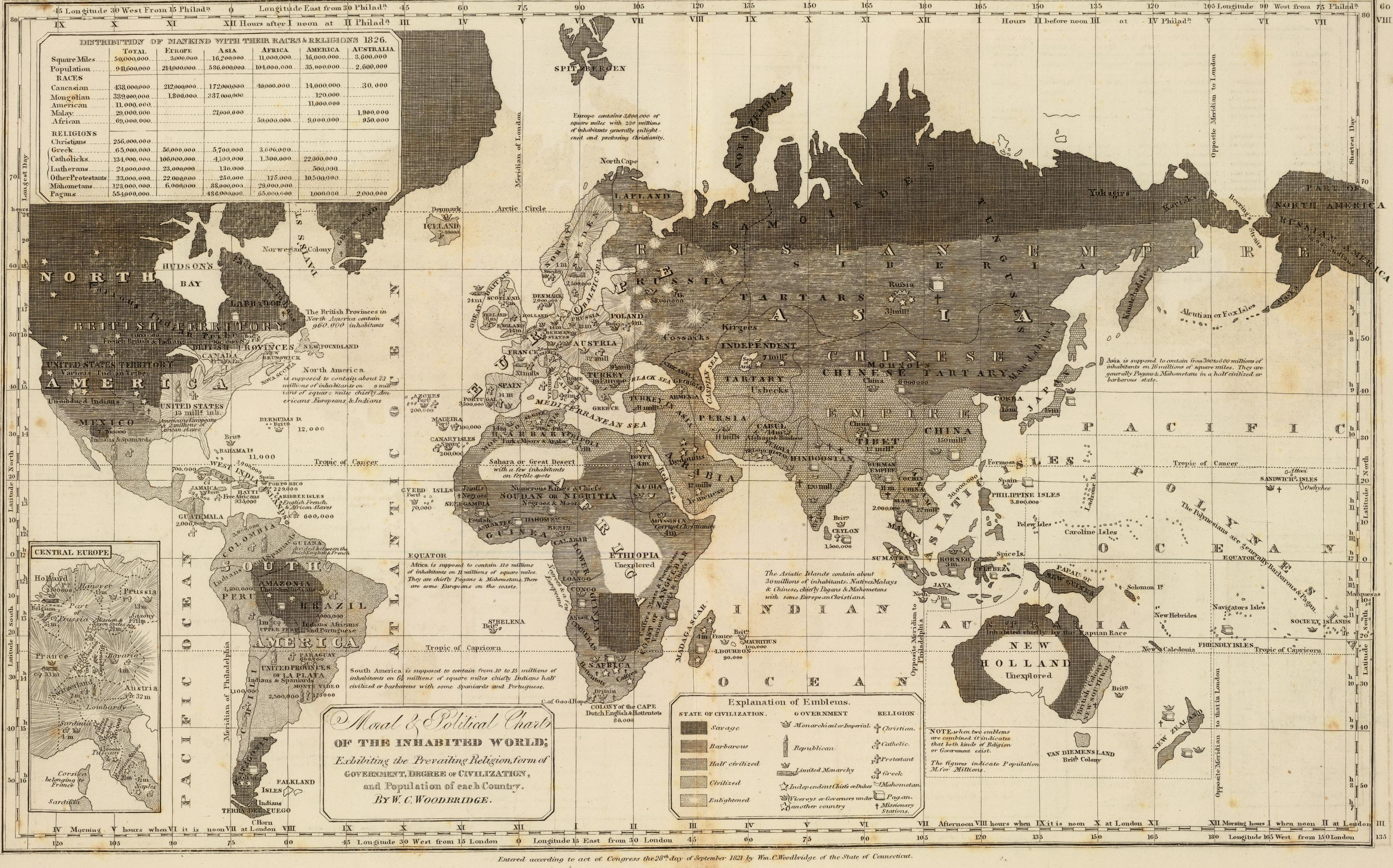
1837 world map by William C. Woodbridge measuring levels of civilisation and dividing the world into savage, barbarous, half civilised, civilised, and enlightened nations.

The standard of civilisation was a principle of international law during the European colonial period that set the criterion for a region to be fully recognised and respected as sovereign. The standard of civilisation was used by European powers following the Age of Discovery when they traded with, exploited and colonised the lands outside Europe. Countries which had non-European civilisations would be considered semi-civilised while primitive areas would be considered uncivilised. The laws of such areas would not be respected and their people, property and territory might be seized, conquered or colonised. International lawyers often used the principle to justify the rights of European colonial empires to colonise and control non-European societies.

== History ==
=== European colonial thought ===
Although the concept of civilisation historically lacked a precise, singular definition, Lucien Febvre noted that during the eighteenth century, it had a meaning of "rather at sea between politesse, police, and civilité." Following the French Revolution, the idea of civilisation gained prominence in France and subsequently in Britain. It encompassed both a continuous process and an attained condition. The latter was considered a source of considerable national pride, emphasising superiority in economic, technological, and sociopolitical domains, as well as intellectual, spiritual, and artistic accomplishments, functioning as "a general counter-concept to another stage of society, barbarism".

During the European colonial period, a widespread division of the world into savage, barbarian and civilised peoples prevailed. According to Montesquieu, savage peoples "are small scattered nations that, for certain, particular reason, cannot unite" and were usually hunting peoples whereas barbarians "are ordinarily small nations that can unite" and were typically pastoral peoples. Most 19th century international lawyers believed that the Westernised semi-civilised and uncivilised nations could gradually become civilised.

According to 19th century jurist James Lorimer, "humanity, in its present condition, divides itself into three concentric zones or spheres—that of civilised humanity, that of barbarous humanity, and that of savage humanity," adding that "savages are incapable of municipal organisation beyond its most rudimentary stages." Lorimer thus held that the Barbary states of North Africa were never recognised by European nations, even justifying the French conquest of Algeria in 1830 as permissible within international law. He further stated that "To talk of the recognition of Mahometan States [...] is to talk nonsense" as a state seeking recognition must possess the will and power "to reciprocate the recognition which it demands".

19th century international lawyers often included the Ottoman Empire, China, Japan, and Siam as examples of semi-civilised nations. Lassa Oppenheim described them as "for some parts within the circle of the Family of Nations," though "for other parts outside." Certain legal scholars acknowledged that "it is difficult to define the exact amount" of civilisation necessary to join the so-called civilised Family of Nations. Scholars came to recognise that speaking of civilisation largely functioned as "an elusive cultural marker than achievable legal standard." Japanese legal scholar Tsurataro Senga noted that when Europeans speak of civilisation or civilised states, they are largely doing so from their own subjective worldviews. Orientalism played a significant role in reinforcing what was deemed civilised or not.

=== Decline ===
At the 1933 Montevideo Convention, the nations of Latin America did not include the standard of civilisation in their criteria for recognition as a state. They had fought to secure their independence from European empires and so naturally did not acknowledge European superiority. This established statehood based on objective criteria – permanent population, defined territory, functioning government and capacity to enter relations with other states – rather than cultural civilisation.

Throughout the run-up to World War II, various legal experts deemed the principle of the standard of civilisation to be anachronistic due to the increasing number of non-European countries. For instance, Georg Schwarzenberger noted that "The standard of civilisation has vanished, and States are supposed to be under a legal duty to recognise even non-civilised States and their governments." The principle was severely undermined during World War II due to the widespread violations of international law, war crimes and use of nuclear weapons by members of the supposedly civilised world.

=== Present-day ===
In the modern era, some regions may still be considered too uncivilised to be respected, being characterised as failed states, rogue states or pariahs.

== See also ==
- Civilizing mission
- Eurocentrism
- Eugenics
- Social Darwinism
- Manifest destiny
- The White Man's Burden
