= Arnold McNair, 1st Baron McNair =

The Right Honourable The Lord McNair CBE QC FBA

1st President of the European Court of Human Rights
- In office 21 January 1959 – 3 May 1965
- Preceded by: Position established
- Succeeded by: René Cassin

Judge of the European Court of Human Rights
- In office 21 January 1959 – 3 May 1966
- Preceded by: Position established
- Succeeded by: Sir Humphrey Waldock

3rd President of the International Court of Justice
- In office 1952–1955
- Vice President: José Gustavo Guerrero
- Preceded by: Jules Basdevant
- Succeeded by: Green Hackworth

Judge of the International Court of Justice
- In office 1946–1955
- Preceded by: Position established
- Succeeded by: Sir Hersch Lauterpacht

Personal details
- Born: Arnold Duncan McNair; 4 March 1885 Highbury Fields, London, England, UK
- Died: 22 May 1975 (aged 90)
- Spouse: Marjorie Bailhache (m. 1912–1971; her death)
- Children: 4
- Education: Aldenham School
- Alma mater: Gonville and Caius College, Cambridge

Arnold Duncan McNair, 1st Baron McNair CBE QC FBA (4 March 1885 – 22 May 1975) was a British jurist and judge of the International Court of Justice and later the first president of the European Court of Human Rights.

== Early life and education ==
McNair was born in Highbury Fields, London. The eldest son of John McNair and Jeannie Ballantyne; his mother was a teacher and his father a member of Lloyd's. McNair was educated at Aldenham School. He left school at 17 to join his sick uncle who was a solicitor; he took his solicitor exams and qualified as a solicitor in 1906. After four years, his uncle's health improved and McNair applied to the University of Cambridge. He was accepted and won a classical scholarship for Gonville and Caius College, Cambridge; he took the law tripos in 1907 and 1908. While at Cambridge, he developed a close relationship with W. W. Buckland. He achieved a double first in both parts of the law tripos. From Cambridge, he took an LLB in 1909, an LLM in 1913, an MA in 1919 and an LLD in 1925. From 1907 to 1908 he was Secretary of Cambridge University Liberal Club, and in 1909 he was President of the Cambridge Union.

== Career ==
McNair moved to London to practise as a solicitor. However, Buckland went to London to offer McNair a lectureship and fellowship at Caius College in 1912, which was accepted. He later became senior tutor. During the First World War, he worked under the coal controller, serving as secretary to the Sankey Commission in 1919.

In 1917, he was called to the bar at Gray's Inn. He was reader in international law at the University of London from 1926 to 1927. He was appointed Tagore Professor at the University of Calcutta in 1931. In 1935 he was appointed Whewell Professor of International Law at Cambridge. However, he left the chair in 1937 to become Vice-Chancellor of Liverpool University where he remained until 1945. when he returned to Cambridge to take up the position of professor of comparative law. He was offered the position of master of Caius, but declined it in favour of joining the International Court of Justice.

His interest was in the common law and he lectured on contract at Cambridge, though he was most notable as an international law expert. R. Y. Jennings said McNair was of the opinion that international lawyers must first become experts in private law in order to ensure legal actions are founded in "hard law" rather than speculation.

=== International court appointments ===
McNair was elected a judge of the International Court of Justice in The Hague in 1945, a post he held until 1955; he was also president of the Court from 1952 to 1955. He later served as the first President of the European Court of Human Rights at Strasbourg from 1959 to 1965.

== Personal life ==
Lord McNair married Marjorie Bailhache (1887–1971), a social worker and daughter of Sir Clement Bailhache, in 1912. They had one son and three daughters. McNair's wife died in 1971 and he in 1975, aged 90. He was succeeded in the barony by his son, Clement John McNair.

== Honours ==
McNair was created a CBE in 1918 and knighted and made a King's Counsel in 1943. In 1955 he was raised to the peerage as Baron McNair, of Gleniffer in the County of Renfrew. He received an honorary DCL from Oxford and LLD from the University of Glasgow, University of Liverpool and University of Birmingham. He received an honorary DLitt from the University of Reading.

== Notes ==
Peerage of the United Kingdom
New creation	Baron McNair; 1955–1975	Succeeded by Clement John McNair
