= Alex Pearce =

Alex Pearce may refer to:

- Alex Pearce (Australian footballer) (born 1995), Australian rules footballer
- Alex Pearce (footballer, born 1988), association football player

== See also ==
- Alec Pearce (1910–1982), English cricketer
- Alexander Pearce (1790–1824), Irish convict transported to Van Diemen's Land
- Alec Pierce (born 2000), American football player
- Alexander Pierce, fictional character in the Marvel universe
- Alexander Pearce Higgins (1865–1935), British international law scholar
