= Cambridge International Law Journal =

- Discipline: British law, comparative law, international law
- Language: English

Publication details
- Former names: Cambridge Journal of International and Comparative Law
- History: 2011–present
- Frequency: Quarterly
- Open access: Yes
- License: Creative Commons Attribution 3.0 License

Standard abbreviations
- ISO 4: Camb. Int. Law J.

Links
- Journal homepage

The Cambridge International Law Journal (formerly Cambridge Journal of International and Comparative Law) is an open access peer-reviewed law journal, published under a Creative Commons Attribution 3.0 License.

The journal was launched on 25 October 2011 at the Lauterpacht Centre for International Law by its inaugural editors-in-chief and James Crawford. The journal is run and edited by students at the University of Cambridge but receives assistance from an Academic Review Board. It is the second journal of the Faculty of Law at the university (the other one being the Cambridge Law Journal).

The journal publishes articles, case notes, and book reviews on international law, comparative law, EU law, and transnational law in four issues throughout the year (two regular issues, a compendium of conference papers from the journal's conference and the UK Supreme Court Review – the latter is compiled by the editorial staff and analyses the work of the UK Supreme Court in the previous judicial year). The journal holds an annual conference on international law.

== History ==
Since its establishment in 2011, the journal has published three issues in its first volume, and four issues in the second volume, which addressed a range of topics including international law and dispute settlement, EU Law, human rights and comparative law providing a platform for both young and well-established academics to engage in dialogue with each other through publications in the journal. The journal has a double-blind peer-review process with an academic review board of eminent scholars in the field of International and Comparative Law. In its first two volumes, the journal has published a number of articles by prominent academics, established practitioners and pre-eminent judges, including Sir Christopher Greenwood of the International Court of Justice.

The senior treasurer of the journal is Dr Andrew Sanger and the current editors-in-chief are Marno Swart and Renatus Otto Franz Derler.

== CJICL Annual Conference ==
The journal hosts an International and Comparative Law Conference annually at Cambridge, usually at St John's Divinity School. The first Conference discussed the theme "Agents of Change: The Individual as a Participant in the Legal Process" and was attended by about. 110 participants from all over the world - Europe, the Americas, Asia, Africa and Australia – and at all stages in their academic career: from graduate students and young academics to established professors and practitioners. The second annual conference was held in May, 2013 on the theme of "Legal Tradition in a Diverse World", which saw ca. 150 participants presenting over 50 papers and included a key note address by Judge Yusuf of the International Court of Justice, a key note debate between Professors James Crawford and Alain Pellet chaired by Professor Catherine Redgwell and a key note lecture by Professor H. Patrick Glenn.

== UK Supreme Court Review ==
The journal publishes an annual special issue, the 'UK Supreme Court Review' that examines the decisions of the UK Supreme Court from the preceding judicial year. It is the only journal to produce a full issue review of the previous three terms of the work of the UK Supreme Court. The past two issues of the UK Supreme Court Review have featured articles from judges of the highest appellate courts internationally, including, Lord Phillips of Worth Matravers (formerly the President of the UK Supreme Court), Justice Marie Deschamps of the Supreme Court of Canada, Justice Hayne of the High Court of Australia, and Justice Gummow (formerly of the High Court of Australia).

== CJICL Online ==
The journal also maintains an online platform (called CJICL Online) which aims to provide a forum for discussion of on-going legal affairs related to the subject. Two blog posts on the site gained particular popularity when Julian Assange (who mistakenly believed their texts were related to the Cambridge Law Journal) cited them in an interview with the BBC.

== Former Editors-in-Chief ==
Volume 1 (2011–2012): Andrew Sanger, Rumiana Yotova

Volume 2 (2012–2013): Jasmine Moussa, Bart Smit Duijzentkunst

Volume 3 (2013–2014): Daniel Clarry, Valentin Jeutner, Cameron Miles

Volume 4 (2014–2015): Naomi Hart, Ana Júlia Maurício

Volume 5 (2015–2016): Catherine Gascoigne, Barry Solaiman

Volume 6 (2016–2017): Lan Nguyen, Niall O’Connor

Volume 7 (2017–2018): Richard Clements, Ya Lan Chang

Volume 8 (2018–2019): Eirini Kikarea, Maayan Menashe

Volume 9 (2019–2020): Catherine Drummond, Patrick Simon Perillo

Volume 10 (2020–2021): So Yeon Kim, Tom Boekestein

Volume 11 (2021–2022): Darren Peterson, Oliver Hailes

Volume 12 (2022–2023): Rebecca Brown, Alina Papanastasiou

Volume 13 (2023–2024): Helin Laufer, Liyu Feng

Volume 14 (2024–2025): Renatus Otto Franz Derler, Marno Swart

Volume 15 (2025–2026): Renatus Otto Franz Derler, Jonas Wieschollek

Volume 16 (2026–2027): Panpailin Jantarasombat, Tonia Schockmel
