= Ronald Roxburgh =

English judge

Sir Ronald Roxburgh
- Roxburgh in 1948 by Walter Stoneman

Justice of the High Court
- In office 1946–1960

Personal details
- Born: 19 November 1889 Eastbourne, Sussex
- Died: 19 August 1981 (aged 91) Hendon, Middlesex
- Resting place: Highgate Cemetery
- Education: University of Cambridge

Sir Ronald Francis Roxburgh (19 November 1889 – 19 August 1981) was a British barrister, High Court judge, and writer on international law and on the history of the Inns of Court.

== Life ==
Born at Eastbourne, Roxburgh was the only son of Francis Roxburgh (1850-1936) and Annie Gertrude Mortlock (1857-1948).

After graduating from Cambridge, Roxburgh was called to the bar from the Middle Temple in 1914, appointed King's Counsel in 1933, became a Justice of the Chancery Division of the High Court of Justice in 1946, knighted the same year, and retired in 1960. In his early years as a barrister he worked with the German jurist L. F. L. Oppenheim, a founder of the discipline of international law, who was Whewell Professor of International Law at Cambridge.

In 1935, Roxburgh married firstly Jane Minney, a daughter of Archibald H. and Lady Frances Gordon-Duff, herself a daughter of Hugh Fortescue, 3rd Earl Fortescue. They had one daughter, Mary Frances, born in 1936, who in 1959 married Brian Donald Boyd. Roxburgh's first wife died in 1960, and in 1966 he married secondly Dorothea Hodge.

Roxburgh died on 19 August 1981 and is buried in a family vault on the west side of Highgate Cemetery.

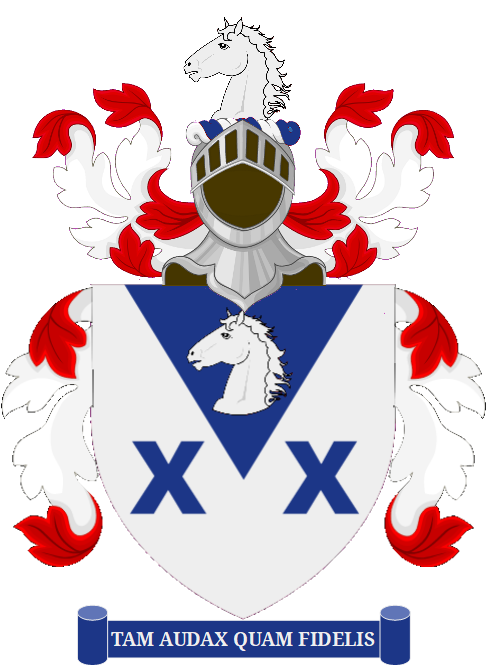
Armorial achievement

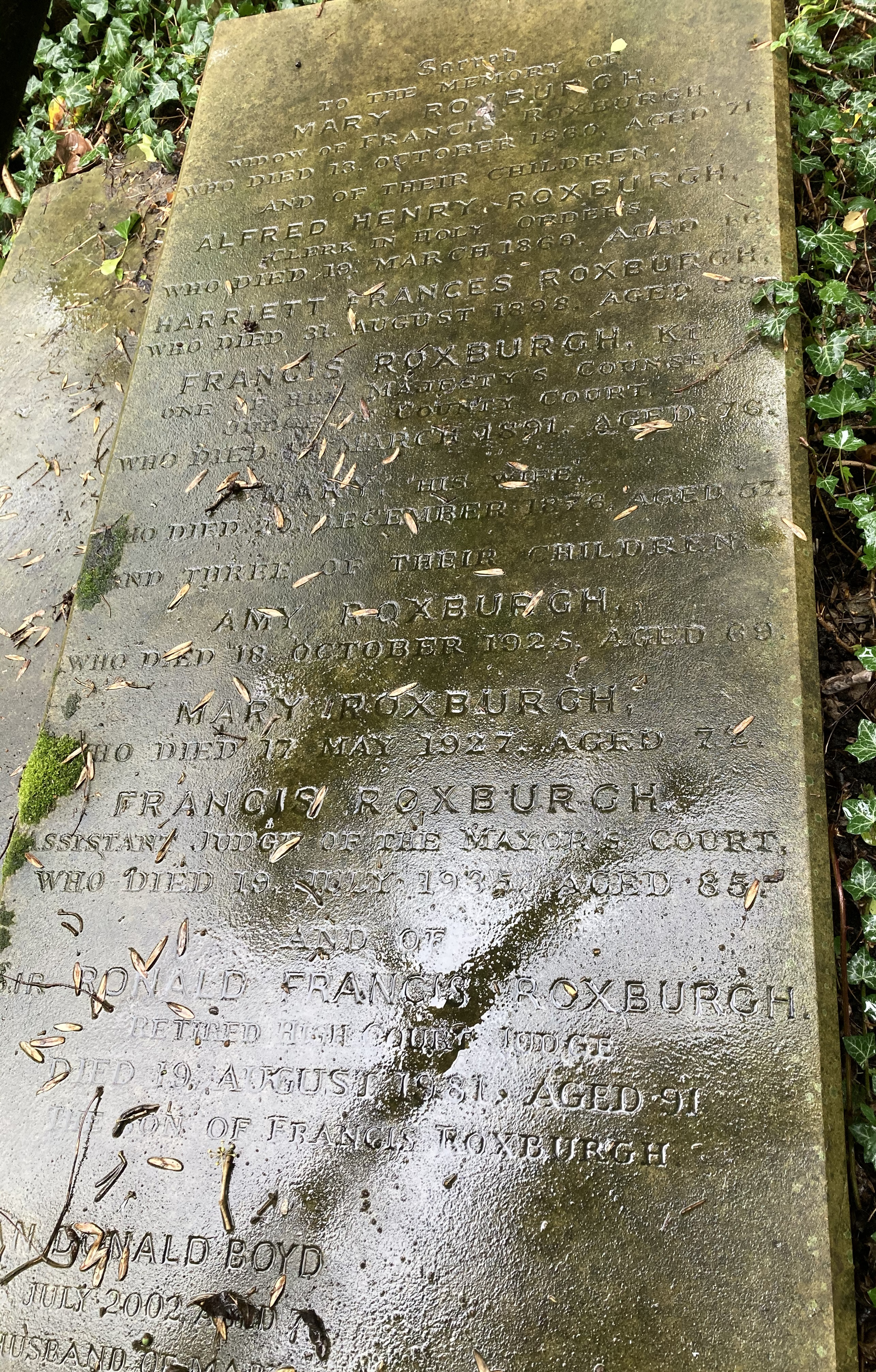
Family grave of Ronald Roxburgh in Highgate Cemetery

== Selected publications ==
- R. F. Roxburgh, The Prisoners of War Information Bureau in London; a study, with introduction by L. Oppenheim (1915)
- R. F. Roxburgh, International Conventions and Third States: a monograph (Longmans, Green and Co., 1917)
- R. F. Roxburgh, "Changes in the Conception of Neutrality" in Journal of Comparative Legislation and International Law 3rd Series, Vol. 1, No. 1 (1919), pp. 17–24
- R. F. Roxburgh, "The Future of International Law" in Edinburgh Review (Longmans, Green & Co. 1920)
- Lassa Oppenheim, et al., ed. Ronald Francis Roxburgh, International Law: A Treatise, Vol. 1 (1920)
  - International Law: A Treatise, Vol. 2 War And Neutrality
- Ronald Roxburgh, Origins of Lincoln's Inn (Cambridge University Press, 1963)
- Sir Ronald Roxburgh, ed., The Records of the Honourable Society of Lincolns Inn: the Black Books, Volume Five, AD 1845 to AD 1914 (1968)
- R. F. Roxburgh, "Rondel v. Worsley: Immunity of the Bar" Law Quarterly Review 84 (1968), p. 513
- Ronald F. Roxburgh, "Lawyers in the New Temple" Law Quarterly Review 88 (1972) pp. 415–430
- Ronald Roxburgh, "Two postscripts to the Black Books, Vol. V" (1977)
- Ronald F. Roxburgh, "Lincoln's Inn of the Fourteenth Century" Law Quarterly Review 94 (1978) pp. 363–382
