= Montevideo Convention =

1933 pan-American treaty on statehood

Convention on the Rights and Duties of States
- Ratifications and signatories of the treaty Parties Signatories Other Organization of American States members
- Signed: December 26, 1933
- Location: Montevideo, Uruguay
- Effective: December 26, 1934
- Signatories: 20
- Parties: 17 (as of November 2021)
- Depositary: Pan-American Union
- Languages: English, French, Spanish and Portuguese

Full text
- Montevideo Convention at Wikisource

The Montevideo Convention on the Rights and Duties of States is a treaty signed at Montevideo, Uruguay, on December 26, 1933, during the Seventh International Conference of American States. At the conference, United States President Franklin D. Roosevelt and Secretary of State Cordell Hull declared the Good Neighbor Policy, which opposed U.S. armed intervention in the domestic affairs of Latin America. The convention was signed by 19 states. The acceptance of Brazil, Peru and the United States as signatories was subject to minor reservations. The convention became operative on December 26, 1934. It was registered in the League of Nations Treaty Series on January 8, 1936.

The agreement established the standard definition of a sovereign state under international law. The conference is notable in U.S. history, since one of the U.S. representatives was Sophonisba Breckinridge, the first woman to be a representative for the U.S. at an international conference.

== Background ==
In most cases, the only avenue open to self-determination for colonial or national ethnic minority populations was to achieve international legal personality as a nation state. The majority of delegations at the International Conference of American States represented independent states that had emerged from former colonies. In most cases, their own existence and independence had been disputed or opposed by one or more of the European colonial empires. They agreed among themselves to criteria that made it easier for other dependent states with limited sovereignty to gain international recognition. For example, they did not include the standard of civilization in their criteria.

== Contents of the convention ==
Article 1 sets out the criteria for a "state as a person of international law":

The state as a person of international law should possess the following qualifications: (a) a permanent population; (b) a defined territory; (c) government; and (d) capacity to enter into relations with the other states.

The first sentence of Article 3 states that "the political existence of the state is independent of recognition by the other states." This is known as the declarative theory of statehood. It stands in contrast with the constitutive theory of statehood, by which a state exists only insofar as it is recognized by other states. It should not be confused with the Estrada doctrine. "Independence" and "sovereignty" are not mentioned in article 1.

An important part of the convention was a prohibition of using military force to gain sovereignty. According to Article 11 of the convention,

The contracting states definitely establish the rule of their conduct the precise obligation not to recognize territorial acquisitions or advantages that have been obtained by force whether this consists in the employment of arms, in threatening diplomatic representations, or in any other effective coercive measure

== Parties ==
Parties to the Montevideo Convention Parties Signatories Other Organization of American States members

The 17 states that have ratified this convention are limited to the Americas.

State	Signed	Deposited	Method
Brazil	Dec 26, 1933	Feb 23, 1937	Ratification
Chile	Dec 26, 1933	Mar 28, 1935	Ratification
Colombia	Dec 26, 1933	Jul 22, 1936	Ratification
Costa Rica (Note: The Organization of American States' database lists Costa Rica as signing the treaty, but the treaty does not include a signature by Costa Rica.)		Sep 28, 1937	Accession
Cuba	Dec 26, 1933	Apr 28, 1936	Ratification
Dominican Republic	Dec 26, 1933	Dec 26, 1934	Ratification
Ecuador	Dec 26, 1933	Oct 3, 1936	Ratification
El Salvador	Dec 26, 1933	Jan 9, 1937	Ratification
Guatemala	Dec 26, 1933	Jun 12, 1935	Ratification
Haiti	Dec 26, 1933	Aug 13, 1941	Ratification
Honduras	Dec 26, 1933	Dec 1, 1937	Ratification
Mexico	Dec 26, 1933	Jan 27, 1936	Ratification
Nicaragua	Dec 26, 1933	Jan 8, 1937	Ratification
Panama	Dec 26, 1933	Nov 13, 1938	Ratification
Paraguay	Dec 26, 1933	Sep 7, 2018	Ratification
United States	Dec 26, 1933	Jul 13, 1934	Ratification
Venezuela	Dec 26, 1933	Feb 13, 1940	Ratification

Notes

A further three states signed the convention on 26 December 1933, but have not ratified it.

- Argentina
- Peru
- Uruguay

The only state to attend the Seventh International Conference of American States, where the convention was agreed upon, which did not sign it was Bolivia. Costa Rica, which did not attend the conference, later signed the convention.

== Analysis ==
The Montevideo Convention codified several existing legal norms and principles, which apply to all subjects of international law.

The Badinter Committee, which consisted of arbitrators from several European countries, considered a state as having a territory, population, and organized political authority and that the existence of states was a question of fact, while the recognition by other states was purely declaratory.

Switzerland adheres to the same principle, stating that "neither a political unit needs to be recognized to become a state, nor does a state have the obligation to recognize another one. At the same time, neither recognition is enough to create a state, nor does its absence abolish it."

Actual state practices do not follow the Montevideo Convention exactly. While they play an important role, fulfilling its criteria do not automatically create a state because additional requirements must be met. The status of countries such as Kosovo and Somaliland largely depends on the recognition or non-recognition by other states.

== See also ==
- Sovereignty
- Foreign policy of the Franklin D. Roosevelt administration
