= Alexander Pearce Higgins =

British international law scholar (1865–1935)

Alexander Pearce Higgins CBE KC FBA (24 April 1865 – 2 April 1935) was a British international law scholar. He was Whewell Professor of International Law at the University of Cambridge (1920–1935), President of the Institut de Droit International (1929–1931), and a member of the Permanent Court of Arbitration (1930–1935).

== Education ==
The son of Alexander H. Higgins of Worcester, Pearce Higgins was educated at the King's School, Worcester (1876–82) and Downing College, Cambridge (matriculated 1888, Winchester Prize 1891, graduated BA and LL.B. 1891, MA 1895, LL.M. 1898, LL.D. 1904).

Before going up to Cambridge, Pearce Higgins had been articled to the Worcester solicitor Samuel Southall, and had already passed the Solicitors Final Examination of the Law Society. He was admitted as a solicitor in 1899, called to the bar at Lincoln's Inn in 1908 and made King's Counsel in 1919.

== Career ==
Teaching public international law at Cambridge from 1902, Pearce Higgins was named a lecturer at the London School of Economics in 1908 (replacing L. F. L. Oppenheim). A specialist in maritime law, he also taught at the Royal Naval War College and the Royal Naval College, Greenwich. During World War I, he served as an adviser in international law and prize law to Sir John Mellor, the Procurator General and Treasury Solicitor (head of the government legal service).

He was appointed Professor of International Law at the LSE in 1919, continuing at the LSE until 1923. He was appointed Whewell Professor of International Law at the University of Cambridge in 1920 (again succeeding Oppenheim), and a fellow of Trinity College, Cambridge in 1926. He was also Professor of International Law at The Hague Academy of International Law.

Pearce Higgins was an Associate of the Institut de Droit International from 1922, a Member from 1924, and President from 1929 to 1931. He became a member of the Permanent Court of Arbitration at The Hague in 1930.
