= Order of the White Double Cross =

Highest state decoration of Slovakia

Order of the White Double Cross Rád Bieleho dvojkríža
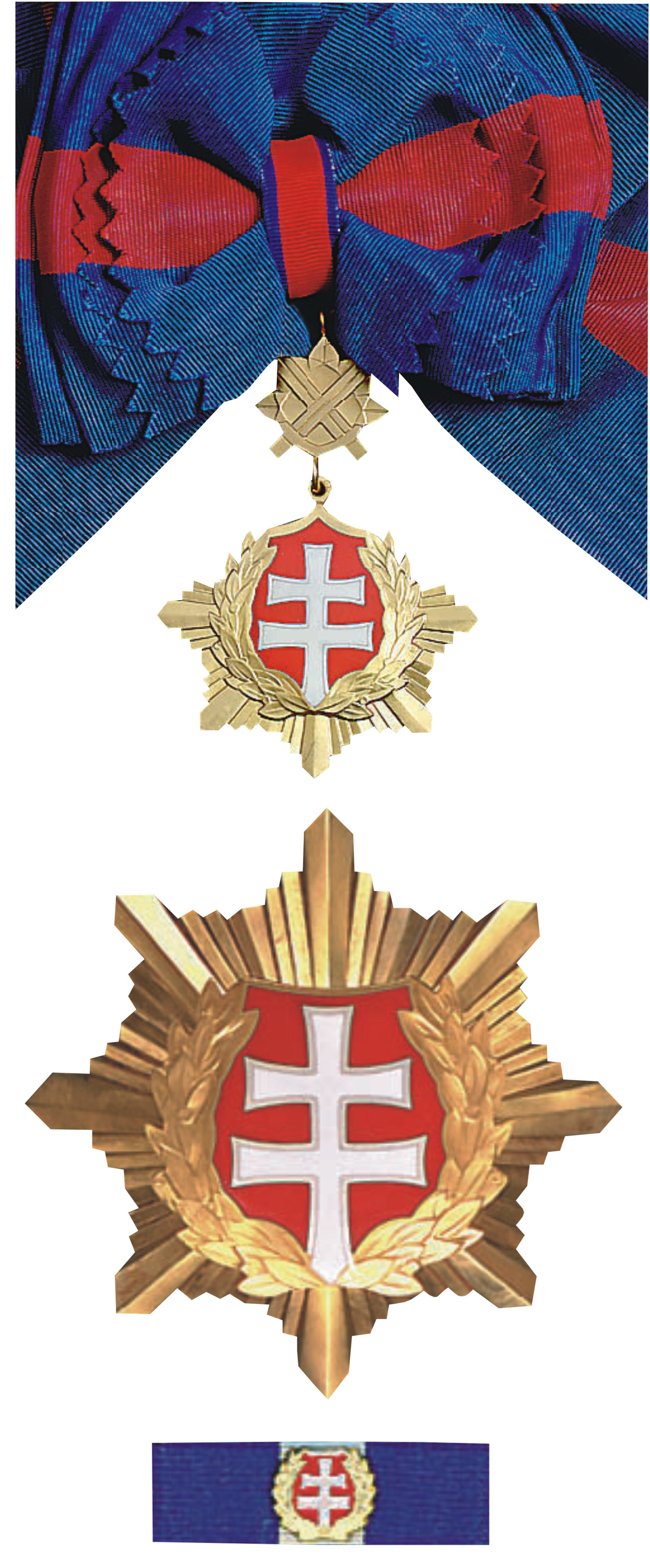
- Badge with sash and breast star of the First Class

Awarded by President of Slovakia
- Type: Order
- Eligibility: foreign persons
- Awarded for: Services to Slovakia
- Status: Currently constituted
- Sovereign: H.E. Peter Pellegrini
- Grades: Grand Cross; Grand Officer; Commander

Statistics
- First induction: H.Em. Jozef Tomko (1994)
- Last induction: H.E. Mathias Cormann (24 November 2025)
- Total inductees: 199 (total); 62 (1st Class); 92 (2nd Class); 45 (3rd Class)

Precedence
- Next (higher): None (highest)
- Next (lower): Andrej Hlinka Order
- Ribbon bar of the 1st Class Ribbon bar of the 2nd Class Ribbon bar of the 3rd Class

The Order of the White Double Cross (Slovak: Rad Bieleho dvojkríža) is the highest state decoration of the Slovak Republic.

The Order was instituted on 1 March 1994 after Slovakia became independent on 1 January 1993. It continues the Czechoslovak Order of the White Lion, which was created in 1922 as an award for foreigners.

The Order of the White Double Cross is conferred only upon foreign citizens, with the sole exception of the current President of Slovakia, who is awarded the Order by the National Council for the duration of their term of office upon inauguration.

According to the Order's statute, it is awarded:

- "for the comprehensive development of relations between the state, whose citizens they are and the Slovak Republic";
- "for the empowerment of the Slovak Republic’s position in international relations";
- "for meeting the foreign policy priorities of Slovakia";
- "for otherwise outstanding achievement in the benefit of the Slovak Republic"; or
- "for the outstanding spread of good reputation of Slovakia abroad."

== Classes ==
The Order of the White Double Cross has two divisions, civil and military, and three classes:

- First Class – badge may be worn on a sash on the right shoulder, plus the star is worn on the left chest;
- Second Class – badge may be worn on a necklet and the star is worn on the left chest;
- Third Class – badge may be worn on a necklet.
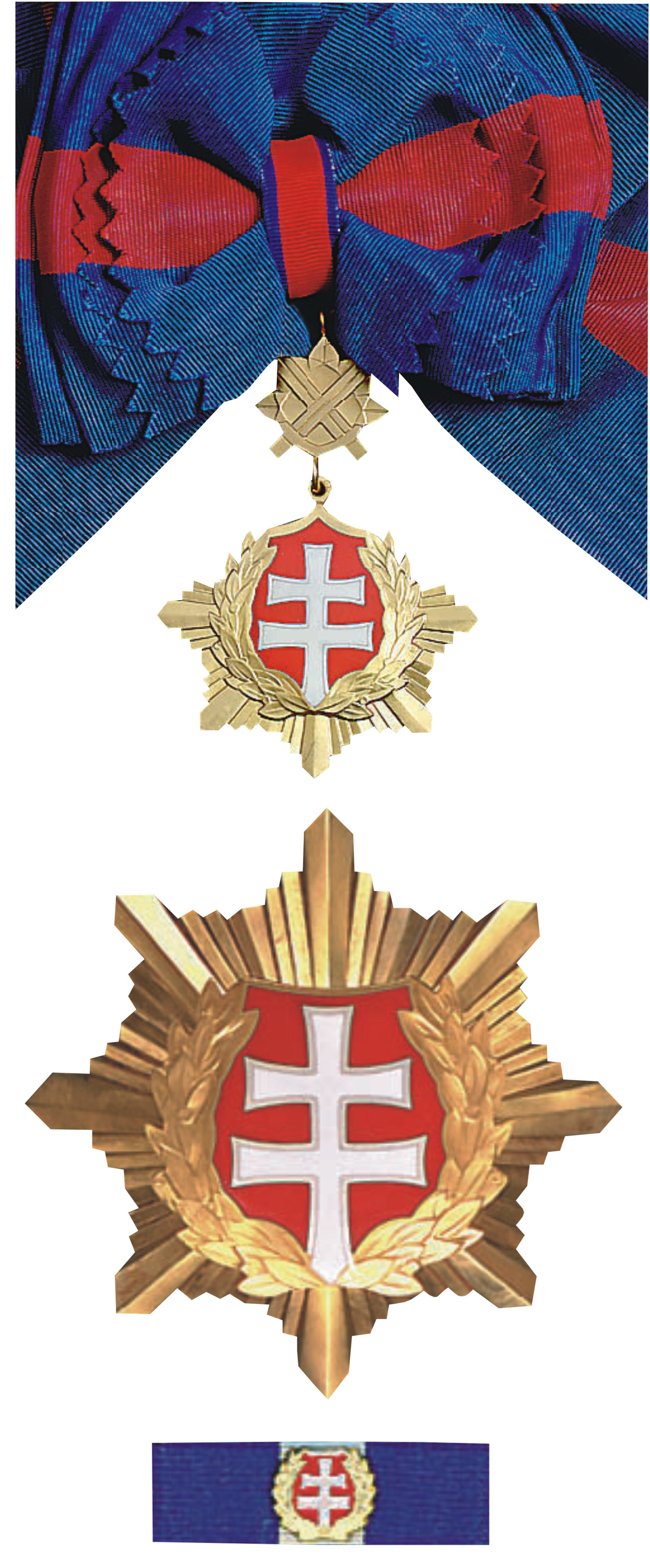
First Class (badge with sash and breast star)

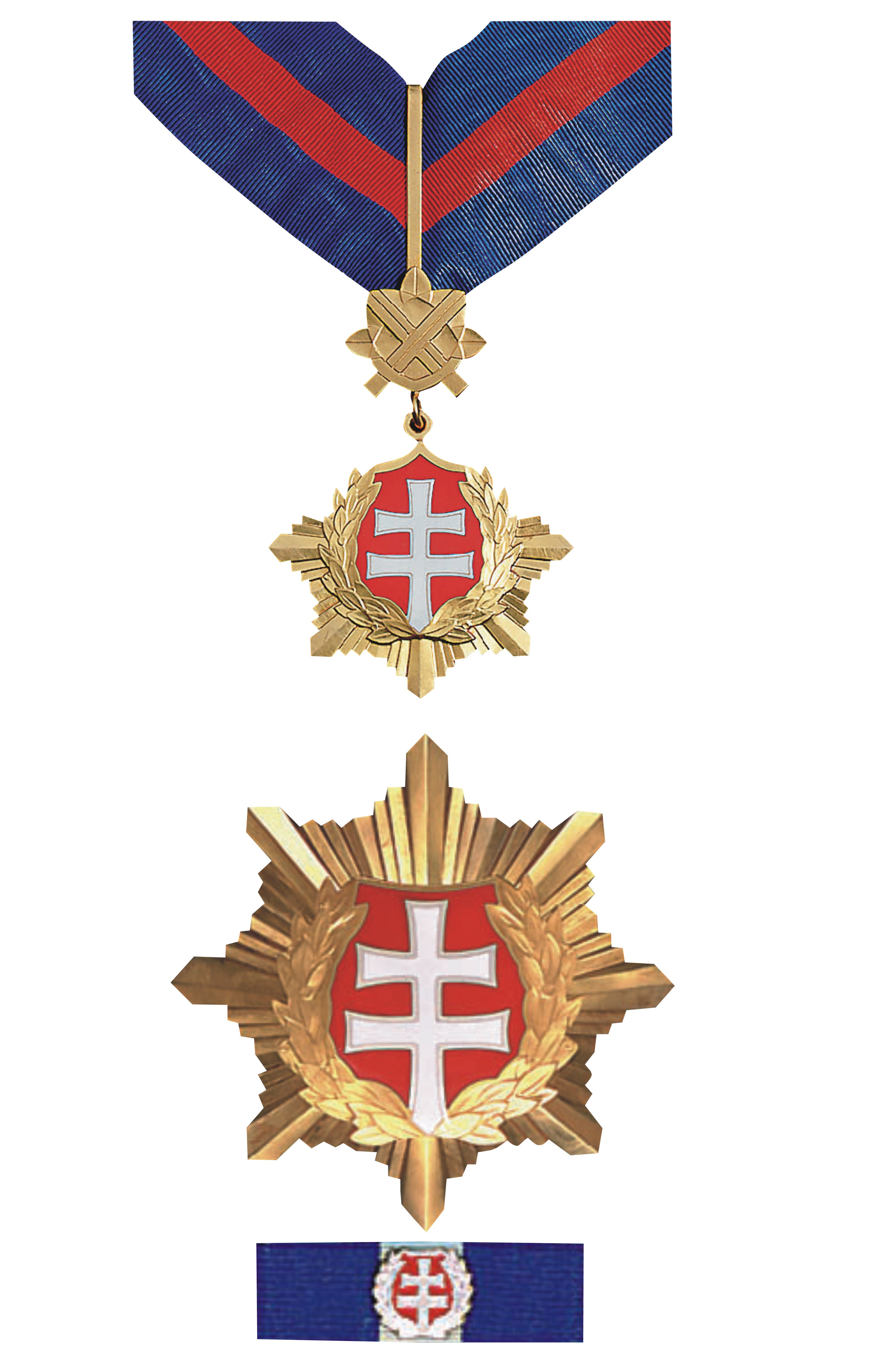
Second Class (badge with necklet and breast star)

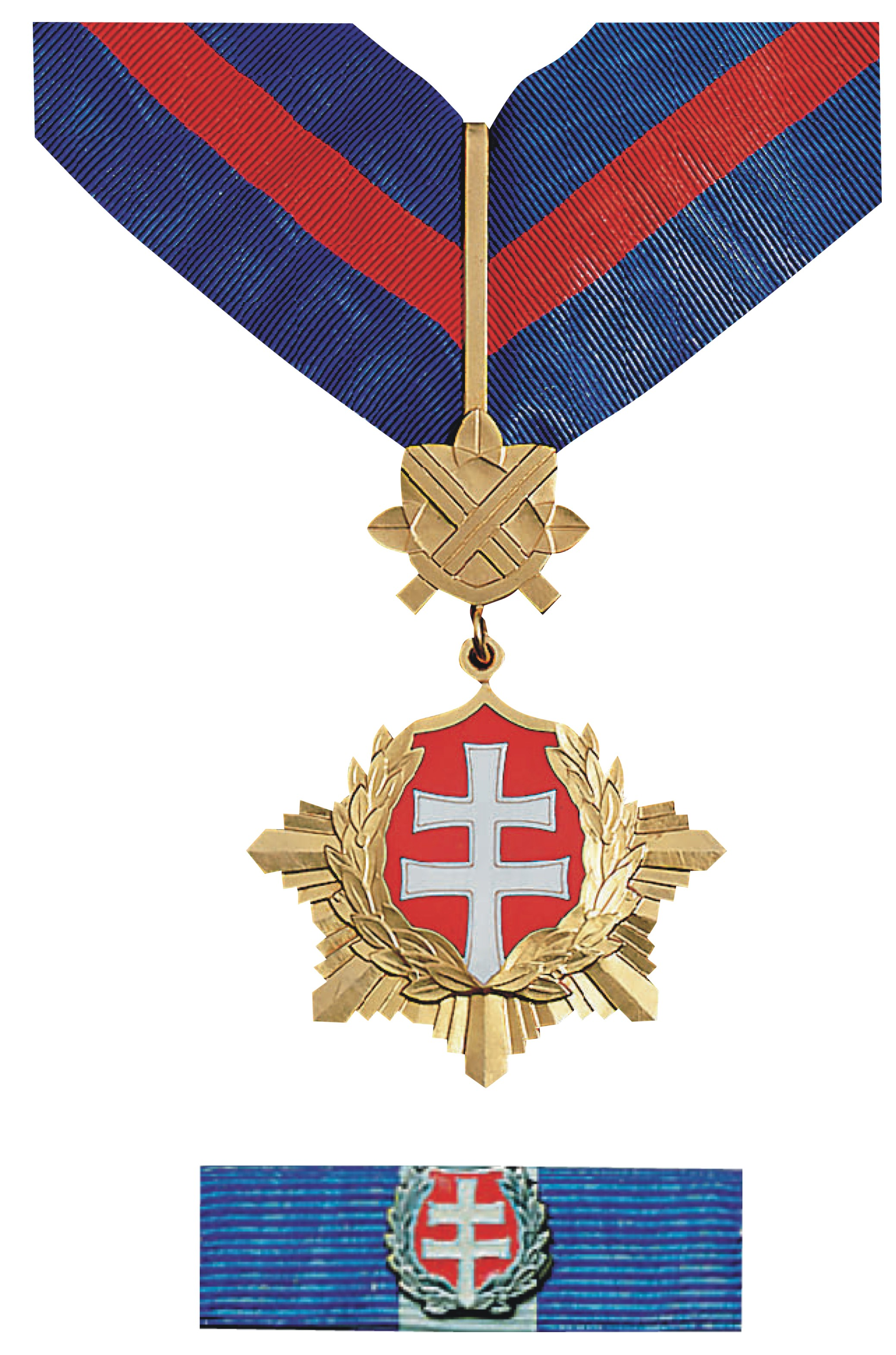
Third Class (badge with necklet)

== Insignia ==
The star is an eight-pointed gold breast star, with golden straight rays between the points of the star. The central disc on the star has a white double cross on a red enamel background, which is surrounded by a gold wreath of laurel and oak leaves.

The badge of the Order is of the same design as the star, although smaller. Furthermore, the upper point is missing and the badge is suspended on a stylized leaf of a common lime tree, with or without the crossed swords of the Military Division.

The ribbon of the order is blue with a red central stripe.

== Recipients ==
- First Class
  - Askar Akayev
  - Beatrix of the Netherlands
  - Andrew Bertie
  - Fernando Henrique Cardoso
  - Carl XVI Gustaf
  - Carlo Azeglio Ciampi
  - Emil Constantinescu
  - Mathias Cormann
  - Janez Drnovšek
  - Elizabeth II
  - Ivan Gašparovič
  - Joachim Gauck
  - Árpád Göncz
  - Tarja Halonen
  - Harald V of Norway
  - Václav Havel
  - Henri, Grand Duke of Luxembourg
  - Henrik, Prince Consort of Denmark
  - Jaap de Hoop Scheffer
  - François Hollande
  - Milada Horáková
  - Ion Iliescu
  - Don Johnston
  - Juan Carlos I of Spain
  - Lech Kaczynski
  - Thomas Klestil
  - Bronisław Komorowski
  - Franz König
  - Michal Kováč
  - Milan Kučan
  - Aleksander Kwasniewski
  - Émile Lahoud
  - Ricardo Lagos
  - Margrethe II of Denmark
  - Queen Máxima of the Netherlands
  - Stjepan Mesic
  - Narendra Modi
  - Giorgio Napolitano
  - Nursultan Nazarbayev
  - Tassos Papadopoulos
  - Petr Pavel
  - Heliodor Píka
  - Johannes Rau
  - Fernando de la Rúa
  - Arnold Rüütel
  - Juan Antonio Samaranch
  - Jorge Sampaio
  - Oscar Luigi Scalfaro
  - Angelo Sodano
  - Queen Sofía of Spain
  - Frank-Walter Steinmeier
  - Koloman Sokol
  - Konstantinos Stephanopoulos
  - Petar Stoyanov
  - Jozef Tomko
  - Alexander Van der Bellen
  - Max van der Stoel
  - Günter Verheugen
  - Rudolf Vrba
  - Willem-Alexander of the Netherlands
  - Volodymyr Zelenskyy
  - Miloš Zeman
- Second Class
  - Catherine Ashton
  - Ruzena Bajcsy
  - Wladyslaw Bartoszewski
  - Albrecht von Boeselager
  - Gene Cernan
  - Guillaume, Hereditary Grand Duke of Luxembourg
  - Ludwig Hoffmann-Rumerstein
  - Marta Kubišová
  - Adam Michnik
  - Štefan Osuský
  - Petr Pithart
  - Herman Van Rompuy
  - José Pedro Aguiar-Branco
- Third Class
  - Jacek Baluch
  - Gabriela Beňačková
  - Sir Derek Bowett
  - Viktor Fainberg
  - David O'Keeffe
  - Ryszard Siwiec
