= Thomas Fitzpatrick (academic) =

British academic (1861–1931)

Portrait by Walter Stoneman, 1921

Thomas Cecil Fitzpatrick (27 August 1861 – 28 October 1931) was the President of Queens' College, Cambridge, from 1906 until his death and Vice-Chancellor of Cambridge University in 1915–17 and 1928–29.

Fitzpatrick was the youngest son of the Rev. R. W. Fitzpatrick, Vicar of Holy Trinity, Bedford. He was educated at Bedford School and Christ's College, Cambridge. He went to Christ's on a scholarship and came top of the Natural Sciences Tripos examinations in 1883 and 1885. Having been elected as a Fellow of Christ's, he became Dean of the college in 1890. He served as one of Sir J.J. Thomson's demonstrators at the Cavendish Laboratory for many years. He also served as the Examining Chaplain to the Bishop of Salisbury, John Wordsworth between 1895 and 1911.

Fitpatrick was invited by the fellows to become President of Queens' College, Cambridge when the previous incumbent, Frederic Chase, was consecrated as Bishop of Ely in June 1906. During his time as president, he undertook many structural improvements to the college and was a large benefactor. He died in the President's Lodge on 28 October 1931.

He is buried at the Parish of the Ascension Burial Ground in Cambridge.

Academic offices
Preceded by Frederic Henry Chase	President of Queens' College, Cambridge; 1906–1931	Succeeded by John Archibald Venn
Preceded by Montague Rhodes James	Vice-Chancellor of the University of Cambridge; 1915–1917	Succeeded by Sir Arthur Everett Shipley
Preceded by George Arthur Weekes	Vice-Chancellor of the University of Cambridge; 1928–1929	Succeeded by Allen Beville Ramsay
