= D. P. O'Connell =

Barrister and professor of law (1924–1979)

D. P. O'Connell RD QC FRHistS
- Born: Daniel Patrick O'Connell; July 7, 1924; Auckland
- Died: June 8, 1979 (aged 54); Oxford
- Title: Chichele Professor of Public International Law

Academic background
- Education: Sacred Heart College, Auckland
- Alma mater: Auckland University College (BA, LLM); Trinity College, Cambridge (PhD)
- Thesis: The Law of State Succession (1951)
- Doctoral advisor: Hersch Lauterpacht

Academic work
- Discipline: Public international law
- Institutions: University of Adelaide; University of Oxford
- Notable students: James Crawford; Andrew Hsia

Daniel Patrick O'Connell RD QC FRHistS (7 July 1924 – 8 June 1979), known as D. P. O'Connell, was a New Zealand barrister and academic, specializing in international law. From 1972 to his death in 1979, he was Chichele Professor of Public International Law at the University of Oxford.

== Early life ==
He was born in Auckland, New Zealand, on 7 July 1924. He was educated at Sacred Heart College, Auckland and at Auckland University College. He was admitted to the New Zealand Bar in 1947 and then attended Trinity College, Cambridge in 1949, from where he obtained a doctorate in 1951.

== Career ==
In 1953 O'Connell was appointed reader in law at the University of Adelaide, South Australia, and in 1962 became the holder of a personal chair in international law and served as dean until 1964. His career then took him to Oxford in 1972, where he was elected Chichele Professor of Public International Law. He continued to keep an option to resume his chair in Adelaide, returning there for one term each year for three years. In 1972 he was awarded an additional doctorate of laws by the University of Cambridge.

His 1968 biography of Cardinal Richelieu was both well written and authoritative.

He was best known for his treatises on international law published in 1965 and on International Law of the Sea published after his death in 1982. Among his former pupils is James Crawford, who was elected as Judge of the International Court of Justice in 2014.

O'Connell died on 8 June 1979 in Oxford; he was buried in Auckland. He had been nominated for a British life peerage but this procedure was not completed before his death.
