= Jan Klabbers =

Dutch law professor

- Born: Johannes Antonius Maria Klabbers; August 13, 1963 (age 63); Heumen
- Title: Academy Professor (Martti Ahtisaari Chair)

Academic background
- Education: University of Amsterdam (LLM, PhD)
- Thesis: The Concept of Treaty in International Law (1996)
- Doctoral advisor: Bert Vierdag

Academic work
- Discipline: Public international law
- Sub-discipline: International institutional law
- Institutions: University of Helsinki
- Website: University of Helsinki

Johannes Antonius Maria "Jan" Klabbers (born 13 August 1963, Heumen, Netherlands) is a Dutch Academy Professor (Martti Ahtisaari Chair) at the University of Helsinki, on leave from his regular position as Professor of International Law at the University of Helsinki. He was Director of the Academy of Finland Centre of Excellence in Global Governance Research, based at the University of Helsinki, Faculty of Law, and deputy director of the Erik Castrén Institute of International Law and Human Rights. He has previously held several positions at the University of Amsterdam, where he also completed his doctoral degree.

Klabbers is considered to be one of the world's leading experts in the law of treaties and the law of international organizations. He has published several monographs and articles on the topics, some of the most important ones being The Concept of Treaty in International Law (1996), Treaty Conflict and the European Union (2008), An Introduction to International Organizations Law 3rd ed. (2015, previously An Introduction to International Institutional Law), and International Law (2013). In his recent work Klabbers has also been focusing on finding novel approaches to international legal research by combining it with virtue ethics.

Klabbers has held several visiting professorships/fellowships at different universities and institutes, including Hofstra University School of Law (2007), Graduate Institute of International and Development Studies, Geneva (2008, 2013), Straus Institute for the Advanced Study of Law and Justice, New York University Law School (2009–10), and Panthéon-Assas University (2011). He has also won several awards for his teaching.

In 2024 Klabbers was elected to the Whewell Professorship of International Law at the University of Cambridge, succeeding Eyal Benvenisti. He is expected to take up his professorship in October 2025.

== Lectures ==
- Jan Klabbers, "Treaty Conflict", United Nations Audiovisual Library of International Law, Lecture Series (accessed on 26 March 2013)
- Jan Klabbers, "Law, Ethics and Global Governance", United Nations Audiovisual Library of International Law, Lecture Series (accessed on 26 March 2013)
