= Baron McNair =

Barony in the Peerage of the United Kingdom

Baron McNair, of Gleniffer in the County of Renfrew, is a title in the Peerage of the United Kingdom. It was created on 4 August 1955 for the lawyer and judge Sir Arnold McNair. He was the first President of the European Court of Human Rights. As of 2010 the title is held by his grandson, the third Baron, who succeeded his father in 1989.

== Barons McNair (1955) ==
- Arnold Duncan McNair, 1st Baron McNair (1885–1975)
- Clement John McNair, 2nd Baron McNair (1915–1989)
- Duncan James McNair, 3rd Baron McNair (b. 1947)

The heir presumptive is the present holder's brother Hon. William Samuel Angus McNair (b. 1958).
The heir presumptive's heir apparent, and last in line, is his son John Samuel McNair (b. 1984).

Duncan James McNair was a member of the House of Lords from 6 August 1989 to 11 November 1999, until the House of Lords Act 1999 excluded most of the heredity peers.

== Notes ==
Coat of arms of Baron McNair
Crest On a wreath of the liveries an ancient ship under full sail flagged Azure the sail emblazoned of ensigns armorial as on the escutcheon. Escutcheon Gules three barrulets wavy Argent surmounted by a lion rampant Or armed and langued Azure between two thistleheads stalked and leaved paleways of the third. Supporters Two Bedlington terriers Proper Motto Danger in Delay
