= John Westlake (law scholar) =

British legal academic (1828–1913)

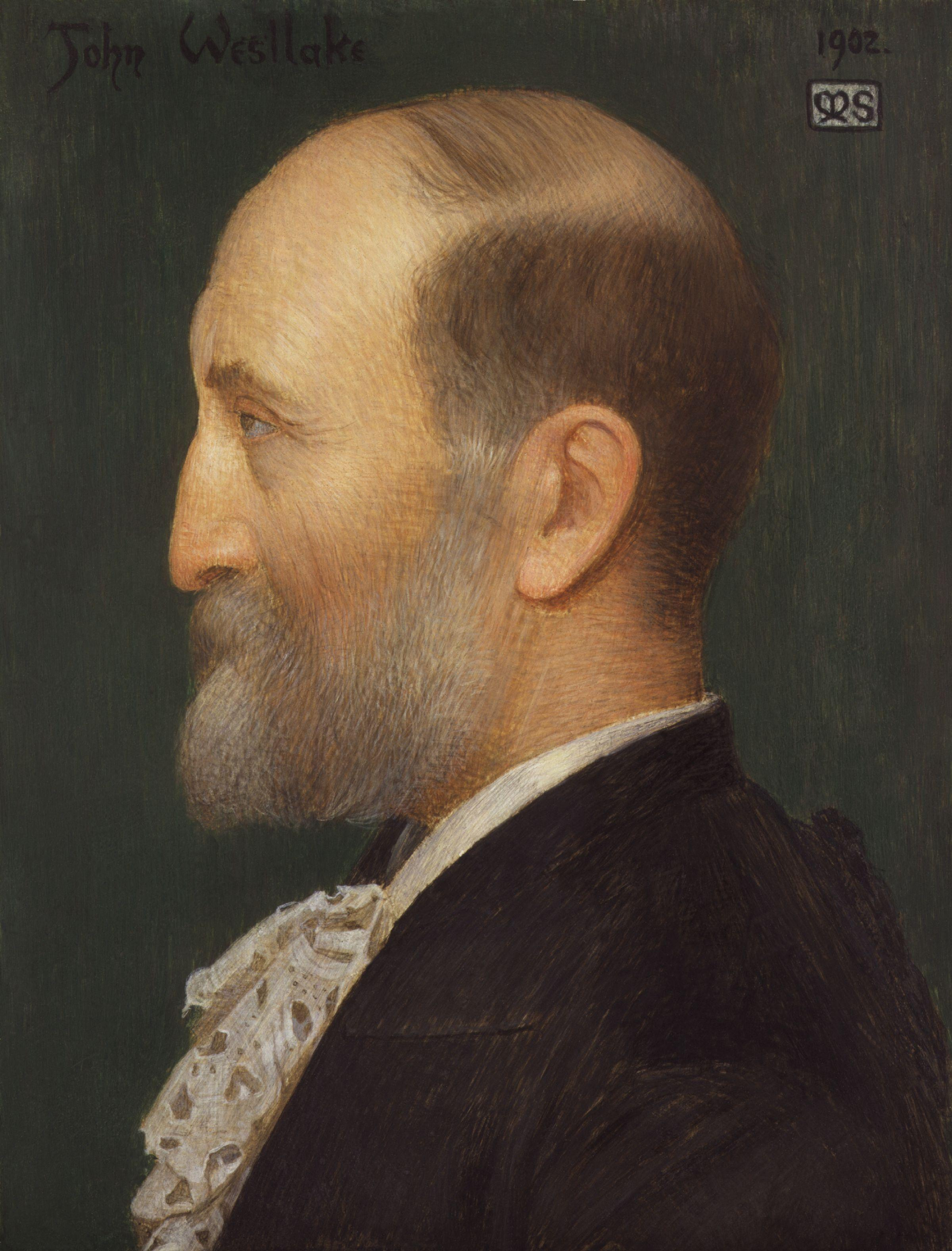
- Profile portrait of John Westlake by Marianne Stokes, 1902
- Born: 4 February 1828; Lostwithiel, Cornwall, UK
- Died: 14 April 1913 (aged 85); London
- Education: Trinity College, Cambridge
- Occupations: Academic lawyer and writer
- Employer: University of Cambridge
- Known for: Work in public international law
- Title: Whewell Professor of International Law
- Predecessor: Sir Henry Maine
- Successor: Lassa Francis Lawrence Oppenheim
- Spouse: Alice Hare

John Westlake (4 February 1828 – 14 April 1913) was an English law scholar, Liberal Member of Parliament, and social reformer. He co-founded the first journal devoted to international law, Revue de Droit International et de Legislation Comparée. Westlake was renowned for his influence in the realm of legal practice, particularly in addressing the complexities of disputes between individuals residing in distinct legal jurisdictions, a field commonly referred to as private international law or conflict of laws.

== Biography ==
He was born at Lostwithiel, Cornwall, the son of a Cornish wool-stapler. He was educated at Lostwithiel and, from 1846, at Trinity College, Cambridge, where he graduated BA (6th Wrangler and 6th Classic) in 1850. He was a fellow of Trinity from 1851 to 1860, called to the bar at Lincoln's Inn in 1854, and became a bencher of the Inn in 1874. In 1885 he was elected to Parliament as Liberal member for the Romford Division of Essex; from 1888 to 1908 he held the Whewell Chair as professor of international law at Cambridge; in 1900-06 he was a member for Great Britain of the International Court of Arbitration at The Hague.

In 1864 he married Alice Hare (1842–1923), artist and key supporter of the women's suffrage movement.

He was connected with the Christian Socialist Movement, being a member of the Committee of Teaching and Publication. He is considered to be one of the founders of the Working Men's College in 1854, where he taught mathematics for many years. He was an honorary president of the Institute of International Law.

In 1884, he authored the book Proportional Representation: A Practical Proposal, in which he outlined how the existing system of Cumulative Voting used to elect the London school board could be modified by the addition of a form of party-list proportional representation.

He served as a Liberal Member of Parliament from 1885 to 1886. He held the esteemed position of Whewell Professor of International Law at the University of Cambridge from 1888 to 1908. Westlake's advocacy extended to various social reforms, notably including the advancement of women's suffrage and active involvement in efforts to restore the constitution of Finland from 1899 to 1900.

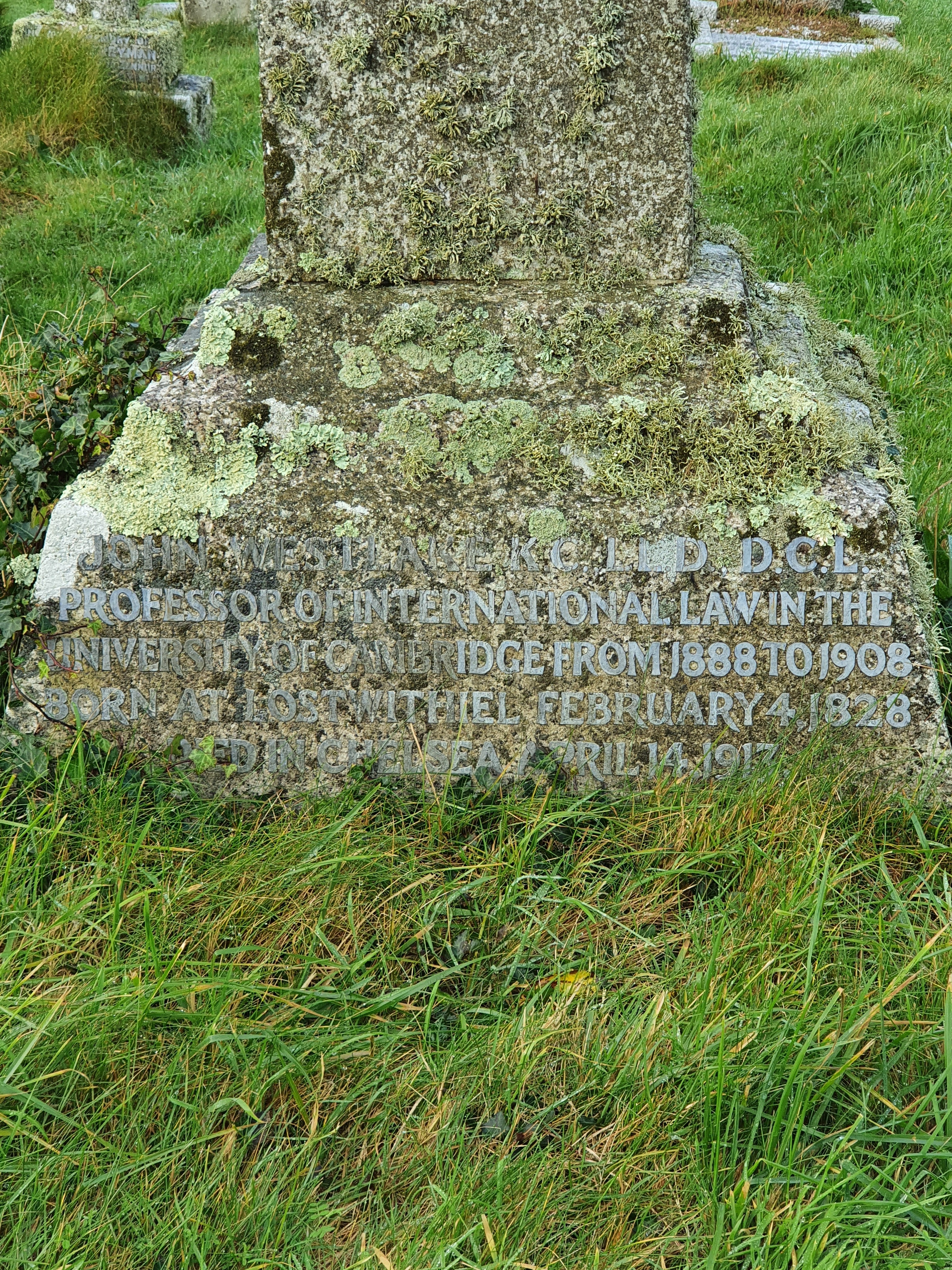
Westlake's grave

== Works ==
His works, of the highest importance in their field, include:

- A Treatise on Private International Law (1st ed.). London: W. Maxwell. 1858 – via Internet Archive.; Second edition, rewritten, 1880; fifth edition, 1912.
- Chapters on the Principles of International Law. Cambridge: At the University Press. 1894 – via Internet Archive.
- International Law Part I - Peace (1st ed.). Cambridge: At the University Press. 1904 – via Internet Archive.; International Law Part II- War (1st ed.). Cambridge: At the University Press. 1907 – via Internet Archive.; International Law Part I - Peace (2nd ed.). Cambridge: At the University Press. 1910 – via Internet Archive.; International Law Part II- War (2nd ed.). Cambridge: At the University Press. 1913 – via Internet Archive..
- Westlake, John (1911). "International Law (Private)" . In Chisholm, Hugh (ed.). Encyclopædia Britannica. Vol. 14 (11th ed.). Cambridge University Press. pp. 701–705.
- His Collected Papers on Public International Law were edited by L. Oppenheim in 1914.
- The Transvaal war: a lecture delivered in the University of Cambridge on 9th November, 1899 (2nd ed.), London: C. J. Clay and sons, 1899, Wikidata Q105802083

== See also ==
- Gustave Rolin-Jaequemyns

Parliament of the United Kingdom
New constituency	Member of Parliament for Romford; 1885 – 1886	Succeeded by James Theobald
