= James Crawford (jurist) =

Australian legal academic and practitioner (1948–2021)

His Excellency James Crawford AC SC FBA

Judge of the International Court of Justice
- In office 6 February 2015 – 31 May 2021
- Preceded by: Kenneth Keith
- Succeeded by: Hilary Charlesworth

Whewell Professor of International Law University of Cambridge
- In office 1992–2014
- Preceded by: Sir Derek Bowett
- Succeeded by: Eyal Benvenisti

Personal details
- Born: James Richard Crawford; 14 November 1948 Adelaide, South Australia
- Died: 31 May 2021 (aged 72) The Hague, Netherlands
- Spouse(s): Marisa Ballini; Patricia Hyndman; Joanna Gomula; Freya Baetens

Academic background
- Education: Brighton Secondary School
- Alma mater: University of Adelaide (LLB, BA); University College, Oxford (DPhil)
- Thesis: The Creation of States in International Law (1977)
- Doctoral advisor: Ian Brownlie
- Other advisor: D. P. O'Connell

Academic work
- Discipline: Public international law
- Institutions: University of Adelaide; University of Sydney; University of Cambridge
- Doctoral students: Christine Chinkin
- Main interests: Statehood, state responsibility
- Notable works: The Creation of States in International Law (1979/2006); ILC Articles on State Responsibility (2001)

James Richard Crawford, AC, SC, FBA (14 November 1948 – 31 May 2021) was an Australian academic and practitioner in the field of public international law. He was a Judge of the International Court of Justice from February 2015 to his death in 2021. From 1990 to 1992 Crawford was Dean of the Sydney Law School where he was also the Challis Professor of International Law from 1986 to 1992. From 1992 to 2014, he was Whewell Professor of International Law at the University of Cambridge and Fellow in Law at Jesus College, Cambridge. He was formerly Director of the Lauterpacht Centre for International Law, also at Cambridge.

== Early life and education ==
Born in Adelaide in South Australia in 1948, Crawford attended Brighton Secondary School and the University of Adelaide as an undergraduate, receiving his Bachelor of Laws degree with Honours in 1971 and a Bachelor of Arts (majoring in English history and politics) in the same year. During his time at the University of Adelaide, he first came in contact with international law, with the undergraduate course in the subject taught by D. P. O'Connell, who was later to be appointed Chichele Professor of International Law at the University of Oxford. Crawford later followed O'Connell to Oxford, was accepted to University College and completed his doctorate on the creation of states in international law under the supervision of Ian Brownlie, graduating in 1977.

== Career ==
=== Academic career ===
From Oxford, Crawford returned to the University of Adelaide in 1977, lecturing in international law and constitutional law, and was awarded a personal chair in 1983. In 1982, he accepted a position at the Australian Law Reform Commission and served until 1984, where he produced a series of reports on subjects such as the recognition of aboriginal customary law, sovereign immunity, and the reform, patriation and federalisation of Admiralty Law and jurisdiction. He remained in Adelaide until 1986, when he was appointed to the Challis Professorship of International Law at the University of Sydney. He served as Dean of the Faculty of Law from 1990 to 1992.

In 1985, Crawford was elected an associate of the Institut de Droit International (the youngest election in modern times) and was elevated to full membership in 1991.

In 1992, Crawford was elected to the Whewell Professorship of International Law at the University of Cambridge. In a nice piece of symmetry, his opposite number as Chichele Professor at Oxford was his DPhil supervisor Ian Brownlie. In that year, Crawford was also elected to membership of the United Nations International Law Commission ("ILC"). He served as Special Rapporteur on State Responsibility from 1997 to 2001 and was also responsible for the production of the ILC's Draft Statute for an International Criminal Court.

In 1996, Crawford assumed directorship of the Lauterpacht Centre for International Law at Cambridge, serving from 1997 to 2003 and again from 2006 to 2010. Since 2003 he has been a member of the Curatorium of The Hague Academy of International Law.

=== Professional career ===
Crawford was admitted to practice as a Barrister and Solicitor of the High Court of Australia in 1977 and was called to the New South Wales bar in 1987. He was appointed Senior Counsel in 1997.

Following his move to Cambridge, Crawford was admitted to the English bar in 1999 as a member of Gray's Inn, and was a foundation member of Matrix Chambers.

Crawford built a substantial international practice. He was engaged as counsel in 23 cases before the International Court of Justice ('ICJ'), including the contested cases of East Timor (Australia v Portugal), Case concerning the Oil Platforms (Islamic Republic of Iran v United States of America, Gabcikovo-Nagymaros Barrage System (Hungary v Slovakia), Case concerning Pulau Batu Puteh (Malaysia v Singapore) and Maritime Delimitation in the Black Sea (Romania v Ukraine). He also appeared as counsel for various interested parties in the following advisory opinions of the ICJ: Legality of the Threat or Use of Nuclear Weapons, Legal Consequences of the Construction of a Wall in the Occupied Palestinian Territory and Accordance with international law of the unilateral declaration of independence in respect of Kosovo.

In addition to his appearances before the ICJ, Crawford also appeared before a wide range of other international courts and tribunals. He was counsel for Australia before the International Tribunal for the Law of the Sea and the ad hoc tribunal convened under Annex VII of the United Nations Convention on the Law of the Sea in the Southern Bluefin Tuna cases, was counsel for Eritrea before the Eritrea/Ethiopia Boundary Commission and counsel for Sudan in the Abyei Dispute to determine whether Abyei was to form part of north Sudan or the area that was in 2011 to become South Sudan. He was also counsel for China before the Dispute Settlement Body of the World Trade Organization in the United States – Definitive Anti-Dumping case.

Crawford also developed a substantial practice as an international arbitrator, and developed a particular reputation in investor state disputes run by the International Centre for the Settlement of Investment Disputes ('ICSID') and in matters pertaining to the law of the sea, especially maritime boundary delimitation. Significant disputes in which Crawford sat as arbitrator include Larsen v Hawaiian Kingdom, Newfoundland/Nova Scotia Maritime Boundary Arbitration, Vivendi Universal v Argentina, Mondev International v United States of America, Yaung Chi Oo v Myanmar, SGS v Philippines, and the MOX Plant arbitration.

In October 2012, Crawford was nominated for election as a Judge of the International Court of Justice, with the support of the Australian Government. In November 2014, he was elected as an ICJ judge with an absolute majority of votes from the UN General Assembly and Security Council, and commenced his term in 2015.

== Death ==
James Crawford died in 2021 after a long illness, triggering a vacancy on the ICJ bench.

== Honours ==
Crawford was made a Doctor of Laws by the University of Cambridge in 2003. He held honorary doctorates from the University of Paris 1 Pantheon-Sorbonne, Pázmány Péter Catholic University, Budapest, the University of Amsterdam and his alma mater the University of Adelaide. He was awarded the Nessim Habif World Prize by the University of Geneva in 2010, and the Hudson Medal by the American Society for International Law and the Adelaide University Distinguished Alumni Award, respectively, in 2012.

In 2000, he was elected a Fellow of the British Academy (FBA).

Crawford was made a Companion (AC) in the General Division of the Order of Australia on 10 June 2013.

== Works ==
=== Publications ===
- James Crawford, Chance, Order, Change: The Course of International Law (Brill/Nijhoff 2014).
- James Crawford, State Responsibility (CUP 2013).
- James Crawford (ed), Brownlie's Principles of Public International Law (OUP 2012).
- James Crawford & Martti Koskenniemi (eds), The Cambridge Companion to International Law (CUP 2012).
- James Crawford, Alain Pellet & Simon Olleson (eds), The Law of International Responsibility (OUP 2010).
- James Crawford, The Creation of States in International Law (2nd edition, OUP 2006).
- James Crawford, R Doak Bishop & W Michael Reisman, Foreign Investment Disputes. Cases, Materials and Commentary (Kluwer 2005).
- James Crawford & Brian Opeskin, Australian Courts of Law (4th edition, OUP 2004).
- James Crawford, International Law as an Open System. Selected Essays (Cameron May 2002).
- James Crawford, The International Law Commission's Articles on State Responsibility: Introduction, Text and Commentaries (CUP 2002).
- James Crawford & Philip Alston, The Future of UN Human Rights Treaty Monitoring (CUP 2000).
- James Crawford (ed), The Rights of Peoples (OUP 1988).
- James Crawford, The Creation of States in International Law (OUP 1979) (adaptation of DPhil thesis).

In addition, from 1994 Crawford was editor of the British Yearbook of International Law, and senior editor after the retirement of Ian Brownlie from Oxford in 2000. He was co-editor of the Cambridge Studies in International and Comparative Law and the ICSID Reports. From 2002 to 2005 he was a member of the Editorial Panel of the World Trade Review. From 2004, he was a member of the Board of Editors for the American Journal of International Law. He published peer-refereed journal articles in the International and Comparative Law Quarterly, the American Journal of International Law, the British Yearbook of International Law and other significant international law journals. He was also Senior Treasurer of the Cambridge Journal of International and Comparative Law.

=== Lectures ===
- Lecture by James Crawford entitled The International Law Commission's Articles on State Responsibility: Past and Future in the Lecture Series of the United Nations Audiovisual Library of International Law

== See also ==
Rebecca Huntley (daughter)

== Bibliography ==
- Introductory note by James Crawford on the Articles on Responsibility of States for Internationally Wrongful Acts in the Historic Archives of the United Nations Audiovisual Library of International Law
- Dingle, Lesley (13 August 2018). "A Biography of James Richard Crawford: Academician and Jurist". SSRN.
