= John Archibald Venn =

British economist

John Archibald Venn CMG FSA JP

Vice-Chancellor of the University of Cambridge
- In office 1941–1943
- Preceded by: Ernest Alfred Benians
- Succeeded by: Thomas Shirley Hele

President of Queens' College, Cambridge
- In office 1932–1938
- Preceded by: Thomas Cecil Fitzpatrick
- Succeeded by: Arthur Armitage

Personal details
- Born: 10 November 1883
- Died: 15 March 1958 (aged 74)
- Education: Trinity College, Cambridge; Eastbourne College

Military service
- Allegiance: United Kingdom
- Branch/service: British Army
- Rank: Lieutenant
- Unit: Cambridgeshire Regiment

John Archibald Venn (10 November 1883 – 15 March 1958) was a British economist. He was President of Queens' College, Cambridge, from 1932 until his death, Vice-Chancellor of Cambridge University 1941–1943, university archivist, and author, with his father, of Alumni Cantabrigienses. His father was logician John Venn (the creator of the Venn diagram).

Venn was educated at Eastbourne College and Trinity College, Cambridge. He took his honours in the History Tripos in 1904–1905. During the First World War he was a lieutenant for three years in the Cambridgeshire Regiment and then served as a statistician in the Food Production Department. He served on the Scientific Council of the International Institute of Agriculture and many other Departmental committees of the Ministry of Agriculture. Venn was elected a Fellow in 1927 and had been a Junior Fellow and Bursar at Queens' before being elected president on the death of Thomas Cecil Fitzpatrick in 1932. At the time he was the youngest Head of a college in Cambridge. He was also the Gilbey Lecturer in Agriculture.

The Guyanese writer Arthur Seymour was visiting Venn in the Queens' College Presidential Lodge when Venn showed Seymour the proofs of Alumni Cantabrigienses. Thirty years later the memory of seeing these proofs inspired Seymour to propose the creation of a Guyana National Encyclopedia modelled on the Australian National Encyclopedia. Although Seymour failed to gain financial support for the project, Venn's example did inspire Seymour to publish two volumes of the Dictionary of Guyanese Biography which were published in 1984 and 1986.

Venn is buried at Trumpington Churchyard Extension, South Cambridge, at the junction of Shelford Road and Hauxton Road. His grave located about halfway along path, on East side, shaded by trees.

Academic offices
Preceded by Thomas Cecil Fitzpatrick	President of Queens' College, Cambridge; 1932–1958	Succeeded by Arthur Armitage
Preceded by Ernest Alfred Benians	Vice-Chancellor of the University of Cambridge; 1941–1943	Succeeded by Thomas Shirley Hele
