= Malcolm Shaw (lawyer) =

British lawyer and academic (born 1947)

Malcolm Shaw KC
- Born: Malcolm Nathan Shaw; 1947 (age 78–79)
- Occupations: Legal academic; author; editor; lawyer

Academic background
- Education: University of Liverpool (LLB); Hebrew University of Jerusalem (LLM); Keele University (PhD)

Malcolm Nathan Shaw KC (born 1947) is a British legal academic, author, editor and lawyer.

== Early life ==
Shaw studied at the University of Liverpool (LLB), the Hebrew University of Jerusalem (LLM) and Keele University (PhD).

== Career ==
Shaw was the Sir Robert Jennings Professor of International Law at the University of Leicester and taught international law, human rights and equity and trusts. Following retirement, he was appointed as Senior Fellow at the Lauterpacht Centre for International Law at the University of Cambridge and made a Trustee of the British Institute of International and Comparative Law. He is a practising barrister and jurist.

He teaches a course on human rights at the Hebrew University of Jerusalem each year.

He is the author of a best selling book on International Law (first published in 1977; 6th edition released in 2008). He also edited Title to Territory, a collection of articles on title and sovereignty in international law. His textbook is one of the key tomes used in introductory courses on international law.

Shaw has appeared before the European Court of Human Rights, European Court of Justice, the UK Supreme Court, and the International Court of Justice (ICJ). Before the ICJ, he has represented countries such as the UAE, Serbia, and Cameroon. He has represented Azerbaijan, Ukraine, Ireland, and Malaysia in front of the other courts. In January 2024, he was on the four-person team representing Israel in the case brought by South Africa in the ICJ regarding accusations of genocidal acts by Israel in Gaza in the course of the Gaza war.

== Selected works ==
Shaw's published writings encompass 20 works in 54 publications in three languages and 2,999 library holdings.

- International Law (1977)
- Dispute-settlement in Africa (1983)
- International Law and Intervention in Africa (1985)
- Title to Territory in Africa: International Legal Issues (1986)
- Genocide and International Law (1989)
- The Definition of Minorities in International Law (1991)
- Succession d'états aux biens et aux dettes: opinion à la Commission d'étude des questions afférentes à l'accession du Québec à la souveraineté (1992)
- La dette extérieure (1995)
- The International Court of Justice: a Practical Perspective (1997)
- The Heritage of States: the Principle of "uti possidetis juris" Today (1997)
- Nemzetközi jog (2001)
- Title to Territory (2005)
- The International Law of Territory (2008)

== Lectures ==
- The International Legal Principles Relating to Territorial Disputes: The Acquisition of Title to Territory in the Lecture Series of the United Nations Audiovisual Library of International Law
- Settling Territorial Disputes in the Lecture Series of the United Nations Audiovisual Library of International Law
- Principles of Maritime Delimitation in the Lecture Series of the United Nations Audiovisual Library of International Law
