= Jacek Baluch =

Polish scholar

- Born: 17 March 1940; Kraków, Poland
- Died: 3 July 2019 (aged 79); Kraków, Poland
- Resting place: Salwator Cemetery
- Citizenship: Polish
- Education: Jagiellonian University
- Children: three
- Scientific career
- Fields: Czech literature, versification, theory of translation
- Workplaces: Jagiellonian University
- Thesis: (1968)

Jacek Bogdan Baluch (17 March 1940 – 3 July 2019) was a Polish scholar, writer, poet, translator and politician.

== Life ==
Jacek Baluch was born on 17 March 1940 in Kraków. He studied Slavic philology at the Jagellonian University in Kraków and at Charles University in Prague. He was a Slavist, and in the first place a Bohemist. He took an M.A. in 1962, earned his doctor's degree in 1968 and obtained habilitation in 1982. Much later, in 2008, he was nominated a professor. He had a wife and three children.

He died on 3 July 2019 in Kraków.

=== Political activity ===
Baluch was very active in the Solidarity movement in the early eighties. Because of that, he was imprisoned at Załęże by Martial law. In the years 1990–1995 he was the ambassador of the Republic of Poland to Czechoslovakia and (after the secession of Slovakia) to the Czech Republic. He is said to play an important role in establishing cooperation in the Visegrád Group. In 2015 he was awarded by the Czech government for his work for Polish-Czech good relations with the prize Gratia Agis.

=== Scholarly work ===
Baluch wrote many books and papers on Czech literature, especially about avant garde (poetismus in Czech) and fiction by Bohumil Hrabal. He has been a teacher of some generations of students in Kraków and Opole. His main interest were versification and the theory of translation.

=== Poetry and translations ===
Baluch was a writer and poet. He writes chiefly short pure nonsense poems, for example Limericks. He also translated some books and poems from Czech into Polish. Among others, he translated and edited a book of Medieval Czech love poetry. He made a translation of the famous children's poem Lokomotywa (The Locomotive) by Julian Tuwim from Polish into Czech.

== Honours ==
- Officer of the Order of Polonia Restituta (Poland, 2014)
- Knight of the Order of Polonia Restituta (2001)
- Commander of the Order of the White Double Cross (Slovakia, 1998)
- Medal of Merit, 1st Grade (Czech Republic, 1997)

== Bibliography ==
- Poetyzm. Propozycja czeskiej awangardy lat dwudziestych, Wrocław 1969.
- Język krytyczny F.X. Šaldy, Kraków 1982.
- Czescy symboliści, dekadenci, anarchiści przełomu XIX i XX wieku, Wrocław 1983.
- [ed.]: František Halas, Wybór poezji, Wrocław 1975.
- Drzewo się liściem odziewa, Kraków 1981 (translation).
- Ladislav Klíma, Cierpienia księcia Sternenhocha (translation).
- Jaroslav Hašek, Historia Partii Umiarkowanego Postępu (w Granicach Prawa) (translation)
- (together with Piotr Gierowski, Czesko-polski słownik terminów literackich, Kraków 2016.
