= Marc Weller (professor) =

British academic

Marc Weller is Professor of International Law and International Constitutional Studies at Cambridge University, England, and a fellow of Hughes Hall, Cambridge working in its Department of Politics and International Studies (POLIS). He was the Director of the Lauterpacht Centre for International Law. He has been an adviser in many international peace negotiations.
