= United Nations Security Council Resolution 980 =

UN Security Council Resolution 980
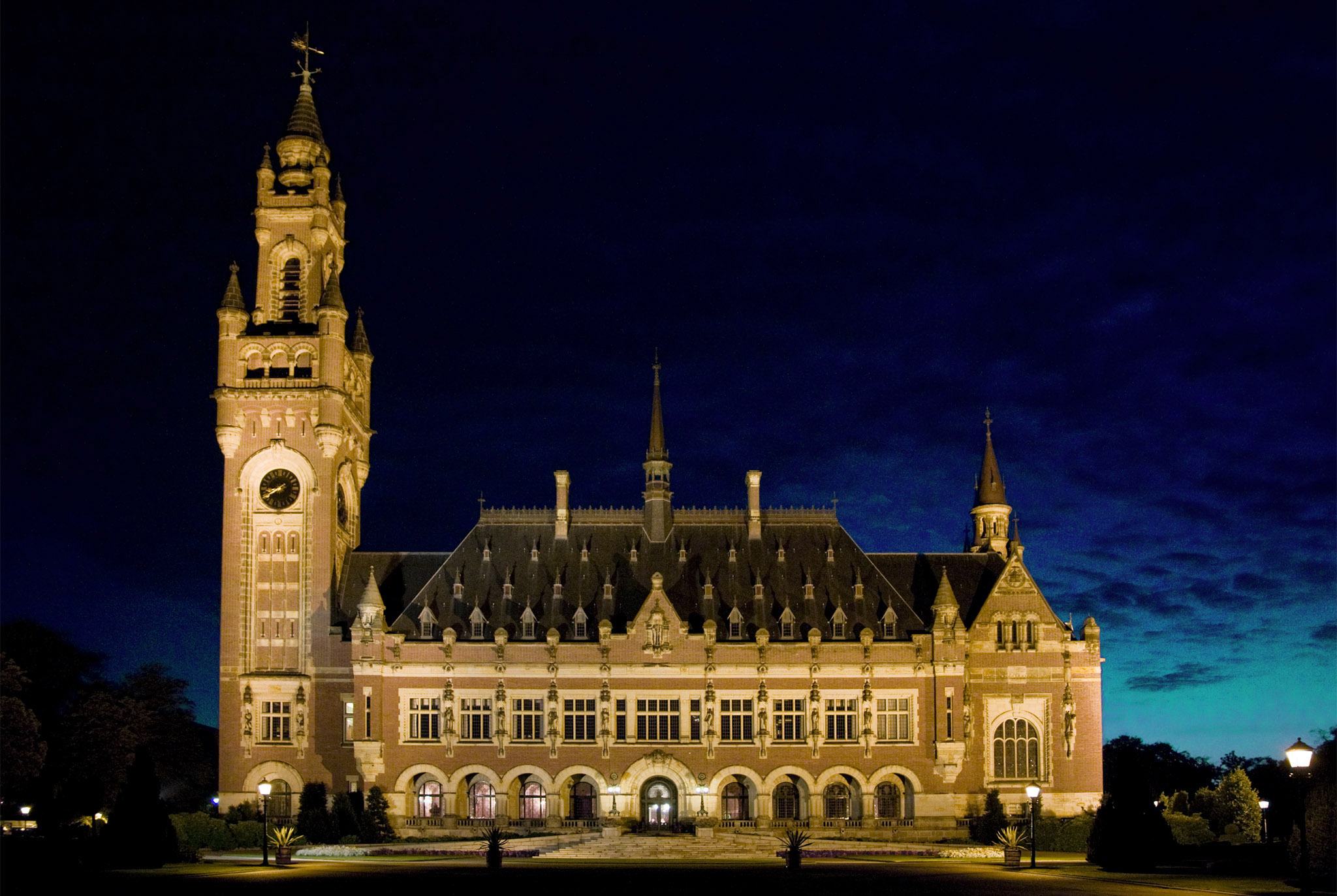
- ICJ building at night
- Date: 22 March 1995
- Meeting no.: 3,510
- Code: S/RES/980 (Document)
- Subject: International Court of Justice
- Result: Adopted

Security Council composition
- Permanent members: China; France; Russia; United Kingdom; United States
- Non-permanent members: Argentina; Botswana; Czech Republic; Germany; Honduras; Indonesia; Italy; Nigeria; Oman; Rwanda

United Nations Security Council resolution 980, adopted without a vote on 22 March 1995, after noting the resignation of International Court of Justice (ICJ) judge Sir Robert Yewdall Jennings which would take effect on 10 July 1995, the council decided that elections to the vacancy on the ICJ would take place on 12 July 1995 at the security council and at a meeting of the General Assembly during its 49th session.

Jennings, a British jurist, was a member of the court since 1982 and its president from 1991 to 1994.

== See also ==
- Judges of the International Court of Justice
- List of United Nations Security Council Resolutions 901 to 1000 (1994–1995)
