= Allen Beville Ramsay =

English academic and Latin poet (1872-1955)

Allen Beville Ramsay (3 August 1872 – 20 September 1955) was an English academic and Latin poet. He was Master of Magdalene College, Cambridge and Vice-Chancellor of the University of Cambridge.

He was the son of Beville and Sarah Maria Ramsay of Croughton House, Brackley, Northamptonshire.

Ramsay was educated at Eton and King's College, Cambridge. He matriculated in 1891 and received an M.A. in 1901.

From 1895 to 1925 he taught at Eton, returning to Cambridge as Master of Magdalene College, Cambridge, 1925-47. The College Fellows preferred another candidate, A. S. Ramsey, but the Hereditary Visitor of Magdalene, Lord Braybrooke chose to appoint Ramsay. He served as Vice-Chancellor, 1929–31 and President of Cambridge University Cricket Club between 1933 and 1947. Ramsay Hall, the largest room in Bright's Building in Magdalene, is named after him; it was refurbished in 1949 to become the college canteen.

Ramsay has been described as "probably the most significant British Latin poet of the twentieth century". He published collections of Latin and English verse with botanically inspired titles: Inter Lilia (1920), Ros Rosarum (1925), Frondes Salicis (1935), Flos Malvae (1946), and Ros Maris (1954).

Academic offices
Preceded by A. C. Benson	Master of Magdalene College, Cambridge; 1925–1947	Succeeded by Henry Urmston Willink
Preceded by Thomas Cecil Fitzpatrick	Vice-Chancellor of the University of Cambridge; 1929–1931	Succeeded by William Spens
