= Arthur Armitage =

British academic

Sir Arthur Llewellyn Armitage
- Armitage in June 1958.

Vice-Chancellor of the University of Cambridge
- In office 1965–1967
- Preceded by: John Sandwith Boys Smith
- Succeeded by: Sir Eric Ashby

President of Queens' College, Cambridge
- In office 1958–1970
- Preceded by: John Archibald Venn
- Succeeded by: Sir Derek Bowett

Personal details
- Born: Arthur Llewellyn Armitage; 1 August 1916 Marsden, West Yorkshire, England
- Died: 1 February 1984 (aged 67) Cambridge, England
- Education: Hulme Grammar School
- Alma mater: Queens' College, Cambridge

Sir Arthur Llewellyn Armitage (1 August 1916 – 1 February 1984), was a British academic who was the President of Queens' College, Cambridge, from 1958 until 1970, Vice-Chancellor of Cambridge University between 1965–67 and Vice-Chancellor of Victoria University of Manchester between 1969 and 1980.

== Biography ==
Born in Marsden, West Yorkshire (then in the West Riding of Yorkshire), Armitage was educated at Hulme Grammar School and in 1933 went to Queens' College, Cambridge, where he gained a first class degree in Law. After he spent two years at Yale on a Commonwealth Fund Fellowship and was called to the Bar in Inner Temple 1940. He served for five years in the Army during the Second World War, achieving the rank of Major.

He became a Fellow and tutor of the college in 1947. He was elected President of Queens' in 1958 upon the death of John Archibald Venn. In 1969 he was appointed Vice-Chancellor of the Victoria University of Manchester. He later served as Chairman of the Committee of Vice-Chancellors.

In his later years, Armitage chaired a series of government committees under James Callaghan and Margaret Thatcher, including the Social Security Advisory Committee; the Armitage Committee, set up to review the rules governing the political activities of civil servants; and an independent inquiry into lorries and their effect on people and the environment.

Armitage was President of Cambridge University Cricket Club between 1965 and 1970.

He was knighted in the 1975 New Year Honours List.

The Armitage Centre (including conference, exhibition and sports facilities) on the university's Fallowfield campus was named after him. The site includes a number of sports grounds where lacrosse and other sports have been played.

Academic offices
Preceded by John Archibald Venn	President of Queens' College, Cambridge; 1958–1970	Succeeded by Sir Derek Bowett
Preceded by John Boys Smith	Vice-Chancellor of the University of Cambridge; 1965–1967	Succeeded by Sir Eric Ashby
Preceded by Sir William Mansfield Cooper	Vice-Chancellor of The University of Manchester; 1969–1980	Succeeded by Sir Mark Richmond
