= Elihu Lauterpacht =

British academic and lawyer

Sir Elihu Lauterpacht CBE QC (13 July 1928 – 8 February 2017) was a British academic and lawyer, who specialized in international law. The son of Sir Hersch Lauterpacht, he was founder of the Lauterpacht Centre for International Law at the law faculty in Cambridge University.

== Early life and education ==
Lauterpacht was born on 13 July 1928 in Cricklewood, London, to Rachel and Hersch Lauterpacht, and was educated at King's College School, Cambridge. As the Second World War broke out, Professor Hersch Lauterpacht was invited by the Carnegie Endowment to take a visiting professorship in the United States, so with the approval and encouragement of the British Foreign Office, the Lauterpacht family left for America in September 1940.

For a year Lauterpacht attended the private Horace Mann School in the Bronx before joining the Phillips Academy in Andover, Massachusetts. After graduating in June 1944, Lauterpacht returned to the United Kingdom.

After returning to England, Lauterpacht entered Trinity College, Cambridge in 1945, initially reading history, before switching to the law tripos.

== Career ==
In 1950 he was called to the Bar from Gray's Inn. In 1953 he became a Fellow of Trinity College. In 1970 he became a QC. From 1975 to 1977 Lauterpacht served as legal advisor to the Australian Department of Foreign Affairs.

Lauterpacht was also an active academic at Cambridge University, where he was successively Lecturer, Reader and Honorary Professor. In 1983 the Research Centre for International Law was founded by Lauterpacht at Cambridge, and he was its director until 1995. In 1996 the Centre was renamed the Lauterpacht Centre in honour of Sir Elihu and his father, Sir Hersch.

He continued to teach courses at the London School of Economics (in 1995) and The Hague Academy of International Law (1996).

During his time at the Bar, he was a member of 20 Essex Street Barristers' Chambers, before retiring late in 2015.

== International Court of Justice ==
During his career Lauterpacht appeared before the International Court of Justice in various cases — including:

- Timor Leste v. Australia (The Case Concerning Questions relating to the Seizure and Detention of Certain Documents and Data),
- Liechtenstein v. Guatemala (the Nottebohm case),
- the North Sea Continental Shelf cases,
- Belgium v. Spain (Barcelona Traction case),
- Australia v. France (the Nuclear Tests case),
- New Zealand v. France (1995 request for an examination following the Nuclear Tests case),
- Pakistan v. India (Atlantique Incident case),
- El Salvador v. Honduras,
- Botswana v. Namibia (Kasikili case),
- Mexico v. United States (the Avena case),
- Qatar v. Bahrain case,
- Malaysia v. Indonesia (a territorial dispute over Sipadan and Ligitan islands),
- Bosnia and Herzegovina v. Serbia and Montenegro (Application of the Genocide Convention - he was a judge ad hoc for Bosnia).

== Honours ==
- 1989, appointed Commander of the Order of the British Empire (CBE) in the New Year Honours.
- 1994, appointed an Honorary Professor of International Law at Cambridge University.
- 1997, the Research Centre for International Law at was renamed to Lauterpacht Research Centre for International Law in honour of both Sir Elihu Lauterpacht and his father Sir Hersch Lauterpacht to mark their contribution to the research of international law at the University of Cambridge.
- 1998, knighted in the Queen's Birthday Honours.

== Lectures ==
- The Role of the International Judge in the Lecture Series of the United Nations Audiovisual Library of International Law.
