= L. F. L. Oppenheim =

German legal scholar (1858–1919)

- Born: Lassa Francis Lawrence Oppenheim; 30 March 1858; Windecken, Electorate of Hesse
- Died: 19 October 1919 (aged 61); Cambridge, England, United Kingdom
- Citizenship: British from 1900
- Title: Whewell Professor of International Law
- Predecessor: John Westlake
- Successor: Alexander Pearce Higgins
- Spouse: Elizabeth Alexander (m. 1902–1919)

Academic background
- Education: University of Göttingen (PhD); University of Leipzig; University of Freiburg (Hab.)
- Doctoral advisor: Heinrich Thöl
- Other advisors: Caspar Blüntschli, Karl Binding

Academic work
- Discipline: Public international law
- Institutions: University of Basel; University of Cambridge
- Notable works: International Law: A Treatise (1905)

Lassa Francis Lawrence Oppenheim (30 March 1858 – 7 October 1919) was a German jurist. He has been characterized as the father of the modern discipline of international law, especially the hard legal positivist school of thought. His two-volume International Law: A Treatise has influenced international law. He inspired Joseph Raz and Prosper Weil.

== Birth, life, and career in Germany ==
Oppenheim was born in Windecken near the Free City of Frankfurt, German Confederation, the son of a Jewish horse trader, and educated at the Universities of Berlin, Göttingen and Heidelberg.

In 1881, he obtained his PhD of Law at the University of Göttingen. In 1883, he went to the University of Leipzig, where he became a disciple of the renowned Professor of Criminal Law Karl Binding. In 1885 he completed his Habilitation at the University of Freiburg and taught criminal law there until he moved to the University of Basel in 1892. In Basel, Oppenheim still worked on criminal law. It was not until he moved to the United Kingdom that he turned from criminal law to international law.

== Life and career in the United Kingdom ==
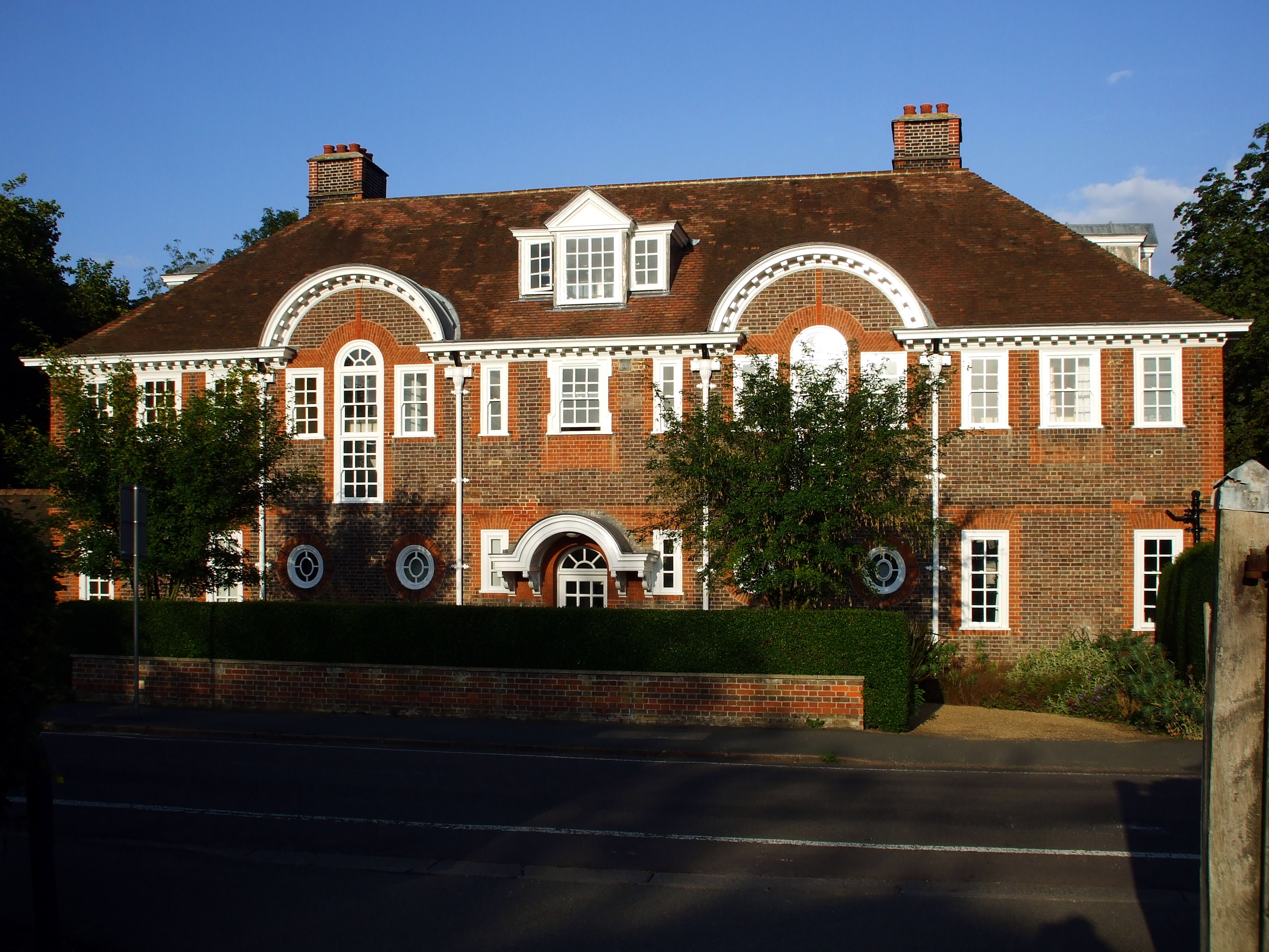
His home in Cambridge, Whewell House, 62 Grange Road

Oppenheim moved to the United Kingdom in 1895, acquiring citizenship in 1900, and lived there until his death.

He first lectured at the London School of Economics and in 1908 became the Whewell Professor of International Law in the University of Cambridge. He is the author of the internationally renowned International Law: A Treatise, the first edition of which was published in 1905–1906.

The eighth edition of the part on peace was edited by Sir Hersch Lauterpacht; the ninth and most recent edition of the same part was co-edited by Sir Robert Yewdall Jennings and Sir Arthur Watts. The work is still considered a standard text of international Law.

== Works ==
=== Books and monographs ===
- Die Rechtsbeugungsverbrechen des Deutschen Reichsstrafgesetzbuches (1886)
- Die Nebenklage im deutschen Strafprozess (1889)
- Zur Lehre von der Untersuchungshaft (1889)
- Die Objekte des Verbrechens (1894)
- Das Gewissen (1898)
- International Law: volume I, Peace (1905; second edition, 1912), volume II, War and Neutrality, (1906; second edition, 1912)
- International Incidents (Cambridge University Press 1909); second edition, 1911)
- The Future of International Law. Translated by John Pawley Bate. Oxford: Clarendon Press. 1914. (in German, 1911)
- Lassa Oppenheim, Ronald Roxburgh, et al., International Law: A Treatise (two volumes, 1918)
- The Panama Canal Conflict. Cambridge University Press. 1913.
- The League of Nations and its Problems Collection of three lectures. Longmans, Green and Co. 1919.

=== Other works ===
- The Science of International Law: Its Task and Method, American Journal of International Law, vol. ii, pp. 313–56 (1908)

=== Edited by Oppenheim ===
- The Collected Papers of John Westlake on Public International Law (Cambridge University Press 1914)
- Co-editor, Zeitschrift für Völkerrecht, Vols. i–viii (1906–14)
- Contributions to International Law and Diplomacy (Longmans, Green and Co.)
