= Robert Yewdall Jennings =

English academic (1913–2004)

His Excellency Sir Robert Jennings QC

President of the International Court of Justice
- In office 1991–1994
- Preceded by: José María Ruda
- Succeeded by: Mohammed Bedjaoui

Judge of the International Court of Justice
- In office 1982–1995
- Preceded by: Sir Humphrey Waldock
- Succeeded by: Dame Rosalyn Higgins

Whewell Professor of International Law
- In office 1955–1982
- Preceded by: Sir Hersch Lauterpacht
- Succeeded by: Derek Bowett

Personal details
- Born: Robert Yewdall Jennings; 19 October 1913 Idle, West Yorkshire
- Died: 4 August 2004 (aged 90)

Academic background
- Education: Belle Vue Grammar School
- Alma mater: University of Cambridge (BA, LLB)

Academic work
- Discipline: Public international law
- Institutions: University of Cambridge
- Notable works: The Acquisition of Territory in International Law; Oppenheim's International Law, 9th edition

Sir Robert Yewdall Jennings QC (19 October 1913 – 4 August 2004) was Whewell Professor of International Law at Cambridge University from 1955 to 1982 and a Judge of the International Court of Justice (ICJ) from 1982. He served as President of the ICJ between 1991 and 1994 before he resigned from the Court on 10 July 1995.

== Birth and education ==
Jennings was born in Yorkshire, England, in the village of Idle where his father worked at a small manufacturing firm and his mother was a mill weaver.

Educated at the local village school in Idle, and later at Belle Vue Grammar School in Bradford, he went on to study history at Downing College, Cambridge. After he gained an upper first class degree, the award of a Squire Law scholarship and some assistance from his local authority provided the financial support that enabled him to proceed to study Law. Again, Jennings excelled, gaining first class honours in both parts of the Cambridge Law Tripos and in the postgraduate LLB degree, and being awarded the Whewell and Cassell scholarships. He later received his LL.B. from the same institution and then won the Joseph Hodges Choate Memorial Fellowship to Harvard University.

== Career ==
After Harvard, Jennings worked at an assistant lectureship at the London School of Economics. From 1939 on, he was a Fellow of Jesus College, Cambridge, and was awarded the Hudson Medal of the American Society of International Law. The University of Leicester named a chair after him; Malcolm Shaw held the Chair until 2011. Katja Ziegler is the current Sir Robert Jennings Professor of International Law. In 1955 he succeeded Sir Hersch Lauterpacht as Whewell Professor of International Law, the post which he held until 1982.

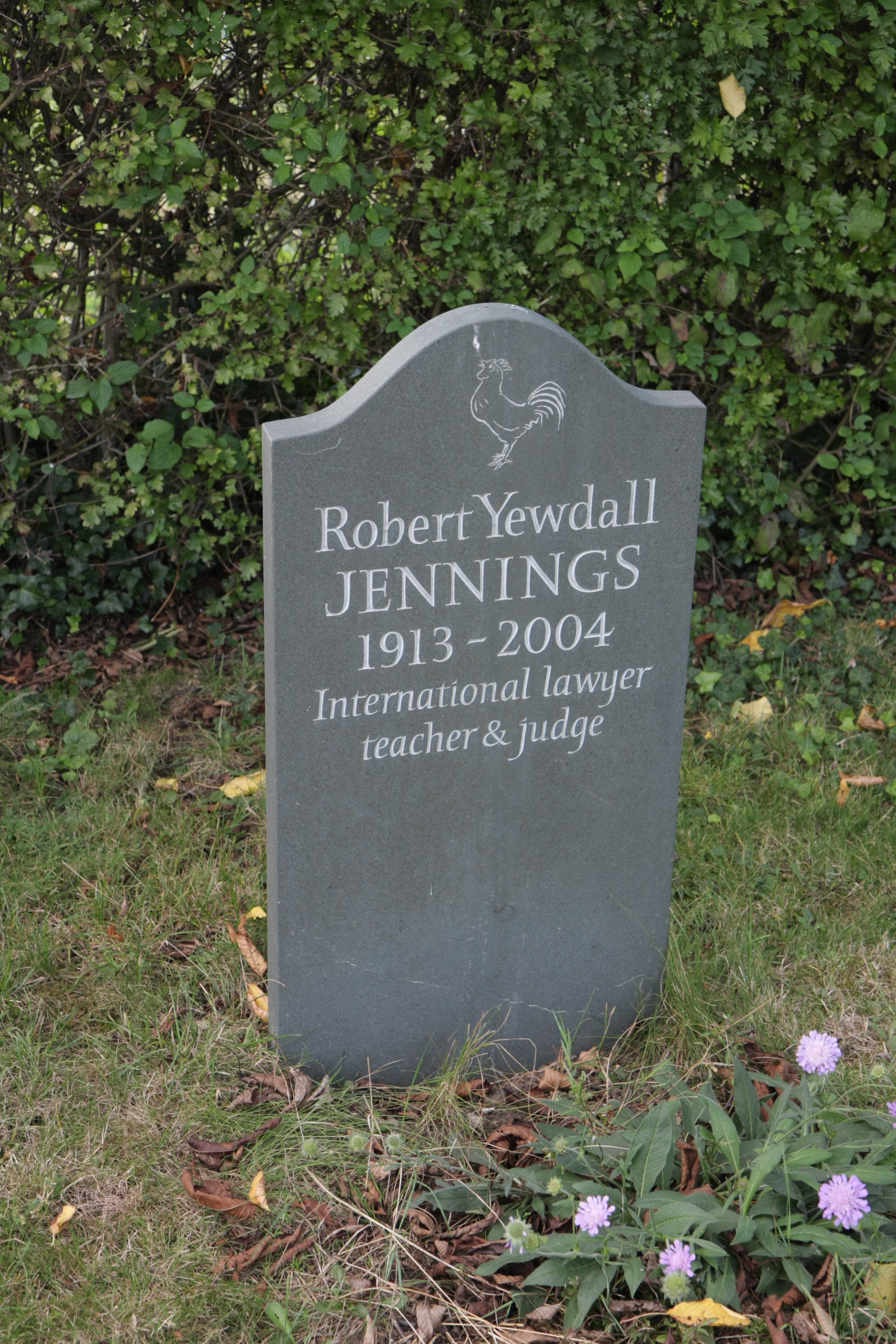
Gravestone of Sir Robert Yewdall Jennings

He served in the Intelligence Corps during the Second World War.

He was knighted in 1982. He was a president of the Institut de droit international, received honorary doctorates from the universities of Hull, Leicester and the Saarland, as well as Oxford and Cambridge.

He was an editor of the British Yearbook of International Law; co-authored (with Sir Arthur Watts) 9th edition of Oppenheim's International Law. His other important publications include The Acquisition of Territory in International Law.

== Personal life ==
He married Christine Bennett (died 2022); they had one son and two daughters. Outside of his legal field, he enjoyed spending time in the Lake District from a small cottage in Eskdale near Scafell Pike, spending time gardening and rebuilding dry-stone walls.

Sir Robert Yewdall Jennings died of natural causes on 4 August 2004 (aged 90) and was buried in Cambridgeshire, England.

== See also ==
- Judges of the International Court of Justice
- Whewell Professorship of International Law
