= Thomas Padmore =

British civil servant (1909–1996)

Sir Thomas Padmore GCB (23 April 1909 – 9 February 1996) was a British civil servant who served as Permanent Secretary to the Treasury and Second Secretary 1952–62 and Permanent Secretary, Ministry of Transport 1962–68. He was also Chairman of the Royal Philharmonic Orchestra and Chairman of the Handel Opera Society.

== Biography ==
Sir Thomas Padmore was born in Sheffield on 9 April 1909 into a family of traders. His grandfather left school at the age of 10 and worked his way up Thomas Ward Ltd, steel merchants. His father, also Thomas, wanted his son to go into the firm after school, and it was young Thomas's headmaster who insisted, against the family's wishes, that he go to university.

Padmore studied at Queens' College, Cambridge as a College Scholar and took Firsts in French and German. His Civil Service career started in 1931 in the Inland Revenue from which he moved, after two years, to the Treasury. He stayed there for twenty-eight years and rose rapidly to reach full Permanent Secretary rank at the unusually early age of 42. In 1952, he became Second Secretary of the Treasury, in charge of personnel and staff management and then of finance and supply, and, from 1962 until his retirement in 1968, he was Permanent Secretary to the Ministry of Transport.

Padmore tackled the occasional difficulties of his career — notably the frustration when a proposed appointment to the post of Cabinet Secretary did not materialise and, later, a well-publicised disagreement with an incoming Minister of Transport — with humour and stoicism. Characteristically, he refused to waste time on the past and moved on with vigour and enthusiasm to the next task. Described as one of the great Civil Servants of the post-war years, he was an outstanding administrator and manager, an understanding and tolerant man of absolute honesty and integrity with a brilliant mind. His account of his particular professional aptitude was characteristically straightforward and informal: "Generally speaking, I am not an ideas merchant. What I can claim to have done many times in my life is to have spotted quicker than most that someone else had produced an idea that was a fizzer, and to have seized it for my own and shoved it through".

He was appointed CB 1947, KCB 1953, GCB 1965.

== Personal life ==
Thomas Padmore enjoyed two long and happy marriages. His personal life was overshadowed for some years by the tragic death of his only son from cancer in 1956, followed in 1963 by that of his first wife, Alice. He later married a Treasury colleague, Rosalind Culhane, and celebrated with her in 1995 his second silver wedding. He left two daughters and two grandchildren in whom he took immense pride.

Other joys in his life were gardening and music; he took up the violin in middle age and became a skilled amateur violinist, playing in regular quartet sessions with friends and family. An avid listener to music, especially Mozart, during his retirement he served as Chairman of the Royal Philharmonic Orchestra, of the Edinburgh Rehearsal Orchestra, and of the Handel Opera Society.

He died in London on 9 February 1996.
