= Derek Bowett =

International lawyer and academic

Sir Derek Bowett CBE QC FBA

Whewell Professor of International Law
- In office 1981–1992
- Preceded by: Sir Robert Jennings
- Succeeded by: James Crawford

President of Queens' College, Cambridge
- In office 1970–1982
- Preceded by: Sir Arthur Armitage
- Succeeded by: The Lord Oxburgh

Personal details
- Born: Derek William Bowett Manchester
- Died: 23 May 2009 (aged 82)
- Spouse: Betty Northall
- Relations: 3

Military service
- Allegiance: United Kingdom
- Branch/service: Royal Navy
- Years of service: 1944–1948

Academic background
- Education: William Hulme's Grammar School
- Alma mater: Downing College, Cambridge (LLB); University of Manchester (PhD)
- Thesis: Self-Defence in International Law (1958)
- Doctoral advisor: Ben Wortley
- Other advisor: Hersch Lauterpacht

Academic work
- Discipline: Public international law
- Institutions: Queens' College, Cambridge

Sir Derek William Bowett, CBE, QC, FBA (20 April 1927 – 23 May 2009) was an international lawyer and academic. He was appointed Whewell Professor of International Law in 1981 and was President of Queens' College, Cambridge 1970–1982.

== Early life and education ==
Raised near Manchester Bowett was a chorister at Manchester Cathedral, attended William Hulme's Grammar School and joined the Royal Navy at 18 years of age in 1945. After demobilisation he studied law at Downing College, Cambridge. After gaining a first class degree Bowett was encouraged to continue his studies by Hersch Lauterpacht the then Whewell Professor of International Law.

His PhD (1958) was on "Self Defence in International Law".

He was highly esteemed as a lawyer: J. P. Gardner (Director of the British Institute of International and Comparative Law) wrote in the Introduction to Bowett's book International Court of Justice (1997), that his "….experience of international litigation is unrivalled…”

== Career ==
=== Work in Beirut and for Egypt ===
He spent 1966–1968 in Beirut as Legal Adviser to the United Nations Relief and Works Agency for Palestinian Refugees (UNRWA). There he experienced, from a distance, the Six Day War and, much more directly, its effects in terms of the great increase in the number of refugees falling under UNRWA's remit. It coloured his attitude to the Middle East conflict thereafter: his rooms at Queens had on the walls photos of some of those refugees. In later years he successfully represented Egypt against Israel in a significant territorial dispute.

=== Work in Somalia ===
In 1964 while a Fellow of Queens' he was asked by the newly independent Government of Somalia to advise it on its territorial disputes with Ethiopia and Kenya. This was his first international law brief. On arrival in Mogadishu he was asked to draft a diplomatic note closing the British Embassy, on the basis that Britain was refusing to give effect to a plebiscite in the Northern Frontier District of Kenya, which had voted by a large majority to reunite with Somalia. Lacking experience in rupturing diplomatic relations, he asked to see the standard work, Satow's Guide to Diplomatic Practice. But the Somali Foreign Ministry had no books of any kind, and he was told to borrow it from the British Embassy. The book was duly returned, with a note of thanks and another, more formal, note giving the Ambassador four days to leave. It seems to have been a case of persona non grata sed liber gratus.

== Personal life ==
While in his first job as a university lecturer at Manchester University, Bowett shared a house with three young women, including a "statuesque blonde with a sharp sense of humour", Betty Northall. Derek and Betty were married in 1953. Bowett was an avid tennis player and a big fan of Roger Federer.

His son is Adam Bowett, the expert on Chippendale furniture.

== Honours ==
- – Commander, Order of the British Empire (UK), 1983
- – Commander, Order of the Dannebrog (Denmark), 1993
- – Grand Cross, Civil Order, Jose Cecilio del Valle (Honduras), 1993
- – Knight Commander, Order of the British Empire (UK), 1998
- – Commander, Order of the White Double Cross (Slovakia), 2000

Academic offices
Preceded by Sir Arthur Armitage	President of Queens' College, Cambridge; 1970–1982	Succeeded by Lord Oxburgh
