= Whewell Professor of International Law =

Professorship at the University of Cambridge

The Whewell Professorship of International Law is a professorship in the University of Cambridge.

The Professorship was established in 1868 by the will of the 19th-century scientist and moral philosopher, William Whewell, with a view to devising "such measures as may tend to diminish the causes of war and finally to extinguish war between nations".

== Incumbents of the Whewell Professorship of International Law ==
Holders of the Whewell chair include four judges of the International Court of Justice.

- 1869: Sir William Vernon Harcourt
- 1887: Sir Henry James Sumner Maine
- 1888: John Westlake
- 1908: L. F. L. Oppenheim
- 1920: Alexander Pearce Higgins
- 1935: Lord Arnold McNair
- 1938: Sir Hersch Lauterpacht
- 1955: Sir Robert Jennings
- 1981: Sir Derek Bowett
- 1992: Prof James Crawford
- 2016: Prof Eyal Benvenisti
- From 2024: Prof Jan Klabbers

== See also ==
- List of Professorships at the University of Cambridge
