= Winchester Reading Prize =

The Winchester Reading Prize, endowed in 1867 by John Noble, is awarded at the University of Cambridge for the public reading of passages:

- of classical English Prose and Poetry;
- of the Old and New Testament and the English Liturgy; and
- of a work or portion of a work of some standard English Divine.
