= Lauterpacht Centre for International Law =

Law faculty at the University of Cambridge

Coordinates: 52.2019°N 0.1038°E

The Lauterpacht Centre for International Law (LCIL) at the Faculty of Law, University of Cambridge, England, was founded in 1983 by Sir Elihu Lauterpacht under the name The Research Centre for International Law. It was renamed in 1997 "to honour the achievements of his father Sir Hersch Lauterpacht and himself".

The Centre's objectives are: to serve as a discussion forum for current issues by organising seminars, lectures and meetings aimed at developing an understanding of international law; to promote research and the publication of core research material; to provide, in Cambridge, an intellectual home for visiting researchers of international law from around the world who wish to pursue their own research in an atmosphere that is stimulating and congenial to the generation and exchange of ideas; to provide education and training programmes of the highest quality; to maintain a library of archival and source materials relating to international law.

== List of directors ==
- Sir Elihu Lauterpacht (1985–1995)
- John Dugard (1995–1997)
- James Crawford (1997–2003)
- Daniel Bethlehem QC (2003–2006)
- Charlotte Ku (October 2006–March 2007)
- James Crawford (April 2007–September 2010)
- Marc Weller (October 2010–2016)
- Eyal Benvenisti (2016–2023)
- Sandesh Sivakumaran (2023–present)
