= Hersch Lauterpacht =

Polish-British judge (1897–1960)

His Excellency Sir Hersch Lauterpacht QC

Judge of the International Court of Justice
- In office 1955–1960
- Preceded by: The Lord McNair
- Succeeded by: Sir Gerald Fitzmaurice

Whewell Professor of International Law
- In office 1938–1955
- Preceded by: The Lord McNair
- Succeeded by: Sir Robert Jennings

Personal details
- Born: Hersch Lauterpacht; 16 August 1897 Żółkiew, Kingdom of Galicia and Lodomeria, Austria-Hungary (modern-day Zhovkva, Lviv Oblast, Ukraine)
- Died: 8 May 1960 (aged 62) London, United Kingdom

Academic background
- Education: University of Lemberg; London School of Economics (LLD)
- Thesis: Private law analogies in international law with special reference to international arbitration (1925)
- Doctoral advisor: Arnold McNair

Academic work
- Discipline: Public international law
- Institutions: University of Cambridge
- Doctoral students: D. P. O'Connell
- Notable students: Derek Bowett
- Notable works: The Function of Law in the International Community (1933); An International Bill of the Rights of Man (1945); Recognition in International Law (1947); The Development of International Law by the International Court (1958)

Sir Hersch Lauterpacht QC (16 August 1897 – 8 May 1960) was a British international lawyer, human rights activist, and judge at the International Court of Justice.

== Biography ==
Hersch Lauterpacht was born on 16 August 1897 to a Jewish family in the small town of Żółkiew, in the Austro-Hungarian Empire, near Lemberg (now Lviv), the capital of East Galicia. In 1911 his family moved to Lemberg. He has two siblings. His father was a timber merchant.

In 1915 he enrolled in the law school of the University of Lemberg; it is not clear whether he graduated. Lauterpacht himself later wrote that he had not been able to take the final examinations "because the university has been closed to Jews in Eastern Galicia". He then moved to Vienna, where he was influenced by Hans Kelsen. He moved to London, where he undertook a PhD in international law. He obtained a PhD degree from the London School of Economics in 1925, writing his dissertation under the supervision of Arnold McNair on Private Law Analogies in International Law, which was published in 1927.

His 1933 book The Function of Law in the International Community has been characterized as arguably his most influential.

By 1937 he had written several books on international law. He assisted in the prosecution of the defendants at the Nuremberg trials—helping to draft the British prosecutor's (Hartley Shawcross) speech. He was a member of the British delegation in two International Court of Justice cases: the Corfu Channel case (1948) and the Anglo-Iranian Oil Co. case (1951).

Lauterpacht was invited in 1942 by the American Jewish Committee to author a book on the International Law of Human Rights.

His parents and siblings were murdered by the Nazis in August 1942 during the Nazi occupation of Lviv.

Lauterpacht was a member of the United Nations' International Law Commission from 1952 to 1954 and a Judge of the International Court of Justice from 1955 to 1960. In the words of former ICJ President Stephen M. Schwebel, Judge Sir Hersch Lauterpacht's "attainments are unsurpassed by any international lawyer of this century [...] he taught and wrote with unmatched distinction". Hersch's writings and (concurring and dissenting) opinions continue, nearly 50 years after his death, to be cited frequently in briefs, judgments, and advisory opinions of the World Court. He famously said that "international law is at the vanishing point of law".

The Lauterpacht Centre for International Law at the University of Cambridge is named after him and his son, Sir Elihu Lauterpacht, CBE, QC, who founded the centre and was its first director; Elihu remained actively involved in its work as Director Emeritus and Honorary Professor of International Law until his death in February 2017.

Samuel Moyn has suggested that Hersch was one of the few international lawyers actively campaigning for human rights in the late 1940s, and that he had "denounced the Universal Declaration as a shameful defeat of the ideals it grandly proclaimed". In the aftermath of the Holocaust, Lauterpacht's thinking also included the question of how this unpreceded event could be properly met by an international law that was based on established rules and precedents. When asked about the possibilities for the newly established state of Israel to claim citizenship for deceased Jewish victims of the Holocaust, Lauterpacht ambivalently stated that, although this was not possible according to the present state of international law, it would only be an extraordinary reaction to an unprecedented event in history.

In 1948, Lauterpacht was asked by Yishuv diplomats to consider the legal basis for Israel's independence or write a declaration of independence for Israel. By May 1948, Lauterpacht had produced a two-part document that amounted to a declaration of independence. Some of Lauterpacht's draft was incorporated into what would ultimately become the ultimate draft of Israel's Declaration of Independence.

== Personal life ==
He was married to Rachel Lauterpacht and was the father of Elihu Lauterpacht.

== Major works ==
- Private Law Sources and Analogies of International Law, London, 1927;
- The Function of Law in the International Community, Oxford, 1933;
- An International Bill of the Rights of Man, Oxford, 1945;
- Recognition in International Law, Cambridge, 1947;
- The Development of International Law by the International Court, London, 1958;
- Oppenheim's International Law, Vol. 1, 8th ed., 1958;
- Sir Gerald Fitzmaurice, Hersch Lauterpacht – The Scholar as Judge, Part I. 37 British Yearbook of International Law 1-72, 1961; Part II, 38 British Yearbook of International Law 1-84, 1962; Part III, 39 British Yearbook of International Law 133–189, 1963
- Annual Digest and Reports of Public International Law Cases, Vols. 1–16, subsequently continued as International Law Reports, Vols. 17–24
- International Law – The Collected Papers of Hersch Lauterpacht, Vol.5, Edited by Elihu Lauterpacht (Cambridge 2004) as reviewed by H.E. Former ICJ President Stephen M. Schwebel, in 99 American Journal of International Law 726-729 (2005)
- The Life of Hersch Lauterpacht (Cambridge November 2010) by Elihu Lauterpacht and ILR Announcement as reviewed by H.E. Former ICJ President Schwebel

== See also ==
- Whewell Professorship of International Law
