= Pierantoni =

Pierantoni is a surname. Notable people with this surname include:

- Giovanni Giacomo Pierantoni (17th century), Italian mathematician
- Grazia Pierantoni-Mancini (1841-1843–1915), Italian writer and the wife of Augusto Pierantoni
- Augusto Pierantoni (1840–1911), Italian jurist, professor and politician in the Kingdom of Italy
- Piero Pierantoni Cámpora (1932–2009), Peruvian politician
