= Henri Rolin =

Belgian politician (1891–1973)

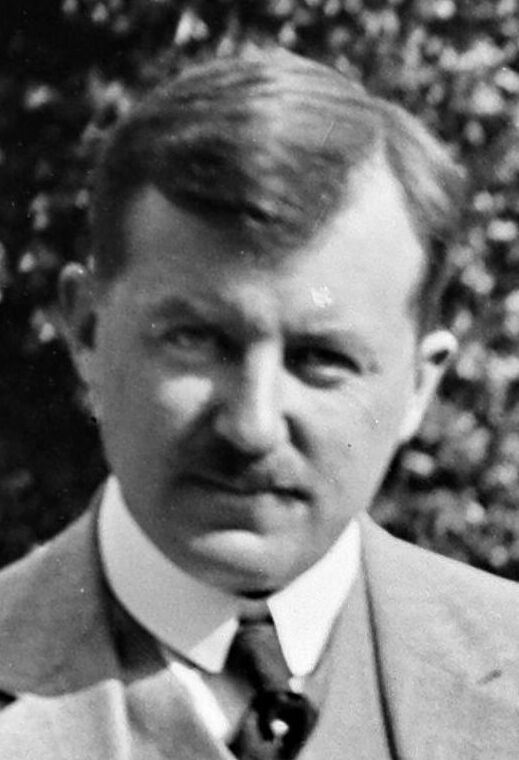
- Henri Rolin in Locarno, 7/10/1925

Henri Marthe Sylvie Rolin (Ghent, 3 May 1891 – Paris, 20 April 1973) was a Lawyer, Diplomat, Senator, President of the Belgian Senate, Minister, Minister of State, Judge then President of the European Court of Human Rights, President of the Institute of International Law, and Professor at the Free University of Brussels.

== The Rolin family ==
The Rolin family of Belgium descended from Nicolas Rolin (1376-1462), Chancellor of the Dukes of Burgundy.

Henri Rolin came from a branch of this family which had settled in Ghent and already included many lawyers.

His grandfather was Hippolyte Rolin (1804-1888), a barrister who defended the Orangists before the Brussels Court. He also had a political career as a municipal councillor, alderman, president of the Liberal Association of Ghent, and later as Minister of Public Works from 1848 to 1850. He married the daughter of Jean-Baptiste Hellebaut, a renowned professor and lawyer. The couple had 18 children.

His father, Albéric Rolin (1843-1937), was a doctor of law, a barrister and President of the Ghent Bar. He also taught at the University of Ghent and was a member and president of the Institute of International Law. He wrote several works on international law, modern law, and war.

His uncle, Gustave Rolin-Jaequemyns (1835–1902), founded the Institute of International Law, and the Journal of International Law and Comparative Legislation. He also served as a member of the House of Representatives and as Minister of Internal Affairs.

His cousin, Edouard Rolin-Jaequemyns (1863-1936), son of Gustave Rolin-Jaequemyns, was Minister of Internal Affairs, a member of the Permanent Court of International Justice, and President of the Institute of International Law.

Henri was the sixth of eight children. His siblings were Marguerite Rolin (1882-1968), Germaine Rolin (1883-1965), Hippolyte-Charles Rolin (1885-1914), Louis Rolin (1886-1915), Albéric Rolin (1888-1954), Gustave-Marc Rolin (1892-1918) and Lucie Rolin (1894-1921).

Their mother, Sylvie Borreman (8 October 1853 – 29 December 1937), was a woman of strong character, devoted to the education of her children. She instilled in them values such as family solidarity and a sense of duty. They were raised in the Christian faith while belonging to a liberal milieu, which was rare at the time.

== First World War ==
The five brothers enlisted in the army at the start of the war. Three of them died at the front: Hippolyte Rolin, a lieutenant, died in the early days of the war; Louis Rolin, a soldier, died in 1915; and Gustave Rolin, a captain, was seriously wounded in the spine and nearly completely paralysed. Henri, who had been in the same unit as his brother since the beginning of 1918, watched over him until he died on 22 May 1918.

In a letter to his parents, Henri expressed his grief and, addressing his mother, wrote: ‘You cannot imagine how much I loved and admired him, truly, truly as much as you did, and as much as if I had been his father and mother.’

On 10 November 1918, the Belgian army reached the river Scheldt, and an offensive was planned for the following day. Rolin received a supply of poison gas shells. His blood ran cold and he went to see his commander, telling him that he could not carry out the order. For his superior, the order had to be obeyed. Rolin demanded a written order from the general, who would take responsibility for it, as a condition for carrying out the shelling. The next day, 11 November, the armistice was announced, making the issue irrelevant.

Rolin was wounded three times and ended up as commander of the 18th Artillery Regiment. He was said to be distinguished by his exceptional ‘intelligence and courage’ and was presented as a model of patriotism. He lost his Christian faith but remained marked by spirituality. He considered the death of his brothers and his own survival arbitrary.

Tributes were paid to them, notably with the Rolin artillery barracks in Brussels (destroyed in 1993). The title of Baron was granted to their father by King Albert in 1921. After the Second World War, a class at the military academy was named in their honour.

In a letter to his elder sister Germaine, he expressed how proud he was of belonging to the family. He also said he was happy of the unexpected daily interactions the war had fostered, between people of different social classes.

== Marriage ==
On 19 May 1925, he married Thérèse Lambiotte (1898-1988). She was the daughter of Georges Lambiotte, who, together with his brothers Ludolphe and Auguste, founded and directed the Lambiotte factory in Prémery (Nièvre). The Lambiottes owned several carbonisation factories established by their father (Thérèse's grandfather), which they operated as a family business. Paul Hymans was Henri Rolin’s best man at the wedding. They had five daughters: Claude Rolin, Gabrielle Rolin, Cécile Rolin, Luce Rolin and Sylvie Rolin.

== Education and career ==
Henri Rolin studied at the Atheneum in Ghent and then at Ghent University. He obtained his doctorate in law (equivalent to a modern-day master's degree) on 20 October 1919. His thesis was devoted to the concept of law in Jean-Jacques Rousseau's Social Contract. It is worth noting that the University of Ghent was French-speaking when Rolin studied there; it only became Flemish-speaking later.

In 1919, after the war and before graduating, he accompanied Paul Hymans to the Paris conference that led to the Treaty of Versailles. He discovered, with some bitterness, that everything was a power struggle and not the implementation of the idealistic principles that inspired him. Concerned about the conditions imposed on the defeated nations, he showed great lucidity when he wrote to his father: ‘I fear that this peace will enshrine the rights of the victors, thus paving the way for another final war.’ He participated in preparing the Covenant of the League of Nations. As often thereafter, he contributed behind the scenes to drafting texts that others would later sign officially. He considered defining the rules governing the functioning of the League of Nations particularly important. He wanted it to remain an effective instrument capable of establishing peace. Encouraged by Paul Hymans, he founded the Belgian Union for the Defence of the League of Nations.

In 1924, he played an active role in preparing the Geneva Protocol (1924), which aimed to establish compulsory arbitration of conflicts by the League of Nations. The protocol was approved by vote on 2 October 1924 but never implemented because it was not ratified.

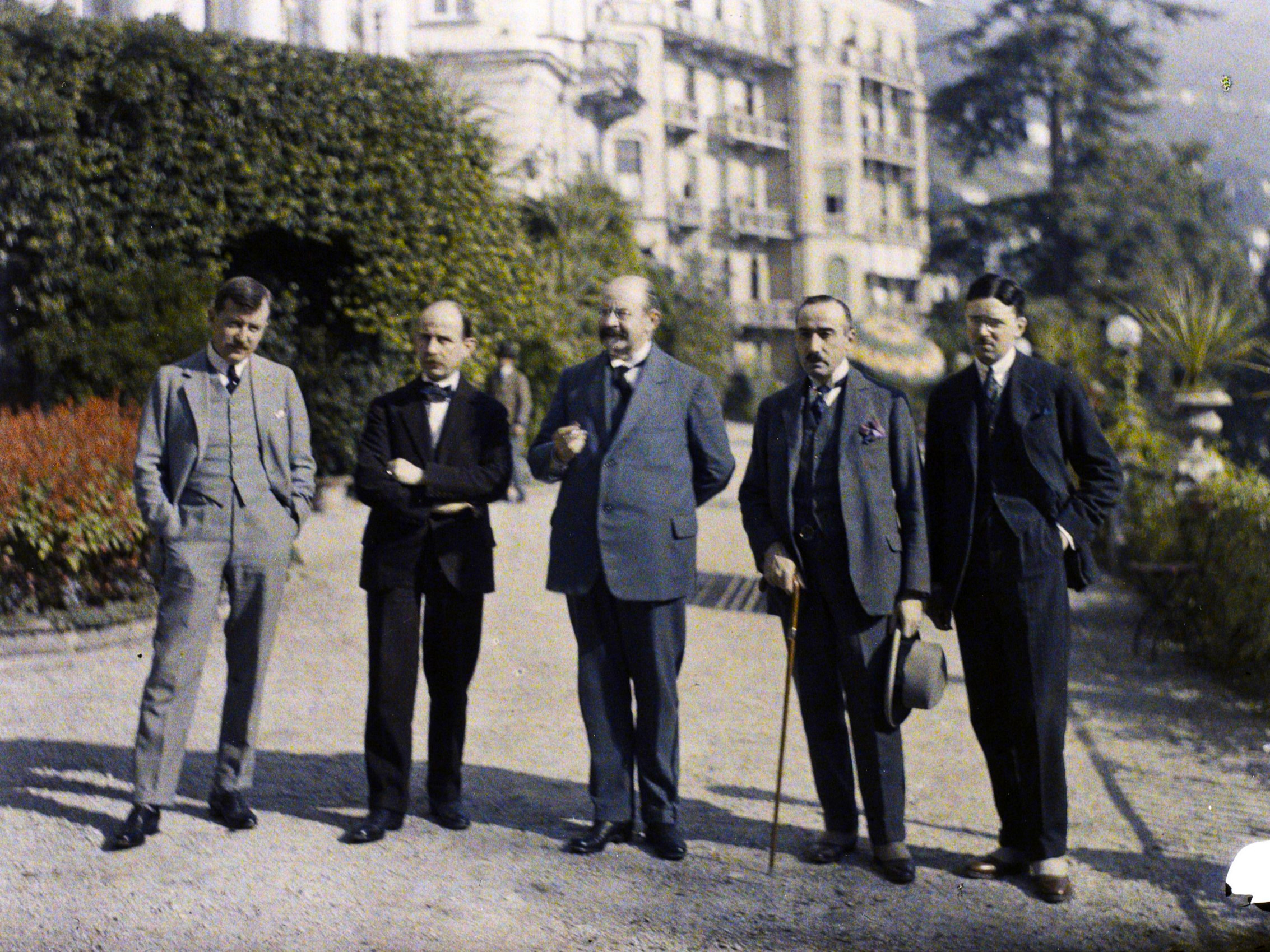
Autochrome of the Belgian delegation at the Locarno Treaties taken by Roger Dumas, 7 October 1925. Left to right: Henri Rolin, Joseph de Ruelle, Emile Vandervelde, Pierre van Zuylen and Ferdinand du Chastel

From 1925 to 1926, he was chief of staff to the Minister of Foreign Affairs, Emile Vandervelde (Socialist). In this capacity, he participated in drafting the Locarno Pact, signed on 16 October 1925.

From his family background that was progressive liberal, he became a socialist, partly at the request of others and partly out of loyalty to his own convictions rather than to the liberal movement, drifting from his beliefs. He started as a very moderate socialist but later supported more radical causes championed mainly by young people.

Rolin served as a senator for the Belgian Workers' Party (POB-BWP) and later for its successor, the Belgian Socialist Party (PSB-BSP), from 1932 until 1968.

Throughout the 1930s, faced with the rise of authoritarian regimes and the acts of aggression (Manchuria 1931, Ethiopia 1935, Rhineland 1936, Spain 1936, Sudetenland 1938,...), he fought in vain for the League of Nations to respond through the application of the sanctions provided for in treaties. He took a very firm stance against the Munich Agreement in 1938.

Convinced that Belgium would inevitably be drawn into a war between Germany and France, he opposed the government's “free-hand policy”, which sought to keep Belgium neutral and independent.

He became the legal advisor to the exiled Emperor Haile Selassie.

On 22 April 1939, he became a member of the Permanent Court of Arbitration in The Hague.

On 10 May 1940, following the German attack, he joined the army and fought in the 18 Days’ Campaign. Under the occupation, he was threatened with arrest by the Germans. He left for London in July 1941 and joined the Belgian government in exile, which appointed him Under-Secretary of State for National Defence until 1942. He then assisted with civil affairs in preparation for the arrival of the Allied armies and the government’s reestablishment in Belgium.

In June 1945, he was a delegate to the San Francisco Conference, which led to the creation of the United Nations. He was appointed chairman of the first commission (general provision) and, in this capacity, coordinated the drafting of the United Nations Charter, where his ideals can be recognised in the preamble ("We the peoples of the United Nations, determined to save succeeding generations from the scourge of war, ...") and Chapter I (Purposes of the United Nations). Between 1946 and 1957, he was a member of the Belgian delegation to the United Nations General Assembly on several occasions.

He also served briefly as Minister of Justice in March 1946 in a short-lived socialist government. From November 1947 to November 1949, he was elected President of the Senate. He was also chairman of the Senate Justice Committee and a member of the Foreign Affairs Committee. In 1948, he became Minister of State.

Between 1945 and 1951, he played an important role in the Royal Question, vigorously opposing, along with the Socialist Party, the return to power of King Leopold III.

In 1947, he founded, with among others Charles De Visscher, the Institute of International Relations, today the Egmont Institute.

In 1949, he was a delegate of Belgium to the Consultative Assembly of the Council of Europe. Together with René Cassin, he participated in drafting the European Convention on Human Rights, signed in Rome on 4 November 1950. He was responsible for drafting Article 1 of the Convention, which rendered it a text containing not only duties for States but also rights that could be invoked by individuals. In the same year, he served as elected judge at the European Court of Human Rights.

Between 1949 and 1952, he expressed his support for Jean Van Lierde, who refused military service and whose struggle led to the recognition of conscientious objector status in Belgium.

In 1952, at the International Court of Justice, Rolin successfully assisted Mohammad Mosaddegh, Prime Minister of Iran, against the British government, which was contesting Iran's nationalization of its oil resources (see below).

In January–February 1960, he played a key role in the Belgo-Congolese Round Table Conference: while the Belgian government proposed autonomy with a gradual transfer of responsibilities, the Congolese common front wanted total and immediate independence. Rolin considered this regrettable but inevitable and summed up what would become the final agreement in a now-famous phrase: ‘On 30th of June, Belgium must hand over all the keys to the Congo house, and it will be up to the Congolese to decide how to use them.’

From May 1965 to September 1968, he was Vice-President, and from 1968 to 1971 President of the European Court of Human Rights.

At the end of his life, he campaigned against the Vietnam War, judging the situation of the Vietnamese people unjust and undignified.

He used the law to promote the ideas he held dear and to defend causes where international law was violated. He said, ‘Today, I am obeying a moral imperative that I cannot resist: the defence of the law, the law that I cannot separate from peace, the law without which nothing lasting can be established, the law that is my religion, my profession, the only bread I want to eat.’

He took part in a debate on Belgian television on the evening of Wednesday, 18 April 1973. During the night between Thursday and Friday, he suffered a fatal heart attack while on a brief stay in Paris. His funeral was very simple: no music, no speeches. The contrast in the huge crowd was striking: senators in tailcoats on one side and young pacifist activists in jeans on the other. He is buried in the Ixelles cemetery. Walter Ganshof van der Meersch, Paul Foriers and many others created the association ‘Les amis d'Henri Rolin’ (Friends of Henri Rolin), now dissolved, of which Ganshof was president.

== Lawyer ==
Henri Rolin coined the legal term “erga omnes”.

Below is a summary of some of the legal cases in Henri Rolin's career.

=== Coppée Affair (1921) ===
The Coppée family, industrialists, was accused of supplying the Germans with explosives and machinery beyond the requisition orders. The proceedings were halted when the former Minister of War and Prime Minister de Broqueville intervened in 1921. Taking advantage of the situation, the Coppée sued the publishers responsible for the newspapers Le Soir (for which Henri Rolin was the legal advisor) and Le Peuple, as well as a socialist member of parliament, for damages allegedly caused by articles they considered libellous. At the opening of the trial, Rolin sought to demonstrate that the plaintiffs had been overly accommodating towards the Germans. He spoke of the military purpose behind the increase of activity, which included manufacturing explosives. He criticised de Broqueville for minimising the role of coal and benzene (which could be used to manufacture asphyxiating gas or fuel) in the arms industry. The Coppée claimed that they had been required to do so. Rolin responded by presenting a detailed account of their personal finances and commercial documents, stating that they had contributed more than requested. He criticised the Coppée for deliberately supplying more than was necessary. He asked a provocative question: ‘Who will say that these people should not be brought before the criminal court and pay like everyone else?’ During his closing arguments, the young lawyer declared that the figures presented by his colleague Renkin were false and requested that additional charges be brought. The civil case was ultimately suspended and the criminal investigation was reopened. The case ended with an acquittal in criminal court in 1924. In the civil case, however, a fine of 20 million francs was imposed on 12 February 1925.

=== The “Communist conspiracy” case (1923) ===
In 1923, fifteen members of the Communist Party of Belgium were prosecuted for actively participating in a spontaneous miners' strike over economic issues. The prosecution also accused them of demonstrations against the occupation of the Ruhr. The conspiracy theory was implausible as the Communist Party had only 517 members. Fifteen activists were brought before the Brussels Assize Court from 9 to 26 July 1923. Sixteen lawyers defended the accused. Some of them were very well known, while others were younger but very talented, including Paul-Henri Spaak, Jules Destrée, etc. Rolin defended Joseph Lesoil, a man who had volunteered for military service during the war. After the war, Lesoil was a delegate of the PCB at the Moscow Congress and a delegate of his party at the protest meeting held in Essen against the occupation of the Ruhr. During the trial, Rolin clearly distanced himself from his client's ideology on two occasions. The public prosecutor's office was represented by Attorney General Servais and Advocate General Cornil. Rolin analysed this notion of conspiracy from a strictly legal point of view and asked against whom in particular this conspiracy was directed. He also raised the question of the way decisions were made, as these points were not mentioned in the indictment nor in the pleadings. The trial ended with a general acquittal.

=== The Mossadegh case (1952) ===
The United Kingdom vs Iran concerned the nationalisation of the Anglo-Iranian Oil Company by Mossadegh's Iran, which was challenged by the British government before the International Court of Justice (ICJ). The Iranian government initially hired French lawyers, who withdrew a month before the pleadings following pressure from the British government. Iran then turned to Henri Rolin, who based the entire defence on the fact that the ICJ did not have jurisdiction to hear the case, as the dispute was between a state and a private company. In its ruling of 22 July 1952, the Court's judgment was that it had no jurisdiction in this matter by 9 votes to 5 (Iran's original contention).

=== Barcelona Traction case (1962-1970) ===
Barcelona Traction, Light and Power Company (BTLP) was a Canadian company that produced and supplied electricity in Spain. 88% of the shares were held by Belgians. During the Spanish Civil War (1936–1939), the Spanish government prohibited BTLP from transferring currency to pay the interest owed. After the company went bankrupt, the Belgian government filed an initial complaint with the ICJ on 23 September 1958, then withdrew it on 10 April 1961 in order to attempt negotiating. Following the failure of the negotiations, a new complaint was filed on 19 June 1962 and Henri Rolin was appointed to defend Belgium's interests. Spain argued that Belgium had no legal interest in the case, as BTLP was a Canadian company. The final judgement of 5 February 1970 ruled in Spain's favour.

== Professor at the Université Libre de Bruxelles ==
From 1930 onwards, he taught public international law at the ULB. He became a full professor in 1933 and subsequently taught several courses, all of which focused on international law. He became an honorary professor in 1961.

In the university’s administration, he was president of the Faculty of Law from 1947 to 1950 and served on the ULB's board of directors, initially as a substitute member from 1946 onwards.

He was invited to teach courses abroad. He gave the grand course at the Hague Academy of International Law twice: in 1927 on “the practice of international mandates” and in 1950 on “the principles of public international law”. He also taught at the law faculties of Paris, Toulouse, and Strasbourg.

== ULB Centre for International Law ==
The Centre for International Law was opened in 1964 at the initiative of Arthur Doucy. At the time, it was a research centre at ULB's Institute of Sociology. Henri Rolin was appointed its president. Upon his death, the centre changed its name to the “Henri Rolin Centre for International Law”. Since 2001, the centre has been exclusively affiliated with the Faculty of Law. The centre preserves Henri Rolin's archives and manages the Henri Rolin Fund, whose mission is to continue the teaching and ideals he promoted. Every three years, the fund awards the Henri Rolin Prize and organises the Henri Rolin Chair.

== Institute of International Law ==
The Institute of International Law was founded by his uncle, Gustave Rolin-Jaequemyns, in 1873 in Ghent. The institute's mission is to support efforts to eliminate sources of conflict in societies, codify public international law and promote human rights.

He first joined as an associate in 1924, then as a member in 1936, before becoming first vice-president in 1948 and finally president in 1963.

== Honours ==
- Baron: awarded following the First World War. He refused to use this title (unlike his brother Albéric and his cousin Edouard);
- Grand Cordon of the Order of Leopold in 1968;
- Honorary doctorate awarded by the University of Grenoble in 1949;
- A lecture hall at ULB’s law school is named after him.
- “Boulevard Henri Rolin” in Waterloo (Belgium) bears his name.
- A street of Teheran (Iran) is named “Professor Rolin street”
- Francqui Chair: invitation from the Francqui Foundation to teach at the University of Ghent.
- The Henri Rolin Prize for the best written observations is awarded each year by the Francophone Network of International Law during the Charles Rousseau International Law Moot Court Competition.
