= 2022 International Court of Justice judges election =

The 2022 International Court of Justice election was held on 4 November 2022 at the United Nations Headquarters in New York City. The General Assembly and the Security Council concurrently elected Leonardo Nemer Caldeira Brant for remainder of the nine-year term of office that had been held by Judge Antônio Cançado Trindade, who died in May, 2022.

Three candidates were nominated by the national groups of the Permanent Court of Arbitration: Professor Marcelo Kohen, from Argentina (nominated by seventeen national groups); Professor Paulo Borba Casella, from Brazil (nominated by the Brazilian national group); and Professor Leonardo Nemer Caldeira Brandt, from Brazil (nominated by six national groups).

In casual elections produced by the death of a judge, it is expected that the judge will be replaced by a national of a member of the same regional group (but not necessarily from the same country). In this case, the vacancy should have been filled by a national of a member of the Latin American and Caribbean Group in the United Nations. Therefore, the election of any of the three nominated candidates (Kohen, Casella, or Nemer) would have been in line with the established tradition.

== Background ==
The International Court of Justice (ICJ), based in The Hague, is one of the principal organs of the United Nations. Also known as the World Court, it adjudicates legal disputes between states, and provides advisory opinions on legal questions submitted by other UN organs or agencies.

The court consists of 15 judges, with five judges elected every three years. In the case of death or other vacancy, a judge is elected for the remainder of the term. Judges are required to be independent and impartial; they may not exercise any political or administrative function, and do not act as a representative of their home state.

Elections of members of the Court are governed by articles 2 through 15 of the Statute of the International Court of Justice.

== Election procedure ==
The General Assembly and the Security Council proceed, independently of one another, to elect five members of the Court.

To be elected, a candidate must obtain an absolute majority of votes both in the General Assembly and in the Security Council. The words “absolute majority” are interpreted as meaning a majority of all electors, whether or not they vote or are allowed to vote. Thus 97 votes constitute an absolute majority in the General Assembly and 8 votes constitute an absolute majority in the Security Council (with no distinction being made between permanent and non-permanent members of the Security Council).

== Candidates ==
=== Qualifications and the role of nationality ===
Article 2 of the Statute of the International Court of Justice provides that judges shall be elected "regardless of their nationality" and must possess "high moral character" as well as "the qualifications required in their respective countries for appointment to the highest judicial offices, or are jurisconsults of recognized competence in international law."

In casual elections called because of the death of a judge, there is a tradition that he will be replaced by a judge from the same region, but not necessarily from the same nationality. In 9 of the 20 causal elections celebrated so far, the successor judge has been of a different nationality of that of his predecessor. In this case, the election of any of the three nominated candidates would respect this tradition, as they are all GRULAC nationals: Marcelo Kohen is an Argentine national, Paulo Borba Casella is a Brazilian national, and Leonardo Nemer Caldeira Brandt is a Brazilian national.

=== Nomination procedure ===
Nominations of candidates for election to the ICJ are made by a group consisting of the members of the Permanent Court of Arbitration (PCA), designated by each State. For this purpose, members of the PCA act in "national groups" (i.e. all the PCA members from any individual state). In the case of UN member states not represented in the PCA, the state in question may select up to four individuals to be its "national group" for the purpose of nominating candidates to the ICJ.

Every "national group" may nominate up to four candidates, not more than two of whom shall be of their own nationality. For casual elections such as this one, it is extremely rare for national groups to nominate more than one candidate. Before making these nominations, each "national group" is recommended to consult its highest court of justice, its legal faculties and schools of law, and its national academies and national sections of international academies devoted to the study of law.

By a communication dated 22 June 2022, the Secretary-General of the United Nations invited the "national groups" to undertake the nomination of persons as judges of the ICJ.

=== 2022 nominees ===
Marcelo Kohen, Secretary-General of the Institut de Droit International and Full Professor at the Graduate Institute of International and Development Studies in Geneva, from Argentina, was the first nominated candidate.

Unusually, the Brazilian national group of the PCA nominated two candidates: Paulo Borba Casella, Full Professor at the University of São Paulo, and Leonardo Nemer Caldeira Brant, Full Professor at the University of Minas Gerais and Founder and President of the International Law Center (CEDIN) in Belo Horizonte, Brazil. The Brazilian Federal Government is supporting the candidacy of Professor Caldeira Brant.

Nevertheless, Casella still is and remains a candidate. Most recently, Professor Casella has released a statement to diplomatic sources reaffirming his candidacy. A few weeks before, Casella had denounced that he had been forced to interrupt his candidacy by the "express determination" of Jair Bolsonaro, "for ideological reasons and in retaliation to positions defended by me in articles and interviews".

As of 11 August 2022, the nominated candidates for the 2022 election are as follows:

Name	Nationality	Nominated by the "national group" of
(Argentina) Marcelo Kohen	Argentina	Seventeen national groups: Argentina, Austria, Colombia, Czechia, Estonia, Finland, France, Greece, Guatemala, Hungary, Italy, Latvia, Netherlands, Slovakia, Slovenia, Spain, Sweden.
(Brazil) Paulo Borba Casella	Brazil	One national group: Brazil.
(Brazil) Leonardo Nemer Caldeira Brant	Brazil	Six national groups: Brazil, Malta, Peru, Portugal, Singapore, Türkiye.
