= Rik Coolsaet =

Belgian academic

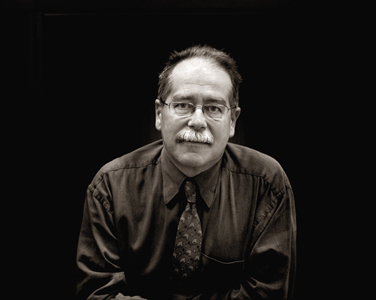
Rik Coolsaet

Rik Coolsaet (°Ixelles, 1 April 1951) is a Belgian academic. He is professor emeritus of International Relations at Ghent University (Belgium) and Honorary Fellow at Egmont Institute (Royal Institute for International Relations), Brussels.

== Official positions ==
He has held several official positions, such as deputy chief of the Cabinet of the Belgian Minister of Defence Guy Coeme and deputy chief of the Cabinet of the Minister of Foreign Affairs Willy Claes (1992–1995) where he was in charge for the contacts with the USA regarding the Rwandan genocide. From 2002 until 2009 he served as Director of the "Security & Global Governance" program at the Egmont Institute in Brussels.

== Publications ==
Coolsaet's research focuses on Belgian foreign policy, terrorism and radicalisation, security studies, and international relations.

In 1998, he published a comprehensive study on the history of Belgian foreign policy ("Belgium and its foreign policy 1830–1990", in Dutch and partly in French). The latest revised edition, released in September 2014, pursues this history until 2014 (published only in Dutch). Two other studies on Belgian foreign policy deal with Dutch-Belgian bilateral relations since 1945 (Nederland-België. De Belgisch-Nederlandse betrekkingen vanaf 1940, Boom, 2011, with Duco Hellema and Bart Stol) and with the history of the Ministry of Foreign Affairs: Les Affaires étrangères au service de l’Etat belge, de 1830 à nos jours (Mardaga, 2014) and, in Dutch, Buitenlandse Zaken in België. Geschiedenis van een ministerie, zijn diplomaten en zijn consuls van 1830 tot vandaag (Lannoo, 2014), with Vincent Dujardin and late Claude Roosens.

He was appointed a member of the original European Commission’s Expert Group on Violent Radicalisation (established 2006) and the subsequent European Network of Experts on Radicalisation (ENER). These groups have now been dismantled and replaced by the EU Knowledge Hub on Prevention of Radicalisation. Since 2003, he has been coordinating research on terrorism and radicalisation. Jihadi Terrorism and the Radicalisation Challenge. European and American Experiences was published by Ashgate in 2011. This volume was included in the 2012 "Top 150 Books on Terrorism and Counterterrorism", established by the academic journal Perspectives on Terrorism. His publications have focused on, inter alia, the impact of 9/11 on Europe, the push and pull factors behind the contemporary foreign fighters phenomenon, the origins and drawbacks of the concept of ‘radicalisation’, and the post-Daesh landscape. Some of this research was released by the Egmont InstituteEGMONT_–_The_Royal_Institute_for_International_Relations. His latest contributions on the topic have been published by Oxford University Press (2022) and Routledge (2024).

Coolsaet has also written extensively on international relations, mostly in Dutch. Between 2005 and 2016, his Macht en Waarden in de Wereldpolitiek ("Power and Values in World Politics", Academia Press) provided for a yearly overview of major trends in global politics. A 2008 publication, De geschiedenis van de wereld van morgen ("A History of Tomorrow’s World", Van Halewyck), analyzed long-term change patterns in international relations. Upon publication in February 2008, this book appeared on the Belgian bookshops' bestseller list for several months.

== Bibliography ==
- Coolsaet, Rik (2024), Voyage to America
- Coolsaet, Rik (2024), ‘Radicalisation’ and ‘countering radicalisation’: the emergence and expansion of a contentious concept. In: Joel Busher, Leena Malkki, and Sarah Marsden, The Routledge Handbook on Radicalisation and Countering Radicalisation. Routledge. ISBN 978-0-367-47684-7.
- Coolsaet, Rik (2022), When do individuals radicalize? In: Diego Muro, Tim Wilson (Eds), Contemporary Terrorism Studies. Oxford University Press. ISBN 978-0-19882956-0.
- Coolsaet, Rik, ed. (2010). Jihadi Terrorism and the Radicalisation Challenge: European and American Experiences (2nd ed.). Ashgate Publishing. ISBN 978-1-4094-2568-7.
- Coolsaet, Rik; Biscop, Sven (July 10, 2014). "Belgian Foreign Policy: in search of a new course". Egmont Institute Commentary (in English, French, and Dutch). Egmont Institute.
