= Leonardo Nemer Caldeira Brant =

Brazilian jurist and International Court of Justice judge

Judge of the International Court of Justice
- Incumbent
- Assumed office 4 November 2022
- Preceded by: Antônio Augusto Cançado Trindade

Personal details
- Born: 15 July 1966 (age 60) Belo Horizonte, Minas Gerais, Brazil
- Education: Federal University of Minas Gerais (LLB, LLM); Université Paris X - Nanterre (LLD)
- Website: Leonardo Nemer Caldeira Brant Website

Leonardo Nemer Caldeira Brant (born 15 July 1966) is a Brazilian jurist and International law scholar. He serves as judge of the International Court of Justice since 4 November 2022. He is also a professor at the Federal University of Minas Gerais (UFMG) and the founder of the International Law Center (CEDIN), in Belo Horizonte.

He was elected to the ICJ in the 2022 special election to complete the term of Antônio Augusto Cançado Trindade, after his passing.

== Education ==
Brant graduated from the School of Law, Federal University of Minas Gerais (UFMG), Belo Horizonte, in 1991. In the same year, he obtained a Diploma of Advanced Studies in Human Rights at the Inter-American Institute of Human Rights, San José, Costa Rica.

In 1993, he obtained a Master's Degree in International Law at the Federal University of Minas Gerais, with the thesis "The Right to Development as a Human Right". In the same year, he also obtained a Diploma of Advanced Studies at the Hague Academy of International Law, The Hague, Netherlands.

From 1996 to 2000, Brant studied at Université Paris X - Nanterre, France, where he obtained his PhD. He was awarded Doctor of International Law with the thesis "L'autorité de la chose jugée en Droit International Public". His thesis was awarded the "Prix du Ministère de la Recherche – Département Sciences de la Société de la République Française-Paris" (2000) and the "Prix de la Chancellerie de l'Académie de Paris" (2000). He also obtained a Diploma in Advanced Studies at the Institut International des Droits de L'Homme, Strasbourg, France (1996), and a Diploma in Advanced Studies at the United Nations Study Programme, Geneva, Switzerland (1997).

== Career ==
Brant started as a Professor of Public International Law and International Criminal Law at the Federal University of Minas Gerais, in Belo Horizonte, Brazil (1994–present). From 2000 to 2021, he was also a Tenured Professor of Public International Law at the Pontifícia Universidade Católica de Minas Gerais in Belo Horizonte.

From 2003 to 2004 he worked as a Legal Advisor (Juriste) at the Juridical Department of the International Court of Justice (ICJ), The Hague.

In 2005, Brant founded the Brazilian International Law Center (CEDIN), a research center specialized in International law, Humanitarian law, International criminal law and International Security. CEDIN and its associates have held important international events such as Congresses and Seminars. Furthermore, the Center has coordinated several profound studies on specific areas of International Law.

Brant also founded the Brazilian Yearbook of International Law (Anuário Brasileiro de Direito Internacional) in 2006. He is the Chief Editor of the periodical, published in several foreign languages and distributed to the largest and most relevant universities and international academic centers. Its main goal is to establish an annual publication engaged in the promotion and consolidation of the Latin-American view of International Law.

In 2007 Brant worked at Université Caen Basse-Normandie, France, as a visiting professor. In 2009, also as a visiting professor at the Institut des Hautes Études Internationales, he taught at the Université Panthéon Assas Paris II, France. In the same year, he was a Visiting Senior Researcher at the Lauterpacht Centre for International Law, Cambridge University, United Kingdom, where he worked alongside specialists in international adjudication. In 2010, he was a visiting professor at the XXXVII Course on International Law of the Organization of American States (OAS), Rio de Janeiro. Brant was also a visiting professor at Université Paris-Ouest Nanterre la Défense in 2013. From 2016 to 2017, he worked as visiting professor at L'Institut d'Études Politiques d'Aix-en-Provence – SciencesPo Aix, France.

In 2011, he delivered the Gilberto Amado Memorial Lecture before the United Nations International Law Commission in Geneva, on the scope of consent in international dispute resolution. He also served as a speaker at the 73rd Congress of the Institut de Droit International (IDI) in Santiago, Chile (2007).

In June 2014, Brant was one of the candidates nominated by the Brazilian Government for the position of judge at the International Criminal Court. Ultimately, he was not elected; however, fellow Brazilian Sylvia Steiner was elected.

In September 2023, Brant was appointed Member of the Governing Council of the International Institute for the Unification of Private Law (UNIDROIT), Rome, Italy.

== Awards and honours ==
- Docteur Honoris Causa, Universidade Federal do Estado da Paraíba (UFPB), February 2026.
- Médaille d'Honneur au Mérite, Tribunal de Justiça do Estado da Paraíba, February 2026.
- Voto de Congratulação, Assembleia Legislativa de Minas Gerais, 21 February 2024.
- Médaille Desembargador Helio Costa, Tribunal de Justiça de Minas Gerais, December 2023.
- Médaille Grand Officier de l'Ordre du Rio Branco (Conselho da Ordem do Rio Branco), Ministério das Relações Exteriores, December 2022, Brasília.
- Médaille de l'Inconfidência, Governo do Estado de Minas Gerais, Brazil, 2006.
- Membre honoraire, Academia Mineira de Letras Jurídicas, 2004.
- Personalidade Jurídica do Ano (Legal Personality of the Year), Associação Brasileira das Mulheres de Carreira Jurídica – Comissão Minas Gerais, 2002.
- Membre de la Société Française de Droit International (SFDI), 2000.
- Mention d'Honneur, InterAmerican Bar Association, 1991.

== Professional experiences ==
2023 – present: Member of the Governing Council, International Institute for the Unification of Private Law (UNIDROIT), Rome, Italy.

2022 – present: Judge of the International Court of Justice, The Hague.

2018: Member of the list of judges for the composition of the Special Tribunal for Lebanon, The Hague, Netherlands.

2016–2017: Visiting Professor at L'Institut d'Études Politiques d'Aix-en-Provence – SciencesPo Aix, France.

2013: Member of the Advisory Committee, Organisation for Economic Co-operation and Development (OECD).

2013–2014: Member of the Advisory Committee for Nominations of the International Criminal Court (ICC), The Hague.

2013: Visiting Professor at the Université Paris-Ouest Nanterre la Défense, France.

2011: Speaker at the Gilberto Amado Memorial Lecture, UN International Law Commission, Geneva.

2010: Visiting Professor at the XXXVII Training Course for Jurists of the Organization of American States (OAS), Rio de Janeiro, Brazil.

2009: Visiting Professor at the Institut des Hautes Études Internationales – Université Panthéon Assas Paris II, France.

2009: Visiting Senior Researcher at the Lauterpacht Centre for International Law, Cambridge University, United Kingdom.

2007: Visiting Professor at Université Caen Basse-Normandie, France.

2007: President of the International Relations Commission of the Brazilian Bar Association of Minas Gerais (OAB-MG), Brazil.

2006–present: President and Founder of the Brazilian Yearbook of International Law.

2006–present: Member of the Advisory Council of the Konrad Adenauer Foundation (Fundação Konrad Adenauer), Brazil.

2005–2006: Director of the Brazilian branch of the International Law Association (ILA), Brazil.

2005–present: President and Founder of the International Law Winter Program, Brazil.

2004–2008: Director of the International Law Department at the Instituto dos Advogados de Minas Gerais (IAMG), Brazil.

2003: Lecturer at L'Université de Dijon, Dijon, France.

2003–2004: Legal Officer (Juriste), Registry of the Legal Department, International Court of Justice (ICJ), The Hague.

2000–2022: Lawyer and Partner at Nemer e Guimarães Advogados Associados, Brazil.

2000–2021: Tenured Professor of Public International Law, Pontifícia Universidade Católica de Minas Gerais, Brazil.

2000–present: President and Founder of the International Law Center (CEDIN), Belo Horizonte, Brazil.

1994–1995 and 2005–2009: Legal Advisor for International Affairs, Municipality of Belo Horizonte, Brazil.

1994–present: Tenured Professor of Public International Law, Federal University of Minas Gerais (UFMG), Belo Horizonte, Brazil.

== Languages ==
Portuguese (native), French (fluent), English (fluent), Spanish (fluent).

== Selected publications ==
=== Books ===
- BRANT, L. N. C. Fontes não convencionais do Direito Internacional Público. Belo Horizonte: CEDIN, 2022. 176p.
- BRANT, L. N. C. As fontes convencionais do direito internacional – Direito dos Tratados. Belo Horizonte: CEDIN, 2021. 256p.
- BRANT, L. N. C.; SILVA, T. M. (Org.). Mineração em Terras Indígenas na América Latina: Desenvolvimento e Meio Ambiente. Belo Horizonte: CEDIN, 2021. 183p.
- BRANT, L. N. C. Teoria geral do direito internacional público. Belo Horizonte: O Lutador, 2020. 607p.
- BRANT, L. N. C.; DINIZ, P. I. R. (Org.). Agenda 2030 e o desenvolvimento sustentável no contexto latino-americano. Belo Horizonte: CEDIN, 2020. 160p.
- BRANT, L. N. C. Os Autores e Destinatários do Direito Internacional. Belo Horizonte: CEDIN, 2019. 222p.
- BRANT, L. N. C. A Autonomia do Direito Internacional. 2. ed. Belo Horizonte: CEDIN, 2018. 179p.
- BRANT, L. N. C.; STEINER, S. H. (Org.). O Tribunal Penal Internacional: comentários ao Estatuto de Roma. Belo Horizonte: Del Rey, 2015. 1688p.
- BRANT, L. N. C.; LAGE, D. A.; CREMASCO, S. S. (Org.). Direito Internacional contemporâneo. Curitiba: Juruá, 2011. 872p.
- BRANT, L. N. C. (Org.). Comentário à Carta das Nações Unidas: artigo por artigo. Belo Horizonte: CEDIN, 2008. 1340p.
- BRANT, L. N. C. Para entender o funcionamento da Corte Internacional de Justiça: processo contencioso e sentença. 7. ed. Curitiba: Juruá, 2012. 157p.
- BRANT, L. N. C. A Corte Internacional de Justiça e a construção do Direito Internacional. Belo Horizonte: CEDIN, 2005. 1291p.
- BRANT, L. N. C. L'autorité de la chose jugée en Droit International Public. Paris: LGDJ, 2004. 396p.
- BRANT, L. N. C. (Org.). O Brasil e os novos desafios do Direito Internacional. Rio de Janeiro: Forense, 2004. 712p.
- BRANT, L. N. C. (Org.). Direito e terrorismo: os impactos do terrorismo na Comunidade internacional e no Brasil. Rio de Janeiro: Forense, 2002. 570p.

=== Selected articles and book chapters ===
- BRANT, L. N. C. Finality of Judgments: International Court of Justice. Max Planck Encyclopedias of International Law, Oxford Public International Law, February 2023.
- BRANT, L. N. C. The Scope of Consent as a Basis of the Authority of the Award of the International Court of Justice. Gilberto Amado Memorial Lectures. Brasília: Fundação Alexandre de Gusmão, 2012, v. 1, p. 299–321.
- BRANT, L. N. C.; ROTA, M. La réforme du Conseil de sécurité: ses perspectives en Amérique du Sud. L'Observateur des Nations Unies, v. 24, p. 127–152, 2010.
- BRANT, L. N. C. L'Article 12 de La Charte des Nations Unies. In: La Charte des Nations Unies – Commentaire article par article. 3. ed. Paris: Economica, 2005, v. 1, p. 683–690.
- BRANT, L. N. C. L'autorité de la chose jugée et la révision devant la CIJ à la lumière des derniers arrêts. Annuaire français de droit international, Paris, v. XLIX, p. 248–265, 2004.

== 2014 International Criminal Court judges election ==
During the 13th session of the Assembly of States Parties to the Rome Statute of the International Criminal Court, scheduled for 8 to 17 December 2014 in New York, six judges of the International Criminal Court were elected. Professor Brant was an unsuccessful candidate for this election.

== 2022 International Court of Justice judges election ==
Brant was one of the two Brazilian candidates running for the 2022 International Court of Justice judges election. In October 2022, he was elected judge in replacement of Antônio Augusto Cançado Trindade. According to Opinio Juris (blog), he will "continue Latin America's legal legacy at the Court, after the passing of Judge Trindade".
