= Gustave Rolin-Jaequemyns =

Belgian lawyer, diplomat and Minister of the Interior

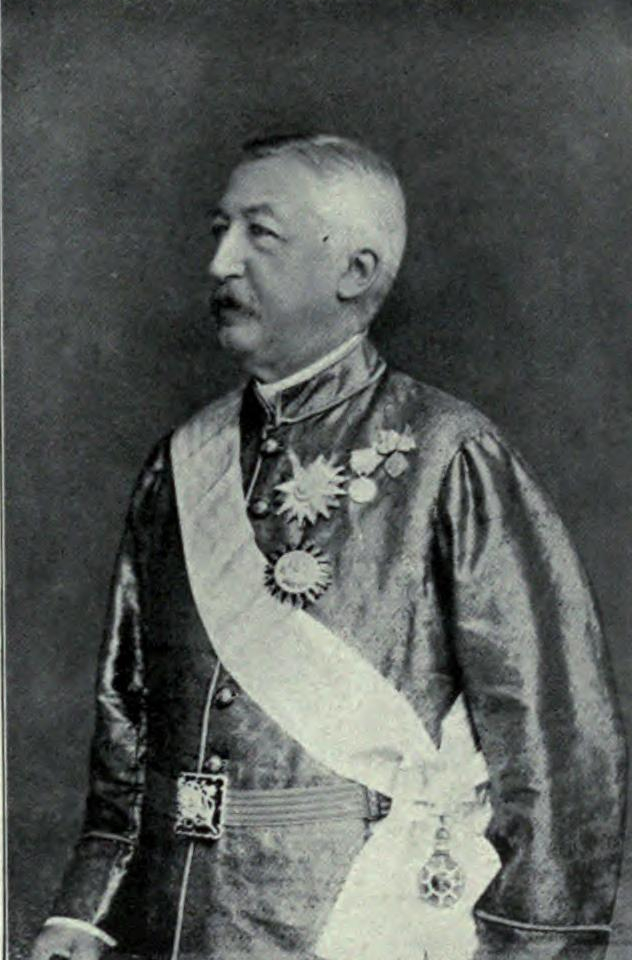
- Rolin-Jaequemyns in a traditional Thai garment.
- Born: 31 January 1835; Ghent, Belgium
- Died: 9 January 1902 (aged 66); Brussels, Belgium
- Other name: Chao Phya Abhai Raja
- Occupations: Lawyer, international law expert, Minister of the Interior, Advisor to Rama V
- Known for: Founder of the Institut de Droit International

Gustave Henri Ange Hippolyte Rolin-Jaequemyns (31 January 1835 – 9 January 1902) was a Belgian lawyer, diplomat, politician and Minister of the Interior (1878–1884) as a member of the Unitarian Liberal Party. He was the son of Hippolyte Rolin, the son in law of Edouard Jaequemyns, the brother of Albéric Rolin, the father of Edouard Rolin-Jaequemyns, and the uncle of Henri Rolin.Together with the Swiss jurist Gustave Moynier, he founded the Institut de Droit International and became its first Honorary President.

Even though his personal convictions were deeply religious, he is considered anticlerical because of his staunch defence of the separation of church and state. Serving as an advisor to King Rama V of Thailand, he played a crucial role in the reformation of that country to modern western standards and was awarded the title Chow Phya Abhai Raja, the highest distinction ever granted to a foreigner.

Rolin-Jaequemyns' reputation as an expert on international law was widely recognized. He played an important role in codifying the laws of war. He became a member of several national academies, for example 1870 in Montreal, 1872 in Madrid, in 1874 in Belgium and 1881 in Constantinople. In 1877, the University of Edinburgh granted him the title of Doctor Honoris Causa, and later he received the same distinction from the universities of Cambridge, Oxford and Brussels. In 1889 King Leopold II of Belgium appointed him member of the High Council for the independent state of the Congo Free State.

== Childhood and Youth ==
Gustave Rolin-Jaequemyns was the eldest of 15 children in the marriage between Hippolyte Rolin and Angélique Hellebaut. His father had graduated with distinction from the University of Leuven (French: Louvain), after which he was sworn in as solicitor and travelled to Berlin where he followed classes by von Savigny and Hegel. In 1830, at the start of the Belgian Revolution, he travelled to Courtrai and was elected into the National Assembly. Later (1848), he was elected into the Belgian Chamber of People's Representatives and held the office of Minister of Public Works.

Rolin excelled in the Gymnasium of Ghent and his musical skills quickly became apparent. At age 16 he travelled to the United Kingdom and thence to Paris, where he received a first prize at the Lycée Charlemagne. He then returned home and studied law at the University of Ghent. After graduating, he followed his father's example and went to Berlin for further studies. In 1860, when he was 25 years old, he was offered the chair of modern political history, but declined to help his father in his law firm.

In 1859, he married Emilie Jaequemyns and henceforth used the name "Rolin-Jaequemyns". Her father, an Orangist who favoured the unification of Belgium and The Netherlands, was indicted for his political views and Hippolyte defended him. Emilie was the daughter of a notable and wealthy family, and Gustave could focus on his studies of social and judicial matters.

== International Law ==
During one of the congresses of the Association Internationale pour le Progrès des Sciènces Sociales ("International Association for the Progress of Social Sciences"), which he himself founded, he met the Dutchman Tobias Asser and the Englishman John Westlake and the trio decided to establish the Revue de Droit International et de Législation Comparée ("Review of International Law and Comparative Legislation"), a periodical dedicated to comparative law studies, the first academic journal in history devoted to international law. The first issue, edited by Rolin-Jaequemyns and with contributions from many noted scholars, appeared in late 1868.

After the bloody Franco-German war of 1870–71, during which the Geneva Convention of 1863 was largely ignored by both sides, Rolin-Jaequemyns received letters written independently by Francis Lieber and Gustave Moynier urging the founding of an international organisation to promote the international rule of law. He was in an excellent position to contact many experts in the field, and consultations led to the founding of the Institut de Droit International in the townhall of Ghent on 8 September 1873.

The institute, which exists today, was the first permanent body of legal experts on international law. Its members laid the foundation of significant parts of modern international law. In 1904, two years after Rolin-Jaequemyns died, the institute received the Nobel Peace Prize.

== Political climate of Belgium (1848-1884) ==
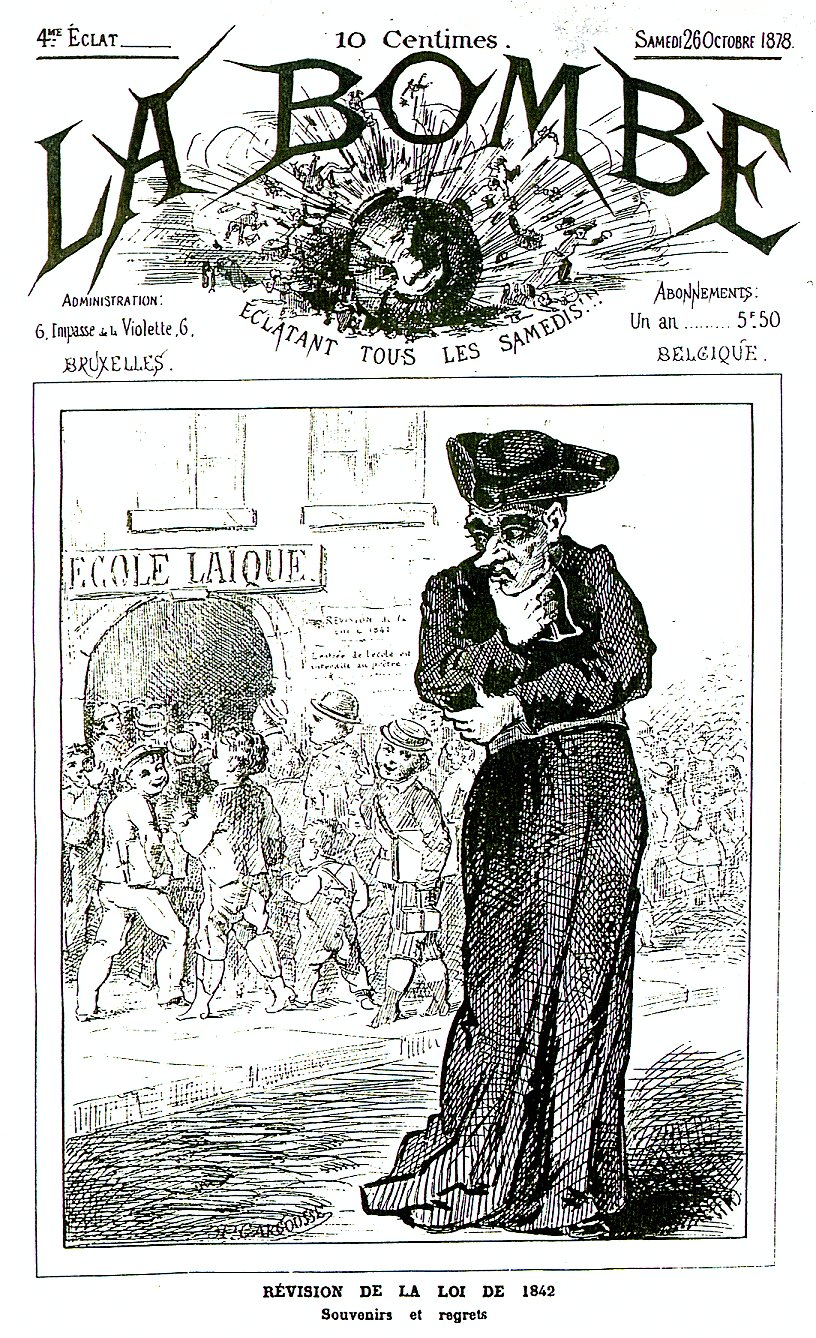
Cover of the satirical magazine La Bombe ("The Bomb") about the school struggle, 28 October 1878

Since the revolution year of 1848, the liberal faction was dominant in Belgian politics. There were Catholic cabinets, but these, generally, adopted the liberal agenda of Laissez faire, laissez passer. According to this view, the free interchange of goods and services and personal freedom should not be restricted by interventions of the state, even though this principle was relaxed somewhat in times of crisis. It's not justified, however, to see the Belgian liberalism only as an exponent of the bourgeoisie intent on extending their wealth and influence. Part of this ideology was also a cultural ideal: to liberate the individual from the dogmatic fetters imposed by the clergy and promote personal development through the promotion of liberal arts.

In the case of Rolin-Jaequemyns, this was expressed in his chairmanship of the Van Crombrugghe Genootschap, a Flemish cultural society founded by teachers and students of the municipal school in Ghent to "praise major Van Crombrugghe, who had done so much good for the municipal schools of Ghent".

From 1850 onward, the controversy between the Catholic Party and the liberals deepened. On the Roman Catholic side, the ultramontanists became the dominant faction, partly under influence of the papal Encyclical Quanta cura (1864) and especially the attached Syllabus Errorum in which the modern liberties were sharply condemned.

On the liberal side, mostly in circles of freemasons and the Université Libre de Bruxelles, the principle of "Free Research" (Vrij Onderzoek) gained influence, which, as it was interpreted there and then, was incompatible with catholic orthodoxy. This sharpened the anti-clerical sentiment among liberals which evolved into a militant anti-Catholicism. The complete secularisation of Belgian society became the liberals' prime objective. In order to achieve this aim, they were forced to interventions of the state, since social life was completely dominated by Roman Catholic organisations. The main battleground, however, was the field of education and the academic freedom of Belgian universities, where rationalism and scientific positivism were gaining ground.

First blows were exchanged over a parochial letter written by Mgr. L. Delebecque, Bishop of Bruges, in which he accused Prof. Wagener of "blasphemous" and "heretical" teachings and strongly condemned the University of Ghent. The letter was read in all churches in his diocese on Sunday 14 September 1856 and was followed by a similar action by the Bishop of Bruges, Mgr. J.B. Malou. The situation came to a head with the affair Laurent-Brasseur, two professors from Ghent who had, in the view of the clergy, made ex cathedra statements contradicting the official teachings of the Church. The Church had, by means of the Convention of Antwerp, gained a solid influence in academic matters and used it. This affair brought to light the deep divisions between liberals and Catholics and the country was divided into two camps: a clerical one and an anti-clerical one who battled each other in every way possible.

== School Struggle ==
After the liberal victory in the elections of 1878, Rolin-Jaequemyns accepted the post of Minister for the Interior in the cabinet of the "papenvreter" ("catholic-muncher") Walthère Frère-Orban who unleashed the "School Struggle" (Schoolstrijd). This was a direct consequence of a law intended to break once and for all the influence of the Roman Catholic Church over the Belgian schooling system. However, the cabinet had greatly underestimated catholic resistance. Catholic schools sprang up everywhere and a battle, fought with a fanaticism that would reverberate through Belgian society for decades to come, raged for every teacher and every pupil. Belgium seemed to be on the brink of civil war.

The liberals lost. Their initiative had united the Catholics and the network of schools founded in this period rapidly overreached the municipal schools. The ecoles laïque emptied and the liberals suffered a major loss in 1884. Rolin-Jaequemyns, who had played a major role in this cabinet, was excommunicated with the rest of the cabinet-members, though this was later revoked due to the intervention of his brother Edouard. With this defeat, the political career of Rolin-Jaequemyns was over and he could focus once more on the Institut and the Revue.

== Congo ==
From the mid-1870s Rolin-Jaequemyns, like many other members of the Institut de Droit International, occupied himself with the Belgian colonial aspirations in Congo. He applauded the founding of the Association Internationale Africain in 1876 by King Leopold II and especially its scientific and philanthropic goals, even though its main mission was strictly colonial. However, he did point out that colonisation by private enterprises would not give any guarantees for a fair treatment of the native population or an effective protection of the colonists.

The member of the institute saw the Congo Conference in 1884 as a good opportunity to set clear standards for the establishments of colonial governments. The outcome of the conference on this point was greeted favourably by Rolin-Jaequemyns and other members of the institute but soon turned out to be of little practical value. Four years later Rolin-Jaequemyns was appointed member of the Conseil Supérieur for the Congo Free State, which had been created by Leopold II as a reaction to the rising criticism of the Belgian conduct. Like almost all members of the institute, Rolin-Jaequemyns refrained from any critical remarks when the details of atrocities in the Congo Free State became known. On the other hand, he did not try to defend Leopold's colonial politics, as other Belgian jurists, such as Félicien Cattier, Ernest Nys, and Edouard Descamps, had done.

== Siam ==
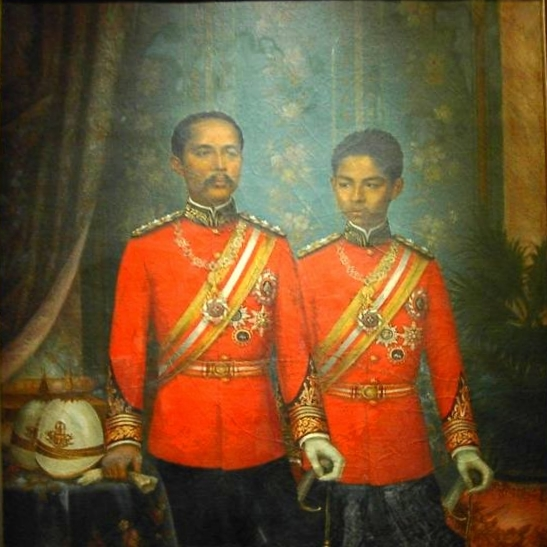
King Rama V and the Crown-prince Vajirunhis

=== Cairo ===
After his brother lost the family fortune with rash investments, Gustave needed to earn a living. Rather than accept a position with the Belgian government to which he was opposed, he chose to travel to Egypt with the expectation of being appointed Attorney-General. However, before the appointment could be finalized, the Khedive died. Meanwhile, he became a member of the high society and proved, to the joy of his hosts, a gifted musician. During a lunch hosted by the British ambassador in December 1891, he met Prince Damrong of Siam, who had gone to Europe to search for a General Advisor for his half-brother King Chulalongkorn (Rama V). Following a hasty correspondence with Bangkok, the prince was able to offer Rolin-Jaequemyns an annual salary of £3000. Despite the opposition of his wife and his own poor health, he accepted. The Siam offer was his opportunity "to realize his dream to put into practice his principles of law and to ensure that respect for international law enabled a small, threatened country to resist the major powers."

Rolin-Jaequemyns' contract specified two functions. First he was to assist the Siamese government to modernize and codify the country's body of laws; and second, he was to serve as an advisor concerning foreign affairs. His position held no formal power. In his words, the position of General Advisor has "no means to enforce his advice except by persuasion. Of course he cannot pretend to persuade always nor all at once, and he has to get accustomed to a perfect practice of patience."

Gustave Rolin-Jaequemyns arrived in Bangkok on 27 September 1892. Aside from periodic trips to Europe, he stayed until April 1901 when his health could no longer tolerate the climate.

=== Situation in Siam ===
Siam was being pressured by the colonial powers to open up and modernize the country for trade. In 1855 Chulalongkorn's father King Mongkut (Rama IV) agreed to a one-sided treaty with Britain. The Bowring Treaty (1) limited duties on imported goods to 3%; (2) eliminated all restrictions on British traders buying and selling goods; and (3) provided extraterritorial rights to subjects of the foreign powers such that if they broke any Thai law they would be tried in courts of their own country's legation. The first condition severely limited the government's ability to undertake major development projects. (By contrast the French colonial government in Saigon charged 10% duties.) The second condition eliminated the monopolies by which the Royal household and noble families financed themselves. The third condition enormously complicated administration of the country as many people claimed ties to colonies elsewhere as a means to escape justice or avoid corvee labour obligations. Having granted these privileges to one country, King Mongkut then signed similar treaties with all its other trading partners. Thus he preserved the peace among them and limited the influence of any one foreign power within his kingdom.

These arrangements satisfied most of the imperial nations' immediate requirements. The French, however, were particularly aggressive. Having already taken possession of French Indochina (present-day Vietnam) and much of Cambodia and Laos, they seemed to try to transform Siam into a protectorate. Rolin-Jaequemyns wrote that he was "convinced that this is a systematic campaign undertaken by colonial authorities of Annam and Cambodia destined to veil the little success as well as to justify the enormous costs of their interior administration." On 13 July 1893, three French gunships forced their way up the Chao Phraya River to Bangkok. Siamese fired on them from their land battery to which the French responded with devastating effect. The so-called Paknam Incident was part of the Franco-Siamese conflict of 1893, after which the Siamese agreed to cede Laos to France. Rolin-Jaequemyns played a major role in the negotiations by using his contacts in the top echelons of European society to negotiate directly with the French President and British Prime Minister, thus subverting the self-interested colonial officials. These negotiations dragged on for 15 years. In 1906, Siam ceded Battambang and Siem Reap in Cambodian territory to French Indochina; and in the Anglo-Siamese Treaty of 1909, relinquished claims to Kedah, Kelantan, Perlis, and Terengganu in Upper Malaya. Siam lost large sections of her territory, but retained her independence.

=== Reforms ===
King Chulalongkorn understood that his kingdom could survive only by modernizing its judicial, administrative and military capacity and thus offer the colonial powers sufficient incentives and deterrents to respect its sovereignty. Since 1860, a handful of foreign advisers had been recruited to fill senior positions to guide the modernization process. Following the Paknam Incident their numbers rose within four years to 58 British, 22 Germans, 22 Danes, 9 Belgians, 8 Italians and 20 others. As "General Advisor" Rolin-Jaequemyns had the closest relationship to the king.

Rolin-Jaequemyns learned the Thai language and had large sections of the existing body of laws translated. In 1895, he wrote to the president of the International Association for Comparative Legal Studies that the material proved highly interesting and was an indispensable preparation for the reform. It would be wrong, he wrote, to simply to transplant western statutes. Instead one should strive to preserve the traits of the traditional law, (which in the case of Siam was based on the Dharmasastra, a buddhist system) while bringing them up-to-date with modern requirements.

With the help of expatriate advisers and the support of European-educated princes, the King managed to separate his personal fortune from the state treasury and create a bureaucracy to replace a government structure which had its roots in the 15th century. As General Advisor, Rolin-Jaequemyns had a role in most of these initiatives especially the foundation of Siam's first Law school. His statue now stands on the campus of the Law Faculty of Thammasat University in Bangkok.

== Chao Phya Abhai Raja Rolin-Jaequemyns, his legacy ==
His achievements for Siam were formally recognized by King Chulalongkorn (Rama V) when he elevated Gustave Rolin-Jaequemyns to the rank of Chao Phya,^{[1]} the highest non-royal rank in Siamese hierarchy. His full title was Chao Phya Abhai Raja Siammanukulkij (เจ้าพระยาอภัยราชาสยามานุกูลกิจ; RTGS: Chaophraya Aphairacha Sayammanukunkit).

Rolin-Jaequemyns was voted to place 373 in the list of "Greatest Belgians Ever". In particular, he is commended for his role in the founding of the Institut de Droit International, which some have credited for laying the foundation of modern international law and the International Court of Justice.

"The competence and gesture of this person, who was so important to the government of Siam, will be imprinted in our memory forever"

— King Chulalongkorn (Rama V).

== Published work ==
The work published by Gustave Rolin-Jaequemyns mainly consists of political and legal essays about issues of relevance for the politics of Belgium and topics related to international law, as well as travel accounts and diary-like records about his time in Thailand. Some of these publications are:

- Des partis et de leur situation actuelle en Belgique. Brussels 1864
- De la réforme électorale. Brussels 1865
- Note sur la théorie du droit d'intervention. In: Revue de Droit Internationale et de Législation Comparée. 8/1876, S. 673–682
- L'Arménie, les Arméniens et les traités. In: Revue de Droit Internationale et de Législation Comparée. 19/1887, S. 284-325 und 21/1889, S. 291–353; Reprint in English by John Heywood: Armenia, the Armenians and the Treaties. London 1891
- Mémoire sur quelques questions se rapportant aux relations entre le Siam et la France sous les traités existents. Co-operative Printing Society Limited, London 1896

== See also ==
- Edward Henry Strobel – The first American Adviser in Foreign Affairs to King Chulalongkorn, Rolin-Jaequemyns successor

== Notes ==
1. Both the Dutch form "Gustaaf" and French spelled "Gustave" are widely used, sometimes appearing in a same document. "Gustave" seems to be the official spelling, e.g. according to the letter of mourning that unlike most French language sources spelled "Chow Phya"; few English sources nevertheless also show this spelling of his title. "Ars Moriendi" (in French). Archived from the original on 28 September 2007.
2. Prof. Dr. Jacques H. Herbots merely states 17 children, while the GeneaNet site names 15 with years of birth and death.
3. Nationalism, universalism, empire: International Law in 1871 and 1919, Martti Koskenniemi.
4. Literair Gent ("Literary Ghent")
5. Introduction by Baron Edouard Rolin-Jaequemyns to Walter J.Tipps 1996 page xii
6. Tipps 1996 page 9
7. Gustave Rolin-Jaequemyns in a letter to Westlake dated 28 November 1892 quoted by Tipps 1996 page 22
8. Documentation on the Paknam Incident
9. Chris Baker and Pasuk Phongpaichit "A History of Thailand" 2005 page 68
10. Final result of the nomination-phase of the "Greatest Belgian Ever".
11. For instance in the speech of Prof. Dr. Herbots below.
12. Martti Koskenniemi. Journal of International Law and Politics.
13. Insii Thai House

== Sources ==
- Speech by Prof. Dr. J. Herbots about Gustave Rolin-Jaequemyns. law.kuleuven.ac.be (in Dutch)
- Beknopte geschiedenis van de Liberale Partij, Prof. dr. Marcel Bots, 1989, Liberaal Archief (in Dutch)
- Schets eener geschiedenis der Vlaamsche Beweging, Paul Fredericq, Ghent, 1908" dbnl.org (in Dutch)
- De Heilige Stoel en de zaal Laurent-Brasseur (1856) , Dr. E. Lamberts, Belgisch tijdschrift voor nieuwste geschiedenis, 2 (1970) 83-111. flwi.ugent.be (PDF) (in Dutch)
- Biography of Tobias Asser inghist.nl (in Dutch)
- British Financial Advisers in Siam in the Reign of King Chulalongkorn, Ian Brown, Modern Asian Studies, Vol. 12, No. 2 (1978), pp. 193-215 Jstor.org
- Website of the Rolin-family about Gustave Rolin-Jaequemyns rolin.org (in French)
- "Letter of mourning" on ars-moriendi.be (in French)
