= August von Bulmerincq =

Baltic German jurist and historian (1822–1890)

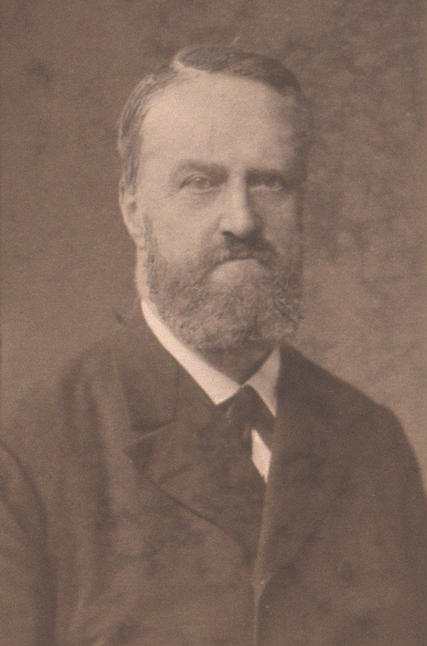
August von Bulmerincq

August Michael von Bulmerincq (12 August [O.S. 31 July] 1822 – 18 August 1890) was a Baltic German scholar of international law, considered one of the most important German-speaking legal scholars of his generation. He was born in Riga, in what was at the time the Governorate of Livonia of the Russian Empire. His family was wealthy and influential. From 1841, he studied law at the University of Tartu, and eventually settled in Tartu and pursued a long academic career. Upon his retirement in 1875, he moved to Wiesbaden in present-day Germany and was later given the chair of international law at Heidelberg University, which he maintained until his death. He is counted as one of the founding members of the Institut de Droit International.

His academic work focused on the theoretical underpinnings of international law. He insisted on the separation between law and politics, following in the liberal tradition of Friedrich Carl von Savigny. In his legal positivist view, an expanding legal order and a legalisation of international relations was an important part of a broader, teleological civilisational progression which mankind was engaged in, and which would lead away from a more capricious political order to a predictable, law-based order.

Politically he was a conservative, whose views of contemporary political issues were closely linked to his identity as a Lutheran and a Baltic German.

== Biography ==
August von Bulmerincq came from a wealthy Baltic German family. The family was of Scottish origin and had settled in Lübeck in the 17th century. In 1677, the family had moved from there to Riga, where August von Bulmerincq was born. At the time of his birth, Riga was part of the Russian Empire, and the administrative centre of the Governorate of Livonia. His father was a successful merchant and an alderman at the Great Guild in Riga. Many of his ancestors had served in the administration of the Russian Empire as civil servants, officers, scholars, doctors and architects.

August von Bulmerincq moved to Tartu (at the time known mainly by its German name Dorpat) and began studying law in 1841. At the time, the language of instruction at the University of Tartu was German. He became a candidate of law in 1847 and then briefly attended Heidelberg University, before returning to his native land in 1848 on account of the Revolutions of 1848. He began practicing law in Riga, and at the same time continued his legal studies. In 1849 he attained his master's degree. He remained in Riga until 1853, when he moved permanently to Tartu to pursue his academic career. He attained the degree of Privatdozent in 1854. Two years later he produced his doctoral thesis, and from then on worked mainly in the field of international law. The subject had only been tentatively studied and taught in Tartu before. From 1858, he was ordinary professor in public law, international law and politics. He stayed in Tartu until his retirement in 1875. Two years before his retirement, he was invited to participate at the founding of the Institut de Droit International in Ghent, but could not attend since the invitation did not reach him in time. He was later, however, counted among its founding members, and would become one of its most active members. During his time as professor, a number of works focused on the theory and history of international law were produced under his supervision; among his students were the statistician and economist Witold Załęski.

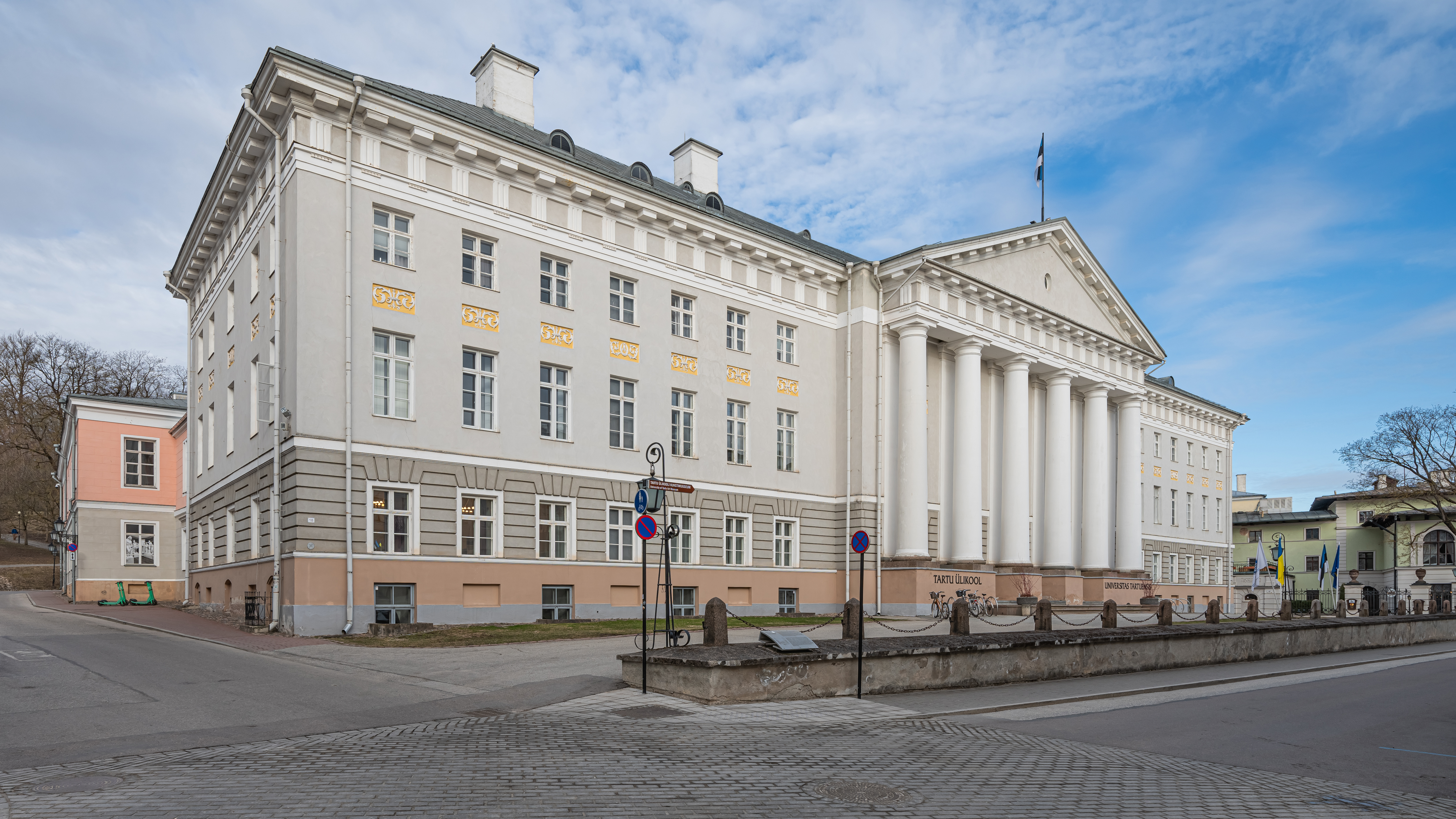
The main building of the University of Tartu, where August von Bulmerincq spent most of his academic career.

Besides his academic career, Bulmerincq was also active in philanthropic societies and in public life. In 1863, he founded a journal dedicated to economy and agriculture (the Baltische Wochenschrift), and he was also the organiser of the first agricultural congress in the present-day Baltic states.

After his retirement, Bulmerincq moved to Wiesbaden in present-day Germany. Following the death of Johann Kaspar Bluntschli in 1881, Bulmerincq was given the chair of international law at Heidelberg University, which he maintained until his death. He died in Stuttgart on 18 August 1890.

== Contributions to international law ==
August von Bulmerincq belonged to an influential, early generation of scholars of international law, and contributed to forming the modern specialisation and understanding of the discipline. His main interest was in the theoretical foundations of international law. He is considered one of the most important German-speaking legal scholars of his generation. Bulmerincq worked in the tradition of Friedrich Carl von Savigny and had a broadly liberal view of international law, contrasting with views of scholars such as Karl von Gareis who adhered to a worldview grounded in Realpolitik thought. Bulmerincq was a legal positivist and argued that in the international arena, it was important to separate law from politics. While acknowledging that both politics and law are used by states to further their interests (in Bulmerincq's view, politics tend to favour short-term interests, while a legal order favours long-term interests), the main distinction between politics and law for Bulmerincq lay, according to legal historian Lauri Mälksoo, in the "absence or presence of the choice of will. While politics could choose the means that seemed appropriate in particular circumstances, in law there was only one rule that had to be applied correctly." Furthermore, in his view an expanding legal order and a legalisation of international relations was an important part of a broader, teleological civilisational progression which mankind was engaged in, and which would lead away from a more capricious political order to a predictable, law-based order.

== Political views ==
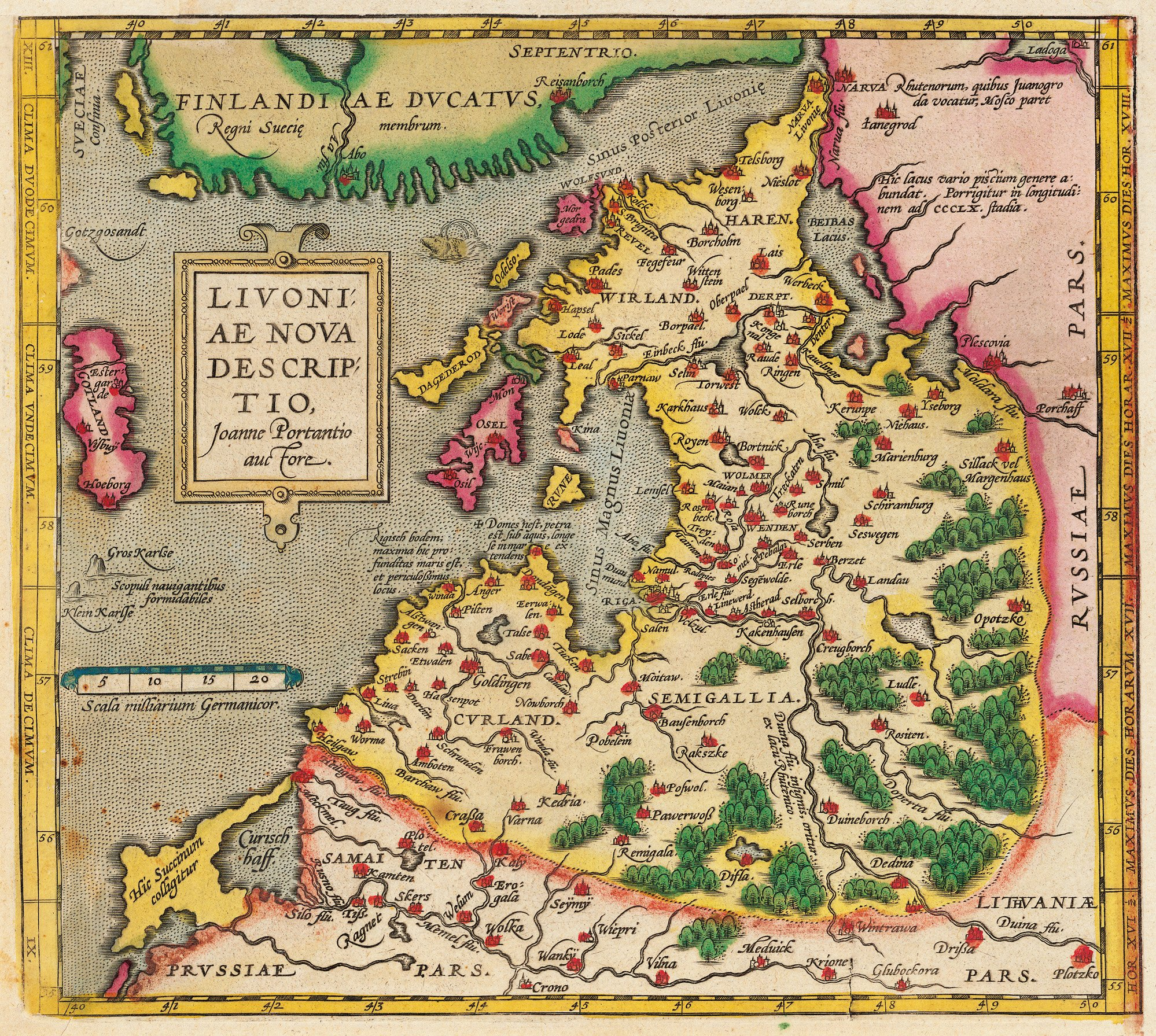
Map of Livonia from the 16th century. Bulmerincq expressed regret that Livonia lost its unity following the Livonian War.

In contrast to his overarching liberal legal outlook, Bulmerincq was a political conservative, whose views of contemporary political issues were closely linked to his identity as a Lutheran and a Baltic German. He was opposed to contemporary attempts at Russification in the Baltic provinces of the Russian Empire, but did not engage himself in this conflict very actively. Bulmerincq considered Baltic Germans to be culturally superior to Estonians and Latvians, though he admitted that wider inclusion of non-Germans was a necessity, and had an essentially colonial attitude to these peoples. Similarly, in his legal work he distinguished between countries he considered "civilised" and subjected to certain legal norms, and countries and peoples which he did not consider part of this "family of nations". He viewed the German settlement and Germanisation of the Baltic lands during the Middle Ages as positive, and expressed nostalgia and disappointment for the lost unity of Old Livonia. He was in favour of the Unification of Germany, and opposed socialism; these views coincided with those of Otto von Bismarck, and Bulmerincq publicly announced them in connection with his move to Germany in 1875.

== Sources cited ==
- Erochin, Alexander (2019). "August Michael von Bulmerincq". In Böttcher, Winfried (ed.). Europas vergessene Visionäre: Rückbesinnung in Zeiten akuter Krisen (in German). Baden-Baden: Nomos. pp. 272–280. doi:10.5771/9783845288352. ISBN 978-3-8487-4583-8.
- Kleinschmidt, Harald (2016). "The Family of Nations as an Element of the Ideology of Colonialism". Journal of the History of International Law / Revue d'histoire du droit international. 18 (2–3): 278–316. doi:10.1163/15718050-12340067.
- Mälksoo, Lauri (2005). "The Context of International Legal Arguments: 'Positivist' International Law Scholar August von Bulmerincq (1822-1890) and His Concept of Politics". Journal of the History of International Law / Revue d'histoire du droit international. 7 (2): 181–209. doi:10.1163/157180505774763770.
- Simon, Hendrik (2018). "The Myth of 'Liberum Ius ad Bellum': Justifying War in 19th-Century Legal Theory and Political Practice". The European Journal of International Law. 29 (1): 113–136. doi:10.1093/ejil/chy009.
