= Ernest Nys =

Belgian lawyer and scholar

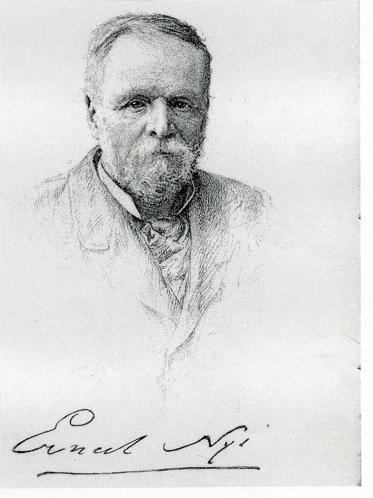
- Born: 27 March 1851; Kortrijk, Belgium
- Died: 12 September 1920 (aged 69); Brussels, Belgium
- Occupation: Professor of international law
- Employer: University of Brussels
- Known for: Work in public international law

Ernest Nys (27 March 1851 – 4 September 1920) was a Belgian lawyer and a professor of Public International Law at the University of Brussels. He also served as a member of the Permanent Court of Arbitration.

== Life ==
Ernest Nys was born in 1851 in Kortrijk, Belgium and studied law at the Universities of Ghent, Heidelberg, Leipzig and Berlin. He then worked as a lawyer in Antwerp and Brussels. He succeeded Alphonse Rivier as Professor of International Law at the University of Brussels, following the death of Professor Rivier in 1898. Nys also acted as dean from 1898 to 1900.

In 1909, Nys helped the anarchist Peter Kropotkin with the research for the book The Great French Revolution, 1789-1793, particularly the seemingly unusual relationship between revolutionists of renown and freemasonry, writing that revolutionaries were drawn to it "by its humanitarian tendencies, its firm belief in the dignity of man, and by its principles of liberty, equality and fraternity."

In the first half of the 20th century Nys was appointed member of the King's Leopold Conseil Supérieur de l'État Indépendant du Congo, namely the governing body of the Belgian monarchy private and industrial interests on the Republic of Congo.

Nys was a member of the Permanent Court of Arbitration in The Hague. He was particularly interested in the historical development of international law and translated works of English legal scholars James Lorimer and John Westlake. He died in 1920 in Brussels.

== Awards ==
Nys was a member of the Institut de Droit International from 1892 to his death. He was nominated for the Nobel Peace Prize from 1906 through 1916 and again in 1919 for his commitment to international arbitration. He was elected an International Member of the American Philosophical Society in 1908. He was awarded honorary doctorates at the University of Oxford, the University of Edinburgh, and the University of Glasgow (LL.D 1901). He was an honorary member of the American Society of International Law.

== Works ==
- The Papacy Considered in Relation to International Law London, 1879
- Les origins du droit international (The Origins of International Law), Brussel and Paris 1894
- Les politiques et le droit international theories de siècle France jusqu'au XVIII (Political theory and international law in France until the 18th century ), Paris 1899
- Researches in the History of Economics, London 1899
- The Independent State of the Congo and International Law Brussel 1903
- Idées modern: droit international et franc-maçonnerie (Modern ideas: International law and Freemasonry), Brussel 1908
