= Tobias Asser =

Dutch lawyer and academic (1838–1913)

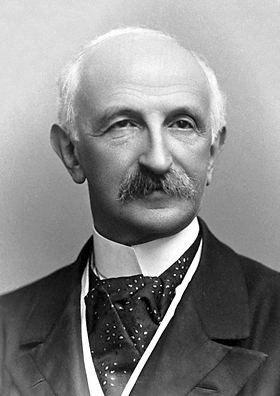
- Tobias Asser in 1911
- Born: Tobias Michel Karel Asser; 28 April 1838; Amsterdam, Netherlands
- Died: 29 July 1913 (aged 75); The Hague, Netherlands
- Known for: Founder of the Permanent Court of Arbitration
- Spouse: Johanna Ernestina Asser (m. 1864)
- Parent(s): Carel Daniël Asser sr. (father); Rosette Godefroi (mother)
- Awards: Nobel Peace Prize (1911)

Academic background
- Education: University of Amsterdam, Leiden University (PhD)
- Thesis: Geschiedenis der beginselen van het Nederlandsche Staatsregt omtrent het bestuur der buitenlandsche betrekkingen (1860)
- Doctoral advisor: Simon Vissering

Academic work
- Discipline: Public international law Private international law
- Institutions: University of Amsterdam

Tobias Michael Carel Asser (Dutch: [ˈtoːbijɑs miˈɕɛl ˈkaːrəl ˈɑsər]; 28 April 1838 – 29 July 1913) was a Dutch lawyer and legal scholar. In 1911, he won the Nobel Peace Prize (together with Alfred Fried) for his role in the establishment of the Permanent Court of Arbitration at the First Hague Peace Conference in 1899 and for his achievements in establishing the Hague Conference on Private International Law (HCCH).

== Life ==
Tobias Michael Carel Asser was born on 28 April 1838 in Amsterdam, the Netherlands, in a Jewish family. He was the son of Carel Daniel Asser (1813–1885) and grandson of Carel Asser (1780–1836). He studied law at the University of Amsterdam and Leiden University and was a law professor at the University of Amsterdam.

Asser co-founded the Revue de Droit International et de Législation Comparée with John Westlake and Gustave Rolin-Jaequemyns. He also co-founded the Institut de Droit International in 1873. In 1880 he became a member of the Royal Netherlands Academy of Arts and Sciences.

=== The Hague Conference on Private International Law ===
Asser was a leading legal mind in the area of private international law and firmly believed that sound legal frameworks that govern private cross-border relationships would promote peace and stability. In 1893, Asser initiated the convocation of the First Diplomatic Session of the HCCH, the preeminent global organisation in the area of private international law. The participating States were Austria-Hungary, Belgium, France, Germany, Italy, Luxembourg, Netherlands, Portugal, Romania, Russia, Spain, and Switzerland. Asser was elected the Session's President, and subsequently re-elected at the Second to Fourth Session which took place in 1894, 1900 and 1904 respectively. Under his leadership, the HCCH developed some multilateral treaties, the Hague Conventions, that unified the rules of private international law in the areas of Marriage (1902), Divorce (1902), Guardianship (1902), Civil Procedure (1905), Effects of Marriage (1905), and Deprivation of Civil Rights (1905).

In 1911, Asser received the Nobel Peace Prize. In his Award Ceremony Speech on 10 December 1911, Chairman of the Nobel Committee Jørgen Gunnarsson Løvland emphasised specifically Asser's work in the field of private international law, and his achievements in establishing the HCCH, as reasons for receiving the Nobel Peace Prize, describing Asser as "a successor to or reviver of The Netherlands' pioneer work in international law in the seventeenth century", the Hugo Grotius of his time.

=== The Hague Peace Conferences ===
He was a delegate of the Netherlands to both Hague Peace Conferences in 1899 and 1907, where he urged the principle of compulsory arbitration be introduced in the economic area and contributed to the creation of the Permanent Court of Arbitration as the first global mechanism for the peaceful settlement of international disputes.

=== The Permanent Court of Arbitration ===
In 1902, he sat on the first arbitration panel to hear an international controversy brought by two states under the auspice of the Permanent Court of Arbitration, which was established as a result of the Hague Peace Conference of 1899 (the Pious Fund of the Californias Case). He also took a hand in the establishment of what would become The Hague Academy of International Law, though he did not live to see its foundation in 1923.

Asser died on 29 July 1913 in The Hague.

== Namesake ==
A research institute in the fields of Private and Public International Law, European Law and International Commercial Arbitration is named after Tobias Michael Carel Asser. This is the T.M.C. Asser Instituut, based in The Hague, Netherlands.

== See also ==
- List of Jewish Nobel laureates
