= Paulo Borba Casella =

Brazilian Professor

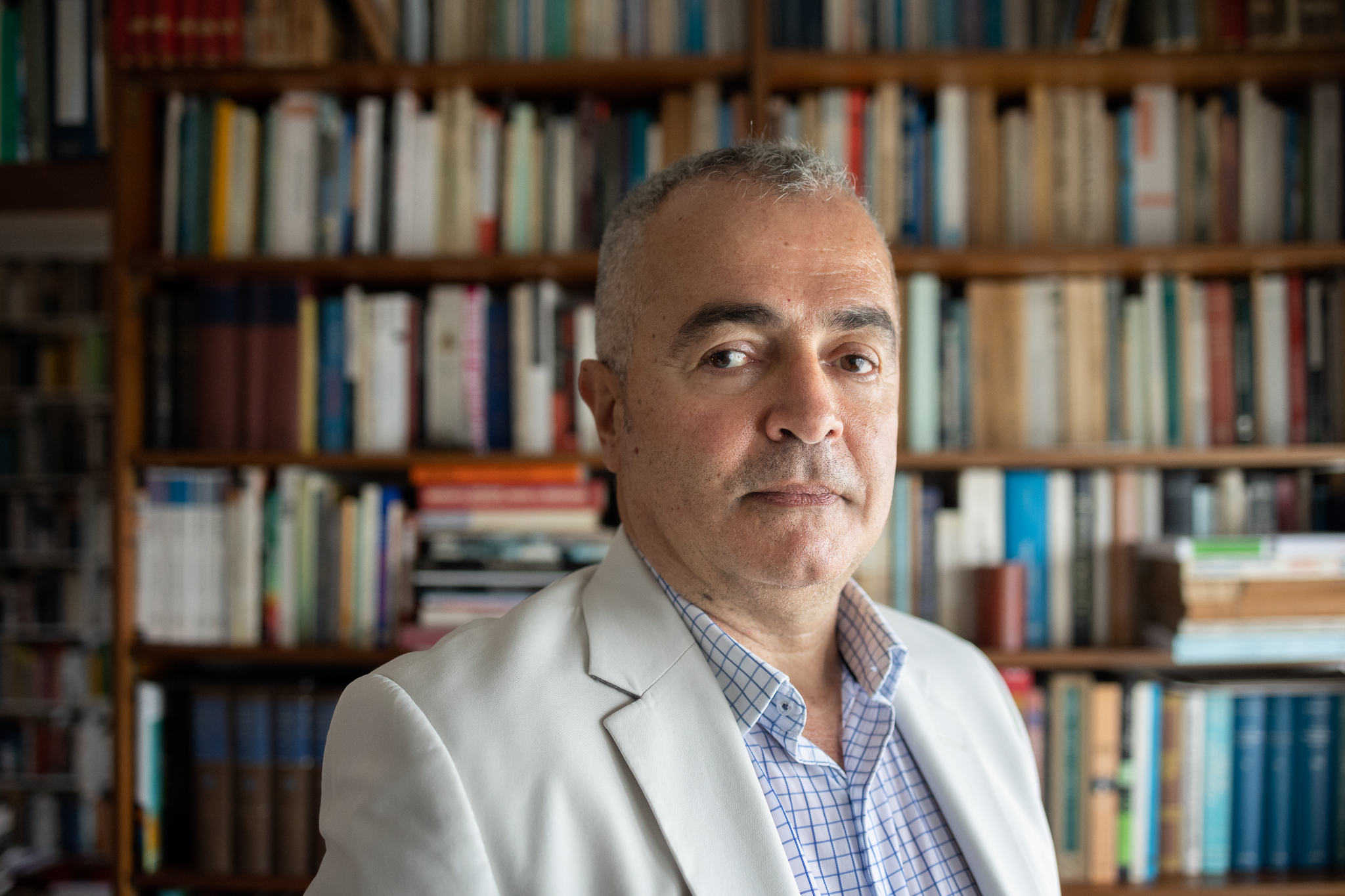
- Borba Casella at his personal library

Professor of Public International Law at São Paulo University Law School

Personal details
- Born: 16 September 1960 (age 65) São Paulo, SP, Brazil
- Education: University of São Paulo

Paulo Borba Casella is a Brazilian professor of international law at the University of São Paulo. He specialises in International and comparative law, and human rights. He has lectured at The Hague Academy of International Law.

He was a candidate for the 2022 International Court of Justice judges election, nominated by the Brazilian National Group at the Permanent Court of Arbitration.

== Academic career ==
Professor of Public International Law at São Paulo University Law School (USP, Full Professor since 2007) where he has lectured since 1984. Law Graduate (1982), Doctor degree in International Law (1986), "livre docente" in International Law (1993) at USP.

Deputy Director of the Law School at USP (2010-2014), Head of the Department of International and Comparative Law (2008–2010 and 2014–2018) and of the Publication Commission of the Law Journal of USP Law School.

President of DWI - Institute for International Law and Relations of São Paulo (since September 2018); Lawyer admitted to Brazilian Bar in São Paulo; coordinated courses on International Law at the Higher School of the Brazilian Bar Association (ESA-OAB-SP) (May 2019 to June 2021); coordinator of CEPIM - Centre of Studies on the International Protection of Minorities at USP and coordinator of GEBRICS - Group of Studies on the BRICS at USP.

Invited to lecture on "International Law, History and Culture" at The Hague Academy of International Law (January 2020), "Gilberto Amado Memorial Lecture" at the UNO International Law Commission, in Geneva (17 July 2013), courses at )(XXVI and XIII Courses on International Law at the Organization of American States (OAS) in 2009 and 2015, lectured at the Permanent Tribunal of Revision of the MERCOSUL in Asuncion, where he was awarded the Rosalba Medal and Diploma (2015) "in recognition of his contribution to International Law", lectured at the Ministry for Foreign Affairs of the Netherlands, The Hague (2013), lectured at the Institute for Latin America of the Russian Academy of Sciences, Moscow (2014), as well as at the Universities of Amsterdam, Asuncion, Berlim-Humboldt (2012, 2016), Bielefeld, Minho at Braga (2018, 2019, 2020), Buenos Aires, Coimbra, Cordoba, Heinrich Heine in Diisseldorf, Florence, Hamburg, Heidelberg, Helsinki, Hiroshima, Johannesburg, Leyden, Lisbon, European University of Lisbon, Lodz, Luxembourg, Lyon III (2000, 2015, 2016, 2018), Maastricht, Macau (from 2007 to 2012), Maputo, Mathura, Milan- Bocconi, Montreal, New Delhi, Nice, Ottawa, Paris-Sorbonne (2007, 2010, 2018), Paris-Pantheon-Assas, Rennes, Rome I - La Sapienza (2009, 2014), Rome II - Tor Vergata (2013), SaarbrUcken (1993, 1995), Saint Petersburg (2019) and the National Research University in Saint Petersburg (2011, 2014), Salamanca, Strasburg (where he also co-directed a Doctor degree completed in 2014), Tokyo-Meiji, Tlibingen, at the Brazilian Society for the Development of the Sciences (SBPC) (2015), the Ministry for Foreign Affairs in Brasilia and the Alexandre de Gusmao Foundation, in Rio de Janeiro as well as several Brazilian Universities.

Chaired and participated in procedures for the choice of Full Professors at the: Law School of the Federal University of Rio de Janeiro, for Public International Law (2020), Law School of the University of São Paulo, for Private International Law (2019), Law School of the State University of Rio de Janeiro for Public International Law (2017) and for Private International Law (2016), as well as at the University Eduardo Mondlane in Maputo, the Federal University in Julz de Fora, the USP Law School in São Paulo and in Ribeirao Preto, and others.

Fluent (speaks, reads and writes) in English, French, German, Italian, Portuguese and Spanish. He has good knowledge of Russian, Latin and Ancient Greek.
