= Edouard Rolin-Jaequemyns =

Belgian jurist and politician

Edouard Gustave Marie Rolin-Jaequemyns (1863–1936) was a Belgian jurist, diplomat and politician. He served as Belgian Minister of the Interior between 1925 and 1926, as a member of the Permanent Court of Arbitration between 1928 and 1930, and as a judge at the Permanent Court of International Justice between 1931 and 1936. He was the son of Gustave Rolin-Jaequemyns and the cousin of Henri Rolin.
