= Marcelo Kohen =

International lawyer

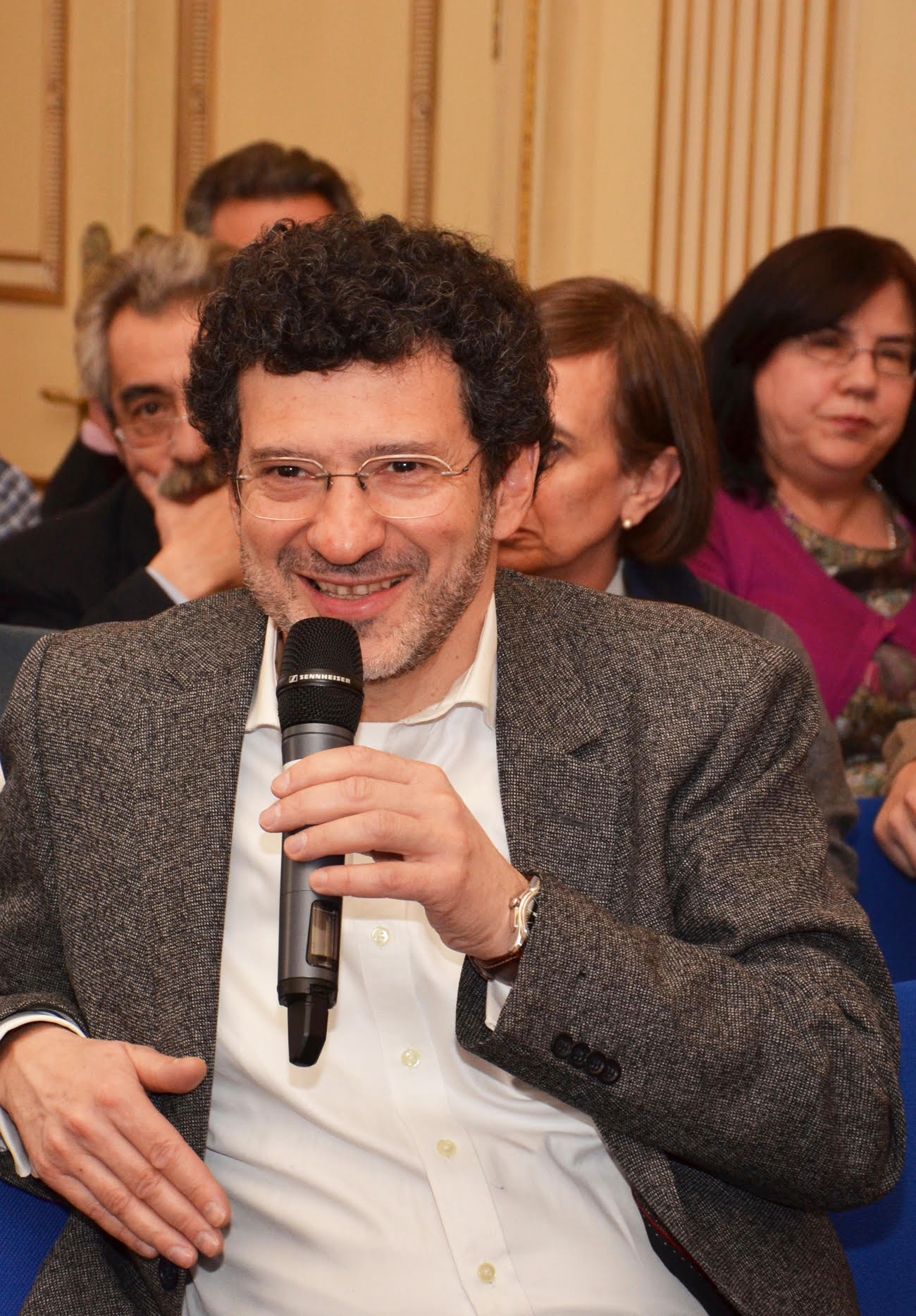
- Born: Rosario, Argentina
- Occupations: International lawyer, Academic
- Title: Professor of International Law

Academic work
- Discipline: International law
- Institutions: Graduate Institute of International Studies and University of Geneva, Institut de Droit International
- Main interests: International law, international adjudication

Marcelo Gustavo Kohen (born August 11, 1957) is an Argentine international lawyer and academic specialised in the areas of international legal theory, territorial and border disputes, international adjudication, and peaceful settlement of international disputes. He is a Professor of International Law at the Graduate Institute of International and Development Studies in Geneva.

Kohen is the Secretary-General of the Institut de Droit International, the oldest organisation of international lawyers and winner of the Nobel Peace Prize (1904). He was the first non-European appointed as Secretary-General since the Institut's foundation in 1870.

He has worked as legal counsel and advocate for several states before the International Court of Justice and the International Tribunal for the Law of the Sea. He has been an arbitrator designated by states in at least fourteen international cases, including at the International Centre for Settlement of Investment Disputes and UNCITRAL.

== Education ==
Kohen obtained his law degree from the National University of Rosario in 1983. He obtained the academy diploma from The Hague Academy of International Law in 1990. He obtained his PhD in International Law (summa cum laude) from the University of Geneva (Graduate Institute of International and Development Studies) in 1995, under the supervision of the Egyptian jurist and international judge Georges Abi-Saab.

== Career ==
Kohen has been Professor of International Law at the Graduate Institute of International and Development Studies in Geneva since 2002, and a faculty member since 1995. He has twice given courses at The Hague Academy of International Law. He began his academic career in 1986, when, soon after graduating, he became a faculty member at the National University of Rosario.

Kohen has been twice elected Secretary General of the Institut de Droit International (2015 and 2021). Kohen is also the founder of the Latin American Society of International Law and was appointed as its first Director General. Kohen has also served as Rapporteur for the International Law Association, the Council of Europe, as well as the Institut.

He has represented different states on at least twelve occasions before the ICJ, including Argentina in the Uruguay River pulp mill dispute and the Legal Consequences of the Separation of the Chagos Archipelago from Mauritius in 1965; Colombia in the Case concerning The Territorial and Maritime Dispute (Nicaragua v. Colombia); Costa Rica in the Dispute regarding Navigational and Related Rights (Costa Rica v. Nicaragua); and Serbia in the Advisory opinion on Kosovo's declaration of independence. He has also represented states at other international tribunals, including the International Tribunal for the Law of the Sea, where he represented Argentina in the “ARA Libertad” Case (Argentina v. Ghana). He has been an arbitrator designated by states from four continents and very different traditions and regimes in at least 14 international cases, including at the International Centre for Settlement of Investment Disputes and UNCITRAL.

Kohen is often cited in English, French, and Spanish-language news media for his expertise on matters of statehood, secession, and peaceful settlement of international disputes.

He is the author of several publications in English, French, and Spanish. His book "Possession contestée et souveraineté territoriale" (Presses universitaires de France, 1997) was awarded the Paul Guggenheim Prize in 1997.

== Secretary-General of the Institut de Droit International ==
Marcelo Kohen was elected Secretary General of the Institute of International Law in 2015, at the 77th session held in Tallinn (Estonia). He was re-elected as Secretary General in 2021.

Kohen represented the Institute at the World Summit of Nobel Peace Laureates 2019 in Mérida, Mexico. In this context, he argued that "the law is the weapon of the weak in their relationship with the powerful" and stressed that "force does not give rights."

== Selected publications ==
- Marcelo G. Kohen and Christian Tomuschat, 'Flexibility in International Dispute Settlement' (Brill, 2020).
- Marcelo G. Kohen and Patrick Dumberry, 'The Institute of International Law's Resolution on State Succession and State Responsibility' (Cambridge University Press, 2019).
- Marcelo G. Kohen and Mamadou Hébié, 'Research Handbook on Territorial Disputes in International Law' (EE Elgar, 2018).
- Marcelo G. Kohen, 'Secession: international law perspectives' (Cambridge University Press, 2006).
- Marcelo G. Kohen, 'Possession contestée et souveraineté territoriale' (Presses universitaires de France, 1997).
- Marcelo G. Kohen, 'La contribución de América Latina al desarrollo progresivo del Derecho Internacional en materia territorial' (Servicio de Publicaciones de la Universidad de Navarra, 2001).

== Selected lectures ==
Professor Marcelo Kohen is one of the largest contributors to the United Nations Audiovisual Library of International Law lecture series, that offers a "collection of lectures on virtually every subject of international law" given by the most prominent international law scholars and practitioners around the world. He has given four lectures, one mini-series, and features in two online panels. These include:

- 'La práctica y la teoría de las fuentes del Derecho Internacional' in the Lecture Series of the United Nations Audiovisual Library of International Law.
- 'La relation titres-effectivités dans le contentieux territorial' in the Lecture Series of the United Nations Audiovisual Library of International Law.
- 'Asia and International Law: A New Era. The Third Biennial Conference of the Asian Society of International Law' in the Lecture Series of the United Nations Audiovisual Library of International Law.
- 'Conference on the Occasion of the Centenary of the Peace Palace: The International Court of Justice and the International Legal System' in the Lecture Series of the United Nations Audiovisual Library of International Law.
