= EGMONT – The Royal Institute for International Relations =

Belgian international relations think tank

Coordinates: 50°50′22″N 4°21′37″E

- Established: 1947; 79 years ago
- Focus: Public policy
- Chair: Alexis Brouhns
- Director: Sven Biscop
- Address: Rue des Petits Carmes 24 A, 1000 Brussels
- Location: Brussels, Belgium
- Website: egmontinstitute.be

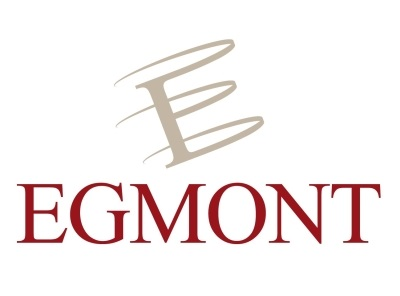
Egmont Institute logo

EGMONT – The Royal Institute for International Relations, also known as the Egmont Institute, is an independent Brussels-based think tank dedicated to interdisciplinary research on international relations. The main activities of the Egmont Institute include research, the organisation of events, and training for civil servants. The Institute benefits from funding from the Belgian Ministry of Foreign Affairs. Furthermore, it receives funding from EU Institutions and embassy membership fees.

== History ==
In 1947, the Royal Institute for International Relations (the Institute's original name) was founded by prominent Belgian political leaders including Paul van Zeeland, former Prime Minister; Prof. Charles de Visscher, member of the International Court of Justice; Prof. Fernand Dehousse, member of the Belgian delegation to the Conference of San Francisco; and Prof. Henri Rolin, Senator and Barrister-at-law. It received royal patronage in 1954, enhancing its prestige as a think tank modelled after Chatham House and the Council on Foreign Relations.

In the 1990s, Foreign Minister Louis Michel transformed the Egmont Institute from an organiser of conferences into a think-tank. This transformation came paired with the creation of the European Affairs and Europe in the World research programme.

In 2006, in the run up to its sixtieth anniversary, the Institute changed its name to "EGMONT – The Royal Institute for International Relations" referring to the Egmont Palace, where many of its events are held.

Since 2014, under the request of the FPS Foreign Affairs and then-Minister of Foreign Affairs Didier Reynders, the Egmont Institute has been organising training courses for diplomats.

To mark its 70th anniversary in 2017, the Institute hosted an event honoured by the presence of King Philippe of Belgium. In 2022, the Institute celebrated its 75th anniversary.

The Egmont Institute connects academic inquiry and policymaking. Located in the European capital, the Institute facilitates the exchange of ideas, translating scholarly research into strategies for foreign policy professionals and international stakeholders. Through training programs for civil servants and its role as a forum for high-level exchanges, the Institute supports the diplomatic community. The Institute assists policymakers in navigating global challenges by promoting evidence-based analysis in governance.

== List of presidents ==
- Charles De Visscher 1947–1958
- Fernand Van Langenhove 1958–1966
- Baron Baron Snoy et d'Oppuers 1966–1977
- Henri Simonet 1977–1983
- Baron Baron de Strycker 1983–1987
- Burgrave Davignon 1988–2017
- François-Xavier de Donnea 2017–2025

== Structure ==
The Egmont Institute is governed by a distinguished Board of Directors, composed of leading Belgian figures from politics, diplomacy, academia, and public administration. The current Chair of the Board of Directors (2026–present) is Alexis Brouhns, succeeding François-Xavier de Donnéa. The day-to-day leadership of the Institute is entrusted to the Acting Director General, Prof. Sven Biscop, who oversees the Institute's strategic direction and research agenda. The Board includes numerous honorary fellows, senior civil servants, and distinguished scholars, reflecting Egmont's enduring role as a bridge between policy, research, and international dialogue.

The Egmont Institute organises its work through specialised programmes and teams, drawing on a diverse staff of research fellows, senior associates, administrative experts, and trainees listed on its staff page. These efforts are structured across key departments, including Africa, European Affairs, Europe in the World, and Education & Training, supported by their respective associates, including training experts, as well as by the Communications & Events and Administration & Services departments. All the topics covered are listed on the topics page.

== Activities ==
=== Publications ===
The Institute produces different types of publications such as Egmont Papers, Policy Briefs and Commentaries. They are accessible for free and can be found on the website.

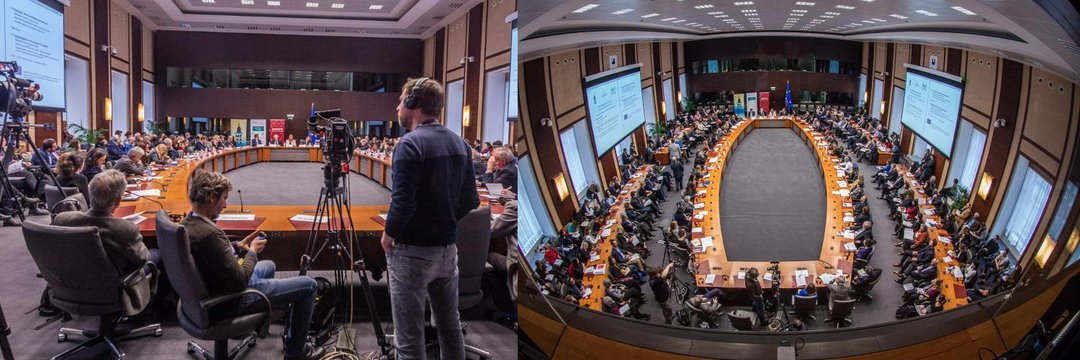

=== Events ===
Egmont also hosts events, including Conferences, colloquia and seminars, offering an opportunity for participants to exchange views with other specialists and with a well-informed public made up of representatives of the political, economic and academic spheres, the media and civil society.

=== Education and Training ===
The Institute provides education and training to various organizations and individuals including tailored courses in Diplomacy and Foreign Affairs, Civilian Crisis Management Training and Support to public administration.

=== Social Media ===
The Institute is present on different social media platforms including LinkedIn, X and Bluesky. It produces its original video content on YouTube and publishes podcasts.
