= Augusto Pierantoni =

Italian lawyer and politician

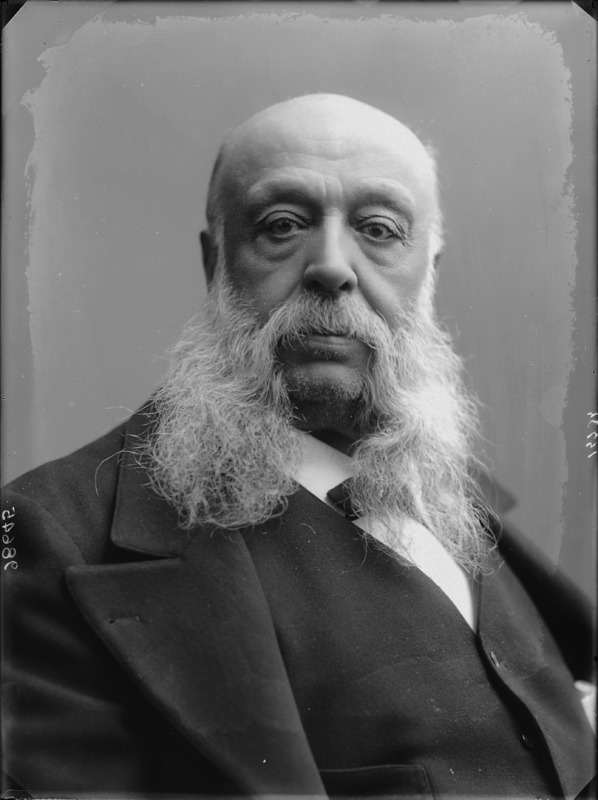
Pierantoni photographed by Mario Nunes Vais

Augusto Pierantoni (June 1840 in Chieti – March 12, 1911 in Rome) was an Italian jurist, professor, and politician in the Kingdom of Italy. He was also one of the founding members of the Institut de Droit International.

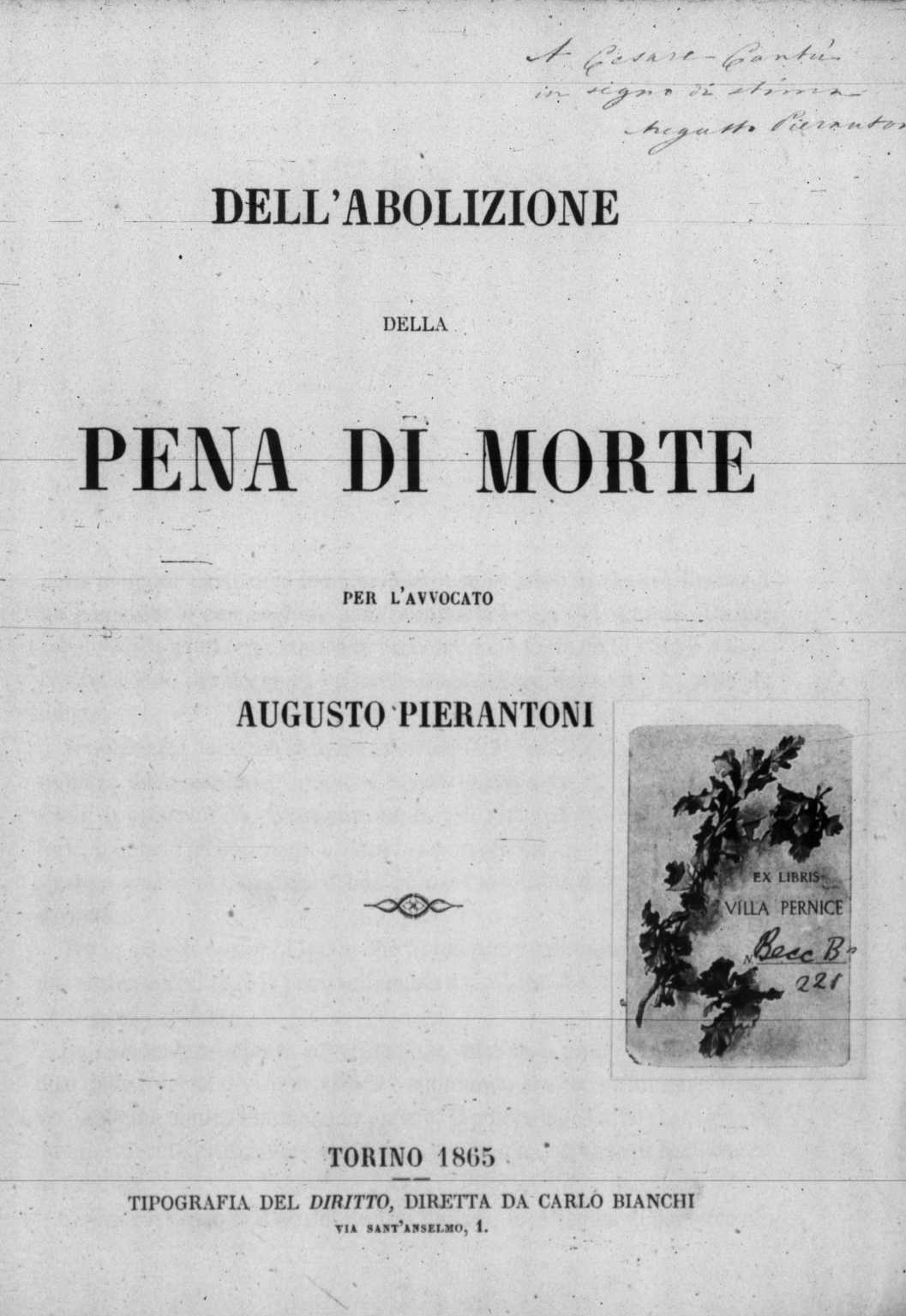
Dell'abolizione della pena di morte, 1865

== Professional life ==
Pierantoni was Ministerial Secretary in Turin, and later a professor of constitutional law and international law at the Universities of Modena (1865), Naples (1871) and Rome (1876). He also was a member of the Italian Senate in 1883. In 1885 he represented his country at the Paris Conference on shipping in the Suez Canal.

In September 1873, together with ten other lawyers from various countries he founded the Institut de Droit International in the Belgian city of Ghent. This was a private organization concerned with the development of international law. For his work in international law, he was nominated for the Nobel Peace Prize in 1904, but the Institut as a whole received the award for that year.

== Personal life ==
He was married in 1868 to the poet Grazia Mancini, a daughter of the lawyer Pasquale Stanislao Mancini who was also a founder of the Institut de Droit International and its first president.

== Works ==
- Anna di Messina, 1860 (historical drama).
- Dell'abolizione della pena di morte (in Italian). Torino: Tip. del diritto. 1865. (On the Abolition of the Death Penalty)
- Il progresso del diritto pubblico e delle genti (The Progress of Public Law of Nations), Modena 1866; German translation, Vahlen, Berlin 1899
- Il giuramento: storia, legge, politica (The oath: history, law, politics), Rome 1883
- Gli avvocati di Roma antica (The Lawyers of Ancient Rome), Zanichelli, Bologna 1900
- Storia degli studi del diritto internazionale in Italia (History of Studies of International Law in Italy), Florence 1902
