= Karl von Gareis =

German jurist and politician (1844–1923)

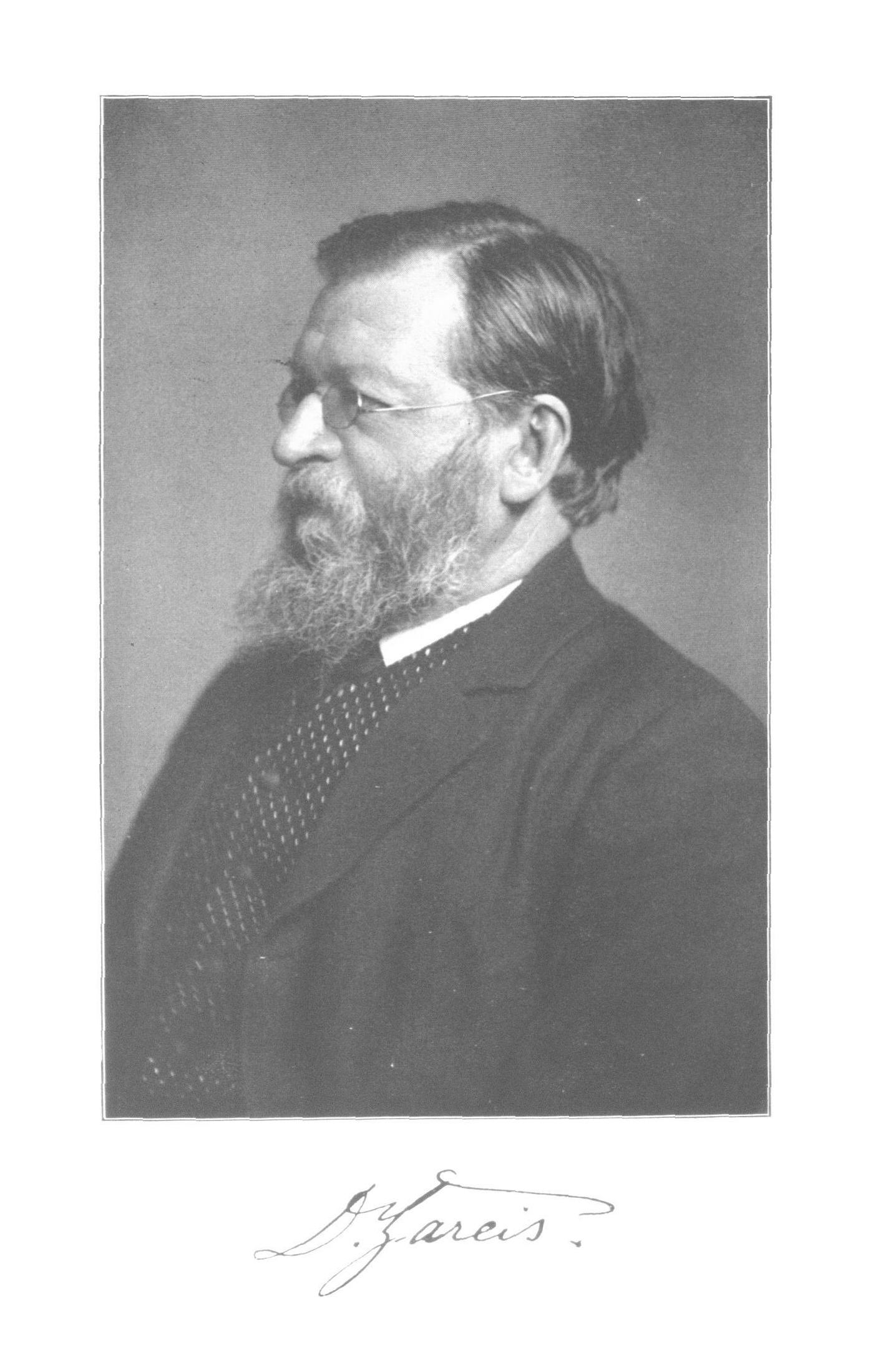
Karl von Gareis

Karl Heinrich Franz von Gareis (24 April 1844 in Bamberg – 15 January 1923 in Munich) was a German legal scholar and Old Catholic writer.

He studied law at the Ludwig-Maximilians-Universität München, Heidelberg University, and the University of Würzburg, obtaining his habilitation for private law at the University of Würzburg in 1870. In 1873, he became a law professor at the University of Bern, specializing in private law. Later on, he served as professor at the University of Giessen (from 1875), the University of Königsberg (from 1888), and the Ludwig-Maximilians-Universität München (from 1902). From 1878 to 1881, he was a member of the National Liberal Party in the German Reichstag.

Since 2009, the "Carl-Gareis-Preis" is awarded by the University of Bayreuth's Faculty of Law and Economics for outstanding dissertations in the field of legal history or intellectual property.

== Published works ==
In 1887 he published a monograph on concepts and methods in legal science, Enzyclopädie und Methodologie der Rechtswissenschaft: Einleitung in die Rechtswissenschaft, whose third edition 1905 was translated into English by Albert Kocourek, with an introduction by Roscoe Pound, as Introduction to the Science of Law: Systematic Survey of the Law and Principles of Legal Study (1911, reissued 1968).

Other principal writings by Gareis are:

- Staat und Kirche in der Schweiz (1877)
- Allgemeines Staatsrecht (1883)
- Institutionen des Völkerrechts (1888)
- Die Litteratur des Privat- und Handelsrechts: 1884 bis 1894 (1896)
- Deutsches Kolonialrecht (1902)
- Vom Begriff Gerechtigkeit (1907)

He was also an editor of the journal Blätter für Rechtsanwendung.
