= Giovanni Giacomo Pierantoni =

Italian mathematician

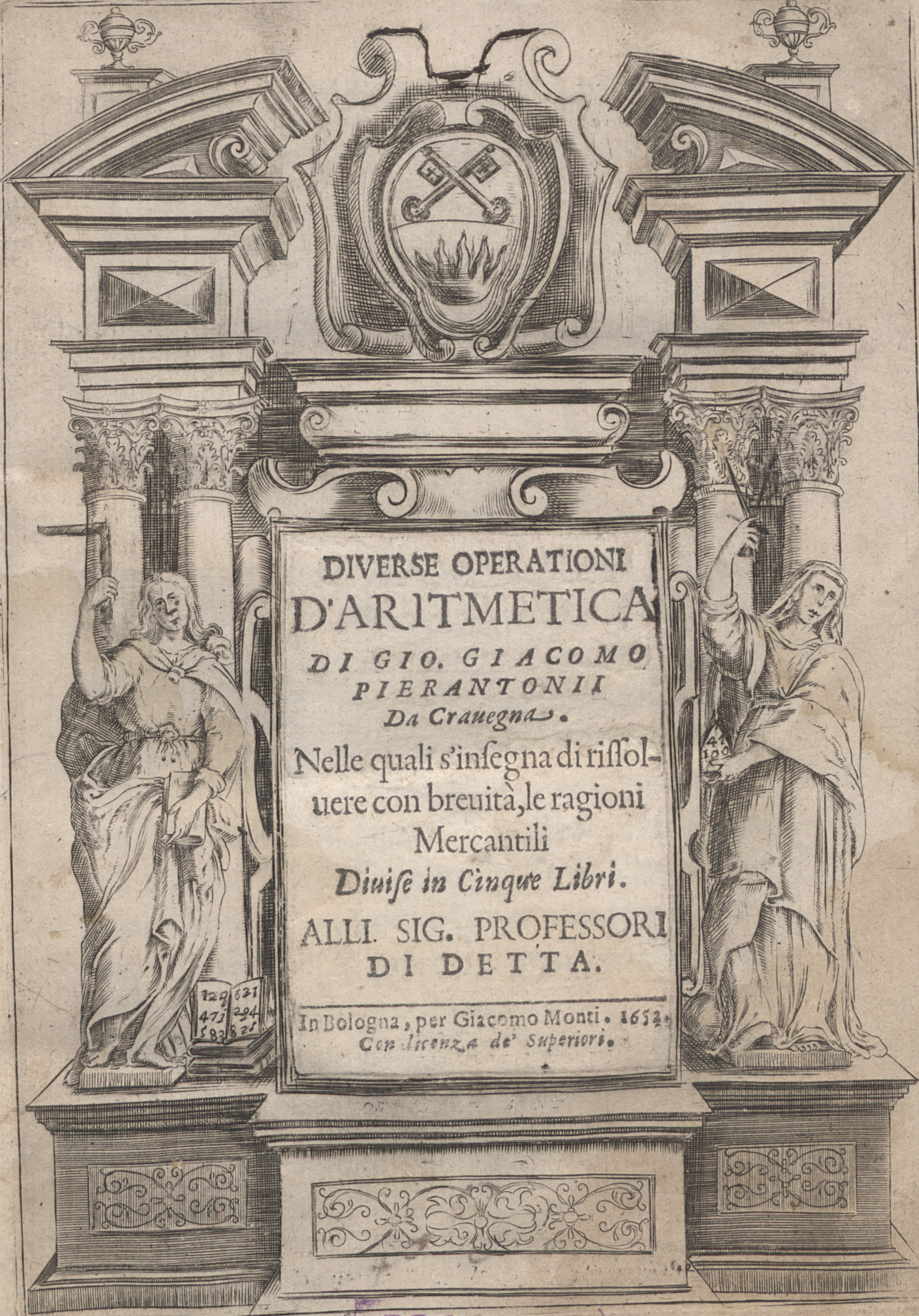
Title page of the 1652 Diverse operationi d'aritmetica

Giovanni Giacomo Pierantoni, also known as Gio. Giacomo Pierantoni, was a 17th-century Italian mathematician.

== Works ==
- Diverse operationi d'aritmetica (in Italian). Bologna: Giacomo Monti. 1652.
