= Grazia Pierantoni-Mancini =

Italian writer

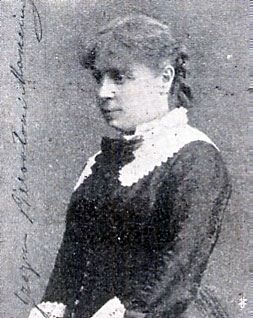
Grazia Pierantoni-Mancini

Grazia Pierantoni-Mancini (1841-1843–1915) was an Italian writer and the wife of Augusto Pierantoni.
