= Hippolyte Rolin =

Belgian politician

Hippolyte Rolin (born Kortrijk 6 September 1804; died Ghent 8 March 1888) was a lawyer and Belgian Minister of Public Works 1848–1850.

Rolin studied at the University of Ghent where he finished his studies in 1827 with distinction. He then studied further in Berlin where he attended seminars of Savigny and Hegel.

He married the daughter of Jean-Baptiste Hellebaut, a renowned professor and lawyer. The couple had 18 children. Hippolyte Rolin was the father of Gustave Rolin-Jaequemyns and of Albéric Rolin, and the uncle by marriage of Joseph Hellebaut.

He defended the Orangists before the Brussels Court. He also had a political career as a municipal councillor, alderman, president of the Liberal Association of Ghent, and as Minister of Public Works from 1848 to 1850.

During his tenure as Minister of Public Works, Rolin was responsible for the creation of the first Belgian postage stamp, the so-called Epaulettes type, in 1849.

== Writings ==
- Of delictorum probatione, Ghent, 1826.
- Of juridictione judicum nostrorum erga extraneos, 1827.
