= Institute of International Law =

International academic association

- Institut de Droit International
- Abbreviation: IIL, IDI
- Formation: 8 September 1873; 152 years ago
- Founded at: Ghent, Belgium
- Type: NGO, IGO, Society
- Legal status: Institute
- Purpose: Promote the progress of international law
- Headquarters: Geneva, Switzerland
- Coordinates: 46.220722°N 6.143681°E
- Region served: Worldwide
- Methods: Scientific research, publications, teaching and lobbying
- Fields: International law
- Secretary-General: Marcelo Kohen
- Affiliations: Consultant – ECOSOC; Consultant – HCCH
- Website: www.idi-iil.org

The Institute of International Law (French: Institut de Droit International) is an organization devoted to the study and development of international law, whose membership comprises the world's leading public international lawyers. Established in 1873, it was awarded the Nobel Peace Prize in 1904.

== History ==
The institute was founded by Gustave Moynier and Gustave Rolin-Jaequemyns, together with nine other renowned international lawyers, on 8 September 1873 in the Salle de l'Arsenal of the Ghent Town Hall in Belgium. The founders of 1873 were:

- Pasquale Stanislao Mancini (from Rome), President
- Emile de Laveleye (from Liege)
- Tobias Michael Carel Asser (from Amsterdam)
- James Lorimer (from Edinburgh)
- Wladimir Besobrassof (from Saint-Petersburg)
- Gustave Moynier (from Geneva)
- Jean Gaspar Bluntschli (from Heidelberg)
- Augusto Pierantoni (from Naples)
- Carlos Calvo (from Buenos Aires)
- Gustave Rolin-Jaequemyns (from Ghent)
- David Dudley Field (from New York)

In addition, August von Bulmerincq (from Tartu) was invited to participate at the founding event, but could not attend since the invitation did not reach him in time. He was later however counted among the founding members.

=== 150 years anniversary ===
In September 2023, the Institute celebrated its 150 year anniversary on the occasion of the 81st session that took place in Angers, France. For the occasion, three French government ministers were invited to participate in the session and video messages from President of France Emmanuel Macron and United Nations Secretary-General António Guterres, were presented during the ceremony. During this session, the Institute also launched a documentary film about the history of the organization. This documentary features many prominent international legal scholars as well as current judges at the International Court of Justice.

== Organization ==
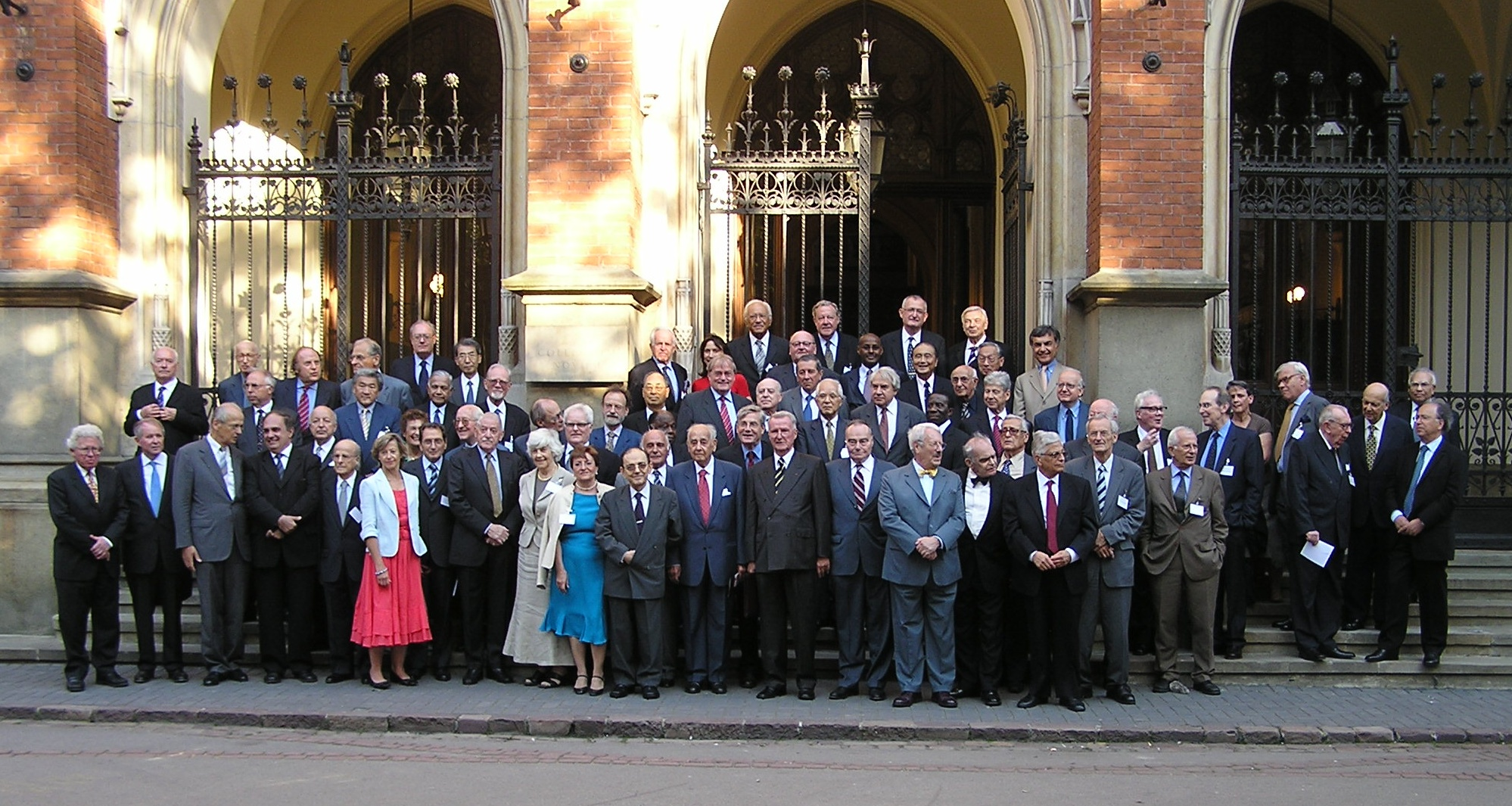
Members of the Institute at the 2005 Kraków Session

The Institute is a private body, made up of associates, members, and honorary members. The Statute stipulates that the number of members and associates under the age of 80 cannot be over 132. The members, elected every two years by the current members of the organization, are persons who have demonstrated notable scholarly work in the area of international law, and is restricted to those who are considered relatively free of political pressure. The organisation attempts to have members broadly distributed around the world.

The organisation holds biannual congresses for the study of international law as it currently exists, and passes resolutions proposing modifications to international law. It does not comment on specific disputes.

While its recommendations cover international law in its many forms, some of its resolutions particularly pertain to human rights law and peaceful dispute resolution. It was for that reason that the organization received the Nobel Peace Prize.

The organization remains active, with the latest congress held in Angers, France, in August 2023. The location of the institute's headquarters rotates according to the origin of the Secretary-General. The current headquarters are at the Graduate Institute of International and Development Studies in Geneva, Switzerland.

Current members of the Institute include, prominent lawyers, legal academics, former ambassadors, and judges of the International Court of Justice and the International Tribunal for the Law of the Sea.

Recent resolutions from the organization cover many important areas such as universal jurisdiction, provisional measures, regime of wrecks, immunity, environment, use of force, etc.

The Institute publishes its Yearbook, containing the reports of the commissions, deliberations of the plenary sessions, and any resulting declarations and resolutions. The records of the administrative sessions including elections are also included in the Yearbook.

The Institute's website houses an online library of information, including, but not limited to, declarations, resolutions, and some works in progress for future inclusion in the Yearbook.
