= List of Balzan Prize recipients =

This is a list of recipients of the Balzan Prize, one of the world's most prestigious academic awards. The International Balzan Prize Foundation awards four annual monetary prizes to people or organizations who have made outstanding achievements in the humanities, natural sciences, culture, and peace on an international level. The Prizes are awarded in four subject areas: "two in literature, the moral sciences and the arts" and "two in the physical, mathematical and natural sciences and medicine." The special Prize for Humanity, Peace and Fraternity is presented at intervals of every three years or longer.

== 1960s–1970s ==
1961

- Nobel Foundation (Sweden) --- Humanity, peace and brotherhood among peoples

1962

- Andrey Kolmogorov (Soviet Union) --- Mathematics
- Karl von Frisch (Austria) --- Biology
- Paul Hindemith (Germany) --- Music
- Samuel Eliot Morison (United States) --- History
- Pope John XXIII (Vatican) --- Humanity, peace and brotherhood among peoples

1978

- Mother Teresa of Calcutta (India) --- Humanity, peace and brotherhood among peoples

1979

- Ernest Labrousse (France) and Giuseppe Tucci (Italy) --- History
- Jean Piaget (Switzerland) --- Social and political sciences
- Torbjörn Caspersson (Sweden) --- Biology

== 1980s ==
1980

- Enrico Bombieri (Italy) --- Mathematics
- Hassan Fathy (Egypt) --- Architecture and town planning
- Jorge Luis Borges (Argentina) --- Philology, linguistics and literary criticism

1981

- Dan McKenzie (United Kingdom), Drummond Matthews (United Kingdom) and Frederick Vine (United Kingdom) --- Geology and geophysics
- Josef Pieper (Germany) --- Philosophy
- Paul Reuter (France) --- International public law

1982

- Jean-Baptiste Duroselle (France) --- Social sciences
- Kenneth Vivian Thimann (United Kingdom / United States) --- Pure and applied botany
- Massimo Pallottino (Italy) --- Sciences of antiquity

1983

- Edward Shils (United States) --- Sociology
- Ernst Mayr (Germany / United States) --- Zoology
- Francesco Gabrieli (Italy) --- Oriental studies

1984

- Jan Hendrik Oort (Netherlands) --- Astrophysics
- Jean Starobinski (Switzerland) --- History and criticism of the literatures
- Sewall Wright (United States) --- Genetics

1985

- Ernst H. J. Gombrich (Austria / United Kingdom) --- History of western art
- Jean-Pierre Serre (France) --- Mathematics

1986

- Jean Rivero (France) --- Basic human rights
- Otto Neugebauer (Austria / United States) --- History of science
- Roger Revelle (United States) --- Oceanography / climatology
- United Nations High Commissioner for Refugees (UNHCR) --- Humanity, peace and brotherhood among peoples

1987

- Jerome Seymour Bruner (United States) --- Human psychology
- Phillip V. Tobias (South Africa) --- Physical anthropology
- Richard W. Southern (United Kingdom) --- Medieval history

1988

- Michael Evenari (Israel) and Otto Ludwig Lange (Germany) --- Applied botany (incl. ecological aspects)
- René Étiemble (France) --- Comparative literature
- Shmuel Noah Eisenstadt (Israel) --- Sociology

1989

- Emmanuel Lévinas (France / Lithuania) --- Philosophy
- Leo Pardi (Italy) --- Ethologie
- Martin John Rees (United Kingdom) --- High energy astrophysics

== 1990s ==
1990

- James Freeman Gilbert (United States) --- Geophysics (solid earth)
- Pierre Lalive d'Epinay (Switzerland) --- Private international law
- Walter Burkert (Germany) --- Study of the ancient world (Mediterranean area)

1991

- György Ligeti (Hungary / Austria) --- Music
- John Maynard Smith (United Kingdom) --- Genetics and evolution
- Vitorino Magalhães Godinho (Portugal) --- History: The emergence of Europe in the 15th and 16th centuries
- Abbé Pierre (Henri Grouès) (France) --- Humanity, peace and brotherhood among peoples

1992

- Armand Borel (Switzerland) --- Mathematics
- Ebrahim M. Samba (Gambia) --- Preventive medicine
- Giovanni Macchia (Italy) --- History and criticism of the literatures

1993

- Jean Leclant (France) --- Art and archaeology of the ancient world
- Lothar Gall (Germany) --- History: societies of the 19th and 20th centuries
- Wolfgang H. Berger (Germany / United States) --- Paleontology with special reference to oceanography

1994

- Fred Hoyle (United Kingdom) and Martin Schwarzschild (Germany / United States) --- Astrophysics (evolution of stars)
- Norberto Bobbio (Italy) --- Law and political science (governments and democracy)
- René Couteaux (France) --- Biology (cell structure with special reference to the nervous system)

1995

- Alan J. Heeger (United States) --- Science of new non-biological materials
- Carlo M. Cipolla (Italy) --- Economic history
- Yves Bonnefoy (France) --- Art history and art criticism (as applied to European art from the Middle Ages to our times)

1996

- Arno Borst (Germany) --- History: medieval cultures
- Arnt Eliassen (Norway) --- Meteorology
- Stanley Hoffmann (Austria / United States / France) --- Political sciences: contemporary international relations
- International Committee of the Red Cross (ICRC) --- Humanity, peace and brotherhood among peoples

1997

- Charles Coulston Gillispie (United States) --- History and philosophy of science
- Stanley Jeyaraja Tambiah (Sri Lanka / United States) --- Social sciences: social anthropology
- Thomas Wilson Meade (United Kingdom) --- Epidemiology

1998

- Andrzej Walicki (Poland / United States) --- History: the cultural and social history of the Slavonic world from the reign of Catherine the Great to the Russian revolutions of 1917
- Harmon Craig (United States) --- Geochemistry
- Robert McCredie May (United Kingdom / Australia) --- Biodiversity

1999

- John Elliott (United Kingdom) --- History 1500–1800
- Luigi Luca Cavalli-Sforza (Italy / United States) --- Science of human origins
- Mikhail Gromov (Russia / France) --- Mathematics
- Paul Ricœur (France) --- Philosophy

== 2000s ==
2000

- Ilkka Hanski (Finland) --- Ecological sciences
- Martin Litchfield West (United Kingdom) --- Classical antiquity
- Michael Stolleis (Germany) --- Legal history since 1500
- Michel G.E. Mayor (Switzerland) --- Instrumentation and techniques in astronomy and astrophysics
- Abdul Sattar Edhi (Pakistan) --- Humanity, peace and brotherhood among peoples

2001

- Claude Lorius (France) --- Climatology
- James Sloss Ackerman (United States) --- History of architecture (including town planning and landscape design)
- Jean-Pierre Changeux (France) --- Cognitive neurosciences
- Marc Fumaroli (France) --- Literary history and criticism (post 1500)

2002

- Anthony Grafton (United States) --- History of the humanities
- Dominique Schnapper (France) --- Sociology
- Walter J. Gehring (Switzerland) --- Developmental biology
- Xavier Le Pichon (France) --- Geology

2003

- Eric Hobsbawm (United Kingdom) --- European history since 1900
- Reinhard Genzel (Germany) --- Infrared astronomy
- Serge Moscovici (France) --- Social psychology
- Wen-Hsiung Li (Taiwan / United States) --- Genetics and evolution

2004

- Andrew Colin Renfrew (United Kingdom) --- Prehistoric Archaeology
- Michael Marmot (United Kingdom) --- Epidemiology
- Nikki R. Keddie (United States) --- The Islamic world from the end of the 19th to the end of the 20th century
- Pierre Deligne (Belgium) --- Mathematics
- Community of Sant'Egidio --- Humanity, peace and brotherhood among peoples

2005

- Lothar Ledderose (Germany) --- History of the art of Asia
- Peter Hall (United Kingdom) --- The social and cultural history of cities since the beginning of the 16th century
- Peter R. Grant (United Kingdom) and Rosemary Grant (United States) --- Population biology
- Russell J. Hemley (United States) and Ho-kwang (David) Mao (China) --- Mineral physics

2006

- Ludwig Finscher (Germany) --- History of western music since 1600
- Quentin Skinner (United Kingdom) --- Political thought: history and theory
- Andrew Lange (United States) and Paolo de Bernardis (Italy) --- Observational astronomy and astrophysics
- Elliott M. Meyerowitz (United States) and Christopher R. Somerville (Canada) --- Plant molecular genetics

2007

- Sumio Iijima (Japan) --- Nanoscience
- Bruce A. Beutler (United States) and Jules A. Hoffmann (France) --- Innate Immunity
- Michel Zink (France) --- European Literature (1000–1500)
- Rosalyn Higgins (United Kingdom) --- International Law since 1945
- Karlheinz Böhm (Austria) --- Humanity, peace and brotherhood among peoples

2008

- Maurizio Calvesi (Italy) --- The Visual Arts since 1700
- Thomas Nagel (Serbia / United States) --- Moral Philosophy
- Ian H. Frazer (Australia) --- Preventive Medicine, including Vaccination
- Wallace S. Broecker (United States) --- Science of Climate Change

2009

- Terence Cave (United Kingdom) --- Literature since 1500
- Michael Grätzel (Germany / Switzerland) --- Science of New Materials
- Brenda Milner (United Kingdom / Canada) --- Cognitive Neurosciences
- Paolo Rossi Monti (Italy) --- History of Science

== 2010s ==
2010

- Manfred Brauneck (Germany) --- History of theatre in all its aspects
- Carlo Ginzburg (Italy) --- European History (1400–1700)
- Jacob Palis (Brazil) --- Mathematics (pure or applied)
- Shinya Yamanaka (Japan) --- Stem Cells: Biology and potential applications

2011

- Peter Brown (Ireland) --- Ancient History (The Graeco-Roman World)
- Bronislaw Baczko (Poland) --- Enlightenment Studies
- Russell Scott Lande (United States / United Kingdom) --- Theoretical Biology or Bioinformatics
- Joseph Ivor Silk (United States / United Kingdom) --- The Early Universe (From the Planck Time to the First Galaxies)

2012

- Ronald Dworkin (United States) --- Jurisprudence
- Reinhard Strohm (Germany) --- Musicology
- Kurt Lambeck (Australia) --- Solid Earth Sciences, with emphasis on interdisciplinary research
- David Baulcombe (United Kingdom) --- Epigenetics

2013

- André Vauchez (France) --- Medieval History
- Manuel Castells (Spain) --- Sociology
- Alain Aspect (France) --- Quantum Information Processing and Communication
- Pascale Cossart (France) --- Infectious diseases: basic and clinical aspects

2014

- Mario Torelli (Italy) --- Classical Archaeology
- Ian Hacking (Canada) --- Epistemology and Philosophy of Mind
- G. David Tilman (United States) --- Basic and/or applied Plant Ecology
- Dennis Sullivan (United States) --- Mathematics (pure or applied)
- Vivre en Famille (France) --- Humanity, peace and brotherhood among peoples

2015

- Hans Belting (Germany) --- History of European Art (1300–1700)
- Joel Mokyr (Netherland / United States / Israel) --- Economic History
- Francis Halzen (Belgium / United States) --- Astroparticle Physics including neutrino and gamma-ray observation
- David Karl (United States) --- Oceanography

2016

- Piero Boitani (Italy) --- Comparative Literature
- Reinhard Jahn (Germany) --- Molecular and Cellular Neuroscience, including neurodegenerative and developmental aspects
- Federico Capasso (Italy) --- Applied Photonics
- Robert Keohane (United States) --- International Relations: History and Theory

2017

- Aleida Assmann (Germany) and Jan Assmann (Germany) --- Collective Memory
- Bina Agarwal (India / United Kingdom) --- Gender Studies
- Robert D. Schreiber (United States) and James P. Allison (United States) --- Immunological Approaches in Cancer Therapy
- Michaël Gillon (Belgium) --- The Sun's Planetary System and Exoplanets

2018

- Éva Kondorosi (Hungary / France) --- Chemical Ecology
- Detlef Lohse (Germany) --- Fluid Dynamics
- Jürgen Osterhammel (Germany) --- Global History
- Marilyn Strathern (United Kingdom) --- Social Anthropology
- Terre des hommes Foundation (Switzerland) --- Humanity, Peace and Fraternity among Peoples

2019

- Jacques Aumont (France) --- Film Studies
- Michael Cook (United States / United Kingdom) --- Islamic Studies
- Luigi Ambrosio (Italy) --- Theory of Partial Differential Equations
- Erika von Mutius, Klaus F. Rabe, Werner Seeger and Tobias Welte (all Germany) --- Pathophysiology of respiration: from basic sciences to the bedside

== 2020s ==
2020

- Susan Trumbore (US / Germany) --- Earth System Dynamics
- Jean-Marie Tarascon (France) --- Environmental Challenges: Materials Science for Renewable Energy
- Joan Martinez Alier (Spain) --- Environmental Challenges: Responses from the Social Sciences and the Humanities
- Antônio Augusto Cançado Trindade (Brazil) --- Human Rights

2021

- Saul Friedländer (France / US) --- Holocaust and Genocide Studies
- Jeffrey I. Gordon (US) --- Microbiome in Health and Disease
- Alessandra Buonanno (Italy / US) and Thibault Damour (France) --- Gravitation: physical and astrophysical aspects
- Giorgio Buccellati and Marilyn Kelly-Buccellati (Italy / USA) --- Art and Archaeology of the Ancient Far East

2022

- Robert Langer (US) --- Biomaterials for Nanomedicine and Tissue Engineering
- Martha Nussbaum (US) --- Moral Philosophy
- Dorthe Dahl-Jensen (Denmark) and Hans Oerlemans (Netherlands) --- Glaciation and Ice-Sheet Dynamics
- Philip Bohlman (US) --- Ethnomusicology

2023

- David Damrosch (US) --- World Literature
- Jean-Jacques Hublin (France) --- Evolution of Humankind: Paleoanthropology
- Eske Willerslev (Denmark) --- Evolution of Humankind: Ancient DNA and Human Evolution
- Heino Falcke (Germany) --- High resolution images: from planetary to cosmic objects

2024

- John Braithwaite (Australia) --- Restorative Justice
- Lorraine Daston (US / Germany) --- History of Modern and Contemporary Science
- Michael N. Hall (US / Switzerland) --- Biological Mechanisms of Ageing
- Omar M. Yaghi (US) --- Nanoporous Materials for Environmental Applications

2025

- Josiah Ober (US) --- Athenian Democracy Revisited
- Rosalind Krauss (US) --- History of Contemporary Art
- Christophe Salomon (France) --- Atoms and Ultra-Precise Measurement of Time
- Carl H. June (US) --- Gene and Gene-Modified Cell Therapy

2026

- Elena Esposito (Italy) --- The Social Science of Digital Technology
- Rasmus Nielsen (Denmark) and Ziheng Yang (UK) --- Molecular Evolution: Decoding Patterns of Genomic Change
- David Nirenberg (USA) --- Jewish Studies
- Geoffrey W. Coates (USA) and Marc A. Hillmyer (USA) --- Biodegradable Polymers from Renewable Sources
- Emergency Response Rooms (Sudan) --- Humanity, Peace, and Fraternity among Peoples
