= Paul Reuter (disambiguation) =

Paul Reuter may refer to:

- Paul Julius Reuter (1816–1899) was a German-born British entrepreneur.
- Paul Reuter (1911–1990), European lawyer
- Paul Reuter (b. 1945), American composer
