= Stanley Jeyaraja Tambiah =

American anthropologist (1929–2014)

- Born: 16 January 1929; British Ceylon (now Sri Lanka)
- Died: 19 January 2014 (aged 85); Cambridge, Massachusetts, United States
- Education: University of Ceylon; Cornell University
- Awards: Balzan Prize (1997); Fukuoka Asian Culture Prize (1998)
- Scientific career
- Fields: Social anthropologist
- Workplaces: S. Thomas' College, Mount Lavinia; University of Ceylon; University of Cambridge; University of Chicago; Harvard University
- Doctoral students: Chris Fuller

Stanley Jeyaraja Tambiah (16 January 1929 – 19 January 2014) was a social anthropologist and Esther and Sidney Rabb Professor (Emeritus) of Anthropology at Harvard University. He specialised in studies of Thailand, Sri Lanka, and Tamils, as well as the anthropology of religion and politics.

== Biography ==
Tambiah was born in Sri Lanka to a Christian Tamil family. He attended S. Thomas' College, Mount Lavinia for his primary and secondary education. After finishing his undergraduate education at the University of Ceylon in 1951, he attended Cornell University, graduating in 1954 with a PhD. He began teaching sociology at the University of Ceylon in 1955, where he remained until 1960. After a few years as the UNESCO Teaching Assistant for Thailand, he taught at the University of Cambridge from 1963 to 1972 and at the University of Chicago from 1973 to 1976. He joined the faculty of Harvard University in 1976.

His earliest major published work was an ethno-historical study of modern and medieval Thailand. He then became interested in the comparative study of the ways Western categories of magic, science and religion have been used by anthropologists to make sense of other cultures which do not use this three-part system. After the outbreak of civil war in Sri Lanka, he began to study the role of competing religious and ethnic identities in that country. At Harvard, he trained several generations of anthropologists in a number of fields. He also served on the National Research Council's Committee for International Conflict Resolution. He did field research on the Organisation of Buddhist temples in Sri Lanka (Monks, Priests and Peasants, a Study of Buddhism and Social Structure in Central Ceylon and several papers in the American Anthropologists and the Journal of Asian Studies).

== Awards ==
In November 1997, Tambiah received the prestigious Balzan Prize for "penetrating social-anthropological analysis of the fundamental problems of ethnic violence in South East Asia and original studies on the dynamics of Buddhist societies [that] have opened the way to an innovative and rigorous social-anthropological approach to the internal dynamics of different civilizations". A month later, the Royal Anthropological Institute of Great Britain and Ireland awarded him its highest recognition, the Huxley Memorial Medal and Lecture. In September 1998, he was awarded the Fukuoka Asian Culture Prize by the city of Fukuoka, capital of Fukuoka Prefecture, Japan.

In 2000, he became a Corresponding Fellow of the British Academy, a title given to those who have "attained high international standing" in a discipline in the humanities or social sciences.

== Legacy and Impact ==
Scholars have drawn on Tambiah's work to theorize communal conflicts in many other settings, such as nineteenth-century Syria.

== Selected publications ==
- Buddhism and the Spirit Cults in North-East Thailand. Cambridge University Press, 1970. ISBN 978-0-521-09958-5.
- World Conqueror and World Renouncer : A Study of Buddhism and Polity in Thailand against a Historical Background (Cambridge Studies in Social and Cultural Anthropology). Cambridge University Press, 1976. ISBN 978-0-521-29290-0.
- The Buddhist Saints of the Forest and the Cult of Amulets. Cambridge University Press, 1984.
- Form and Meaning of Magical Acts, in "Culture, Thought, and Social Action: An Anthropological Perspective", Harvard University Press, 1985 [1973], pp. 60–86.
- Sri Lanka: Ethnic Fratricide and the Dismantling of Democracy, Chicago : University of Chicago Press, 1986. ISBN 978-0-226-78951-4
- Magic, Science and Religion and the Scope of Rationality (Lewis Henry Morgan Lectures). Cambridge University Press, 1990. ISBN 978-0-521-37631-0.
- Buddhism Betrayed? : Religion, Politics, and Violence in Sri Lanka (A Monograph of the World Institute for Development Economics Research). University of Chicago Press, 1992. ISBN 978-0-226-78950-7.
- Leveling Crowds : Ethnonationalist Conflicts and Collective Violence in South Asia. (Comparative Studies in Religion and Society). University of California Press, 1996. ISBN 978-0-520-20642-7.
- Edmund Leach: An Anthropological Life. Cambridge University Press, 2002. ISBN 978-0-521-52102-4.

== See also ==
- List of Balzan Prize recipients
