= Ethology Ecology & Evolution =

- Discipline: Ethology, ecology, evolutionary biology
- Language: English
- Edited by: Alberto Ugolini

Publication details
- Former name(s): Monitore Zoologico Italiano; Italian Journal of Zoology
- History: 1967-present
- Publisher: Taylor & Francis
- Frequency: Bimonthly
- Impact factor: 1.582 (2016)

Standard abbreviations
- ISO 4: Ethol. Ecol. Evol.

Indexing
- ISSN: 0394-9370 (print); 1828-7131 (web)
- LCCN: 90649346
- OCLC no.: 896846277
- Monitore Zoologico Italiano/Italian Journal of Zoology
- ISSN: 0026-9786

Links
- Journal homepage; Online access; Online archive

Ethology Ecology & Evolution is a bimonthly peer-reviewed scientific journal covering all aspects of the ecology, evolution or genetics of behaviour. It was established in 1890 as Monitore Zoologico Italiano, obtaining its current name in 1989, with volume numbering restarted at 1. It is published by Taylor & Francis and the editor-in-chief is Alberto Ugolini (University of Florence).

== A brief history ==
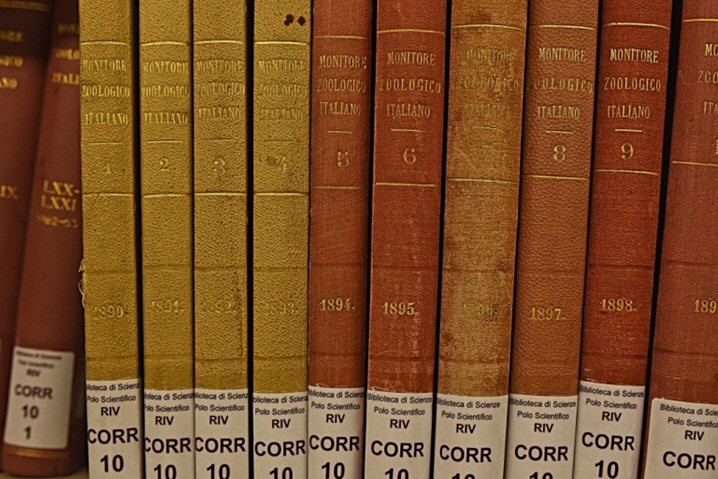
Volumes of the journal

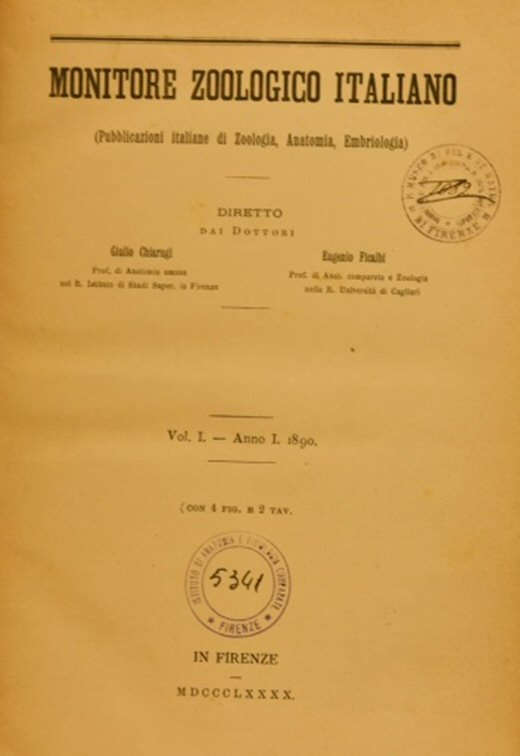
Front page of a volume of the journal

The journal was established in 1890 by Giulio Chiarugi and Eugenio Ficalbi (who edited it until 1922) as the Monitore Zoologico Italiano. From the start, a specific interest is declared for zoology, anatomy, and embryology. The Unione Zoologica Italiana was founded in 1900 and in the same year the Monitore became its official journal. In 1923 Ficalbi was succeeded by Angelo Senna. From 1930 to 1933 the journal also became the official journal of the Società Italiana di Anatomia. Since 1934 it is no longer the organ of the Unione Zoologica Italiana and from 1934 to 1966 it is only the organ of the Società Italiana di Anatomia of which the proceedings of the conferences are published. Until 1943 it was edited by Chiarugi and Senna. In 1944 Giuseppe Colosi took over and edited the journal until 1967. In addition to Colosi, in 1946 Nello Beccari and Senna joined as editors. In 1951 Ignazio Fazzari replaced Senna. From 1957 on, the editors were Colosi, Fazzari, and Emanuele Padoa. In 1962 Leo Pardi also became part of the editorial committee.

In 1967, under the direction of Pardi, the Monitore was published every three months, in English, with the advice of an international advisory board and with the subtitle of Italian Journal of Zoology, and was mainly addressed to Zoology and Ethology. In 1967 the number of directors rises to 6 with the entry of Alberto Monroy and Floriano Papi. In 1968 and 1970 Valdo Mazzi and Baccio Baccetti join the editorial committee. In 1975, Colosi dies. In 1982, the directors are Pardi, Papi, Baccetti, Fazzari and Antonio Ercolini.

In 1985 Fazzari is no longer in the group of directors. Since 1967, an annual Supplement of the Monitore has been published in relation to the development of zoology research in tropical areas (in particular Somalia following the foundation of the Centro di Studio per la Faunistica ed Ecologia Tropicali del Consiglio Nazionale delle Ricerche, directed by Pardi) The publication of the Supplement lasted until 1987, becoming independent magazine since 1988, with the name of Tropical Zoology. Starting from 1975 the Monitore Zoologico Italiano publishes a series of monographs focusing on themes of parasitology, herpetology, and ethology.

Since 1989 the Monitore becomes Ethology Ecology & Evolution, editor Francesco Dessì–Fulgheri. From 2010 it is published by Taylor & Francis. In 2015 Alberto Ugolini became editor-in-chief.

== Founders and editors ==
Giulio Charugi

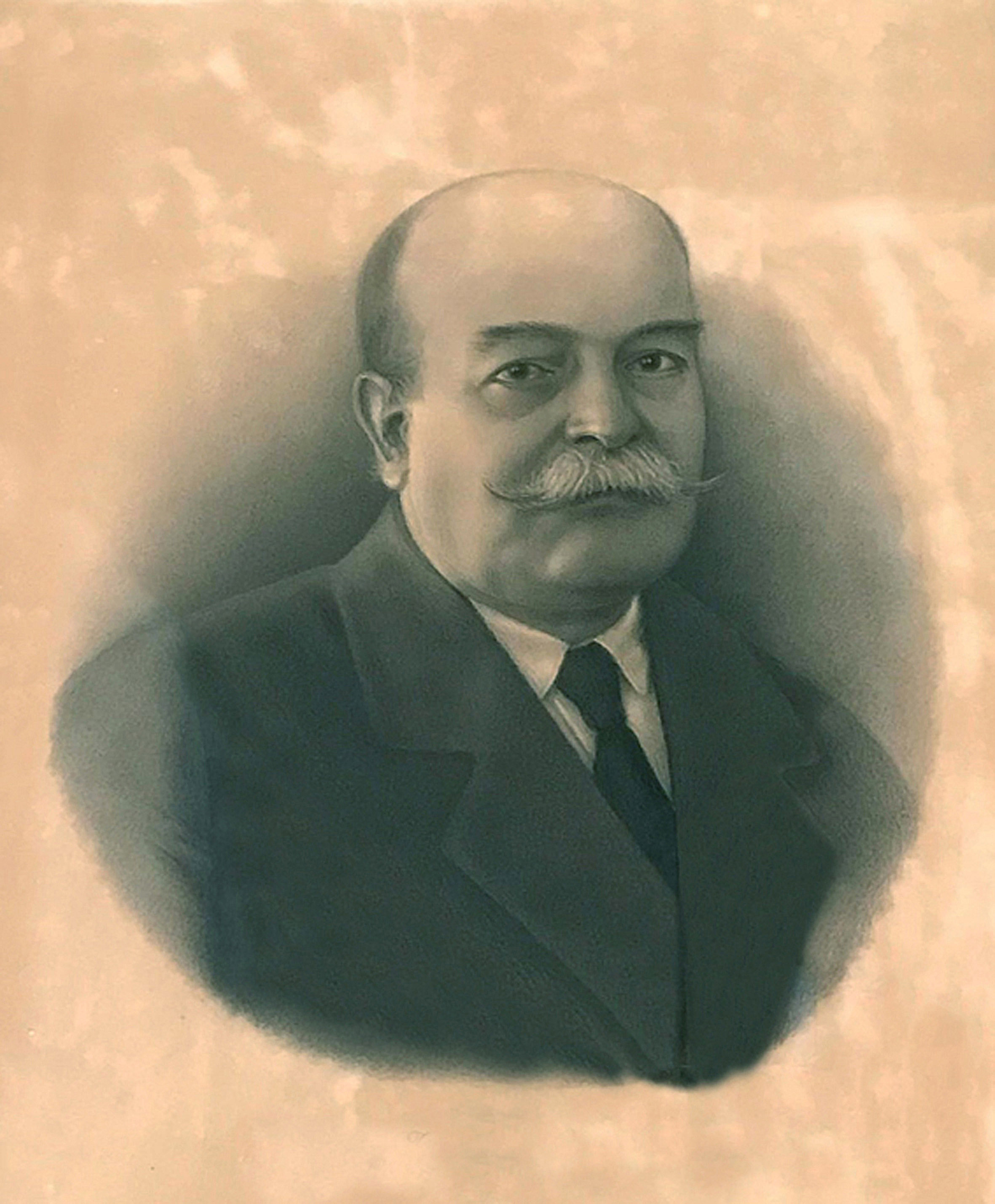
Eugenio Ficalbi

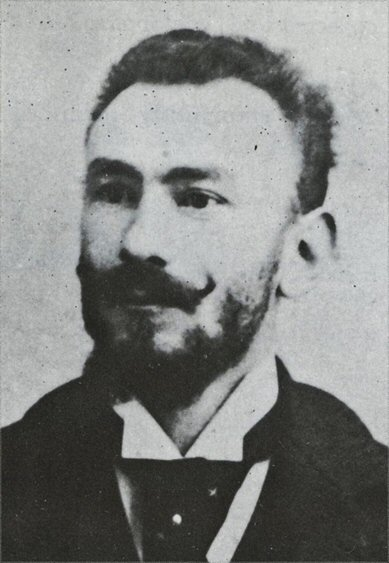
Angelo Senna

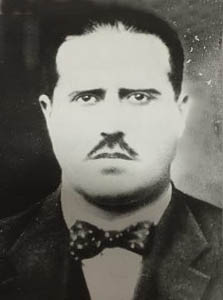
Nello Beccari

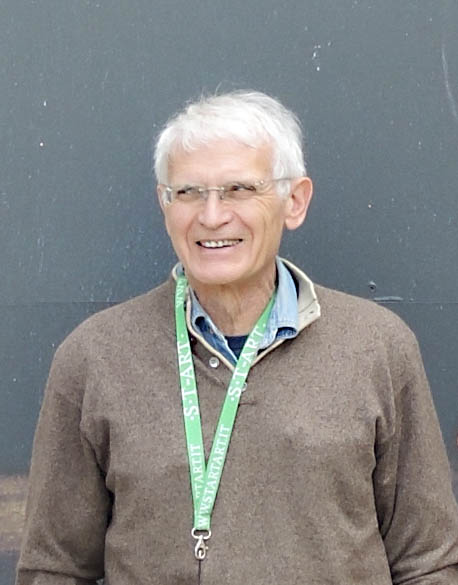
Francesco Dessì

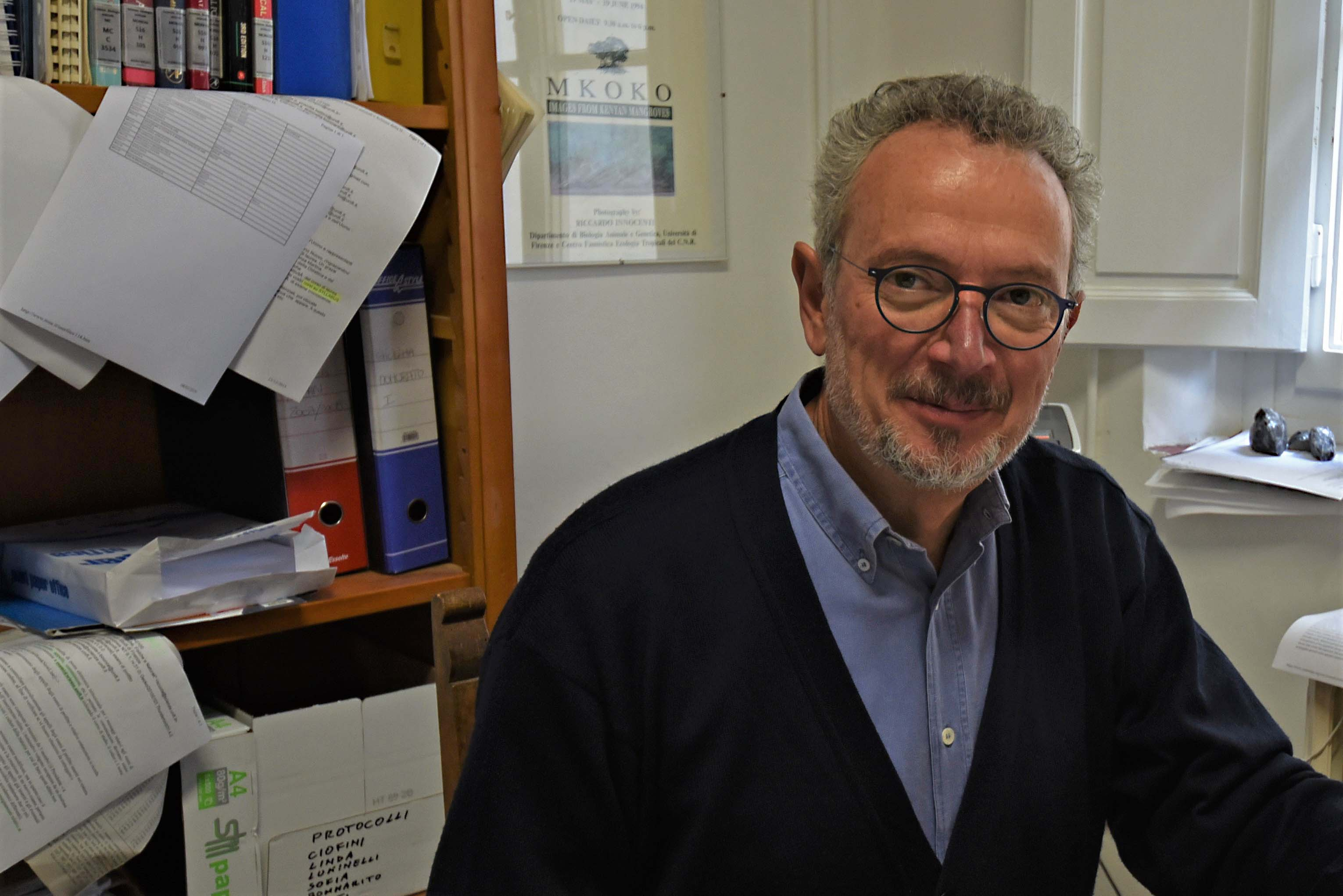
Alberto Ugolini

== Abstracting and indexing ==
The journal is abstracted and indexed in:

- Biological Abstracts
- BIOSIS Previews
- Current Contents/Agriculture, Biology & Environmental Sciences
- EBSCO databases
- Science Citation Index
- Scopus
- The Zoological Record

According to the Journal Citation Reports, the journal has a 2016 impact factor of 1.582.
