= David Karl =

American microbial biologist and oceanographer

- Born: May 9, 1950 (age 76); Buffalo, New York, USA
- Known for: Hawaii Ocean Time-series
- Awards: Balzan Prize (2015)

Academic background
- Education: BA, Biology, 1971, Buffalo State College; MS, Biological Oceanography, 1974, Florida State University; PhD, Oceanography, 1978, University of California, San Diego
- Thesis: A study of microbial biomass and metabolic activities in marine ecosystems: development of sensitive techniques and results of selective environmental studies (1978)

David Michael Karl (May 9, 1950) is an American microbial biologist and oceanographer. He is the Victor and Peggy Brandstrom Pavel Professor of Microbial Oceanography at the University of Hawaiʻi at Mānoa and the Director of the University Center for Microbial Oceanography: Research and Education.

== Early life and education ==
Karl was born on May 9, 1950, in Buffalo, New York. His parents were not college-educated but expected him and his siblings to attend college. Both his brother and sister became National Merit Scholars. Karl became interested in oceanography at a young age and was inspired by Arthur C. Clarke's book The Challenge of the Sea. He chose to pursue biology at Buffalo State College after climbing Cadillac Mountain in Maine. Karl paid his way through college working various "odd jobs" including in pizza parlor, at a cemetery, and unloading freight cars. Following his bachelor of arts degree, he taught high school algebra and general science in Buffalo before applying for graduate school at Florida State University. He earned his master's degree in Biological Oceanography within two years and attended Holger Jannasch’s summer course on microbial ecology at the Marine Biological Laboratory. In 1974, Karl drove across the country to the Scripps Institution of Oceanography, who rejected him four times before finally accepting him for his doctoral degree.

== Career ==
Upon receiving his doctoral degree, Karl accepted an assistant professor of oceanography position at the University of Hawaiʻi at Mānoa. While there, his doctoral dissertation received the Eckart Dissertation Prize awarded by Scripps Institution of Oceanography. During his first year at the institution, Karl was a member of the Galapagos Rift Biology Expedition and was among the first to observe and sample deep sea hydrothermal vent communities from a submersible. He was recognized for his research studying marine microecology by President Ronald Reagan who granted him an Presidential Young Investigator Award in the oceanographic and atmospheric fields in 1984. Two years later, prior to his 35th birthday, Karl was honored as "Scientist of the Year" by the Honolulu Chapter of the Achievement Howards for College Scientist and embarked on various national expeditions.

In 1988, Karl co-founded the Hawaii Ocean Time-series (HOT) program which conducts sustained physical, biogeochemical and microbial measurements and experiments at Station ALOHA, a circle of a 6-mile radius in the Pacific Ocean north of Hawaii. His efforts were recognized by the Bedford Institute of Oceanography with the A.G. Huntsman Award for Excellence in the Marine Sciences in 2001 and by the Gordon and Betty Moore Foundation in 2004 with their inaugural Investigator in Marine Science award. The award included a five-year, $3.85 million grant, which Karl said he'd use to train a few graduate and postgraduate students who "have the potential of each training 20 to 30 more students in their careers." In the same year, Karl received the Henry Bryant Bigelow Award in Oceanography and in recognition of his "contributions to the field of microbiology and study of the sea's microorganisms." He was also appointed the Chancellor‘s Distinguished Lecturer at Louisiana State University in September 2005 followed in November by the David Packard Medal from the Monterey Bay Aquarium Research Institute, given in recognition of outstanding achievements and leadership in the field of Marine Science. In April 2006, Karl was elected a member of the National Academy of Sciences.

Using data collected from the HOT program, Karl and added the manmade chemical methylphosphonate to samples of seawater, which immediately started making methane. His data helped prove that carbon dioxide emissions were making the ocean more acidic, which earned him the Cozzarelli Prize in 2010. He later led an international research team in the documentation of an increase in the amount of particulate matter exported to the deep sea in the North Pacific Gyre. That summer, he also developed an analytical technique to identify long-hypothesized vitamin B deficient zones in the ocean. His efforts were recognized the following year by the National Academy of Sciences with the Alexander Agassiz Medal for original contributions in the science of oceanography. Karl continued his research in the field of marine microbial ecology with Edward DeLong, using funding from the Gordon and Betty Moore Foundation, and was appointed to the National Academy of Sciences Gulf of Mexico program advisory group.

In 2015, Karl was the recipient of the Balzan Prize for "his fundamental contributions to the understanding of the role and immense importance of microorganisms in the ocean, and of how microorganisms and phytoplankton control the oceanic carbon, nitrogen and iron cycles, work that has yielded significant insights into global change." He also received the DuPont Award for outstanding accomplishment in microbiology. He later led a research team in collaboration with Chalmers University of Technology to develop a computer model to study the survival of Prochlorococcus, an abundant photosynthetic microbe. In 2019, Karl stepped down as leader of the HOT program, being replaced by oceanographer Angelicque White, but stayed on as co-investigator.
