= Colosi =

Colosi is an Italian surname. Notable people with the surname include:

- Giuseppe Colosi (1892–1975), Italian zoologist
- Nick Colosi (1927–2005), Italian-American baseball umpire
