= Chiarugi =

Chiarugi is an Italian surname. Notable people with the surname include:

- Alberto Chiarugi (1901–1960), Italian botanist
- Giulio Chiarugi (1859–1944), Italian anatomist and embryologist
- Luciano Chiarugi (born 1947), Italian footballer and manager
- Vincenzo Chiarugi (1759–1820), Italian physician
