= Elena Esposito =

Italian sociologist (born 1960)

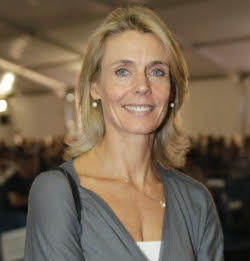
Elena Esposito at the Festival della Filosofia in Modena 2010

Elena Esposito (born 1960, Milan) is an Italian sociologist who works in the field of social systems theory. She teaches subjects such as general sociology, foresight, and the futures of public policy at Bielefeld University (Germany) and the University of Bologna (Italy). Her research is inspired by Luhmannian social systems theory.

== Education ==
Elena Esposito studied sociology at the University of Bologna (1983). At the same university, she earned a Laurea in Philosophy under the supervision of Umberto Eco (1987). She earned a PhD in sociology at Bielefeld University with a thesis on the operation of observation in constructivism. Her PhD supervisor was Niklas Luhmann.

== Research ==
Elena Esposito's research focuses on five main topics: General systems theory, Social memory, Fashion, Finance, and Algorithms and web.

== Academic appointments ==
Elena Esposito is a Full Professor at the Fakultät für Soziologie of the University of Bielefeld and a Full Professor at the Department of Political and Social Sciences of the University of Bologna. She was visiting scholar at the Max Planck Institute for the History of Science, Berlin (2017) and Niklas Luhmann Distinguished Visiting Chair in Social Theory, University Bielefeld (2015–16). Elena Esposito is member of the editorial board of Sociologica (since 2014). She was a member of the board of Soziale Systeme (2000–2006). She is also evaluator of the Deutscher Akademischer Austausch Dienst (DAAD) (since 2015) and advisor of the Zentrum für interdisziplinären Forschung (ZiF) of the University Bielefeld (since 2014). In 2019, Elena Esposito received an advanced grant by the European Research Council for the research project "The Future of Prediction: Social Consequences of Algorithmic Forecast in Insurance, Medicine and Policing" (PREDICT - ERC-2018-ADG, n. 833749).

In 2026 she was awarded the Balzan Prize for The Social Science of Digital Technology.

== Publications ==
=== Books (selection) ===
- Kommunikation mit unverständlichen Maschinen. Wien: Residenz Verlag.
- Artificial Communication] How Algorithms Produce Social Intelligence. Cambridge (MA): The MIT Press, 2022.
- Ontologien der Moderne (with René John and Jana Rückert-John, eds.), Wiesbaden: Springer VS, 2013.
- Il futuro dei futures. Il tempo del denaro nella finanza e nella società. Pisa: ETS, 2009. (German translation Die Zukunft der Futures. Die Zeit des Geldes in Finanzwelt und Gesellschaft. Heidelberg: Carl Auer, 2010. English translation: The Future of Futures. The Time of Money in Financing and Society. Cheltenham: Edward Elgar, 2011.)
- Die Fiktion der wahrscheinlichen Realität. Frankfurt a.M.: Suhrkamp 2007 (revised Italian translation Probabilità improbabili. La realtà della finzione nella società moderna. Roma: Meltemi, 2008.) ISBN 978-3-518-12485-7
- Die Verbindlichkeit des Vorübergehenden. Paradoxien der Mode. Suhrkamp: Frankfurt a.M., 2004. (Italian translation: I paradossi della moda. Originalità e transitorietà nella società moderna. Bologna: Baskerville, 2004.) ISBN 9783518583906
- La memoria sociale. Mezzi per comunicare e modi di dimenticare, Laterza, Roma-Bari, 2001 (extended German translation Soziales Vergessen. Formen und Medien des Gedächtnisses der Gesellschaft. Frankfurt a.M.: Suhrkamp 2002.)
- Luhmann In Glossario (with Claudio Baraldi and Giancarlo Corsi). Milano: Angeli, 1995 (Japanese translation Tokio: Kokubun-sha, 2013; German translation GLU. Glossar zu Niklas Luhmanns Theorie sozialer Systeme. Suhrkamp, Frankfurt a.M.,1997; Spanish translation GLU. Glosario sobre la teorìa social de Niklas Luhmann. Città del Messico-Gaudalajara-Barcellona: Universidad Iberoamericana, 1996; Korean and English translations forthcoming.)
- L’operazione di osservazione, Milano: Angeli, 1992.

=== Articles (selection) ===
- Critique without crisis: Systems theory as a critical sociology. Thesis Eleven 2017, 143(1): 18–27. https://doi.org/10.1177/0725513617740966
- Organizing without Understanding? Lists in Ancient and in Digital Cultures. Zeitschrift fur Literaturwissenschaft und Linguistik, 2017. https://doi.org/10.1007/s41244-017-0064-4.
- Artificial Communication? The Production of Contingency by Algorithms. Zeitschrift für Soziologie 2017, 46(4): 249–265. DOI: https://doi.org/10.1515/zfsoz-2017-1014
- An ecology of differences: Communication, the Web, and the question of borders. Pp. 283–301 in Erich Hörl and James Burton (Eds.), General Ecology. The New Ecological Paradigm. London/New York: Bloomsbury, 2017.
- Algorithmic memory and the right to be forgotten on the web. Big Data & Society, January–June 2017. DOI: 10.1177/2053951717703996.
- The fascination of contingency: Fashion and modern society. Pp. 175–190 in Giovanni Matteucci and Stefano Marino (Eds.), Philosophical perspectives on fashion. London/New York: Bloomsbury, 2017.
- Tools to Remember an Ever-changing Past. Pp. 335–344 in Alberto Cevolini (Ed.), Forgetting Machines: Knowledge Management Evolution in Early Modern Europe. Leiden/Boston: Brill, 2016. ISBN 978-90-04-32525-8
- ルーマン後の社会システム論と現代社会学(Ruman go no shakaishisutemuron to gendai shakaigaku). 現代思想, 2014(42–16): 75–85.
- Algorithmische Kontingenz. Der Umgang mit Unsicherheit im Web. pp. 233–249 in Alberto Cevolini, ed. Die Ordnung des Kontingenten. Beiträge zur zahlenmäßigen Selbstbeschreibung der modernen Gesellschaft. Wiesbaden: Springer VS, 2014.
- Economic Circularities and Second-Order Observation: The Reality of Ratings. Sociologica, 2/2013. doi: 10.2383/74851.
- Зацикленность экономики и наблюдения второго порядка: реальность рейтингов. Russian translation Экономическая социология. Т. 14. No. 4. Сентябрь 2013(14): 58–74.
- The structures of uncertainty. Performativity and unpredictability in economic operations. Economy & Society, 2013(42): 102–129.

=== Other texts (selection) ===
- Die Frivolität des Engagements und das Dilemma der ethnischen und frommen Mode. Frankfurter Allgemeine Quarterly, 2017 (3): 82–85.
- Realität der Zukunft und künftige Realität. Pp. 29–35 in Susanne Witzgall and Kerstin Stakemeier (Eds.), Die Gegenwart der Zukunft. Zürich-Berlin: Diaphanes, 2016.
- “Pläne helfen nicht, die geplante Zukunft zu realisieren”. Im Gespräch mit Elena Esposito und Nora Schultz. pp. 36–44 in Susanne Witzgall and Kerstin Stakemeier (Eds.), Die Gegenwart der Zukunft. Zürich-Berlin: Diaphanes, 2016.
- Die Konstruktion der Zeit in der zeitlosen Gegenwart. Frankfurt am Main: Max-Planck-Institut für europäische Rechtsgeschichte, 2007.

== Themes ==
In the introduction to her 2022 book Artificial Communication: How Algorithms Produce Social Intelligence, Elena Esposito characterizes the work as follows:

The book opens with a discussion on the adequacy of the classic metaphor of artificial intelligence, as well as derivatives such as neural networks, to analyze recent developments in digital technologies and the web. The latest generation of algorithms, which in various forms have given rise to the use of big data and related projects, does not try to artificially reproduce the processes of human intelligence. This, I argue, is neither a renunciation nor a weakness, but the basis of their incomparable efficiency in information processing and in their ability to interact with users. For the first time, machines are able to produce information never before considered by a human mind and act as interesting and competent communication partners—not because they have become intelligent; instead, it is because they no longer try to do so.
