= Luigi Castaldi =

Italian anatomist and physiologist (1890–1945)

Luigi Castaldi (14 February 1890 – 12 June 1945) was an Italian anatomist and physician. He demonstrated endocrine function in development and growth. He also wrote on the history of anatomy.

Castaldi was born in Pistoia to Vittorio and Vincenza Giovacchini Rosati. He studied medicine at the University of Florence. He specialised in human anatomy and studied human histology. In 1914, his studies were interrupted by war in which he saw action in the battles of Calvario, Lucina, Podgora, Gorizia, the first battles of the Isonzo and on the upper Val Dogna and Tramonti di Sotto. He received a medal in 1918 and returned to studies. His research on the liver of humans and other species was published as “Il connettivo nel fegato dei Vertebrati” (1920). He worked at the Institute of Human Anatomy of Florence under Giulio Chiarugi in 1919 and became a professor of human anatomy at the University of Perugia in 1923. In 1926, he became professor of anatomy at the University of Cagliari, where he remained during the Fascist regime. He transferred to the University of Genoa after Mussolini's defeat.

Cagliari conducted studies on endocrine functions and growth regulation. He used adrenal cortex extracts in food to examine effects. He used statistical techniques from Adolphe Quetelet and Francis Galton in anthropometry to measure growth curves. He confirmed Nello Beccari's theory of tegmental centres. He was a founding member of the Italian Society of Anatomy, over which he presided in 1923. Castaldi was involved in commissioning anatomical wax models for teaching.

Castaldi died in S. Maria Nuova hospital, Florence.
