= Leo Pardi =

- Born: 23 August 1915; San Giuliano Terme
- Died: 27 December 1990 (aged 75); Rignano sull'Arno
- Awards: Feltrinelli Prize (1976); Balzan Prize (1989)
- Scientific career
- Fields: Ethology

Leo Pardi (1915–1990) was an Italian zoologist and ethologist, the initiator of modern ethological research in Italy.

== Biography ==
Pardi graduated in Natural Sciences at the University of Pisa in 1938 and became there in 1943 a docent lecturing in zoology. He worked at the Zoological Institute of the University of Pisa until 1953, when he appointed to the University of Turin's chair of zoology. In 1962 he became the Director of the University of Florence's Zoological Institute, where he taught zoology until 1980 and then ethology until 1985. He retired from the University of Florence in 1987. From 1963 to 1972 he was the Director of the University of Florence's Zoological Museum. From 1971 to 1985 he was the Director of the Consiglio Nazionale delle Ricerche's Centro di Studio per la Faunistica ed Ecologia Tropicali.

In 1967 he created a new series of the journal Monitore Zoologica Italiano, which continued under his editorship until 1988.

Leo Pardi's son and firstborn child Francesco Pardi became a docent at the Faculty of Architecture at the Università degli Studi di Firenze and in 2008 a Senator of the Republic of Italy.

== Scientific work ==
Pardi was the first to scientifically describe dominance and rank order in wasps, based upon the species Polistes gallicus. He showed that, for fertile wasp females, shifting to a superior rank entailed further development of the ovaries, while shifting to an inferior rank entailed regression of the ovaries. He showed the trophic consequences of behavior and correctly hypothesized the involvement of the corpus allatum in dominance behavior.

About ten years after the first studies on the behavior of wasps, Pardi began a new line of research, that of orientation in littoral animals. Here too, he began with a brilliant discovery: the demonstration of a time-compensated sun-compass mechanism of orientation in the sandhopper Talitrus saltator. The discovery of Talitrus orientation led to the extension of research work to a large number of animals belonging to different groups and living in a variety of ecotones.

Pardi and his co-workers investigated several mechanisms of orientation in littoral animals and the innate and learned behavioral components of such orientation. Pardi also worked on insect histophysiology. He wrote a monograph on the fat body of insects and a paper on fertilized egg development in a tetraploid-parthenogentic strain of the moth Solenobia triquetrella.

== Honors and awards ==
Pardi was the President of the Unione Zoologica Italiana from 1961 to 1963. He was elected in 1972 a corresponding member and in 1982 a national member of Accademia Nazionale dei Lincei. Pardi received in 1976 the Antonio Feltrinelli Prize for the Biological Sciences and their applications and in 1989 the Balzan Prize for Ethology.

== See also ==
Ethology Ecology & Evolution
