= Paul Reuter (lawyer) =

French lawyer and academic (1911–1990)

- Born: 11 February 1911; Metz
- Died: 29 April 1990
- Awards: Balzan Prize
- Scientific career
- Fields: International Law
- Institutions: International Law Commission; University of Law, Economics and Social Science of Paris (Paris 2 Pantheon-Assas University); International Narcotics Control Board; Royal Academy of Belgium

Paul Reuter (Metz, 11 February 1911 – Paris, 28 April 1990) was a French lawyer considered the principal architect of the legal framework for the European Coal and Steel Community, the first in a series of institutions that would ultimately become the European Union. He was also an international arbitrator and member of several international organization. Reuter has been described as "one of the twentieth century's greatest specialists on international law".

== Biography ==
=== Early life ===
Paul Reuter was born on 12 February 1911 in Metz, which at that time was part of the German Empire, but reverted to France at the end of World War I. He served in the French Forces during World War II.

=== Academic career ===
Reuter obtained the title of Agrégé de droit in 1928, and in 1933 was awarded his Doctor of Laws at the University of Nancy. He began his long teaching career at the University of Nancy in the mid-1930s and was later on the university law faculties of Poitiers, Aix-en-Provence, Paris, and the Graduate Institute of International Studies in Geneva.

Oxford University Press's Encyclopaedic Dictionary of International Law (EDIL) lists Reuter's principal works as:

- Droit International public (5th ed. 1976),
- Institutions internationals (8th ed. 1965),
- Institutions et relations internationals (2nd ed. 1988),
- Introduction au droit des traités (3rd ed. 1990).

His book on the law of treaties (Introduction au droit des traités) is viewed as a "classic" work. This volume, and Reuter's book on international organizations (Institutions internationals) "are regarded as authoritative by academic and government circles alike." Further, Reuter's 1953 book on the European Coal and Steel Community (Communauté Européen du Charbon et de l'Acier) is the EDIL's recommended source on the institutions and structure of the European Community.

=== International career ===
==== Government Advisor, and role in the creation of the European Coal and Steel Community ====
After the war, Reuter held senior positions in the French Ministries of Information, Justice, and National Defence, and he was a long-time adviser to the French Ministry of Foreign Affairs. Reuter's input and expertise in international and public law was instrumental in the drafting of the Schuman Declaration and the Treaty of Paris (1951), which led to the creation of the European Coal and Steel Community (ECSC). The ECSC laid the foundation for the 1958 establishment of the European Economic Community, the forerunner of the European Union.

==== Judicial career ====
Reuter was a member of the International Law Commission of the United Nations from 1964 to 1989.

He represented France before the Court of Justice of the European Communities and the European Court of Human Rights.

As "one of the great international law minds of the world", Reuter was much in demand in international adjudications and arbitrations.

==== International Drug Control bodies ====
Reuter was a member of several international drug control conventions-related bodies.

Notably, Reuter was a founding member of the International Narcotics Control Board. In 1990, the Board declared:

Professor Reuter served with great distinction as a member of the International Narcotics Control Board and its predecessor bodies for forty-two years and as the Board's President from 1974 until 1982. He brought to the international Board not only his expertise on international law, but also his skills as a consummate diplomat, a man of vision with a profound knowledge of the international drug control treaties and their legislative histories. He guided the Board wisely and pointed the way to solving the most complex and difficult issues. His intellectual courage was legendary, as was his immense talent for reconciling conflicting views.

=== Honours and awards ===
In 1981, Reuter was awarded the Balzan Prize for his work in International Public Law. The Balzan Prize is "one of the most prestigious international awards in natural science and humanities" and, in 2020, was worth 750,000 Swiss francs (about US$800,000).

During 1985 and 1986, Reuter was President of the Nobel Peace Prize-winning Institute of International Law (Institut de Droit International).

In 1986 Reuter received the World Academy of Art & Science Rufus Jones Award for Contributions to World Peace and International Understanding.

=== Death and legacy ===
Paul Reuter died on 29 April 1990 at the age of 79.

The construction of Europe owes much to Professor Reuter, according to Honorary President of the French Society for International Law, Alain Pellet. He believes "It was not exaggeration to say that, without him, the European Communities would not have appeared in their present form, or would have been established only much later."

Also, Reuter's contribution to the modern law of treaties and the law of international organizations will leave "indelible imprints on legal history" according to Bola Ajibola, speaking on behalf of the African country members of the UN's International Law Commission. Ajibola noted Reuter aspired to make international law "free from injustice and intended to serve the interest of both developed and developing counties, while protecting the weak from the strong."

A donation by Reuter in 1981 enabled the International Committee of the Red Cross (ICRC) to establish the Paul Reuter Prize to encourage research in, and the promotion of, international humanitarian law.

== See also ==
- European Coal and Steel Community
- Schuman Declaration
- International Committee of the Red Cross
- Balzan Prize
- Drug policy, Drug prohibition
