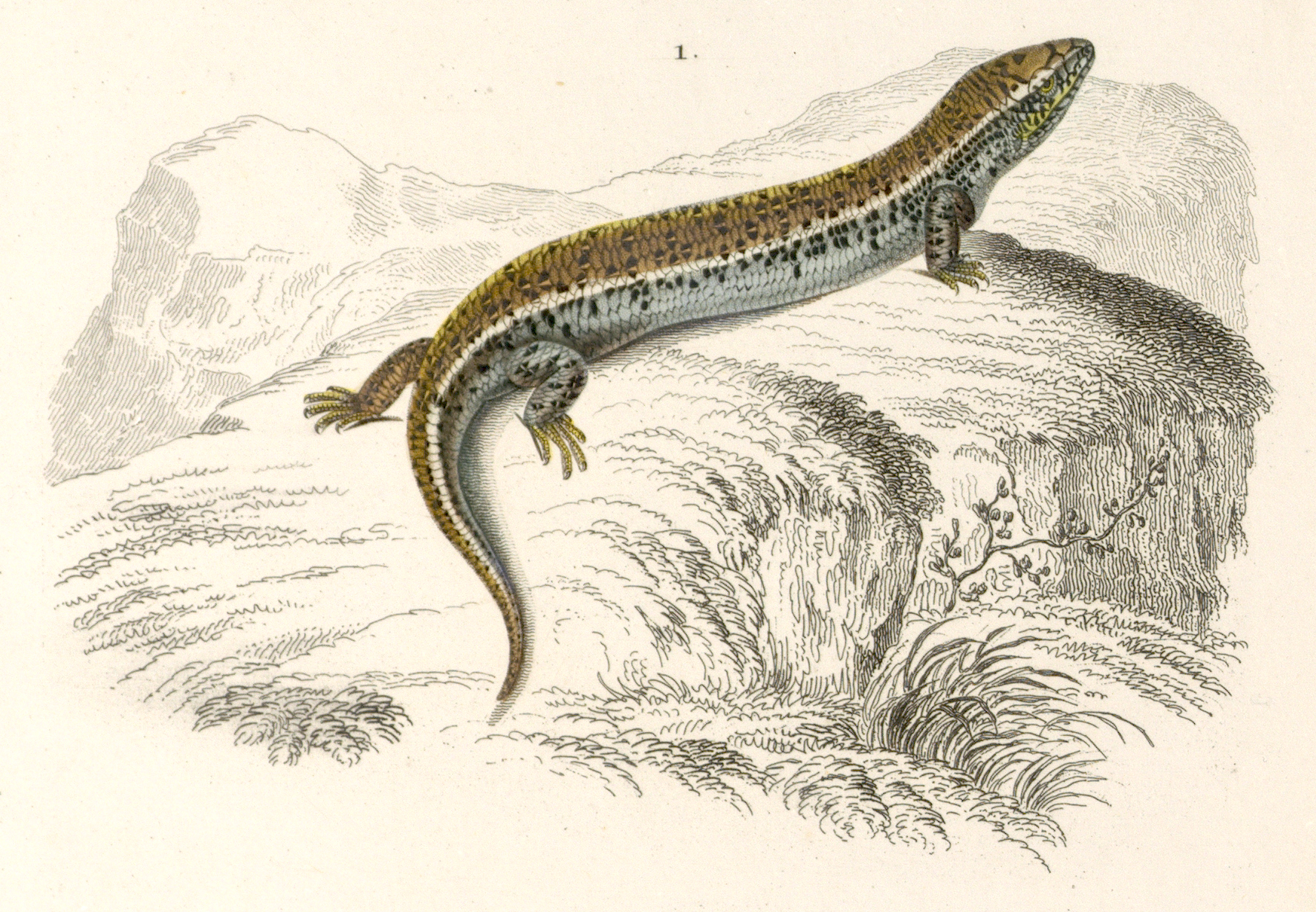

Conservation status
- Least Concern (IUCN 3.1)

Scientific classification
- Kingdom: Animalia
- Phylum: Chordata
- Class: Reptilia
- Order: Squamata
- Family: Scincidae
- Genus: Chalcides
- Species: C. ocellatus

Binomial name
- Chalcides ocellatus (Forsskål, 1775)

= Chalcides ocellatus =

Species of lizard

Chalcides ocellatus, or the ocellated skink (also known as the eyed skink or gongilo) is a species of skink found in Greece, southern Italy, Malta, Lebanon, UAE, Israel, Palestine, and parts of northern Africa. It is also found in Pakistan, India and Sri Lanka.

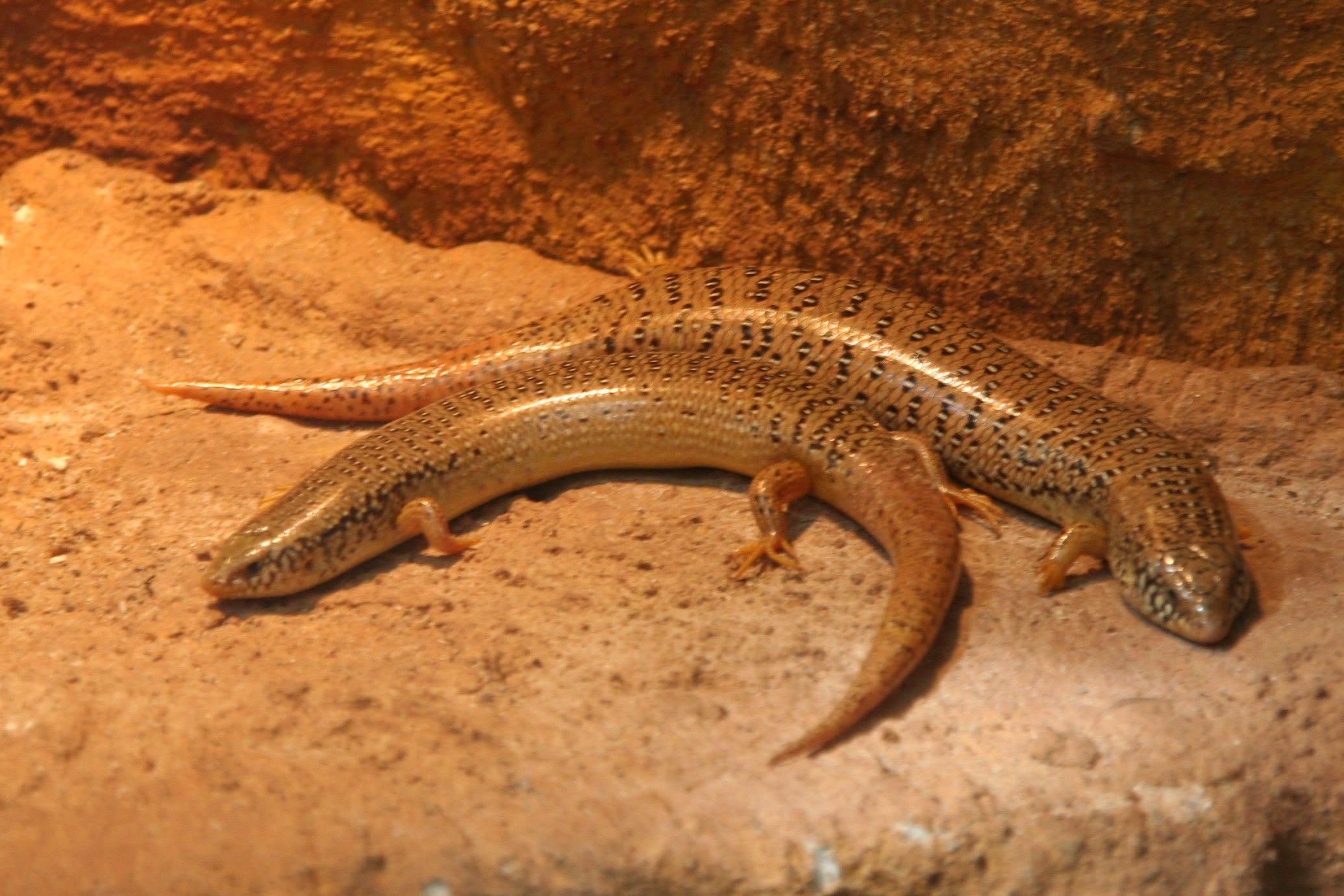
Chalcides ocellatus

== Description ==
As an adult, it generally reaches about 15 to 30 cm (6 to 12 in) of length with a 22 to 39 g weight and has a small head, cylindrical body, and five toes on each foot. They are very agile and are often found in arid areas. It is strongly related to Chalcides colosii, and C. colosii was formerly considered a subspecies of C. ocellatus. C. ocellatus is notable for the presence of ocelli and for its wide variety of coloration patterns. Females of the species give birth to 2-6 live young through viviparity.

Chalcides ocellatus is considered to be a generalist species and can be found in a wide variety of environments, such as farmland and gravel deserts around the Mediterranean coast. Its main escape tactic from predators is to run behind vegetation, most likely because it is not suited to run very fast. Although this species has very smooth scales and is capable of "sand-swimming" behavior in loose sand or soil, its limbs are not specifically adapted for fossorial movement.

== Diet ==
Ocellated skinks are primarily insectivorous. In the wild they have been recorded to eat a wide variety of insects, including locusts, crickets, ants, beetles, isopods, spiders, centipedes, and insect larvae. However, they are also known to occasionally eat small lizards, including their own young, and the tails of young lizards are a regular finding in the stomach contents of Chalcides ocellatus.

In captivity, ocellated skinks can be primarily fed on insect prey, but they also take certain commercial diets as well as occasional wet cat/dog food. Ocellated skinks are also known to eat small amounts of plant matter, such as finely chopped greens, flowers, and fruits.
