= Marilyn Kelly-Buccellati =

American archaeologist

- Born: 1939 (age 86–87); Morristown, New Jersey
- Occupation: American archaeologist
- Spouse: Giorgio Buccellati

Marilyn Kelly-Buccellati is an American archaeologist who focused her research on the Caucasus and ancient Syria in the third and second millennium B.C. (and specifically on the ancient Urkesh, the modern Tell Mozan, as well as the Kura-Araxes culture in the South Caucasus).

== Early life and education ==
Buccellati was born in Morristown, New Jersey in 1939. She received her Ph.D. in 1974 from the Oriental Institute at the University of Chicago, where she studied Oriental Languages and civilizations.

== Career ==
Buccellati taught in the Department of Art at California State University from 1973 until 2003, when she became professor emerita of archaeology and art history. That same year, she moved to the Cotsen Institute of Archaeology at the University of California, Los Angeles (UCLA), where she continued her research.

Bucecellati's fieldwork began in 1966, when she spent time in Syria, doing a survey near Palmyra. From there, she spent time in Iraq excavating at Nippur. In addition, she spent time in Caucasus, in Korucutepe in Turkey, Terqa in Syria where she was co-director from 1976 to 1988.

In 1982, she and her husband Giorgio, taking a day away from their work at the Terqa excavation site in Syria, drove north to Tell Mozan, where they discovered evidence of the ancient Hurrian city of Urkesh. From 1983 to 2020, she served as director of the archaeological expedition.

Buccellati directed the 1971 Dilbat Archaeological Survey, which mapped ancient settlement patterns and hydrological networks. She has been a member of the Italian-Georgian excavations at Aradetis Orgora from 2013 to 2017 and at Lagodekhi from 2018.

Her focus has been on stratigraphy, architecture and ancient ceramics connected with sites where she has excavated. She was able to identify the use of a large ancient underground shaft excavated in Tell Mozan/Urkesh as a Hurrian ritual shaft for rituals used in communicating with the Underworld. She has written a number of publications on ancient cylinder seals and seal impression iconography

Her work on style has led her to establish criteria for the identification of what may be called Hurrian art; it has further helped define major trends in Syro-Mesopotamian art, such as the development of a new attention for realism in the rendering of the human figure. She has also worked extensively on statistical analysis, in particular with regard to ceramic typology: she is currently producing a digital book on the very extensive ceramic corpus of Urkesh.

Combining her interest in stratigraphy and iconography she worked on the many thousands of fragmented seal impressions found in the Mozan excavations so that she could determine the iconographic motifs they contained which embodied a new Hurrian style. By connecting scenes and inscriptions on these seal impressions it was possible to identify Tell Mozan as the site of ancient Urkesh, and to describe the original seals as belonging to several kings, queens, and servants of the royal court. Urkesh is one of the oldest and largest cities of Syria, dating back to the early fourth millennium and reaching an extent of some 130 hectares in the third millennium. It was a major center of the Hurrians, important politically but especially for its religious significance. The reconstruction of the Urkesh iconography led to her research on the position and power of the royal Urkesh women and the women connected with them.

She is retired from the Art Department of California State University Los Angeles where she taught ancient art and archaeology for 30 years. Presently she is an Associated Researcher of the Cotsen Institute of Archaeology at University of California, UCLA.

== Personal life ==
Buccellati is married to Italian archeologist Giorgio Buccellati.

== Grants and awards (reverse chronological order) ==
- 2021 Balzan Prize for Art and Archaeology of the Ancient Near East together with Giorgio Buccellati.
- 2020 Europa Nostra ILUCIDARE prize
- 2019 Between Syria and the Highlands. Studies in Honor of Giorgio Buccellati and Marilyn Kelly Buccellati
- 2017 Research Medal from the Shanghai Archaeological Forum
- 2013 Ahmanson Field Grants, Cotsen Institute of Archaeology, UCLA
- 1999 Sabbatical, California State University, Los Angeles
- 1997 (Spring) Creative Leave, California State University, Los Angeles
- 1994–95 Sabbatical, California State University, Los Angeles
- 1976–2020 Excavation grants from the National Endowment for the Humanities, The Ambassador International Cultural Foundation, Catholic Biblical Association, Kress Foundation, Ahmanson Foundation, Skaggs Foundation, National Geographic Society, San Carlos Foundation.
- 1987–94 Principal Investigator, National Endowment for the Humanities Division of Research (RO-21543-87) for The Mozan Archaeological Project.
- 1987–88 Panelist for NEH to select grantees for Old World Archaeology.

== Main publications (selection in reverse chronological order) ==
- Kelly-Buccellati, Marilyn; Buccellati, Federico; Kelly-Buccellati, Giorgio (April 2025). "Archaeological Conservation between Excavation and Fruition: The Case of Tell Mozan, Ancient Urkesh". In Terra 2022: Proceedings of the 13th World Congress on Earthen Architectural Heritage, Sante Fe, New Mexico, USA, June 7-10, 2022. Getty Publications. p. 126.
- 2020: “Continuity and Innovation at Urkesh in the ED III Period,” in M.E. Balza, P. Cotticelli-Kurras, L. d’Alfonso, M. Giorgieri, F. Giusfredi and A. Rizza (eds), Città e parole, argilla e pietra. Studi offerti a Clelia Mora da allievi, colleghi e amici, Biblioteca di Athenaeum 65, Bari: EDIPUGLIA, pp. 295–310.
- 2020: “Sifting or Not: Research on the Effectiveness of Sifting,” in Nadja Cholidis, Elisabeth Katzy and Sabina Kulemann-Ossen (eds), Zwischen Ausgrabung und Ausstellung, Beiträge zur Archäologie Vorderasiens. Festschrift für Lutz Martin, marru: Studien zur Vorderasiatischen Archäologie 9, Münster: Zaphon, pp. 259–266.
- 2020: “Archaeological Digital Narratives: The Case of Urkesh Ceramics,” in Alexander Ahrens, Dörte Rokitta-Krumnow, Franziska Bloch and Claudia Bührig (eds), Drawing the Threads Together, Studies on Archaeology in Honour of Karin Bartl, marru: Studien zur Vorderasiatischen Archäologie 10, Münster: Zaphon, pp. 379–398 (with Giorgio Buccellati).
- 2020: “The Urkesh Mittani Horizon: Ceramic Evidence,” in Michele Cammarosano et al. (eds), talugaesh wittesh. Ancient Near Eastern Studies presented to Stefano de Martino, Kasion. Publikationen zur ostmediterranen Antike/Publications on Eastern Mediterranean Antiquity 2, Münster: Zaphon, pp. 237–256.
- 2019: “Images of Work in Urkesh,” in Marta D’Andrea, Maria Gabriella Micale, Davide Nadali, Sara Pizzimenti and Agnese Vacca (eds), Pearls of the Past. Studies on Near Eastern Art and Archaeology in Honour of Frances Pinnock, marru, Studies in Near and Middle Eastern Archaeology 8, Münster: Zaphon, pp. 413–428
- 2019: “Urkesh Ceramic Evidence for Function,” in A. Pieńkowska, D. Szeląg and I. Zych (eds), Stories told around the fountain. Papers offered to Piotr Bieliński on the occasion of his 70th birthday, Warsaw: University of Warsaw Press; PCMA UW., pp. 285–304.
- 2019: “Emulation as a Strategy of Urkesh Potters and its Long Term Consequences,” Sh. N. Amirov (ed.), Caucasian Mountains and Mesopotamian Steppe. Festschrift for R. M. Munchaev, Moscow: ИАРАН, pp. 355–61.
- 2018: “Urkesh Insights into Kura-Araxes Social Interaction” in Atilla Batmaz, Giorgi Bedianashvili, Aleksandra Michalewicz and Abby Robinson (eds), Context and Connection: Essays on the Archaeology of the Ancient Near East in Honour of Antonio Sagona, Orientalia Lovanensia Analecta 268, Leuven, Paris, Bristol (CT): Peeters, pp. 107–123.
- 2016: Georgia Paese d’oro e di fede. Identità e alterità nella storia di un popolo, Firenze: Società editrice fiorentina, 128 pp.
- 2016: “Urkesh: The Morphology and Cultural Landscape of the Hurrian Sacred,” in Paolo Matthiae (ed.), L’Archeologia del sacro e l’archeologia del culto, Accademia Nazionale dei Lincei: Atti dei convegni Lincei 304, Roma: Bardi Edizioni, pp. 99–113.
- 2016: “Women's Power and Work in Ancient Urkesh” in S.L. Budin and J.M. Turfa (eds), Women in Antiquity: Real Women across the Ancient World, London, New York: Routledge, pp. 48–63.
- 2016: “The Urkesh Ceramics Digital Book,” in Paola Corò et al. (eds), Libiamo ne’ lieti calici. Ancient Near Eastern Studies Presented to Lucio Milano on the Occasion of his 65th Birthday by Pupils, Colleagues and Friends, Münster: Ugarit-Verlag, pp. 721–734.
- 2015: “Power and Identity Construction in Ancient Urkesh,” in Paola Ciafardoni and Deborah Giannessi (eds), From the Treasures of Syria. Essays on Art and Archaeology in Honour of Stefania Mazzoni, Leiden: Nederlands Inst. voor het Nabije Oosten, pp. 111–130.
- 2013: “Landscape and Spatial Organization: An Essay on Early Urban Settlement Patterns in Urkesh,” in Dominik Bonatz and Lutz Martin (eds), 100 Jahre archäologische Feldforschungen in Nordost-Syrien – Eine Bilanz, Wiesbaden: Harrassowitz, pp. 149–166.
- 2012: “Apprenticeship and Learning from the Ancestors: The Case of Ancient Urkesh,” in Willeke Wendrich (ed.), Archaeology and Apprenticeship: Body Knowledge, Identity, and Communities of Practice, Tucson: University of Arizona Press, pp. 203–223.
- 2010: “Mozan/Urkesh in the Late Chalcolithic Period,” in Jörg Becker, Ralph Hempelmann, and Ellen Rehm (eds), Kulturlandschaft Syrien: Zentrum und Peripherie. Festschrift für Jan-Waalke Meyer, Alter Orient und Alten Testament 371, Münster: Ugarit-Verlag, pp. 87–121.
- 2009: “Uqnitum and Tar’am-Agade, Patronage and Portraiture at Urkesh,” in J.C. Finke (ed.), Festschrift für Gernot Wilhelm anläßlich seines 65. Geburtstagesam 28. Januar 2010, Dresden: ISLET, pp. 185–202.
- 2006: “Gilgamesh at Urkesh? Literary Motifs and Iconographic Identifications,” in P. Butterlin, M. Lebeau, J.-Y. Montchambert, J. L. Mntero Fenollós and B. Muller (eds), Les Espaces Syro-Mésopotamiens. Dimensions de l’experience humaine au Proche-Orient ancient. Volume d’hommage offert à Jean-Claude Margueron, Subartu 17, Turnhout: Brepols, pp. 403–414.
- 2005: “Urkesh and the North: Recent Discoveries,” Studies on the Civilization and Culture of Nuzi and the Hurrians 15, Winona Lake, Ind.: Eisenbrauns, pp. 29–40.
- 2004: “Andirons at Urkesh: New Evidence for the Hurrian Identity of Early Transcaucasian Culture,” in A. Sagona (ed.), A View from the Highlands: Archaeological Studies in Honour of Charles Burney, ANES Supplement 2, Herent: Peeters, pp. 67–89.
- 2003: “Ein hurritischer Gang in die Unterwelt,” Mitteilungen der Deutschen Orient-Gesellschaft 134, pp. 131–148.
- 2002: “Tar’am-Agade, Daughter of Naram-Sin, at Urkesh,” in L. Al-Gailani, J. Curtis, H. Martin, A. McMahon, J. Oates and J. Reade (eds), Of Pots and Plans. Papers on the Archaeology and History of Mesopotamia and Syria presented to David Oates in Honour of his 75th Birthday, London: Nabu Publications, pp. 11–31 (with Giorgio Buccellati).
