= Chalcides colosii =

Riffian skink

Conservation status
- Least Concern (IUCN 3.1)

Scientific classification
- Kingdom: Animalia
- Phylum: Chordata
- Class: Reptilia
- Order: Squamata
- Family: Scincidae
- Genus: Chalcides
- Species: C. colosii

Binomial name
- Chalcides colosii Lanza, 1957
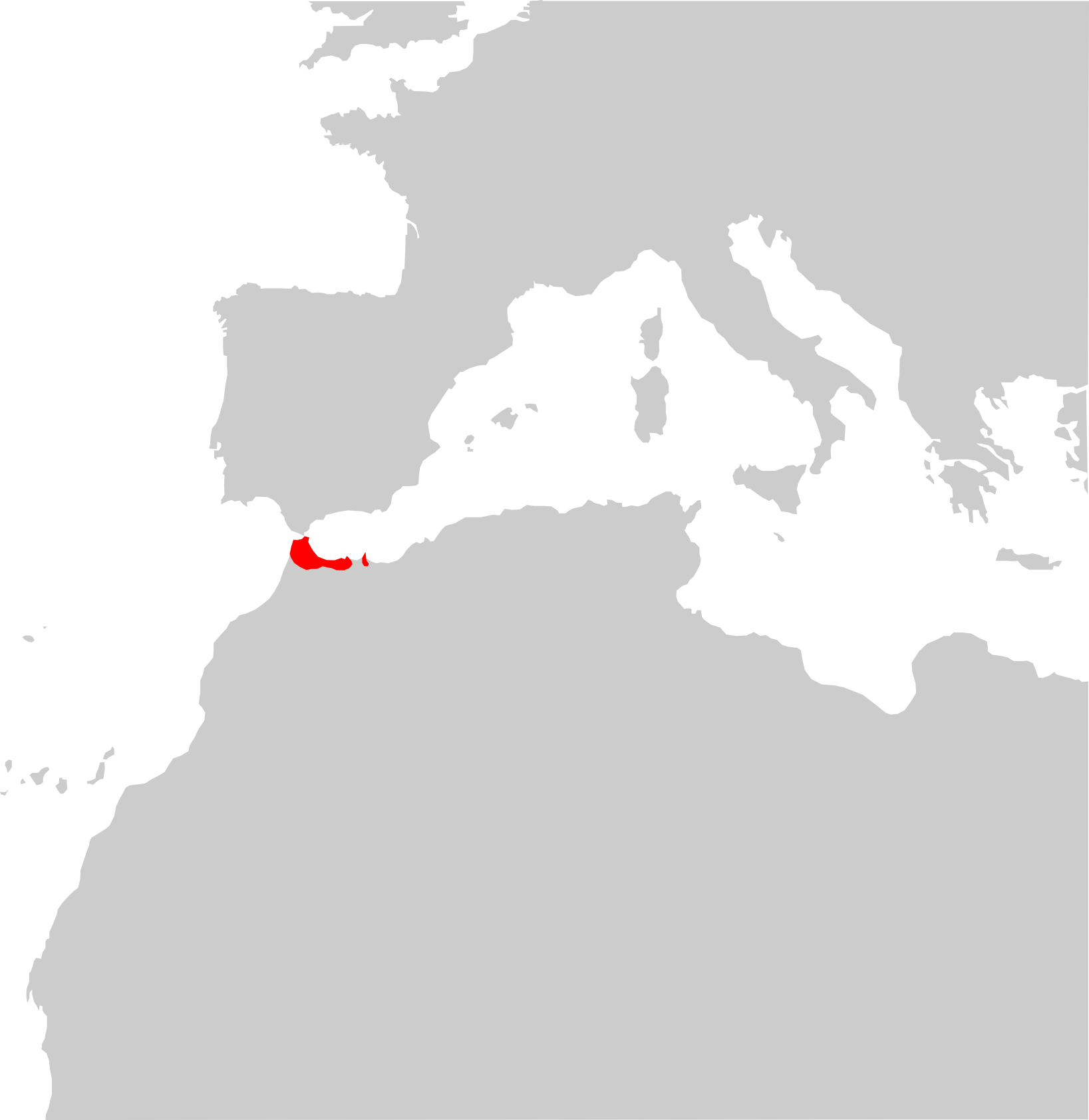

Synonyms
- Chalcides ocellatus Var. vittatus Boulenger, 1890; Chalcides ocellatus vittatus — Mertens, 1921; Chalcides colosii Lanza, 1957 (nomen novum); Chalcides ocellatus colosii — Bons, 1972; Chalcides colosii — Pasteur, 1981

Species of lizard

Chalcides colosii, also known commonly as the Riffian skink and Colosi's cylindrical skink, is a moderate-sized species of lizard in the family Scincidae. The species is native to Morocco and some Spanish territories in northwestern Africa. It is named after Giuseppe Colosi, former director of the Zoological Institute of the University of Florence. It has been considered a subspecies of Chalcides ocellatus. The females of the species give birth to live young.

== Conservation status ==
The population of C. colosii is most likely slowly declining, but it is not under any major threat. The IUCN gives it least concern status because, although its range is less than 20,000 km^{2} (7,700 mi^{2}), its habitat is extensive and is not severely threatened. Also, it is presumed to have a large population. Some possible threats to C. colosii include tourism and agricultural development.

== Geographic range and habitat ==
C. colosii is found in Morocco, the Spanish exclaves Ceuta and Melilla, and the Spanish island Isla de Tierra (near Peñón de Alhucemas), but is not very common in the western part of this range. Its general abundance is not well known, but it lives in semi-arid or sub-humid areas up to an altitude of 1,500 m (4,900 ft). It is most commonly found in rocky areas such as stone heaps or slopes with loose soil and partial grass cover. It can also be found near coastal sand dunes and grassland.

== Coloration and distinguishing features ==
Although similar to the ocellated skink, C. ocellatus, C. colosii can be distinguished by its lack of ocelli and its dark lateral bands. C. colosii has a moderately dark lateral band in the center of its back bordered on either side with two darker bands. The remainder has a solid light color. Its adult size is generally between 6 and 12 cm (2.4 and 4.7 in) snout-to-vent length (SVL).

== Reproduction ==
C. colosii is viviparous.
