= Giorgio Buccellati =

Italian archaeologist

Giorgio Buccellati is an Italian archaeologist, best known for having discovered the ancient city of Urkesh (modern Tell Mozan), capital of the Hurrians, in Syria.

== Current position ==
Buccellati is a Professor Emeritus in the Department of Near Eastern Languages and Cultures and the Department of History at UCLA. He was the founding director of the Cotsen Institute of Archaeology. He founded IIMAS – The International Institute for Mesopotamian Area Studies, of which he is currently the Director. He has also been active as a publisher, having founded Undena Publications, of which he is currently the General Editor.

== Interests ==
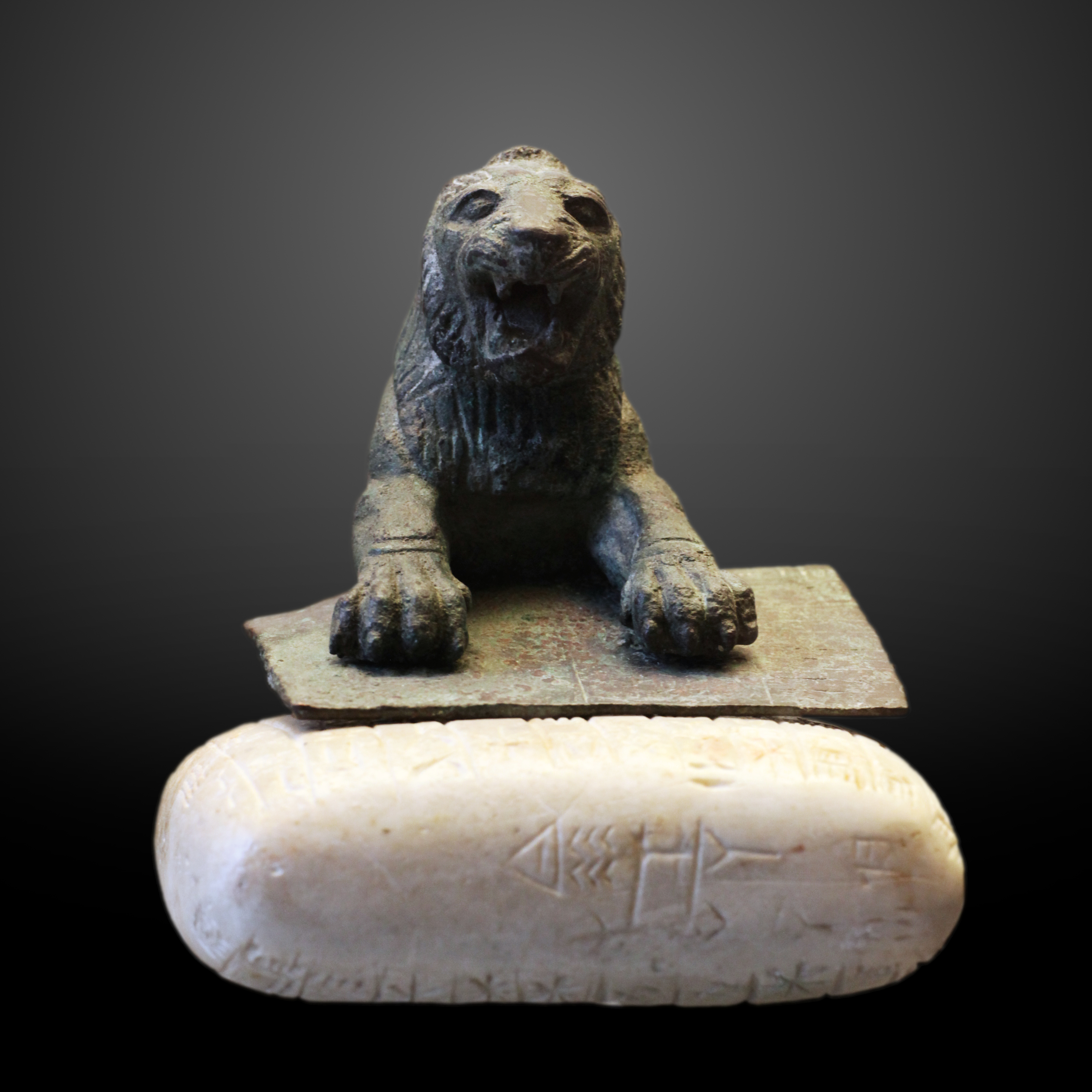
The "lion of the Louvre" which, with the similar bronze of the Metropolitan Museum of Art (New York) led Buccellati to rediscover Urkesh.

Buccellati has published extensively in the fields of Akkadian philology, linguistics and literature; cuneiform graphemics; history of Mesopotamian political institutions and religion; archaeology of Syria; digital systems applied to Mesopotamia. He has participated and directed archaeological projects in Iraq, Turkey, the Caucasus and especially Syria (Terqa, Urkesh).

== Biography ==
Buccellati is a scholar of ancient Syro-Mesopotamia, engaged in research in the fields of language, history and archaeology, he is particularly conscious of the need of introducing perspectives and views that help us to better understand an ancient world which, despite far in time, is yet fundamental for our modern sensitivity. Thus, for instance, his A Structural Grammar of Babylonian highlighted some details of this language seen not as "dead" but as alive in its organic structure still fully accessible in all its nuances. He was the first to introduce the use of computers in the field of archaeology in Syria, and he is at the forefront of using digital methods that are transforming our way of deeply understanding the world of ancient material culture. His historical research led him to review the keys of interpretation and understanding of both the institutional and spiritual development of the ancient Mesopotamians, in particular the origins of politics and the growth of the State, impact of ethnic factors in the structuring of new groups like the tribe, the possibility of accessing the perceptive world through research mechanisms based on the canons of objectivity.

Buccellati is a full professor in the two departments of languages and history at the University of California at Los Angeles (UCLA), he founded the Institute of Archaeology in 1973 (Cotsen Institute of Archaeology), which he supervised as the first director until 1983. Currently "Emeritus", he continues teaching and is "Research Professor" and director of the Mesopotamian archaeology laboratory at the same institute. He is co-director of the research project "Philosophical Dimensions of the Hermeneutics of Archeology" within the Department of Philosophy of the "Università Cattolica del Sacro Cuore", Milan. In 1973 he founded IIMAS – "The International Institute for Mesopotamian Area Studies", and in 2010 his Italian counterpart, the "Istituto Internazionale per la Mesopotamia e l’Alta Siria", of which he is still the director.

Author of a dozen volumes and more than one hundred scientific papers, "Guggenheim Fellow" for his ethnographic and geographical research in Syria, he is currently involved in the creation of a large website (URG – “Urkesh Global Record”) which develops in a completely innovative way a fully digital approach to archaeological data, through a humanistic and scientific perspective.

With his wife Marilyn Kelly-Buccellati, Professor Emerita of California State University, Los Angeles, he has conducted archaeological excavations and surveys in Iraq, Turkey, the Caucasus and especially in Syria. It is here where, for twenty-five years, they have jointly directed the excavations of the ancient city of Urkesh/Tell Mozan, where they have involved a large international team. They also work together in publishing excavation reports and interpreting archaeological data and have given countless scientific lectures in the world's major archaeological institutions.

In 2021, he was awarded the Balzan Prize for Art and Archaeology of the Ancient Near East together with his wife Marilyn Kelly-Buccellati.

== Curriculum Studiorum ==
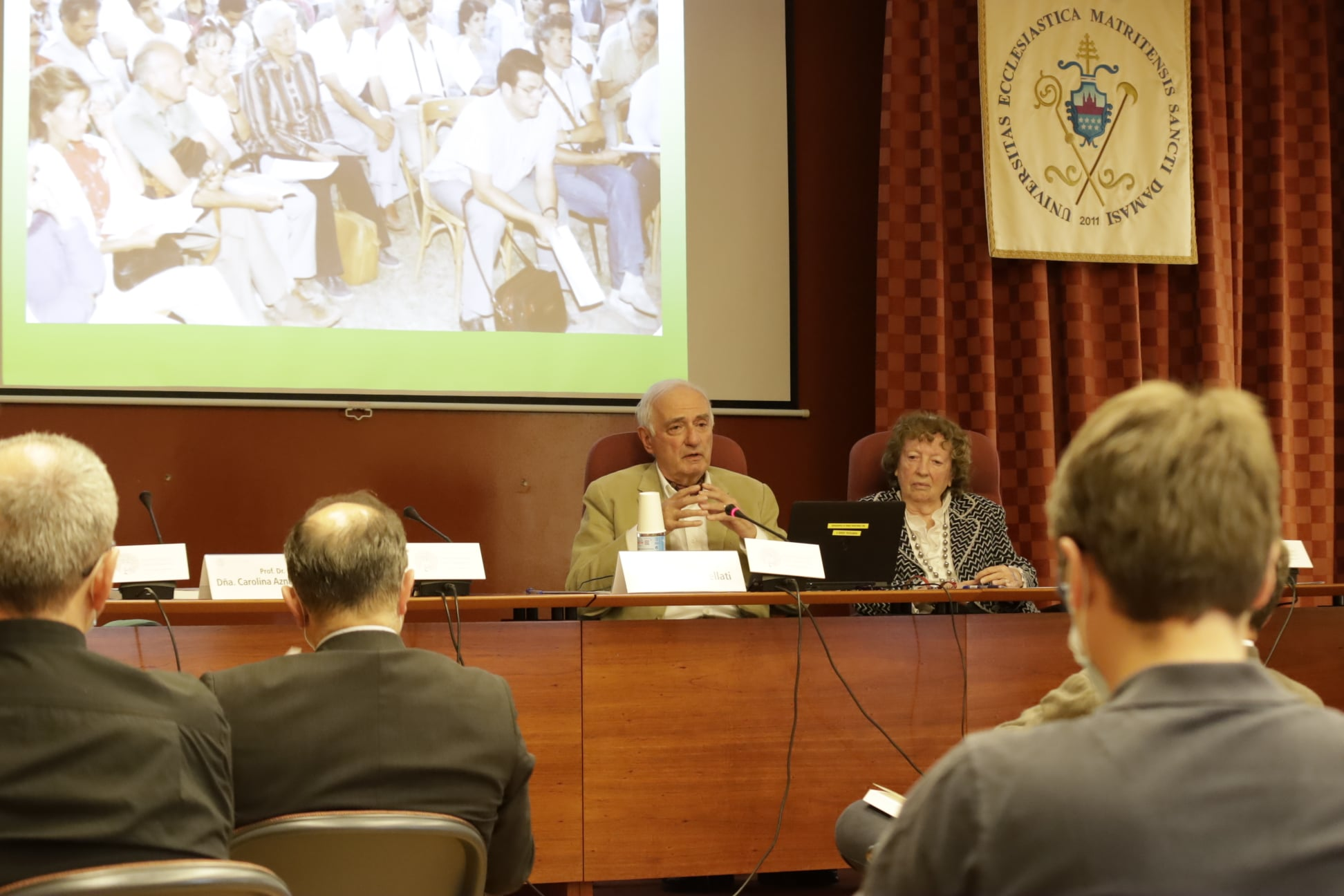
Giorgio Buccellati gives a conference at the San Dámaso University, in Madrid (Spain)

After completing his classical studies at the Gonzaga Institute in Milan, he graduated in ancient history at the Università Cattolica del Sacro Cuore", Milan in 1959; he then completed his studies in philosophy at Fordham University in New York in 1961 and oriental civilizations at the University of Chicago in 1965. He then taught at the University of California at Los Angeles (UCLA), where, in 1973, he founded the Cotsen Institute of Archeology directing it for the next ten years and where, since 1994, he has been professor emeritus in the two departments of languages and history. In 1973 he also founded the IIMAS (The International Institute for Mesopotamian Area Studies). Also active in the publishing field, he established Undena Publications whose he is the general director.

== Academic degrees ==
- University of Chicago, 1960-1965 (Ph.D., Oriental Languages)
- Fordham University, New York, 1959-1960 (M.A., Philosophy)
- University of Innsbruck, Austria, 1958-1959 (Coursework in Philosophy)
- University of Bonn, Germany, summer 1956 (German certification)
- Università Cattolica del Sacro Cuore, Milan, Italy, 1954-1958 (Degree in Classics)

== Investigations and fields of research ==
His in-depth research and related publications concern the Akkadian world (philology, linguistics, and literature), cuneiform graphematics, the history of the political and religious institutions of Mesopotamia and the archaeology of Syria. With his wife Marilyn Kelly-Buccellati he has participated in and directed archaeological projects in Iraq (in Nippur and Dilbat), in Turkey (at Korucutepe), in the Caucasus and especially in Syria (in Terqa and Urkesh/Tell Mozan). Besides having created important scientific websites, since 1968 he has applied digital systems to archaeological and linguistic research.

== Main publications ==
- (EN) The Amorites of the Ur III period, Naples, Istituto Orientale, 1966 Volume 1; Volume 2.
- (EN) Cities and nations of ancient Syria. An essay on political institutions with special reference to the Israelite Kingdoms, Rome, Istituto di Studi del Vicino Oriente, 1967.
- (EN) Cuneiform texts from Nippur. The eighth and ninth seasons (with Robert D. Biggs), Chicago, The University of Chicago Press, 1969.
- (EN) Terqa Excavation Reports - The fourth season: introduction and the stratigraphic record, Malibu, Undena Publications, 1979. ISBN 0-89003-042-1.
- (EN) Terqa 1978 - The joint expedition to Terqa: the fourth season, fall 1978 (ed., together with Marilyn Kelly-Buccellati), Malibu, Undena Publications, 1979. ISBN 0-89003-076-6.
- (EN) Mozan Excavation Reports - The soundings of the first two seasons (with Marilyn Kelly-Buccellati), Malibu, Undena Publications, 1988. ISBN 0-89003-195-9.
- (EN) A Structural Grammar of Babylonian, Wiesbaden, Harrassowitz, 1996. ISBN 3-447-03612-5.
- (ITA) "Quando in alto i cieli". La spiritualità mesopotamica a confronto con quella biblica, Milano, Jaca Book, 2012. ISBN 978-88-16-41159-3.
- (ITA) Alle origini della politica. La formazione e la crescita dello Stato in Siro-Mesopotamia (Preface by Marta Cartabia), Milano, Jaca Book, 2013 (website). ISBN 978-88-16-41214-9.
