= Rasmus Nielsen (biologist) =

Danish geneticist

- Born: January 27, 1970 (age 56); Denmark
- Education: University of Copenhagen (Cand.scient., 1994); University of California, Berkeley (Ph.D., 1998)
- Known for: Evolutionary genetics Population genetics
- Awards: Sloan Foundation Research Fellowship (2004)
- Scientific career
- Fields: Evolutionary biology Statistical genetics
- Workplaces: Cornell University; University of California, Berkeley
- Thesis: Monte Carlo likelihood methods in population genetics (1998)
- Doctoral advisor: Montgomery Slatkin

Rasmus Nielsen (born January 27, 1970) is a Danish biologist and professor in the Department of Integrative Biology at the University of California, Berkeley. His research focuses on statistical genetics and computational genomics as they relate to evolutionary biology. Nielsen is well known for the multitude of methods he has developed, including significant contributions to maximum likelihood approaches for population genetics. Much of his research has focused on the molecular mechanisms of evolutionary adaptations. For example, in 2010, his research group discovered the variant in the EPAS1 gene that allows Tibetans to live at high altitudes. His research has also identified an evolved genetic adaptation among the Inuit that allows them to metabolize fatty acids.

In 2026 he was awarded the Balzan Prize for Molecular Evolution: Decoding Patterns of Genomic Change.
