= Josiah Ober =

American historian of ancient Greece (born 1953)

Josiah Ober is an American historian of ancient Greece and classical political theorist. He is Tsakopoulos-Kounalakis Professor in honor of Constantine Mitsotakis, and professor of classics and political science, at Stanford University, and Senior Fellow at the Hoover Institution. His teaching and research link ancient Greek history and philosophy with modern political theory and practice on democracy.

== Career ==
Ober was educated at the University of Minnesota (B.A., major in history, 1975) and the University of Michigan (Ph.D., Department of History, 1980).

He was a professor of ancient history at Montana State University (1980–1990), and then at Princeton University (1990–2006).

He has received fellowships from the National Humanities Center (1983–84), American Council of Learned Societies (1989–90), the National Endowment for the Humanities (1997), and the Center for Advanced Study in the Behavioral Science (2004–5), among others. He was awarded the prestigious Barry Prize for Distinguished Intellectual Achievement by the American Academy of Sciences and Letters in 2023.

In 2025 he was awarded the Balzan Prize for his groundbreaking research on the origins and functioning of Athenian democracy in classical times.

He delivered the 2002-2003 Sigmund H. Danziger, Jr. Memorial Lecture in the Humanities at the University of Chicago and the 2019 Sather Lectures at University of California, Berkeley.

Ober was a student of Chester Starr, and has taught classicist John Ma, ancient Greek historian Emily Mackil, and the political theorist Ryan Balot.

== Influence ==
Ober's Mass and Elite in Democratic Athens won the Goodwin Award in 1989. Paul Cartledge called Mass and Elite in Democratic Athens “a seminal work”. Some early work was criticized by Mogens Herman Hansen for overemphasizing the ideological aspect of Athenian democracy against its institutional dimension, and P.J. Rhodes accused him of abandoning scholarly impartiality in favour of democratic advocacy.

Jennifer Roberts called Political Dissent in Democratic Athens “a major contribution to a dialogue of enormous import”.

Danielle Allen praised Ober's Democracy and Knowledge in The New Republic (2008). Melissa Lane wrote: "Ober draws on empirical evidence about the ancient world in the service of normative political theory, and in so doing sheds light not just on Athens but on the creation and operation of democratic institutions."

Mimis Chrysomalis's review of The Rise and Fall of Classical Greece CritCom states that in this “significant resource for scholars of classical antiquity, political science, and economic history” Ober “offers a novel perspective on how economic performance was connected to . . . democratic institutions.” Adriaan Lanni's review praised Rise and Fall as part of the “exciting (and controversial) recent developments” in the 'Stanford school of ancient history' and judged Ober's arguments an “unusually compelling compilation of methods, data and argument in support of a broad thesis.” By contrast, in a review of The Rise and Fall of Classical Greece for New Left Review, Peter Rose concluded that Ober had produced “an eccentric, at times intriguing, but deeply flawed work of history, which ultimately tells us more about the ideology of the Stanford classics department than it does about ancient Greece”.

Barton Swaim called Demopolis: Democracy Before Liberalism a “tightly reasoned work of scholarship” in his Wall Street Journal review.

== Books ==
=== Authored ===
- Fortress Attica: Defense of the Athenian Land Frontier, 404-322 B.C., Leiden: E.J. Brill, 1985.
- Mass and Elite in Democratic Athens: Rhetoric, Ideology, and the Power of the People, Princeton: Princeton University Press, 1989.
- The Athenian Revolution: Essays on Ancient Greek Democracy and Political Theory, Princeton: Princeton University Press, 1996.
- Political Dissent in Democratic Athens: Intellectual Critics of Popular Rule, Princeton: Princeton University Press, 1998.
- Athenian Legacies: Essays on the Politics of Going on Together, Princeton: Princeton University Press, 2005.
- Democracy and Knowledge: Innovation and Learning in Classical Athens, Princeton: Princeton University Press, 2008.
- The Rise and Fall of Classical Greece, Princeton: Princeton University Press, 2015.
- Demopolis: Democracy Before Liberalism in Theory and Practice, Cambridge: Cambridge University Press, 2017.

=== Co-authored ===
- with Manville, Brook, A Company of Citizens: What the World's First Democracy Teaches Leaders about Creating Great Organizations, Cambridge, MA: Harvard Business Press, 2003.
- with Kurt A. Raaflaub, Robert Wallace, Origins of Democracy in Ancient Greece, Berkeley, University of California Press, 2007. ISBN 9780520245624
- with Manville, Brook, The Civic Bargain: How Democracy Survives, Princeton University Press, 2023.

=== Edited ===
- with Eadie, J., The Craft of the Ancient Historian: Essays in Honor of Chester G. Starr, University Press of America: Lanham, 1985.
- with Euben, P., and Wallach, J., Athenian Political Thought and the Reconstruction of American Democracy, Cornell University Press: Ithaca, 1994.
- with Hedrick, C., Dēmokratia: A Conversation on Democracies, Ancient and Modern, Princeton University Press: Princeton, 1996.
