= Demopolis: Democracy Before Liberalism in Theory and Practice =

2017 book by Josiah Ober

- Author: Josiah Ober
- Language: English
- Subject: Democracy
- Publisher: Cambridge University Press
- Publication date: 2017
- Publication place: United Kingdom
- Media type: Print (hardcover · paperback)
- Pages: 204 (original);
- ISBN: 9781108226790

Demopolis: Democracy Before Liberalism in Theory and Practice is a work of political philosophy by Josiah Ober, published in 2017 by Cambridge University Press. The book provides an analytical framework for understanding the value of democracy itself, prior to and apart from its mixture with liberalism. The book argues that what results is "dignitarian democracy", where self-rule is defined and constrained by the value of human dignity. The book is based on lectures delivered by Ober in 2015 at Cambridge University's Centre for Political Thought.

== Contents & Structure ==
The book is organized into eight chapters:

- Preface: Democracy before Liberalism
- Chapter 1: Basic Democracy
- Chapter 2 - The Meaning of Democracy in Classical Athens
- Chapter 3 - Founding Demopolis
- Chapter 4 - Legitimacy and Civic Education
- Chapter 5 - Human Capacities and Civic Participation
- Chapter 6 - Civic Dignity and Other Necessary Conditions
- Chapter 7 - Delegation and Expertise
- Chapter 8 - A Theory of Democracy
- Epilogue - Democracy after Liberalism

== Summary ==
In Demopolis, Ober tackles basic questions about democracy. He asks, "What is democracy?", "Why does it arise", "How is it sustained", and "What is it good for?". Ober starts by pointing out that democracy has a history of its own, separate and apart from liberalism. A significant part of that history is centred on the democratic experience of Classical Athens. By investigating the etymology of the term "demokratia" in contrast to other Greek terms for regime types (e.g., "monarchia" or "oligarchia"), he claims that the original meaning of "democracy" was "collective self-governance by a socially diverse body of citizens, limited by constitutional laws that were also established by citizens". This is important because it calls into question the later understanding of democracy as simply the "tyranny of the majority" held by many subsequent critics (e.g., Alexis de Tocqueville in Democracy in America).

=== Founding Demopolis ===
In Chapter 3, Ober initiates a thought experiment where a diverse group of people with a low preference for autocracy found a new society - Demopolis. The purpose is to determine what sorts of values emerge for a people whose sole unifying value is non-tyranny. However, to form a viable society the persons in the group - the "Founders" or citizens - must have the capacity to achieve three ends of state. Firstly, they must be able to provide security to their members (e.g., protection against exogenous shocks such as hostile neighbours). Secondly, the society must be relatively prosperous. As Ober puts it, "residents have ample opportunity to gain wealth [...] that will allow them to pursue life plans beyond subsistence". And thirdly, no individual or faction monopolizes political authority (non-tyranny). Furthermore, Ober posits a utility function for each citizen. This utility function specifies how much the median citizen expects to pay (say, in terms of taxes or time) to secure various goods. First, each of the citizens expects to pay a hopefully small cost to acquire basic subsistence (ordinal rank 1 of the utility function). Second, the citizen expects to pay slightly more to secure public goods including state-level security, prosperity and non-tyranny (ordinal rank 2). And third, the citizen expects to pay the most on socially valued projects (as defined by the citizen; ordinal rank 3).

Ober proceeds to specify three rules which the Founders need to adopt if they wish to live in a state of non-tyranny. The first rule is that all citizens participate in the business of maintaining public goods so as to avoid the free-rider problem. This involves, at a minimum, devoting time deliberating on public issues, voting, taking personal responsibility for rule enforcement, paying taxes, and ensuring that no citizen is unable to sustain his or herself while fulfilling these functions. Thus, a basic amount of redistribution comes into the story of basic democracy as a condition of securing the three ends of state described above, rather than as a condition of social justice (as it does in, for example, John Rawls's A Theory of Justice). The second rule specifies the basic procedure for making future rules (i.e., legislation). This requires that non-consensual decisions be taken by a majoritarian decision rule. The third rule entrenches the general agreement on the three ends of the state as well as the rules concerning participation and legislation. This rule limits the citizen's collective ability to make subsequent rules that would threaten the three ends of state. In particular, citizens must not make any rule that would tend to make the state insecure, impoverished, or autocratic. An example of this would be to strip a minority of citizenship using a majority decision rule. The basic rules adopted by the Founders are meant to be the minimum necessary to achieve the three ends of state - security, prosperity, and non-tyranny. The basic rules governing participation, legislation, and entrenchment, once formulated, must be ratified by a process that is consistent with the three rules (i.e., voting as politically free and equal citizens). The act of ratification is also an act of consent to the new rules, and with that Demopolis (or as Ober also calls it, a basic democracy - a democracy before liberalism) is founded.

=== Legitimacy and Civic Education ===
In Chapter 4, Ober turns to the question of Demopolis's legitimacy to those subject to its rules, but who were not present at its founding. He discusses why they should obey the rules necessary to sustaining the regime. The first part of the argument concerns material and democratic goods. Why should new citizens, who may have a greater tolerance for autocracy, stay in Demopolis rather than defect to an autocratic regime where they do not have to pay the costs of self-government (e.g., voting, jury duty, paying taxes for the organisation of elections, etc.)?. Ober claims that the new citizens should only choose democracy over autocracy under three conditions: (1) there are goods reliably delivered by democracy that are unavailable or less abundant under an autocracy, no matter how benevolent, (2) those "democratic goods" are available only to those who pay participation costs, and, (3) the value of democratic goods outweighs the opportunity costs arising from public duties of participation.

To validate these three conditions, Ober points to literature that correlates democracy with economic development. He also cites work that claims status inequality is a driver of health inequalities, and therefore claims that, all else being equal, democracies should have better health outcomes compared to autocracies because of the inherent political equality of citizens. Ober also cites work which demonstrates that individuals were happier the better developed the institutions of direct democracy in Swiss cantons. However, these points are causal arguments explaining empirical correlations between democracy and desirable outcomes. In the next chapter Ober discusses what goods citizens can expect to benefit from that are inherent to participation in democratic governance.

=== Human Capacities and Civic Participation ===
In Chapter 5, Ober posits that humans have certain inherent characteristics and distinctive capacities. These are sociability, rationality, and communication. These are described as constitutive human capacities, and only in a democracy can these capacities be exercised at the highest level (i.e., in pursuit of joint political action). In other words, only in a democracy can citizens freely and openly employ reason and communication to make decisions regarding the common good. These goods exist without the addition of liberalism to democracy.

=== Civic Dignity and Other Necessary Conditions ===
In Chapter 6, Ober tackles the question of how basic democracy can deliver material prosperity and security without autocracy. The argument starts by making three assumptions about human beings and their environment: (1) humans are methodologically individualistic (social phenomena are explained strictly in terms of the decisions of individuals), (2) interdependence is an imperative for cooperation (under high-stakes conditions such as climate change, humans must cooperate to overcome challenges), and, (3) the environment is mutable (e.g., the state is subject to technological change, war, climate change, etc.). Taking the example of climate change, an autocracy may be able to overcome the challenge by simply imposing solutions. A basic democracy, however, must credibly show that it too is able to overcome the challenge of climate change without sacrificing liberty, equality, and dignity. How might it do this?

Ober claims that free individuals who do not need to worry about a tyrannical government expropriating their labour will rationally invest in themselves thereby increasing the return to specialisation and comparative advantage. This will increase the joint stock of human capital and specialised knowledge. These in turn will increase the material prosperity of society and the knowledge available for society to overcome challenges in a changing environment.

Later in the chapter the book also shows how civic dignity in a democracy can be sustained in a self-reinforcing equilibrium in a population of self-interested individuals.

=== Delegation and Expertise ===
In Chapter 7, Ober tackles two questions. The first is how the people can retain control of the state if representatives decided to capture the state. The second is how the people can use expert knowledge to make high-quality decisions. Regarding the first question, he argues that in order to see off potential state capture by elected representatives, the demos must have a credible threat to rule via some sort of direct democracy procedure. The mere existence of this procedure may be enough to incentivise representatives to craft legislation in line with the preferences and interests of the people. Regarding the second question, Ober advocates the use of a combination of democratically appointed citizens councils and the use of relevant expertise aggregation methods.

=== A Theory of Democracy ===
The final main chapter synthesizes the conceptual arguments into a theory: basic democracy is a "solution to the puzzle of how, within a competitive ecology of states, a large and diverse body of people might create a stable political order that is at once secure, prosperous and nonautocratic". The values of political liberty, political equality, and civic dignity naturally emerge from basic democracy, without the need to impose a liberal superstructure. It generates collective goods—security, prosperity, non-tyranny—that justify the burdens of participation. Basic democracy requires justification for the exclusion of non-citizens from the status of citizen, civic education to justify, using rational arguments, the benefits of non-tyranny and participation to residents, and it must devise mechanisms to make use of expert knowledge in social decision making. Importantly, basic democracy must also include a mechanism to enable the demos to govern themselves in the case of attempted elite capture of the state.

Finally, Ober asks the question "so what". Why should anyone care about what democracy looks like without liberalism? He notes that Western interventions in the Middle East in the beginning of the 21st century designed partly to promote democracy were "arguably based on a muddled set of ideas about democracy". Little to no distinction was made between liberal values and democratic values, and therefore a liberal-democratic model was imposed on Iraq, for example, without adequately separating the desire for citizen self-government from that of a liberal regime.

== Reviews ==
- Roslyn Fuller - LA Review of Books: Roslyn Fuller praised Ober's distinction between “basic democracy” and liberalism. She notes that Ober demonstrates how democratic systems—such as those in ancient Greece—thrived without liberal values and thus refutes the notion that modern liberalism is essential for democracy to survive. While she critiques the book's academic density and jargon—like Ober's “relevant expertise aggregation”—she highlights its key contribution: showing that democracy, when centered on civic dignity and free from paternalistic infantilization, can flourish even in non-liberal contexts. Fuller emphasizes that recognizing the conceptual separation between democracy and liberalism not only deepens political theory, but also has far-reaching implications for promoting democracy in less liberal or autocratic societies.
- Barton Swaim - Wall Street Journal: "Demopolis is a tightly reasoned work of scholarship ... Mr Ober is an excellent writer and his argument is worth the effort. He believes today's liberals, following the political philosopher John Rawls, conflate liberalism and democracy in ways that make it difficult to assess one without the other."
- J. Heyrman - Choice: "Ober concludes that basic democracy might form an alternative foundation in light of current challenges to liberalism, such as populist nationalism. This conclusion will not convince all, but Ober's work is thorough and thought-provoking. Highly Recommended."
