= Giuseppe Colosi =

Italian zoologist (1892–1975)

- Born: 29 March 1892; Petralia Sottana, Italy
- Died: 20 October 1975 (aged 83); Florence, Italy
- Occupation: Zoologist
- Scientific career
- Fields: Zoology

Giuseppe Colosi (29 March 1892 – 20 October 1975) was an Italian zoologist. He specialized in the study of crustaceans and mysids in particular.

Colosi was born in Petralia Sottana. From 1920 to 1924, he taught in Turin, and he was the head of the zoological institute of the University of Florence from 1940 to 1962. He died in Florence, aged 83.

Colosi is commemorated in the scientific name of a species of lizard, Chalcides colosii.

== See also ==
- Ethology Ecology & Evolution
