= Unione Zoologica Italiana =

Unione Zoologica Italiana is an Italian scientific society devoted to Zoology especially that of Italy.

The Society was founded in 1900. Publications include (from 2006) The Italian Journal of Zoology previously (from 1930), published under the name of Il Bollettino di Zoologia.Archivio zoologico italiano : pubblicato sotto gli auspicii della unione zoologica precedes this (from 1902) , which replaced Monitore zoologico italiano reflecting the loose associations of zoologists and anatomists also using the title Unione Zoologica Italiana prior to the formal grouping of 1900.

The Society collaborates with La Società Entomologica Italiana, the Italian Entomological Society in maintaining a website listing the Italian Fauna FaunaItalia.

The endemic Spectacled Salamander is the emblem of the Society.

== See also ==
- Ethology Ecology & Evolution
