= Giulio Chiarugi =

Italian anatomist & politician (1859–1944)

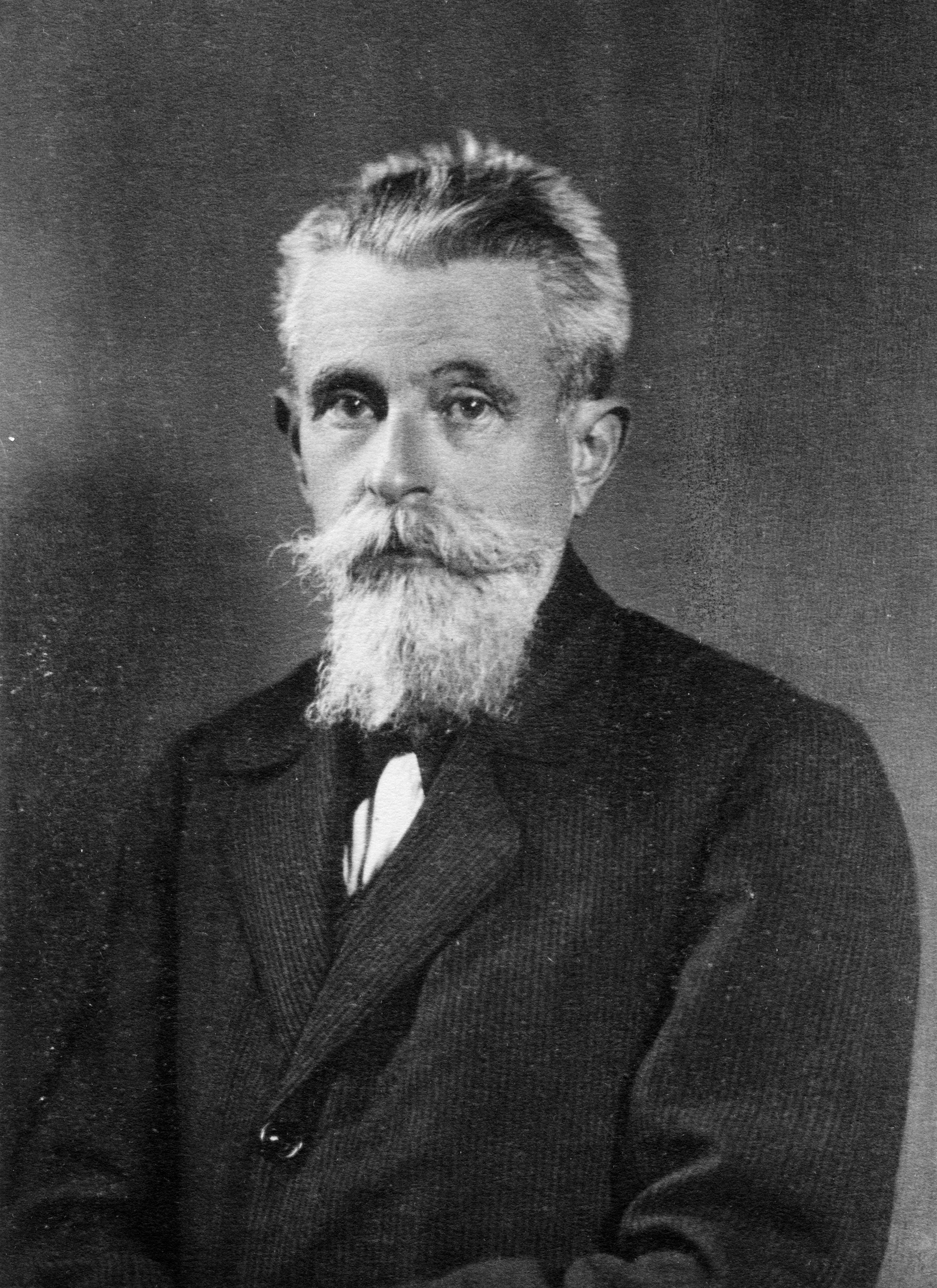
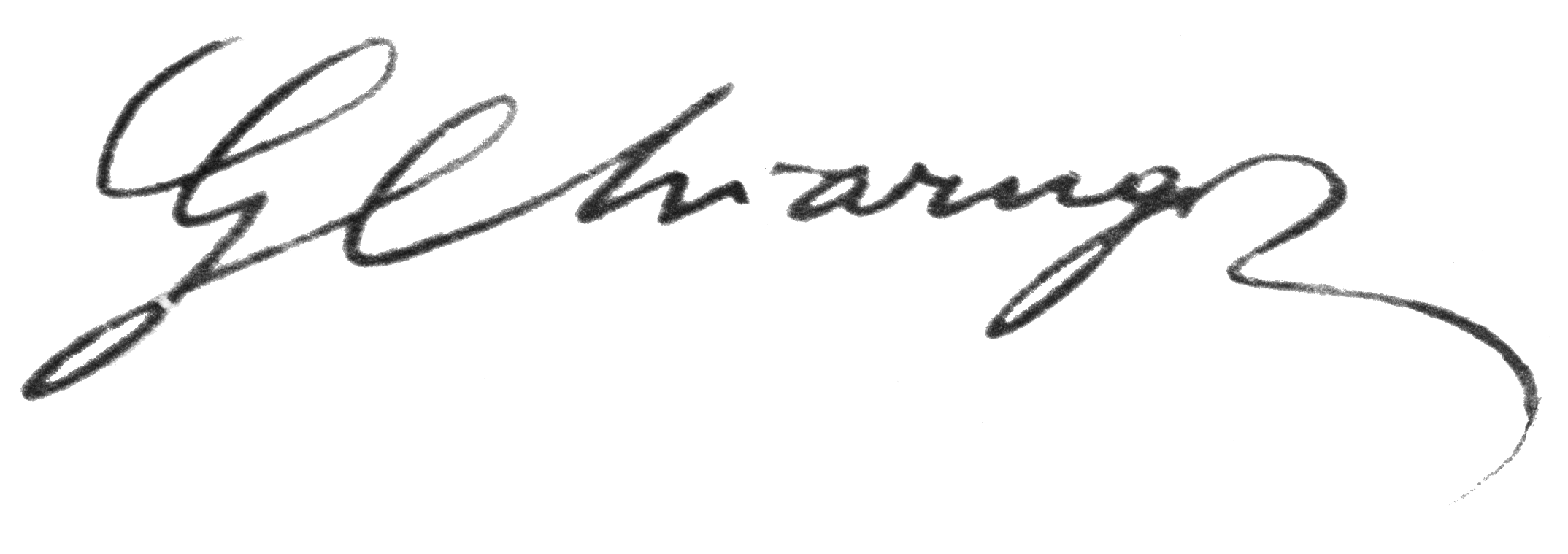

Giulio Chiarugi (28 January 1859 – 17 March 1944) was an Italian anatomist and embryologist. He was one of the founders of experimental embryology in Italy and wrote a landmark treatise on embryology, Trattato di embriologia (1944). He also founded the zoological journal Monitore Zoológico Italiano in 1890.

== Life and work ==
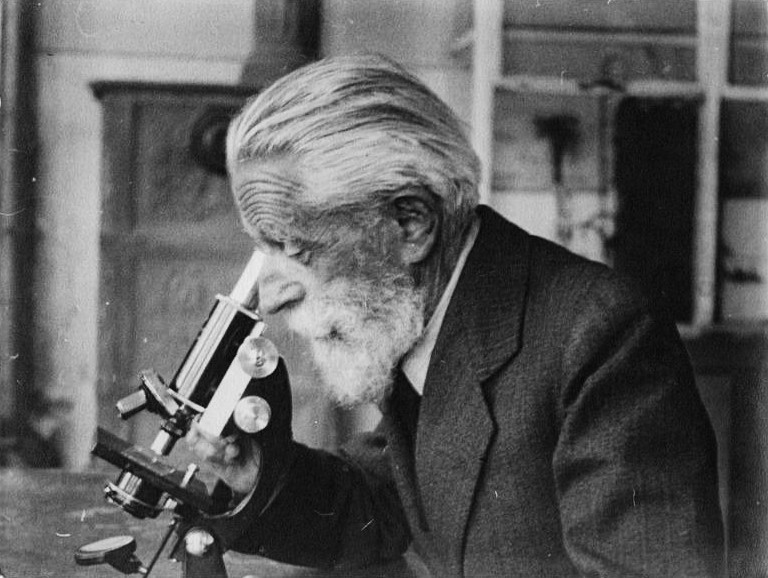

Chiarugi was born in Castelletto di Chiusdino, Siena to craftsman Pietro and Elisa from Puglia. Educated at Siena, he studied medicine briefly there before moving to Turin to graduate in 1882. He took an interest anatomical research at the anatomical institute under Guglielmo Romiti. He succeeded Romiti in 1886 and in 1888 became a professor of anatomy at the University of Siena. In 1890 he moved to the University of Florence to succeed Alessandro Tafani. Chiarugi worked at the intersection of zoology, embryology, and anatomy. He founded the interdisciplinary journal Monitore Zoológico Italiano in 1890 along with Eugenio Ficalbi, and in 1910 it became the journal of the Unione Zoológica Italiana and in 1929 of the Società Italiana di Anatomí. It is now known by the title Ethology Ecology & Evolution. He was Dean of medicine from 1891-92 until 1923-24 when he became rector. He resigned in 1924. One of his major findings was that the embryological development of the heart, noting that pulsations began very early in embryonic development. Another study was on the size of brains of Italians. Chiarugi influenced several Italian anatomists including Lorenzo Bianchi, Luigi Castaldi, Ciardi-Dupré, Livini, and Rutilio Staderini.

In June 1900 he was elected to the Parliament in Siena as a member of the Radical Party and one of his actions was to reduce the work hours of hospital nurses. He was a councilor for the city of Florence in 1909 and became a mayor of the city for 1909–1910. His son Alberto Chiarugi (1901-1960) became a noted botanist.
