= Angelicque White =

American oceanographer

- Partner: Jennifer DeVries (2002–d.2012)

Academic background
- Education: BS, Biology, 1998, MS, Biology, 2001, University of Alabama in Huntsville; PhD, Biological Oceanography, 2006, Oregon State University
- Thesis: Phosphorus physiology and environmental forcing of oceanic cyanobacteria, primarily Trichodesmium spp. (2006)

Angelicque E. White is an American oceanographer. She is a professor at the University of Hawaiʻi at Mānoa School of Ocean and Earth Science and Technology and director of the Hawaii Ocean Time-series (HOT) program.

== Early life and education ==
White earned her Bachelor of Science and Master of Science degree from the University of Alabama in Huntsville before enrolling at Oregon State University for her PhD in Biological Oceanography. She conducted her postdoctoral research with Ricardo Letelier and the Hawaii Ocean Time-series (HOT) program.

== Career ==
Upon completing her PhD, White became an assistant professor at Oregon State University. Her research focus remained on "understanding how specific organisms acquire the elements necessary for growth and how different nutrient sources impact primary productivity and particle export." During her tenure at Oregon State, she participated in various expeditions, including to the Great Pacific Garbage Patch, and received a 2012 Sloan Research Fellowship. White also took pictures while studying marine phytoplankton which were then displayed at the Corvallis Arts Center in an exhibition titled The Art of Plankton: Form Follows Function. In 2015, she received the Yentsch-Schindler Early Career Award in recognition of her contributions to research, science training, and broader societal issues. She was also promoted to the role of associate professor from 2015 until 2018 when she left to join the faculty at the University of Hawaiʻi at Mānoa.

Upon joining the faculty at the University of Hawai‘i at Mānoa School of Ocean and Earth Science and Technology, White replaced Karl as leader of the HOT program. She also received funding from the National Science Foundation to continue the program for five more years.

In 2020, White's 2019 TED talk about ocean microbes and the changing climate made the list of the most watched TED talks

== Research ==
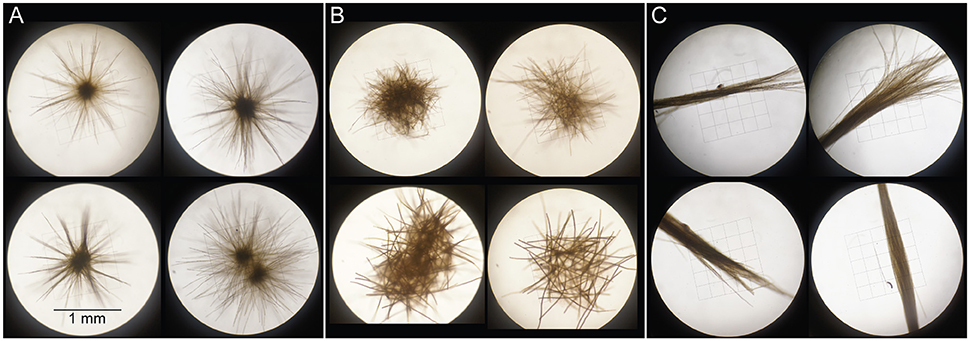
White's research interests include the phytoplankton Trichodesmium

White's Ph.D. research examined the factors controlling the bloom forming marine phytoplankton Trichodesmium. White's past research includes harmful algal blooms and microplastics.

== Personal life ==
White was engaged in a long-term partnership with Jennifer DeVries from 2002 until her death in 2012.

== Selected publications ==
- White, Angelicque E.; Spitz, Yvette H.; Karl, David M.; Letelier, Ricardo M. (2006). "Flexible elemental stoichiometry in Trichodesmium spp. and its ecological implications". Limnology and Oceanography. 51 (4): 1777–1790. Bibcode:2006LimOc..51.1777W. doi:10.4319/lo.2006.51.4.1777. ISSN 1939-5590.
- Moisander, P. H.; Beinart, R. A.; Hewson, I.; White, A. E.; Johnson, K. S.; Carlson, C. A.; Montoya, J. P.; Zehr, J. P. (2010-03-19). "Unicellular Cyanobacterial Distributions Broaden the Oceanic N2 Fixation Domain". Science. 327 (5972): 1512–1514. Bibcode:2010Sci...327.1512M. doi:10.1126/science.1185468. ISSN 0036-8075. PMID 20185682. S2CID 206524855.

== Honors and awards ==
- ASLO Yentsch-Schindler Early Career Award (2016)
- AGU Early Career Award (2016)
- Oregon State University Inspirational Woman Award (2015)
- Alfred P. Sloan Research Fellowship (2012)
- National Academy of Science Kavli Fellow (2010)
