= Paul Reuter (composer) =

American classical composer

Paul Reuter (St. Louis, 1945) is an American composer.

He received his Master of Arts in Music Composition from the University of Missouri-Columbia, and he studied in the United Kingdom with Peter Maxwell Davies.

His compositions have been performed by the St. Louis Symphony Orchestra, the Hartford Symphony Orchestra, the Fires of London, guitarist Timothy Walker, The 442s, soprano Christine Brewer, St. Louis Women's Chorale and others. His works have been broadcast on National Public Radio, American Public Radio, and the BBC.

Reuter was Executive Director of the Sheldon Concert Hall and is currently the Executive Director ex officio of Arts & Faith St. Louis.

== Selected works ==
- "Variations on Vivaldi's Guitar Concerto" - guitar and orchestra
- "1492 Overture" - guitar and orchestra
- "Four Saints" - chamber orchestra
- "We Have a Dream" - children's choir and orchestra
- "Sojourner Truth" - actress and chamber ensemble
- "Love Will Never Die" - trumpet, organ, and vocals
