= Eugenio Ficalbi =

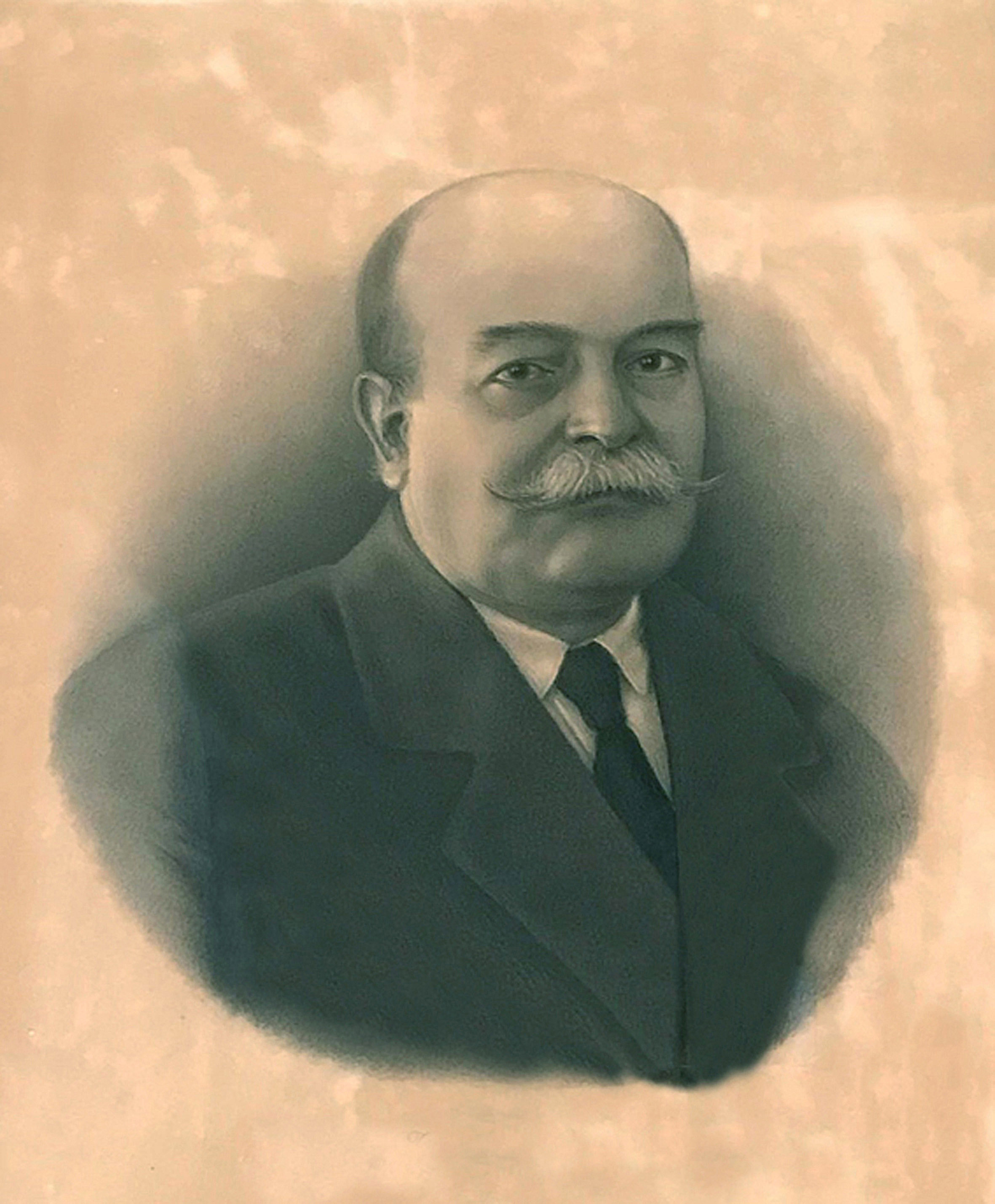

Eugenio Ficalbi (9 March 1858 – 16 December 1922) was an Italian entomologist and zoologist. The mosquito genus Ficalbia is named in his honour by F. V. Theobald in 1903. A second genus Pseudoficalbia was also named by Theobald in 1912.

Ficalbi was born in Piombino, the son of engineer Aristodemo and Anna Rosellini. He studied medicine at Siena from 1883 and shifted to natural sciences in 1889 in Florence. He worked as an assistant to the zoologist Sebastiano Richiardi at the University of Pisa from 1883 to 1888. He then worked as a ship doctor for some years before becoming a teacher at the Siena Gymnasium and then took up an associate professorship at Sassari. He then moved from there to Cagliari (1890), Messina (1895) and Padua (1900) before moving to the University of Pisa in 1905 as a successor to Richiardi.

Ficalbi was especially interested in comparative anatomy which he applied in systematics. He had a special interest in the Culicidae of Italy and worked on a complete revision of the mosquitoes of Italy. He also worked on the skulls of moray eels and the histology of the amphibian integument, the bones of the ear of mammals and the skull of the gecko and other reptiles. He was interested in the evolution of the periotic capsule. He wrote a treatise on zoology Zoologia generale (1895-98). Along with Giulio Chiarugi he founded the journal Monitore zoologico italiano in 1890 which became Ethology Ecology & Evolution in 1989.

Ficalbi also presided over the Tuscan Society of Natural Sciences and was a member of the Italian Zoological Union and served as a director of the Agricultural Society of Pisa.
