= Balzan Prize =

Award for human endeavor

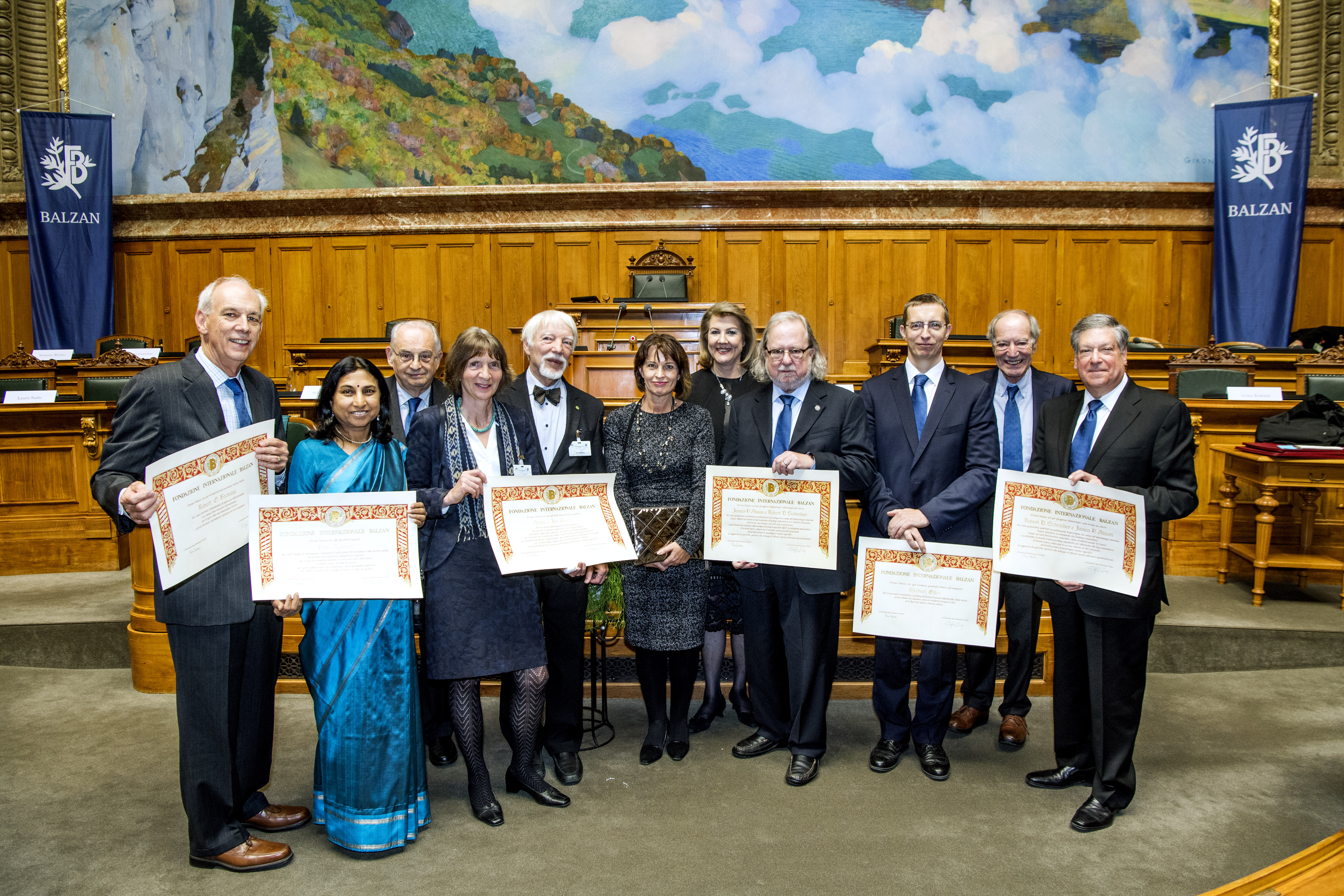
- Balzan Prize 2017 ceremony in Bern
- Awarded for: Achievements in the natural sciences, humanities and culture
- Country: Switzerland
- First award: 1961
- Website: www.balzan.org/en/balzan-prize

The Balzan Prize is a group of four monetary awards given by the International Balzan Prize Foundation. The prizes are awarded to people or organizations who have made outstanding achievements in the fields of humanities, natural sciences, culture, as well as for endeavours for peace and the brotherhood of man.

== History ==
The assets behind the foundation were established by the Italian Eugenio Balzan (it) (1874–1953), a part-owner of Corriere della Sera who had invested his assets in Switzerland and in 1933 had left Italy in protest against fascism. He left a substantial inheritance to his daughter Angela Lina Balzan (1892–1956), who at the time was suffering an incurable disease. Before her death, she left instructions for the foundation and since then it has two headquarters, the Prize administered from Milan, the Fund from Zurich.

The first award was in fact one million Swiss francs to the Nobel Foundation in 1961. After 1962, a gap of 16 years followed when prizes recommenced with an award of half a million Swiss francs to Mother Teresa. Award ceremonies alternate between Bern and the Accademia dei Lincei in Rome, and frequently winners have later won a Nobel Prize.

== Procedure ==
All awards are decided by a single committee. The Balzan Prize committee comprises twenty members of the prestigious learned societies of Europe.

Each year the foundation chooses the fields eligible for the next year's prizes, and determines the prize amount. These are generally announced in May, with the winners announced the September the following year.

== Rewards ==
From 2001 the prize money increased to 1 million Swiss Francs per prize, on condition that half the money is used for projects involving young researchers.

As of 2017, the amount of each of the four Balzan Prizes was 750,000 Swiss francs (approx. €760,000; $750,000; £660,000).

== Categories ==
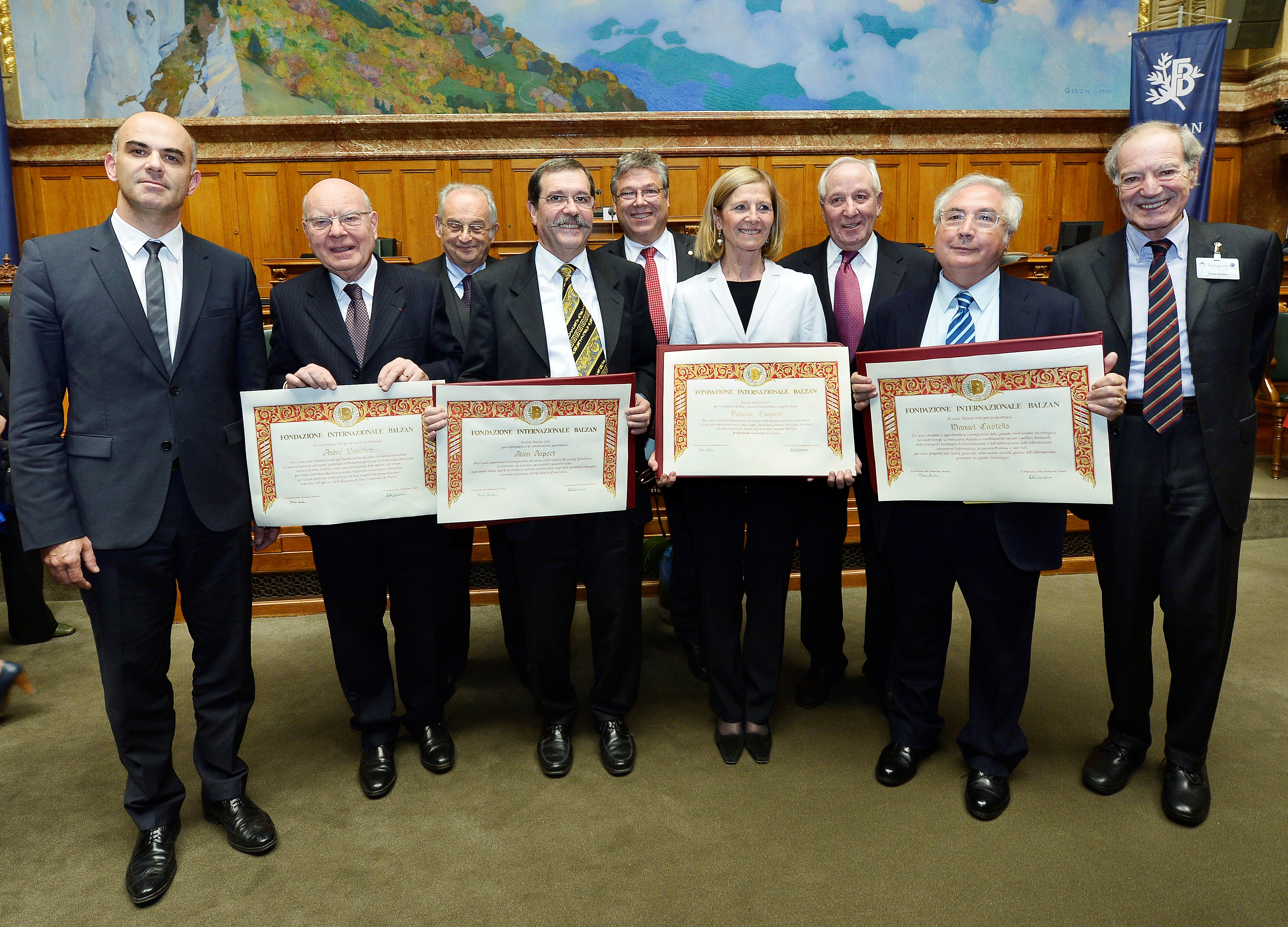
Balzan Prize 2013 ceremony in Bern.

Four prizes have been awarded annually since 1978. The award fields vary each year and can be related to either a specific or an interdisciplinary field. The prizes go beyond the traditional subjects both in the humanities (literature, the moral sciences and the arts) and in the sciences (medicine and the physical, mathematical and natural sciences), with an emphasis on innovative research.

In different fields the prize is considered a significant prize, for example in sociology.

Every three to seven years the foundation also awards the Prize for humanity, peace and brotherhood among peoples. It was awarded in 2014 to Vivre en Famille.

== Recipients ==
- See: List of Balzan Prize recipients

== See also ==
- List of general science and technology awards
- List of astronomy awards
- Prizes named after people
