= Vienna Agreement =

The Vienna Agreement may refer to one of the following agreements:

- The Vienna Literary Agreement from 1850, which laid the foundation for a common Serbo-Croatian language
- The Vienna Agreement Establishing an International Classification of the Figurative Elements of Marks (1973), a treaty establishing an international classification system for trademarks
- The Vienna Agreement on standards (1991) between the International Organization for Standardization (ISO) and the European Committee for Standardization (CEN)

== See also ==
- Treaty of Vienna
- Vienna Award (disambiguation), two agreements before and during World War II that expanded the territory of Hungary
- Vienna Conference (disambiguation)
- Vienna Convention (disambiguation)
