= International Law Commission =

Organization codifying international law

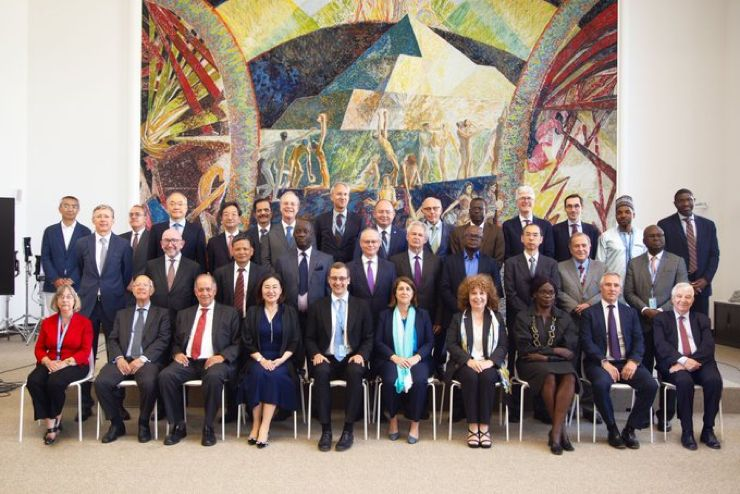
Members of the International Law Commission for the 2023–2027 term in Geneva

The International Law Commission (ILC) is a body of experts responsible for helping develop and codify international law. It is composed of 34 individuals recognized for their expertise and qualifications in international law, who are elected by the United Nations General Assembly (UNGA) every five years.

The ideological roots of the ILC originated as early as the 19th century when the Congress of Vienna in Europe developed several international rules and principles to regulate conduct among its members. Following several attempts to develop and rationalize international law in the early 20th century, the ILC was formed in 1947 by the UNGA pursuant to the Charter of the United Nations, which calls on the Assembly to help develop and systematize international law. The Commission held its first session in 1949, with its initial work influenced by the Second World War and subsequent concerns about international crimes such as genocide and acts of aggression.

The ILC has since held annual sessions at the U.N. Office at Geneva to discuss and debate various topics in international law and develop international legal principles accordingly. It is responsible for several foundational developments in international law, including the Vienna Convention on the Law of Treaties, which establishes a framework for forming and interpreting treaties, and the International Criminal Court, the first permanent tribunal tasked with adjudicating offenses such as genocide and crimes against humanity.

== Origin ==
Several attempts were made throughout history to codify international law, in particular the rules and principles of customary international law (a universal unwritten law that nonetheless binds sovereign states). The work that led to the International Law Commission was begun in the Resolution of the Assembly of the League of Nations of 22 September 1924, which established the Committee of Experts for the Progressive Codification of International Law, consisting of 17 members, for the purpose of making recommendations as to which issues required to be addressed in international law and the steps desirable to that end. The Committee's work led to the League of Nations Codification Conference 1930, which dealt mainly with the issues of nationality laws, territorial waters and state responsibility for damage caused to foreign nationals.

Many concepts of the 1930 conference were adopted in the Charter of the United Nations, which established the successor organization to the League. Article 13, Paragraph 1 therein states:

1. The General Assembly shall initiate studies and make recommendations for the purpose of: a. ... encouraging the progressive development of international law and its codification.

Pursuant to this provision, on December 11, 1946, the General Assembly passed Resolution 94, which called to establish a committee of legal experts to make recommendations to the UN Secretary-General on the ways the General Assembly could encourage the progressive development of international law and its codification. The committee of experts consisted of 17 members and convened from May 12 to June 17, 1947. It recommended to establish a permanent UN commission to promote these objectives.

On November 21, 1947, the UN General Assembly passed Resolution 174, which provided for the creation of an "International Law Commission" in order to fulfill the obligations of the Charter. To the resolution was attached the statute of the Commission, which defined its purposes as:

- Promoting the codification of international law.
- Solving problems within both public and private international law.

Working procedures for the Commission were elaborated in articles 16-26.

Under the leadership of Sir Michael Wood, the ILC undertook an authoritative effort to codify customary international law. The ILC produced the Conclusions on Identification of Customary International Law (ILC Conclusions), which seeks to clarify the process by which to identify customary international law.

== Working procedures of the ILC ==
The work of the Commission is regulated by its statute, which was initially approved by the General Assembly on November 21, 1947, and amended on December 12, 1950, December 3, 1955, and November 18, 1981.

It consists of 34 members (originally 15) who all must be experts on international law, elected to the position by the General Assembly from a list of candidates nominated by governments of member states in the UN. Members act as individuals and not as officials representing their respective states.

One venue of action for the commission in the codification of principles of international law is when requested to do so by the General Assembly. In that case, the commission appoints one of its members as Special Rapporteur on that subject and prepares a plan of work regarding the issue in question. Governments are requested to submit to the commission their written opinions on the issue in question, as specified in the plan of work. The rapporteur then writes a report of his or her recommendations on the subject under discussion and the report must be approved by the rest of the commission as well as by the UN Secretary-General before it becomes an official commission document. The commission then reconsiders the report after receiving additional written opinions from governments, and the report is submitted to the General Assembly for approval.

Another venue of action is when the commission is requested either by a government, an inter-governmental organization or a UN agency to draft proposals for international conventions on various issues. In that case, the commission formulates a plan of work and receives written opinions from governments on the issue in question. The final draft is also submitted to the General Assembly.

The commission also works independently of external requests by its regular work of considering questions of international law. Also in these cases, all recommendations for actions are submitted to the General Assembly for final approval. The commission's independent deliberations usually take place in its annual sessions.

== Membership ==
The members of the Commission for the 2023–2027 term are:

Name	Nationality	Term
Dapo Akande	GBR	2023–2027
Carlos J. Argüello Gómez	NCA	2023–2027
Masahiko Asada	JPN	2023–2027
Bogdan Aurescu	ROU	2023–2027
Yacouba Cissé	CIV	2023–2027
Ahmed Amin Fathalla	EGY	2023–2027
Rolf Einar Fife	NOR	2023–2027
Mathias Forteau	FRA	2023–2027
George Rodrigo Bandeira Galindo	BRA	2023–2027
Patrícia Galvão Teles	POR	2023–2027
Claudio Grossman Guiloff	CHI	2023–2027
Huikang Huang	CHN	2023–2027
Charles C. Jalloh	SLE	2023–2027
Ahmed Laraba	ALG	2023–2027
Keun-Gwan Lee	KOR	2023–2027
Vilawan Mangklatanakul	THA	2023–2027
Andreas D. Mavroyiannis	CYP	2023–2027
Ivon Mingashang	COD	2023–2027
Giuseppe Nesi	ITA	2023–2027
Hong Thao Nguyen	VIE	2023–2027
Phoebe Okowa	KEN	2023–2027
Nilüfer Oral	TUR	2023–2027
Hassan Ouazzani Chahdi	MAR	2023–2027
Mario Oyarzábal	ARG	2023–2027
Mārtiņš Paparinskis	LAT	2023–2027
Bimal N. Patel	IND	2023–2027
August Reinisch	AUT	2023–2027
Penelope Ridings	NZL	2023–2027
Juan José Ruda Santolaria	PER	2023–2027
Alioune Sall	SEN	2023–2027
Louis Savadogo	BFA	2023–2027
Munkh-Orgil Tsend	MGL	2023–2027
Marcelo Vázquez-Bermúdez	ECU	2023–2027
Evgeny Zagaynov	RUS	2023–2027

== Annual sessions of the commission ==
The commission's main function since its establishment has been its annual sessions, starting from 1949. At first, the proceedings of these sessions were kept in a mimeographed form and were not available to the public, but on December 3, 1955, the General Assembly passed resolution 987, which required the publication of a summary of the proceedings of these meetings in a special yearbook designated for this purpose, and this in order to make the information available to both public and governments. For the 1st session, proceedings have been published in one volume, but starting from the 2nd session, proceedings have been published in two volumes – the first containing a summary of the deliberations and the second containing documents adopted at that session.

At the beginning of each session, the commission elects one of its members to serve as its chairman until the next session.

=== 1940s sessions ===
- 1st session, 1949

The 1st session was held in Lake Success, New York from April 12 to June 9, 1949. The agenda for the first session was prepared by the General Assembly throughout 1947–1948. In resolution 177 (November 21, 1947), the Assembly charged the commission with formulating principles based on the judgement of the Nuremberg Tribunal and drafting a new code of offences against the peace of mankind. Resolution 178 (of the same day) charged the commission with preparing a document on the rights and duties of states in international law. Resolution 260 (December 9, 1948) instructed the commission to consider the establishment of a criminal chamber within the International Court of Justice, for prosecuting political leaders guilty of crimes against international law.

The election of the 15 commission members by the General Assembly took place on November 3, 1948.

The first session of the commission was held in Lake Success, New York, United States, from April 12 to June 9, 1949. The agenda for the session consisted of six items:

- Making a general survey of topics of international law that require codification into treaties and conventions.
- The rights and duties of states.
- The Nuremberg Principles and the definition of crimes against the peace of mankind.
- Possibility of establishing a judicial body to prosecute leaders guilty of genocide.
- Finding ways to make the rules and documents of international law more available to the public and scholars.
- Cooperation by the ILC with other UN agencies.

At the very first meeting, US commission member Manley O. Hudson was elected chairman of the commission for the duration of that session, while the Soviet member Vladimir Koretsky was elected first vice-chairman and Indian member Benegal Rau was elected second vice-chairman.

During that session, disagreement arose between the members as to whether the commission was entitled to include a topic on its agenda without prior consent of the General Assembly. On this issue, the commission decided that it was competent to do so, by a vote of 10 to 3.

Regarding the range of issues to be included in the agenda for the codification of international law, the commission decided to start working on a limited number of subjects at first. For that reason, it was decided to exclude at the time the issue of laws of war from the commission's discussions. The highest priority was given to the topics of law of treaties, arbitration, and regime of the sea, and rapporteurs were elected accordingly.

Another topic under discussion was the declaration of the rights and duties of states. It was decided to exclude the issue of right of asylum from the proposed draft, and to discuss the matter further at the 2nd session.

Other issues postponed until the 2nd session were:

- The formulation of the Nuremberg Principles and the list of offences against the peace of mankind.
- The issue of universal criminal jurisdiction.
- Making texts of international law more available.
- Cooperation with governments and UN agencies.

The commission approved a Draft Declaration on the Rights and Duties of States, which was the main legal document adopted at that session. A large portion of the work on this issue was done by the Panamanian representative Ricardo Joaquín Alfaro Jované. The draft declaration was referred to the General Assembly for further deliberations, but in its resolution 596 of December 7, 1951, the Assembly decided to postpone any further discussions on the document.

The commission also decided about the time and place of the 2nd session to be held. It was decided to hold it in Geneva, starting from May 1950, for a maximum period of 10 weeks.

=== 1950s sessions ===
- 2nd session, 1950

The 2nd session was held in Geneva from June 5 to July 29, 1950. The chairman of that session was Georges Scelle. The agenda and the final resolutions of the session were as follows:

- Original item: Report of the 1st session and the draft declaration on the rights and duties of states, both of which were now approved by the General Assembly. Decision: the commission took note of that without taking further action.
- Original item: The General Assembly recommendation to give priority to the issue of territorial waters. Decision: the commission accepted the recommendation.
- Original item: Formulation of the Nuremberg Principles and the draft code of crimes against the peace and security of mankind. Decision: the commission formulated a set of seven principles to be referred to as "Nuremberg Principles", dealing with responsibility of states and individuals in cases of crimes against humanity being committed.
- Original item: The desirability and possibility of establishing an international court to try political leaders guilty of genocide. Decision: the commission passed resolutions to the effect that the creation of such a court was desirable and possible. However, the creation of such a court was postponed until further discussions.
- Original item: Law of treaties. Decision: the commission postponed decisions until further study.
- Original item: Arbitral procedure between states. Decision: the commission was unable to reach an agreement on compulsory arbitration procedures, and the issue was postponed until further consideration.
- Original item: Regime of the high seas. Decision: the commission determined that every ship on the high seas must have only one nationality flag for identification purposes. However, it was unable to agree on the rest of the issues relating to the regime of the high seas.
- Original item: Ways of making texts of international law more available. Decision: the commission recommended that wide distribution be made of UN publications on international law and that the UN begin publications of documentary series on international tribunals and national laws and constitutions of various states. In addition, the commission recommended to the General Assembly to formulate an international convention to regulate the exchange of legal publications between governments.
- Original item: Right of asylum. Decision: the commission decided to postpone any deliberations on the subject, since the issue was under discussion by the International Court of Justice.
- Original item: Cooperation of the commission with other UN agencies, governments and other national and international organizations.
- Original item: Date and place of the 3rd session. Decision: the commission decided it should be held in Geneva for a maximum period of 12 weeks starting from May 1951.

The conduct of the 2nd session was influenced by the East-West rift resulting from the Cold War. Already at the first meeting of that session, the Soviet member Koretsky protested that the People's Republic of China (PRC) was not represented on the commission, claiming it represented the Chinese people and not the Republic of China (ROC), now ruling in Taiwan only. He demanded the Chinese member of the commission be replaced by a member from mainland China. Commission chairman Scelle opposed the Soviet demand, claiming that each member represented his own legal views rather than any government position. The commission accepted Hudson's position by the vote of 10 to 1, and Koretsky in protest left the session without attending any further meetings. A letter of protest by the PRC government against the representation of the ROC at the commission was presented to the commission on June 8, but no further action was taken in that regard.

- 3rd session, 1951

The 3rd session was held in Geneva from May 16 to July 27, 1951. The agenda of the session was as follows:

- Item: General Assembly recommendations for revisions of the commission's statute. Decision: the commission made a partial report on the matter.
- Item: The draft code of offenses against the peace of mankind. Decision: the commission formulated a draft.
- Item: Duties of states in the event of the outbreak of hostilities. Decision: the commission decided to proceed with a definition of aggression in general terms.
- Item: Law of treaties. Decision: the commission made a series of recommendations regarding the acceptance of reservations to multilateral treaties.
- Item: Arbitral procedure.
- Item: Regime of the high seas. Decision: the issue was postponed until further study.
- Item: Date and place of the 4th session. Decision: the commission decided to hold the next session in Geneva for a period of ten weeks, starting from around June 1.
- Item: Draft international convention or conventions for the elimination of statelessness. Decision: the issue was postponed until further study.
- Item: Cooperation by the commission with other bodies. Decision: no definite decision was made.
- Item: Development of a 20-year program for achieving peace through the United Nations. Decision: no definite decision was made.
- Item: General Assembly comments on the report of the 2nd session.

The conduct of the session was influenced by other international events, as the Syrian representative Faris El-Khouri was absent from the early meetings due to UN deliberations of Syrian complaints against Israel.

- 4th session, 1952

The 4th session was held in Geneva from June 4 to August 8, 1952.

Much of the session was dedicated to the issue of arbitral procedure, on which the commission adopted a preliminary draft, consisting of 32 articles.

- 5th session, 1953

The 5th session was held in Geneva from June 1 to August 14, 1953.

As was done at the opening meeting of the 2nd session, also at this session, the Soviet representative Feodor I. Kozhevnikov demanded to dismiss the representative of the ROC and appoint a representative of the PRC in his place. The motion was denied this time as well, but the Soviet member did not walk out on the session as was done in 1950.

The commission began work on drafting a convention to reduce the problem of statelessness.

- 6th session, 1954

The 6th session was held in Paris from June 3 to July 28, 1954.

At the opening of the session, the chairman of UNESCO expressed greeting to the commission for holding a session at the seat of the organization.

The commission formulated a draft convention for the reduction of statelessness and a draft code of crimes against the peace of mankind.

- 7th session, 1955

The 7th session was held in Geneva from May 2 to July 8, 1955.

The commission adopted Provisional articles concerning the regime of the high seas, which stipulated among other things, that the high seas do not belong to any country and cannot be controlled by any government. It also decided to request the UN Secretary General to start regular publication of the commission's sessions in order to make them available for the public. This decision led to General Assembly resolution 987, which paved the way to orderly publication of the commission's yearbook.

- 8th session, 1956

The 8th session was held in Geneva from April 23 to July 4, 1956.

The session's agenda consisted of the following items:

- Regime of the high seas
- The territorial waters of countries having access to the sea
- The law of treaties, which means the creation of uniform rules for the negotiation, formulation, signature and implementation of treaties
- Diplomatic practices
- Consular practices
- State responsibility

The commission began consideration of the law of treaties. In this regard, it considered the report of its special rapporteur Gerald Fitzmaurice, but no decision was arrived at. This first debate on the law of treaties eventually led to the Vienna Convention on the Law of Treaties in 1969.

- 9th session, 1957

The 9th session was held in Geneva from April 23 to June 28, 1957.

- 10th session, 1958

The 10th session was held in Geneva from April 28 to July 4, 1958.

- 11th session, 1959

The 11th session was held in Geneva from April 20 to June 26, 1959.

=== 1960s sessions ===
- 12th session, 1960

The 12th session was held in Geneva from April 25 to July 1, 1960.

- 13th session, 1961

The 13 session was held in Geneva from May 1 to July 7, 1961.

- 14th session, 1962

The 14th session was held in Geneva from April 24 to June 29, 1962.

- 15th session, 1963

The 15th session was held in Geneva from May 6 to July 12, 1963.

- 16th session, 1964

The 16th session was held in Geneva from May 11 to July 24, 1964.

- 17th session, 1965

The 17th session was held in two parts: in Geneva from May 3 to July 9, 1965, and in Monaco from January 3 to 28, 1966.

- 18th session, 1966

The 18th session was held in Geneva from May 4 to July 19, 1966.

- 19th session, 1967

The 19th session was held in Geneva from May 8 to July 14, 1967.

- 20th session, 1968

The 20th session was held in Geneva from May 27 to August 2, 1968.

- 21st session, 1969

The 21st session was held in Geneva from June 2 to August 8, 1969.

=== 1970s sessions ===
- 22nd session, 1970

The 22nd session was held in Geneva from May 4 to July 10, 1970.

- 23rd session, 1971

The 23rd session was held in Geneva from April 26 to July 30, 1971.

- 24th session, 1972

The 24th session was held in Geneva from May 2 to July 7, 1972.

- 25th session, 1973

The 25th session was held in Geneva from May 7 to July 13, 1973.

- 26th session, 1974

The 26th session was held in Geneva from May 6 to July 26, 1974.

- 27th session, 1975

The 27th session was held in Geneva from May 5 to July 25, 1975.

- 28th session, 1976

The 28th session was held in Geneva from May 3 to July 23, 1976.

- 29th session, 1977

The 29th session was held in Geneva from May 3 to July 29, 1977.

- 30th session, 1978

The 30th session was held in Geneva from May 8 to July 28, 1978.

- 31st session, 1979

The 31st session was held in Geneva from May 14 to August 3, 1979.

=== 1980s sessions ===
- 32nd session, 1980

The 32nd session was held in Geneva from May 5 to July 25, 1980.

- 33rd session, 1981

The 33rd session was held in Geneva from May 4 to July 24, 1981.

- 34th session, 1982

The 34th session was held in Geneva from May 3 to July 23, 1982.

- 35th session, 1983

The 35th session was held in Geneva from May 3 to July 22, 1983.

- 36th session, 1984

The 36th session was held in Geneva from May 7 to July 27, 1984.

- 37th session, 1985

The 37th session was held in Geneva from May 6 to July 26, 1985.

- 38th session, 1986

The 38th session was held in Geneva from May 5 to July 11, 1986.

- 39th session, 1987

The 39th session was held in Geneva from May 4 to July 17, 1987.

- 40th session, 1988

The 40th session was held in Geneva from May 9 to July 29, 1988.

- 41st session, 1989

The 41st session was held from in Geneva from May 2 to July 21, 1989.

=== 1990s sessions ===
- 42nd session, 1990

The 42nd session was held in Geneva from May 1 to July 20, 1990.

- 43rd session, 1991

The 43rd session was held in Geneva from April 29 to July 19, 1991.

- 44th session, 1992

The 44th session was held in Geneva from May 4 to July 24, 1992.

- 45th session, 1993

The 45th session was held in Geneva from May 3 to July 23, 1993.

- 46th session, 1994

The 46th session was held in Geneva from May 2 to July 22, 1994.

- 47th session, 1995

The 47th session was held in Geneva from May 2 to July 21, 1995.

- 48th session, 1996

The 48th session was held in Geneva from May 6 to July 26, 1996.

- 49th session, 1997

The 49th session was held in Geneva from May 12 to July 18, 1997.

- 50th session, 1998

The 50th session was held in two parts: in Geneva from April 27 to June 12 and in New York from July 27 to August 14, 1998.

- 51st session, 1999

The 51st session was held in Geneva from May 3 to July 23, 1999.

=== 2000s sessions ===
- 52nd session, 2000

The 52nd session was held in Geneva in two parts from May 1 to June 9 and from July 10 to August 18, 2000.

- 53rd session, 2001

The 53rd session was held in Geneva in two parts from April 23 to June 1 and from July 2 to August 10, 2001.

- 54th session, 2002

The 54th session was held in Geneva in two parts from April 29 to June 7 and from July 22 to August 16, 2002.

- 55th session, 2003

The 55th session was held in Geneva in two parts from May 5 to June 6 and from July 7 to August 8, 2003.

- 56th session, 2004

The 56th session was held in Geneva in two parts from May 3 to June 4 and from July 5 to August 6, 2004.

- 57th session, 2005

The 57th session was held in Geneva in two parts from May 2 to June 3 and from July 11 to August 5, 2005.

- 58th session, 2006

The 58th session was held in Geneva in two parts from May 1 to June 9 and from July 3 to August 11, 2006.

- 59th session, 2007

The 59th session was held in Geneva in two parts from May 7 to June 8 and from July 9 to August 10, 2007.

- 60th session, 2008

The 60th session was held in Geneva in two parts from May 5 to June 6 and from July 7 to August 8, 2008.

- 61st session, 2009

The 61st session was held in Geneva in two parts from May 4 to June 5 and from July 6 to August 7, 2009.

=== 2010s sessions ===
- 62nd session, 2010

The 62nd session was held in Geneva in two parts from May 3 to June 4 and from July 5 to August 6, 2010.

- 63rd session, 2011

The 63rd session was held in Geneva in two parts from April 26 to June 3 and from July 4 to August 12, 2011.

- 64th session, 2012

The 64th session was held in Geneva in two parts from May 7 to June 1 and from July 2 to August 3, 2012.

- 65th session, 2013

The 65th session was held in Geneva in two parts from May 6 to June 7 and from July 8 to August 9, 2013.

- 66th session, 2014

The 66th session was held in Geneva in two parts from May 5 to June 6 and from July 7 to August 8, 2014.

- 67th session, 2015

The 67th session was held in Geneva in two parts from May 4 to June 5 and from July 6 to August 7, 2015.

- 68th session, 2016

The 68th session was held in Geneva in two parts from May 2 to June 10 and from July 4 to August 12, 2016.

- 69th session, 2017

The 69th session was held in Geneva in two parts from May 1 to June 2 and from July 3 to August 4, 2017.

- 70th session, 2018

The 70th session was held in Geneva in two parts from April 30 to June 1 and from July 2 to August 10, 2018.

- 71st session, 2019

The 71st session was held in Geneva in two parts from April 29 to June 7 and from July 8 to August 9, 2019.

=== 2020s sessions ===
- 72nd session, 2021

The 72nd session was originally scheduled to take place in 2020, but was postponed owing to the COVID-19 pandemic and was eventually held in Geneva in two parts from April 26 to June 4 and from July 5 to August 6, 2021.

- 73rd session, 2022

The 73rd session was held in Geneva in two parts from April 18 to June 3 and from July 4 to August 5, 2022.

- 74th session, 2023

The 74th session was held in Geneva in two parts from April 25 to June 2 and from July 3 to August 4, 2023.

- 75th session, 2024

The 75th session was held in Geneva in two parts from April 29 to May 31 and from July 1 to August 2, 2024.

- 76th session, 2025

The 76th session was held in Geneva from April 28 to May 30, 2025. It was shorter than usual, for reasons of budget.

- 77th session, 2026

The 77th session was held in Geneva in two parts from April 27 to June 5 and from June 29 to July 30, 2026.

- 78th session, 2027

The 78th session is scheduled to be held in Geneva in two parts from April 26 to June 11 and from July 5 to July 30, 2027.

== Achievements ==
The International Law Commission's work has led to the creation of a number of treaties and other works of international law that are key to the present international legal order, for example:

Sources of international law

- Vienna Convention on the Law of Treaties, 1969
- Vienna Convention on the Law of Treaties Between States and International Organizations or Between International Organizations, 1986
- Responsibility of States for Internationally Wrongful Acts, 2001

Law of international relations

- Vienna Convention on Diplomatic Relations, 1961
- Vienna Convention on Consular Relations, 1963
- Convention on Special Missions, 1969
- Protection of Diplomats Convention, 1973

Succession of states

- Vienna Convention on Succession of States in Respect of Treaties, 1978
- Vienna Convention on Succession of States in Respect of State Property, Archives and Debts, 1983

Law of international spaces

- Convention on the Territorial Sea and the Contiguous Zone, 1958
- Convention on the High Seas, 1958
- Convention on Fishing and Conservation of the Living Resources of the High Seas, 1958
- Convention on the Continental Shelf, 1958
- Convention on the Law of the Non-Navigational Uses of International Watercourses, 1997

Others

- Convention on the Reduction of Statelessness, 1961
- Rome Statute of the International Criminal Court, 1998
- United Nations Convention on Jurisdictional Immunities of States and Their Property, 2004

== Criticism ==
One of the problems regarding the work of the commission is the capability of governments to ignore its conclusions and refrain from accepting its recommendations when formulating conventions. At the 63rd meeting on July 7, 1950, chairman Georges Scelle complained that governments tended to ignore questions addressed to them by the commission out of lack of interest in its work.

One criticism sounded about the work of the commission is that the brevity of its annual sessions (10 to 12 weeks) does not allow thorough study of the problems under discussion. Already at the 3rd meeting of the commission, held on May 17, 1951, commission member Georges Scelle suggested the only way to fix the problem was by reforming the commission so that it would meet more often and whenever the Secretary General desired so.

Another criticism sounded already at the early history of the commission was made by Colombian delegate José María Yepes that the commission refrained from formulating principles on new issues and thus presents itself as incompetent.

== See also ==
- United Nations Office of Legal Affairs
- United Nations General Assembly Sixth Committee (Legal)
