= Treaty of Bromberg =

1657 alliance between Poland–Lithuania and Brandenburg

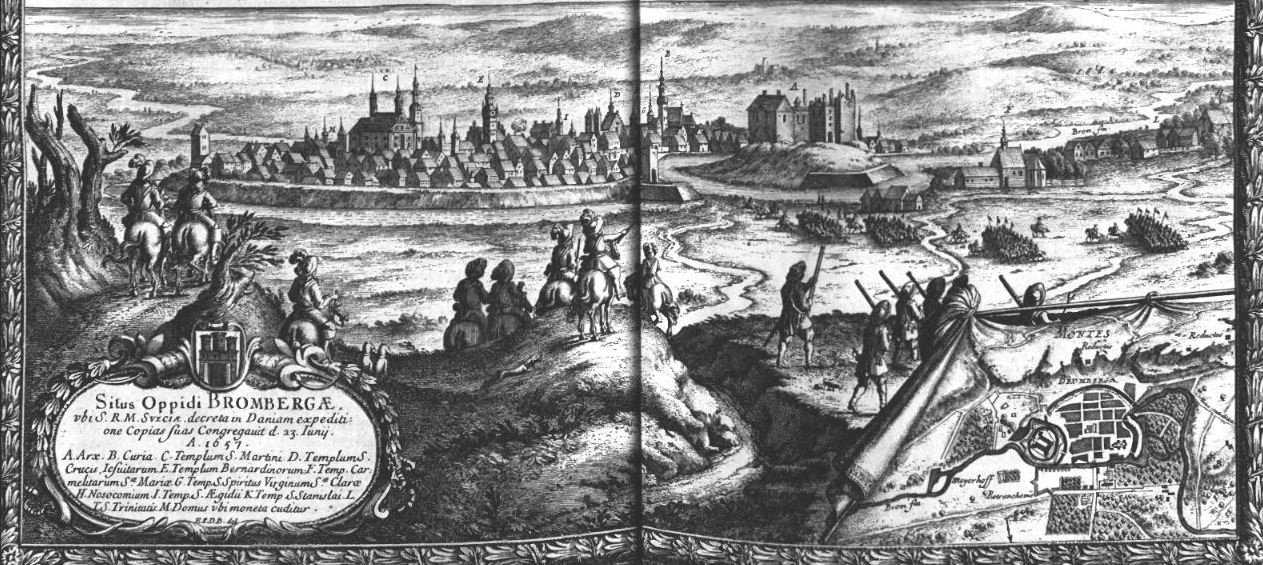
- Bromberg (Bydgoszcz) in 1657
- Type: Military alliance Legal status of the Duchy of Prussia, Lauenburg and Bütow Land, Draheim (Drahim) and Elbing (Elbląg)
- Signed: 6 November 1657
- Location: Bromberg (Bydgoszcz), Poland
- Expiration: 1773
- Signatories: John II Casimir Vasa; Frederick William I
- Parties: Poland–Lithuania; House of Hohenzollern
- Language: Latin

The Treaty of Bromberg (German: Vertrag von Bromberg, Latin: Pacta Bydgostensia) or Treaty of Bydgoszcz was a treaty between John II Casimir Vasa and Elector Frederick William of Brandenburg-Prussia that was ratified at Bromberg (Bydgoszcz) on 6 November 1657. The treaty had several agreements, including the Treaty of Wehlau, signed on 19 September 1657 by the Brandenburg–Prussian and Polish–Lithuanian envoys in Wehlau (Welawa, now Znamensk). Thus, the Treaty of Bromberg is sometimes referred to as treaty of Wehlau-Bromberg or Treaty of Wehlau and Bromberg (Polish: traktat welawsko-bydgoski).

In exchange for military aid in the Second Northern War and the return of Ermland (Ermeland, Warmia) to Poland, the Polish-Lithuanian monarch granted the Hohenzollern dynasty of Brandenburg hereditary sovereignty in the Duchy of Prussia, pawned Draheim (Drahim) and Elbing (Elbląg) to Brandenburg and handed over Lauenburg and Bütow Land to the Hohenzollerns as a hereditary fief.

The treaty was confirmed and internationally recognized in the Peace of Oliva in 1660. Elbing was kept by Poland, but Lauenburg and Bütow Land and Draheim were later integrated into Brandenburg-Prussia. The sovereignty in Prussia constituted the basis for the later coronation of the Hohenzollern as Prussian kings. Wehlau-Bromberg remained in effect until it was superseded by the Treaty of Warsaw (18 September 1773) after the First Partition of Poland. The Treaty of Bromberg later became regarded as one of the worst mistakes in Polish foreign policy towards Prussia after its consequences had become fatal to Poland.

== Context ==
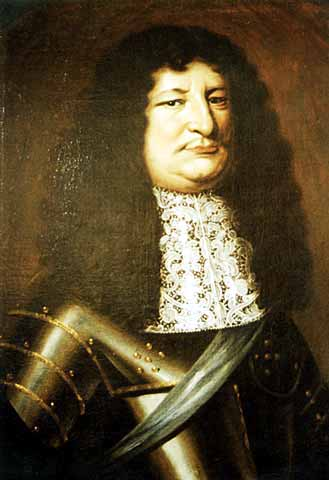
Frederick William I, Elector of Brandenburg and Duke of Prussia

The Duchy of Prussia was established as a Polish fief under duke Albrecht (Albert) in the Treaty of Cracow of 8 April 1525. The fief was hereditary, and if Albrecht or his brothers' house became extinct in the male line, the fief was to pass to the Polish king, who was to appoint a German-speaking Prussian-born governor. On 4 June 1563, that provision was changed by King of Poland and Grand Duke of Lithuania Sigismund II Augustus in a privilege issued at Petrikau, which, in addition to Albrecht's branch of the House of Hohenzollern (Hohenzollern-Ansbach), allowed the Brandenburg branch of the Hohenzollern as possible successors. The privilege provided for the succession of the Brandenburgian electors as Prussian dukes upon the extinction of the House of Hohenzollern-Ansbach in 1618.

In 1656, during the early Second Northern War, the Brandenburgian Hohenzollern took the Prussian duchy and Ermland (Ermeland, Warmia) as Swedish fiefs in the Treaty of Königsberg, before the Swedish king released them from the vassalage and made them absolute sovereigns in those provinces. After fighting along with the Swedish Army in 1656, most prominently at the Battle of Warsaw, Hohenzollern Frederick William I was willing to abandon his ally when the war had turned against them and signalled his willingness to change sides if Polish King and Lithuanian Garnd Duke John II Casimir Vasa would grant him similar privileges as previously Swedish King Charles X Gustav, conditions that were negotiated in Wehlau (Welawa, now Znamensk) and Bromberg (Bygost, Bydgoszcz).

The Polish interest in an alliance with Brandenburg-Prussia was born out of the need to end the war against Sweden as soon as possible. On 3 November 1656, the Truce of Vilna had promised Alexis of Russia's election as a successor on the Polish throne at the next diet in return for halting his offensive in Poland–Lithuania and to fight Sweden instead. In the Grand Duchy of Lithuania, there was support for the treaty from the nobles, who hoped for positions with more privilege, but that was not true for the Kingdom of Poland, where the elites looked for ways to circumvent Alexis's succession. For a fast end to the war against Sweden to be able to avoid the implementation of the Truce of Vilnius, the anti-Swedish alliance had to be extended.

The newly won Russian ally was reluctant to support Poland against Sweden as long as no diet had confirmed the truce. A second ally, the Austrian Habsburgs, were won in the first and the second Vienna Treaties, but the Habsburg forces were to be maintained by Poland, the prize for the alliance was bound to rise while the war lasted. A third ally was Denmark-Norway, which joined the anti-Swedish coalition in June 1657 after it had been triggered by the second Treaty of Vienna. However, Denmark was not fighting on Polish soil, and although its involvement tied down Charles X Gustav's forces and a formal alliance with Poland was concluded in July, the Danish aimed to recover Scandinavian territories, which had been lost at the Second Treaty of Brömsebro (1645).

The Habsburgs' interest in the treaty was to build up good relations with Frederick William I. As a prince-elector, he was a valuable ally if he supported their policy in the Holy Roman Empire. Thus, the Habsburgs were interested in Frederick William I changing sides and sent diplomat Franz Paul Freiherr von Lisola to mediate a respective settlement.

Bromberg and Wehlau are regarded as "twin treaties", "supplementary treaties" or one treaty, which is sometimes referred to as "Treaty of Wehlau and Bromberg" or "Treaty of Wehlau-Bromberg."

== Ratification ==
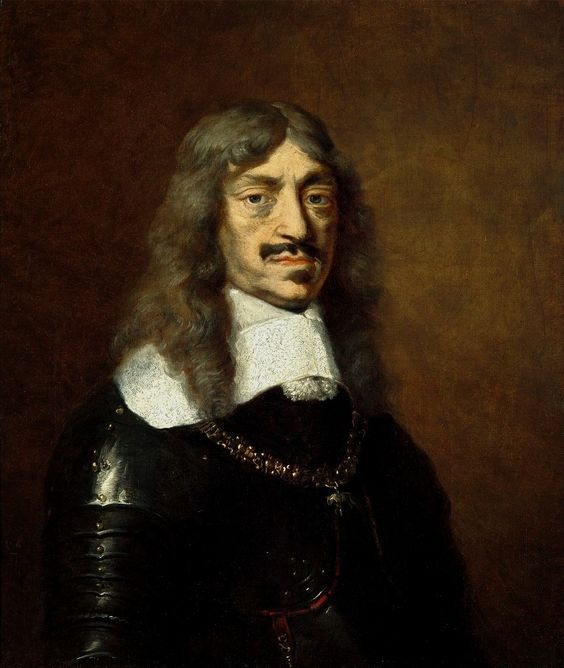
King John II Casimir of Poland

The preliminary treaty of Wehlau had been signed on 19 September 1657 by Frederick William I's envoys von Schwerin and von Somnitz, as well as by Warmian (Ermland) prince-bishop Wacław Leszczyński and Wincenty Korwin Gosiewski for the Polish–Lithuanian Commonwealth, and Habsburg delegate and mediator Freiherr Franz von Lisola. (Note: Signatories at Wehlau (per Annotated edition, IEG Mainz, retrieved 2010-02-22): Venceslaus de Leszno, episcopus Varmien[sis] s[acrae] r[egiae] m[ajesta]tis Poloniae et Sueciae plenipotentiarius; Vincentius Corvinus Gosiewski, supremus thesaurarius et campiductor m[agni] d[ucatus] L[ithuaniae] s[acrae] r[egiae] m[ajestatis] Poloniae et Sueciae plenipotentiarius; F[ranciscus] De Lisola, seren[issimi] m[ajestatis] Hungariae et Bohemiae regis ad hosce tractatum pro mediatione ablegatus, eiusdemque consiliarius; Ottho Liber Baro a Schwerin, plenipotentiarius electoralis; Laurentius Christophorus Somnitz, Plenipotentiarius electoralis)

The amended and final version of the treaty was ratified on 6 November by Frederick William I and John II Casimir in Bromberg (Bydgoszcz). (Note: The signatories at Bromberg also included Mikołaj Prazmowski and Kazimierz Samuel Kuszewicz. Annotated edition, IEG Mainz.) The Brandenburgian elector and the Polish king attended the ceremony with their wives, Luise Henriette of Nassau and Marie Louise Gonzaga, respectively. Danzig (Gdansk) Mayor Adrian von der Linde was also present.

The Treaties of Wehlau and Bromberg were confirmed by the parties and internationally recognized at the Peace of Oliva, which ended the Second Northern War in 1660, and by the Polish Sejm in 1659 and 1661.

== Agreements ==
The treaty ratified in Bromberg had three parts. The first one contained 22 articles and dealt primarily with the status and succession of Prussia, the Brandenburg-Polish alliance, and military aid. It was drafted in Wehlau and signed there by the Brandenburgian and Polish plenipotentiaries and the Habsburg mediator. The second part was a special convention ("Specialis Convention") containing 6 articles, also drafted and signed by the plenipotentiaries and the mediator in Wehlau, which further detailed the alliance and military aid. The third part amended the Wehlau agreement and primarily detailed Polish concessions.

=== Status of Prussia ===
The Duchy of Prussia—where Frederick William I had become fully sovereign by the Brandenburg-Swedish Treaty of Labiau—was likewise accepted by the Polish–Lithuanian Commonwealth to be the sovereign possession of the House of Hohenzollern.

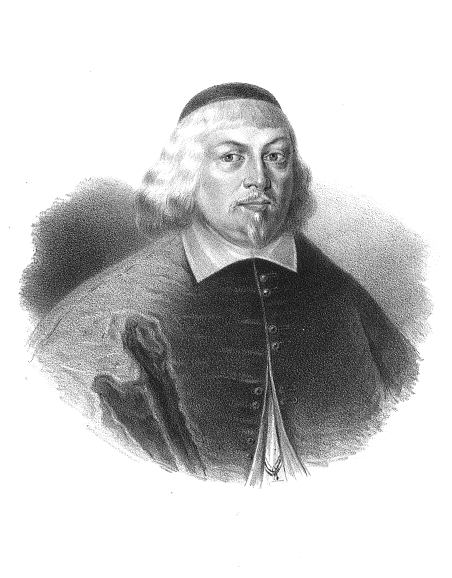
Wacław Leszczyński (Venceslaus Les(z)no), archbishop of Ermland (Warmia)

However, Ermland (Ermeland, Warmia) was to be returned to Poland. And if the Brandenburgian Hohenzollern dynasty became extinct in the male line, the Prussian duchy was agreed to pass on to the Polish crown. That made Prussian estates have to pay conditional allegiance to an envoy of subsequent Polish kings upon their succession (hommagium eventuale, Eventualhuldigung), and they were released from previous oaths and obligations regarding the Polish crown.

The Roman Catholic Church in the former Duchy of Prussia was to remain subordinate to the archbishop of Ermland (Warmia), retain its possessions and income and be granted religious freedom.

=== Military aid ===
Brandenburg-Prussia was obliged to give military aid to Polish–Lithuanian Commonwealth against the Swedish Empire during the ongoing Second Northern War. Frederick William I had in Wehlau agreed to aid John II Casimir Vasa with 8,000 men, and both parties agreed on an "eternal alliance". In Bromberg, it was agreed that from his Prussian province, Frederick William I would dispatch 1,500 foot and 500 horse to join the army of the Polish-Lithuanian monarch.

=== Financial and territorial agreements ===
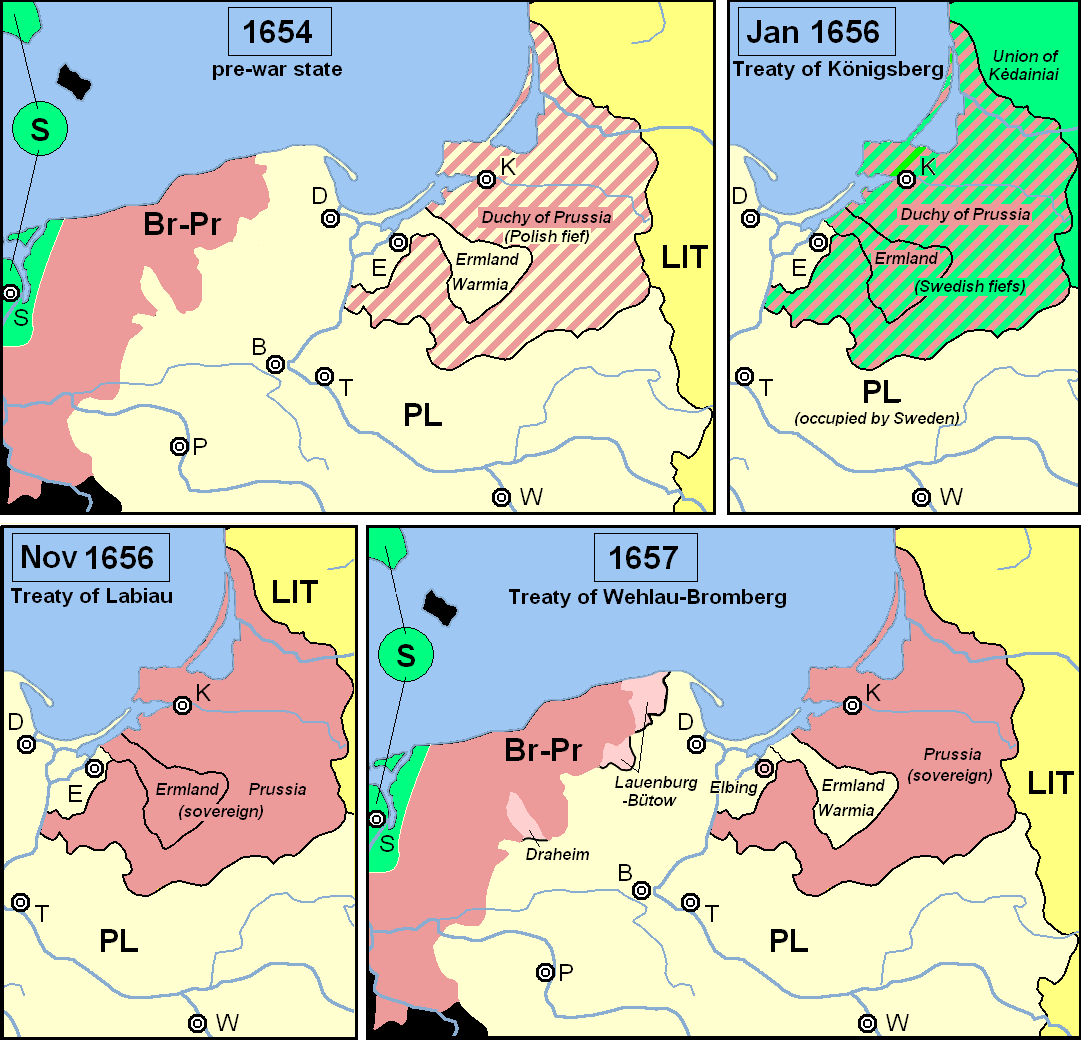
Territorial changes following the Treaty of Wehlau-Bromberg, compared to the pre-war situation (1654) and the treaties of Königsberg (January 1656) and Labiau (November 1656).

In return, the Polish crown granted Brandenburg-Prussia Lauenburg and Bütow Land as a hereditary fief. It was to be held under the same conditions as previously granted to the House of Pomerania, free of duties except that the House of Hohenzollern had sent envoys to the coronations of successive Polish-Lithuanian monarchs, who were then to receive a written confirmation of the fief. If the Hohenzollern dynasty had no male heir, the fief should return to the Polish crown.

In addition to Lauenburg and Bütow land, Brandenburg-Prussia was to receive the town of Elbing (Elbląg). In an amendment, Brandenburg-Prussia was obliged to return the town to Poland once the latter had bailed it out with 400,000 thalers. (Note: The sum given for the Elbing ransom by historian Robert I. Frost is 40,000 thalers in Frost (2004), p. 104, and 400,000 thalers in Frost (2000), p. 200. It is 300,000 thalers in Oakley (1992), p. 103 and Wilson (1998), p. 135. Kamińska (1983), p. 12 gives 400,000 thalers. The commented edition of the treaty at the Institut für Europäische Geschichte (Institute for European History) in Mainz gives 400,000 reichstalers in the second amendment, overruling Article XII of the Wehlau tractates. Instead of providing 500 horse, Brandenburg-Prussia was to return Elbing and level its fortification upon receiving the payment. Sources given there are: AGADWarschau MK KK Volume 202, p. 40, print: Dogiel IV, p. 497; Pufendorf, p. 389; Dumont VI/2, p. 196; Dolezel, p. 208)

The third Polish concession was the payment of 120,000 thalers to Brandenburg-Prussia for war-related damage suffered upon entering the war by Poland. As a security for this payment, the district of Draheim was to be handed over to Brandenburg for three years. The district comprised the town of Tempelburg (now Czaplinek) and 18 villages at the border of Brandenburgian Pomerania. The sum was to be paid in annual rates of 40,000 thalers, and Brandenburg was to keep Draheim if the money had not been paid by the end of the third year.

For the Catholics in Draheim, religious freedom was guaranteed. The Hohenzollern also agreed to grant religious freedom to the Catholic Church in Lauenburg and Bütow Land. The Catholic communities were to stay subordinate to and to be represented by the Kuyavian bishop and keep all of their income, and the Electors of Brandenburg and the local nobility were to have patronage over the churches.

The rights of the nobility of Lauenburg and Bütow Land were to be left unchanged, and previous court sentences and privileges were to remain in force. The administration of the region should be conducted just as it had been handled by the Pomeranian dukes. In a note issued separately from the treaty, John II Casimir assured the nobles that Poland would continue to treat them as members of the Polish–Lithuanian Commonwealth and so the nobles would enjoy the same rights and opportunities as the Polish nobles if they decided to leave for Poland.

== Implementation ==
=== Prussia ===
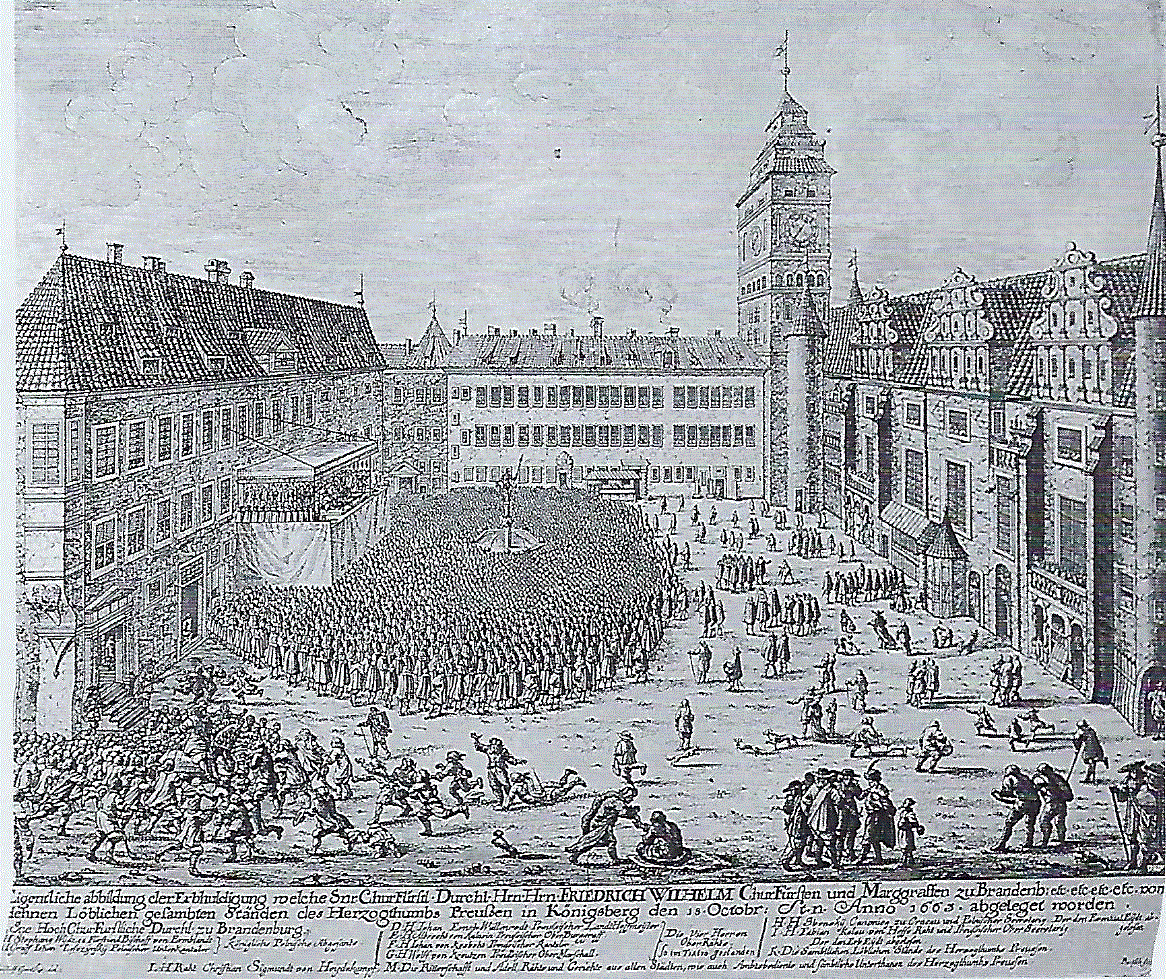
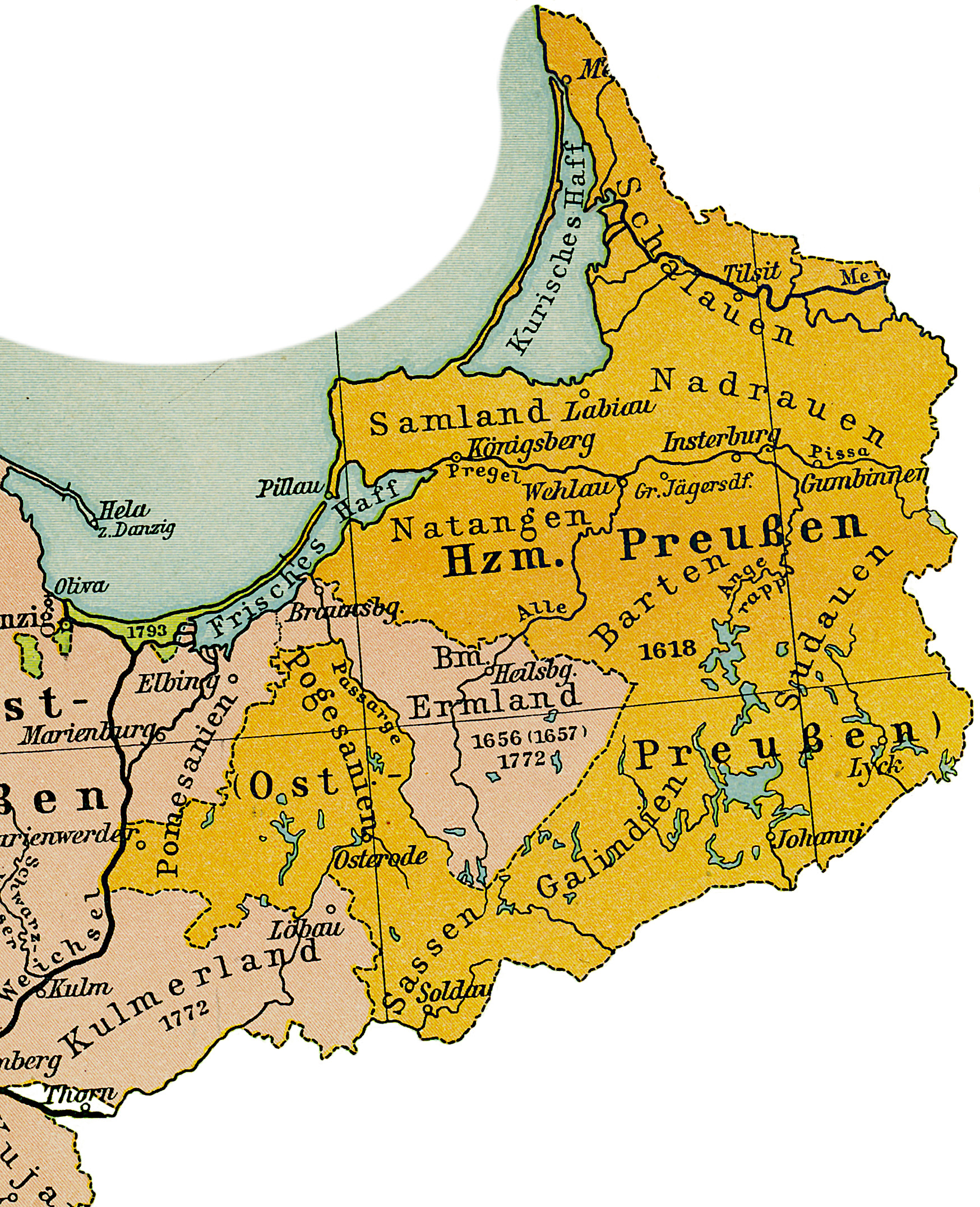
Image: The Prussian estates paying homage to Frederick William I in Königsberg Castle, 1663. Map: East Prussian regions, dates indicate the year of acquisition by the House of Hohenzollern.

The treaty first met with the protest of the Prussian estates, which feared a loss of privileges. As a leader of the opposition, Königsberg mayor Hieronymus Roth was incarcerated for 16 years until his death. The estates' protests ended in 1663, when they swore allegiance to Frederick William I. The ecclesiastical subordination of the Roman Catholic Church to the Polish Royal Prussian prince-bishop of Ermland (Warmia) also caused tensions with the House of Hohenzollern. Despite those problems, sovereignty in the Prussian duchy provided the basis for the Brandenburgian Hohenzollern to crown themselves "King in Prussia" in 1701.

=== Lauenburg and Bütow Land ===
Lauenburg and Bütow Land was officially handed over by John II Casimir's envoy Ignatz Bokowski and received by the Brandenburg-Prussian envoys Adam von Podewils and Ulrich Gottfried von Somnitz in April 1658. During the ceremony, the non-noble inhabitants swore the same oath of allegiance to the Brandenburgian electors that had been sworn to the Pomeranian dukes, and the nobles swore a modified oath. The oath was given by 63 noble families from the Lauenburg district and 43 families of the Bütow district, which was represented at the ceremony by 220 persons. Three persons swore in Polish. The Brandenburg-Prussian administration did not accept all of the families as nobles since in May, only thirteen indigenous and six immigrated Pomeranian families in the Lauenburg district and four families in the Bütow district were listed as nobles, the others being referred to as besondere freye Leute ("special free persons").

The Brandenburgian electors amended their title with dominus de Lauenburg et Bytaw, despite Polish protests aimed at a change from dominus (lord) to fiduciarus (fiduciary). Until 1771, Lauenburg and Bütow Land was administered from Lauenburg (now Lębork), where the local Oberhauptmann had his seat; the nobles swore allegiance to the electors; and assemblies of the nobles were held in a landtag, the Seymik. After 1771, the region was governed from Stettin (now Szczecin), like the rest of Brandenburgian Pomerania, and allegiance to subsequent Prussian kings was given with the other Pomeranian estates in Stettin.

The provision that Brandenburgian envoys were to be sent to the inauguration of subsequent Polish kings was followed until 1698, when Brandenburg-Prussia ceased to send delegations. The Treaty of Bromberg was superseded by the Treaty of Warsaw (1773), which followed the First Partition of Poland in 1772. In the new treaty, the terms of Bromberg were cancelled, including the guarantees for the Catholic Church and the nobles, and the Polish crown renounced all rights on Lauenburg and Bütow Land, which was accordingly no longer a fief and would no longer be inherited by the Polish king if the Hohenzollern line became extinct.

=== Elbing/Elbląg ===
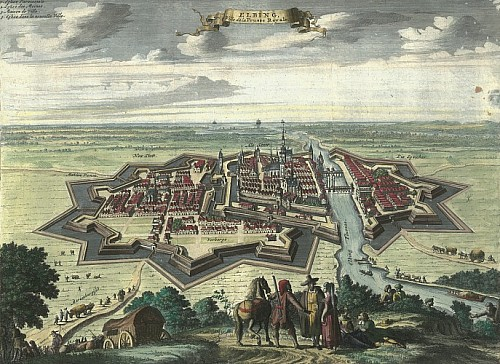
Elbing (Elbląg)

In 1660, the Swedish garrison withdrew from Elbing (Elbląg), but the Polish–Lithuanian Commonwealth seized it although it had not paid the sum that had been agreed on in Bromberg. That made Frederick William I not support Poland in the contemporary Russo-Polish War, but he yielded the neutrality agreement that he had concluded with Russia in 1656. Poland would keep the town until the First Partition of Poland in 1772, with short interruptions in 1698/1699 and 1703. In 1698, Polish King Augustus II the Strong permitted Prussian troops to besiege and storm Elbing, but the Prussian troops withdrew the following year when Russia mediated its exchange for the Polish Crown Jewels as a security for the bills receivable. When Augustus the Strong failed to pay, the town was reoccupied in 1703, during the Great Northern War, but the Prussians again withdrew shortly afterwards because of Swedish pressure.

=== Draheim ===
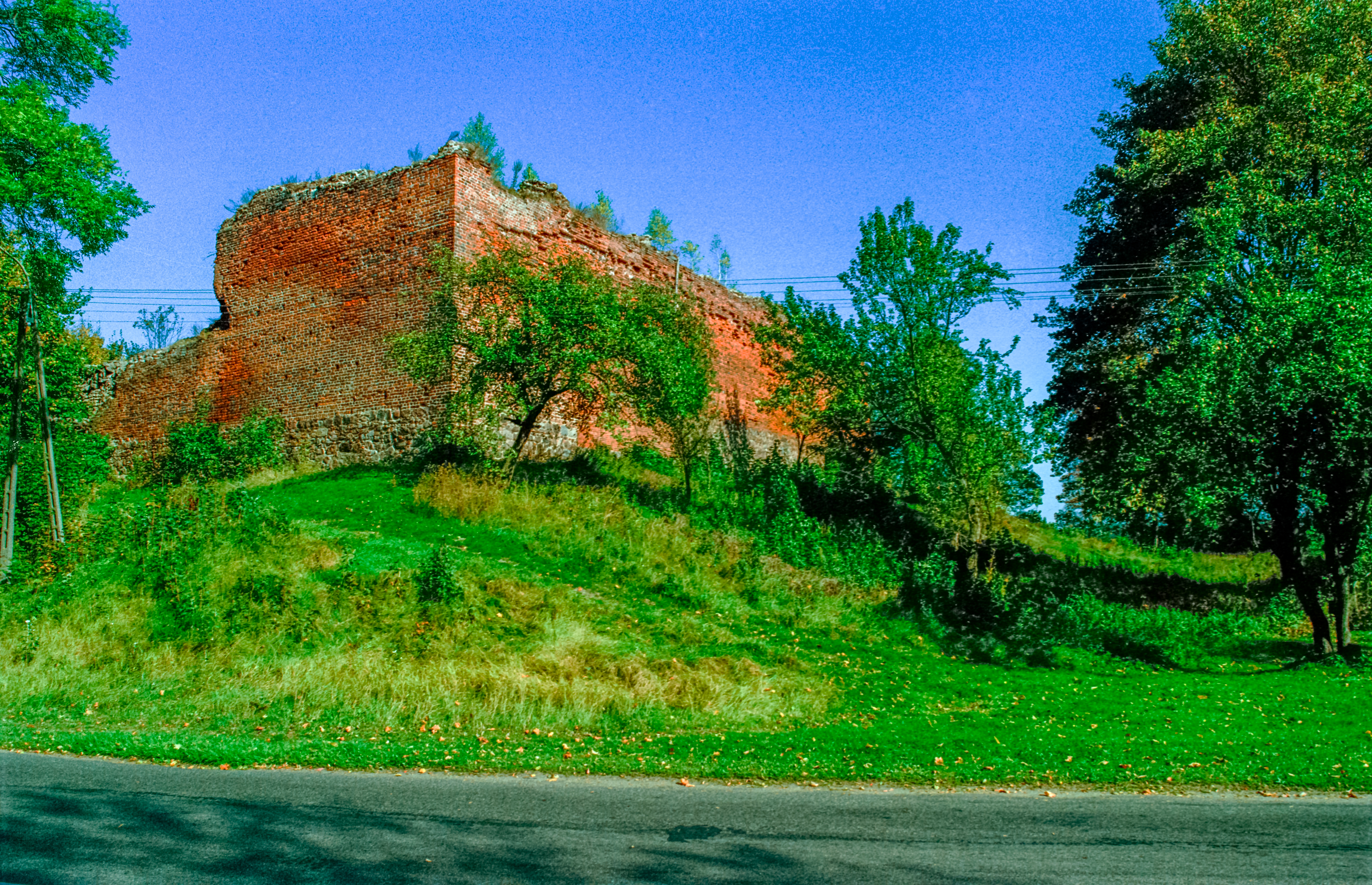
Ruins of Draheim castle

In addition to Elbing, Poland aimed at also keeping Draheim, but Frederick William I was able to thwart those plans by occupying it in 1663. In the 1720s, the government of the Brandenburgian province of Pomerania took over administrative tasks regarding Draheim, but it retained its independence from the Pomeranian province until the terms of the Treaty of Bromberg were superseded by the Treaty of Warsaw (1773). Before the 1773 treaty, Poland had the nominal right to bail out Draheim, which was never pursued. Nevertheless, the Polish crown underlined that right by granting privileges to the local Schulze until 1680. In Article V of the Warsaw Treaty, Poland renounced its right to buy Draheim back and ceded it to Prussia "for eternal times".

== Assessments ==
According to Robert I. Frost the House of Hohenzollern, Wehlau-Bromberg was a "major geopolitical gain and surge in wealth and prestige", and Poland had "substantially benefited" from Brandenburgian support during the war. The concessions that Poland made in Wehlau and Bromberg were thought as tactical and open to later reversal, which did not happen because of Poland's internal weakness. Christopher M. Clark says that John Casimir of Poland was "eager to separate Brandenburg from Sweden and to neutralize it as a military threat" when Poland–Lithuania was threatened by the Tsardom of Russia and ready to accept the Hohenzollerns' demands because of pressure by the House of Habsburg, which, after the emperor's incidental death earlier that year, needed to secure the elector's vote since its "urgings [...] carried considerable weight since the Poles were counting on Austrian assistance in the event of a renewed Swedish or Russian attack". Clark thus views Frederick William as a "beneficiary of international developments beyond his control" and verifies his thesis by the post-Bromberg developments in which the elector lost all further war gains because of French intervention at the Treaty of Oliva.

Józef Włodarski regards the treaty as one of the greatest mistakes in Polish foreign policy towards Prussia with fatal consequences for Poland. According to Anna Kamińska, the treaty marked the end of Polish influence on the Baltic and the decline of Poland–Lithuania's position in Europe. Frost says that the treaty was subject to criticism of historians such as Kazimierz Piwarski, who considered that the price paid by Poland in Bromberg was unnecessarily high. According to Frost, these critics argue from a view after the partitions of Poland and neglect the complexity of the contemporary situation: "Contemporary [Polish] politicians were aware of the dangers of conceding sovereignty, which they accepted not because they were stupid, indifferent, or lacking in foresight, but because the alternatives seemed more damaging to the Commonwealth's interests". Frost regards as having merit Piwarski's assertion of the Polish decision to have been heavily influenced by the Habsburgs but also states that the Polish interest in a rapprochement with Brandenburg had emerged before 1656, long before Lisola entered the scene.

== See also ==
- Polish-Lithuanian and Prussian Alliance of 1790
- List of treaties

== Sources ==
=== Bibliography ===
- Bahlcke, Joachim (2008). Glaubensflüchtlinge. Ursachen, Formen und Auswirkungen frühneuzeitlicher Konfessionsmigration in Europa. Religions- und Kulturgeschichte in Ostmittel- und Südosteuropa (in German). Vol. 4. Berlin-Hamburg-Münster: LIT Verlag. ISBN 978-3-8258-6668-6.
- Biereigel, Hans (2005). Luise Henriette von Nassau-Oranien. Kurfürstin von Brandenburg (in German). Sutton. ISBN 3-89702-838-7.
- Clark, Christopher M. (2006). Iron Kingdom: The Rise And Downfall of Prussia, 1600-1947. Harvard U press. ISBN 0674023854.
- Friedrich, Karin (2006). The Other Prussia. Royal Prussia, Poland and Liberty, 1569-1772. Cambridge Studies in Early Modern History. Cambridge University Press. ISBN 0-521-02775-6.
- Frost, Robert I (2000). The Northern Wars. War, State and Society in Northeastern Europe 1558-1721. Harlow: Longman. ISBN 978-0-582-06429-4.
- Frost, Robert I. (2004). After the Deluge. Poland-Lithuania and the Second Northern War, 1655-1660. Cambridge Studies in Early Modern History. Cambridge University Press. ISBN 0-521-54402-5.
- Holborn, Hajo (1982). A History of Modern Germany: 1648-1840. A History of Modern Germany. Vol. 2. Princeton University Press. ISBN 0-691-00796-9.
- Jähnig, Bernhart (2006). "Die politischen und rechtlichen Außenbeziehungen des Herzogtums Preußen (1525-1660)". In Willoweit, Dietmar; Lemberg, Hans (eds.). Reiche und Territorien in Ostmitteleuropa. Historische Beziehungen und politische Herrschaftslegitimation. Völker, Staaten und Kulturen in Ostmitteleuropa (in German). Vol. 2. Munich: Oldenbourg Wissenschaftsverlag. pp. 51–72. ISBN 3-486-57839-1.
- Kamińska, Anna (1983). Brandenburg-Prussia and Poland. A study in diplomatic history (1669-1672). Marburger Ostforschungen. Vol. 41. J.G. Herder-Institut. ISBN 3-87969-174-6.
- Makiłła, Dariusz: Traktat welawski z 19 IX 1657 r. - dzieło pomyłki czy zdrady? Uwagi na tle historii dyplomacji polskiej w czasach drugiej wojny północnej (1654-1667).
- Małłek, Janusz (2006). "Das Herzogtum Preußen und das Königreich Polen (1525-1657). Rechtliche und politische Beziehungen zwischen beiden Ländern". In Willoweit, Dietmar; Lemberg, Hans (eds.). Reiche und Territorien in Ostmitteleuropa. Historische Beziehungen und politische Herrschaftslegitimation. Völker, Staaten und Kulturen in Ostmitteleuropa (in German). Vol. 2. Munich: Oldenbourg Wissenschaftsverlag. pp. 73–80. ISBN 3-486-57839-1.
- Materna, Ingo; Ribbe, Wolfgang; Adamy, Kurt (1995). Brandenburgische Geschichte (in German). Akademie Verlag. ISBN 3-05-002508-5.
- Motsch, Christoph (2001). Grenzgesellschaft und frühmoderner Staat. Veröffentlichungen des Max-Planck-Instituts für Geschichte (in German). Vol. 164. Vandenhoeck & Ruprecht. ISBN 3-525-35634-X.
- Muszyńska, J.; Wijaczki J.(red.) - Rzeczpospolita w latach Potopu 4. J. Wijaczka: Traktat welawsko-bydgoski - próba oceny.
- Nolan, Cathal J. (2008). Wars of the Age of Louis XIV, 1650-1715. An encyclopedia of global warfare and civilization. Greenwood encyclopedias of modern world wars. ABC-CLIO. ISBN 978-0-313-33046-9.
- Oakley, Stewart Philip (1992). War and Peace in the Baltic, 1560-1790. War in Context. Abingdon-New York: Routledge. ISBN 0-415-02472-2.
- Schmidt, Roderich (2006). "Die Lande Lauenburg und Bütow in ihrer wechselnden Zugehörigkeit zum Deutschen Orden, zu Pommern und Polen und zu Brandenburg-Preußen". In Willoweit, Dietmar; Lemberg, Hans (eds.). Reiche und Territorien in Ostmitteleuropa. Historische Beziehungen und politische Herrschaftslegitimation. Völker, Staaten und Kulturen in Ostmitteleuropa (in German). Vol. 2. Munich: Oldenbourg Wissenschaftsverlag. pp. 93–106. ISBN 3-486-57839-1.
- van Stekelenburg, Dick (1988). Michael Albinus "Dantiscanus" (1610 - 1653). Amsterdamer Publikationen zur Sprache und Literatur (in German). Vol. 74. Rodopi. ISBN 90-6203-770-4.
- Stone, Daniel (2001). The Polish-Lithuanian State, 1386-1795. History of East Central Europe. Vol. 4. University of Washington Press. ISBN 0-295-98093-1.
- Vierhaus, Rudolf (1984). Deutschland im Zeitalter des Absolutismus (1648-1763). Deutsche Geschichte (in German). Vol. 6 (2 ed.). Vandenhoeck & Ruprecht. ISBN 3-525-33504-0.
- Wilson, Peter Hamish (1998). German Armies: War and German Politics, 1648-1806. Warfare and history. Routledge. ISBN 1-85728-106-3.
- Włodarski, Józef (1993). Miasta warmińskie w latach 1655-1663. Szkoła Pedagogiczna w Olsztynie.
