= International Commission on Civil Status =

Intergovernmental organization

- Member states Represented by international associations Observer states
- Abbreviation: ICCS, CIEC
- Formation: September 1948 (provisional); December 1949 (official)
- Type: Intergovernmental organization
- Purpose: Promote international cooperation in civil status matters and improve the functioning of national civil status services
- Headquarters: Secretariat General
- Location: Strasbourg, France
- Members: 7 members (5 member states and 2 international associations); 8 observer states
- Official language: French
- President: Michel Montini
- Secretary General: Nicolas Nord
- Main organ: General Assembly
- Website: ciec1.org

The International Commission on Civil Status, or ICCS (French: Commission internationale de l'état civil, or CIEC), is an intergovernmental organisation whose aim is to promote international cooperation in civil status matters and to improve the functioning of national civil status services. It was provisionally founded in September 1948 in Amsterdam, Netherlands, and officially recognised by an exchange of letters in December 1949 and two protocols in 1950 and 1952. The organisation is seated in Strasbourg, France, and its official language is French.

== Purpose ==
Founded after World War II in the context of millions of refugees, missing and displaced people, the organisation's aim was to facilitate the cooperation between states in establishing, recognising and validating civil status documents, also known as vital records, such as birth, marriage and death certificates. It did so by drafting international treaties such as the Convention on the issue of multilingual extracts from civil status records, which provides standard multilingual formats of vital records, allowing their international acceptance without the need for translation or legalisation. Later conventions drafted by the ICCS include the Convention on the recognition of decisions recording a sex reassignment.

== Members ==
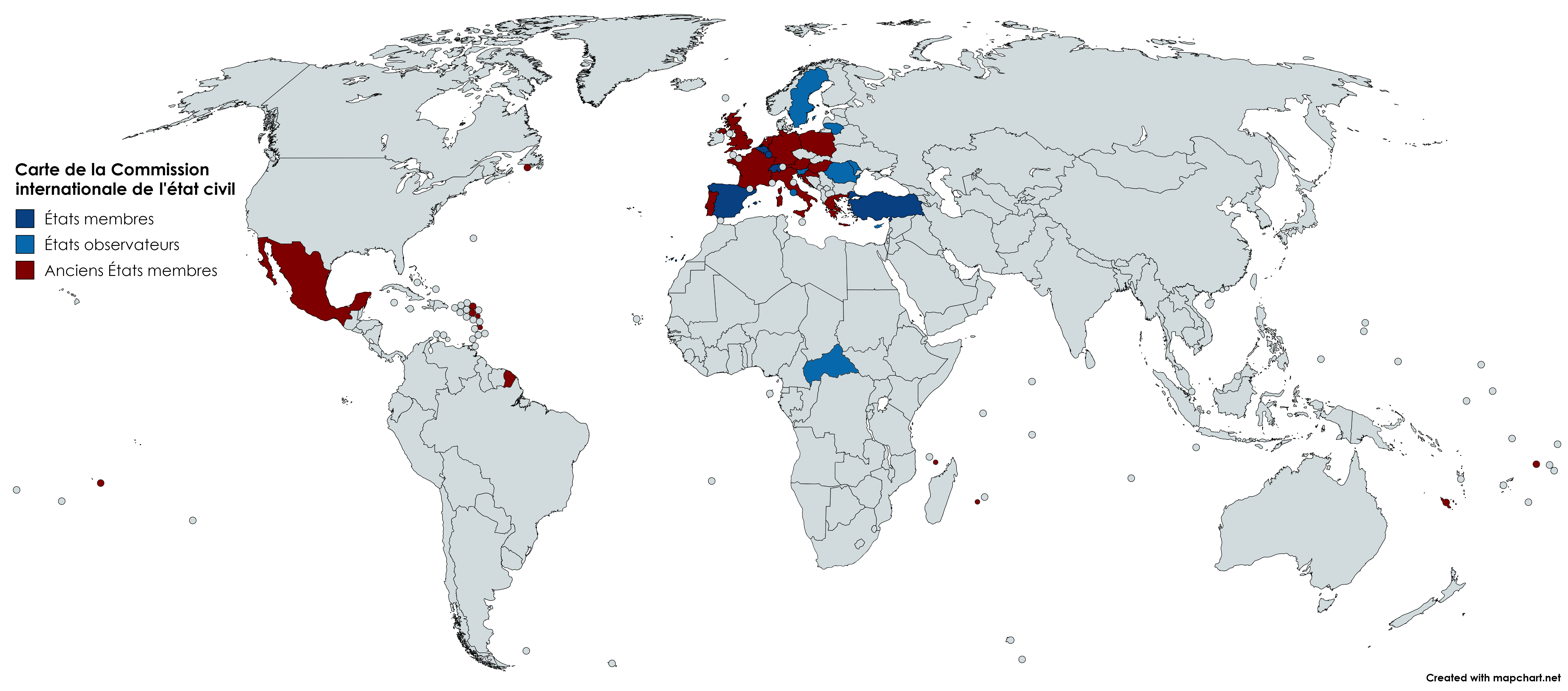
Current and former member states and observer states of the ICCS

The ICCS was created by five founding member states in 1948. In 1952, a protocol opened the organisation to accession by any state. By 1999, 11 more states had acceded to the ICCS, reaching a peak of 16 member states. After 2007, only one more state acceded and 12 states left the organisation, resulting in only five member states by 2022.

In 2024, the Francophone Notary Association, representing 30 states, (Note: Belgium, Benin, Bulgaria, Burkina Faso, Cameroon, Central African Republic, Chad, Comoros, Democratic Republic of the Congo, France, Gabon, Guinea, Ivory Coast, Lebanon, Luxembourg, Madagascar, Mali, Mauritius, Morocco, New Caledonia, Niger, North Macedonia, Poland, Quebec, Republic of the Congo, Romania, Senegal, Switzerland, Togo, Tunisia.) joined the organisation as a non-state member. In 2026, the European Association of Registrars, representing nine states, (Note: Belgium, Estonia, Germany, Italy, Latvia, Netherlands, Poland, Slovakia, Slovenia.) also joined.

Member state	Ratification	Start of membership	Renunciation	End of membership
Austria	14 September 1961	14 October 1961	8 October 2007	8 April 2008
Belgium	25 September 1950	1 October 1950	–	–
Croatia	25 March 1999	24 April 1999	21 July 2014	21 January 2015
France	25 September 1950	1 October 1950	17 May 2019	17 November 2019
Germany	27 September 1956	27 October 1956	31 December 2014	30 June 2015
Greece	3 September 1959	3 October 1959	30 June 2021	30 December 2021
Hungary	15 September 1999	15 October 1999	6 June 2012	6 December 2012
Italy	4 September 1958	4 October 1958	2 April 2014	2 October 2014
Luxembourg	25 September 1950	1 October 1950	–	–
Mexico	15 September 2010	15 October 2010	15 June 2017	15 December 2017
Netherlands	25 September 1950	1 October 1950	15 November 2017	15 May 2018
Poland	9 September 1998	9 October 1998	14 June 2017	14 December 2017
Portugal	13 September 1973	13 October 1973	10 July 2014	10 January 2015
Spain	13 September 1974	13 October 1974	–	–
Switzerland	25 September 1950	1 October 1950	–	–
Turkey	24 September 1953	23 December 1953	–	–
United Kingdom	11 September 1996	11 October 1996	22 August 2013	22 February 2014

Several states are observers of the organisation:

- Central African Republic (from 4 November 2025)
- Cyprus (from 24 March 1999)
- Holy See (lifetime)
- Lithuania (from 23 March 1994)
- Moldova (from 28 March 2006)
- Romania (from 9 September 2008)
- Slovenia (from 27 March 1996)
- Sweden (lifetime)

== See also ==
- European institutions in Strasbourg
