= Congress of Vienna (disambiguation) =

Congress of Vienna can refer to:

- First Congress of Vienna, was held in 1515, attended by the Holy Roman Emperor, Maximilian I, and the Jagiellonian brothers, Sigismund I, King of Poland and Grand Duke of Lithuania, and Vladislaus II, King of Hungary and King of Bohemia. It was a turning point in the history of central Europe, ultimately increasing the power of the Habsburgs and diminishing that of the Jagiellonians.
- Congress of Vienna was a conference of ambassadors of the major powers of Europe, held from 1 November 1814 to 8 June 1815, to settle issues and redraw the continent's political map after the defeat of Napoleonic France the previous spring

See also

- Vienna Conference (disambiguation)
- Vienna Convention (disambiguation)
- Treaty of Vienna (disambiguation)
