= Treaty of Vienna =

Treaty of Vienna may refer to:

- Treaty of Vienna (1261) during the War of the Babenberg Succession
- Treaty of Vienna (1606), Holy Roman Empire/Hungary
- Treaty of Vienna (1656), Austro-Polish alliance in the Second Northern War, ineffective
- Treaty of Vienna (1657), Austro-Polish alliance in the Second Northern War, effective
- Treaty of Vienna (1719), the Great Northern War
- Treaty of Vienna (1725), Austria/Spain
- Treaty of Vienna (1731), Britain/Austria - alliance
- Treaty of Vienna (1738), resolved the War of Polish succession
- Treaty of Schönbrunn, also called the Treaty of Vienna (1809), France/Austria - following Austria's defeat during the Napoleonic Wars
- Treaty of Vienna (1815), can refer to several different treaties notably
  - Secret Treaty of Vienna, defensive pact signed 3 January 1815 between Britain, France and Austria
  - Treaty of Vienna of 25 March 1815, (also known as "Treaty of General Alliance"), when Austria, Britain, Prussia and Russia agreed to put 150,000 men in the field against Napoleon Bonaparte.(see wikisource:Declaration at the Congress of Vienna), .
  - Treaty of Vienna of 9 June 1815, (also known as the "Final Act of the Congress of Vienna"), embodying all the separate treaties agreed at the Congress by the European powers.
- Treaty of Vienna (1864), Austria/Prussia/Denmark - concluded the Second Schleswig War
- Treaty of Vienna (1866), Austria/France/Italy
- Treaty of Vienna (1878), Austria/Prussia/Denmark
- Treaty of Peace between Austria-Hungary and Finland (Vienna Peace Treaty, 1918), Austria-Hungary/Finland
- Treaty of Vienna (1955), re-established the state of Austria after the Second World War
- Joint Comprehensive Plan of Action, the final agreement on the 2015 Iran nuclear deal framework, signed in Vienna

== See also ==
- Vienna Agreement
- Vienna Award (disambiguation), two agreements before and during World War II that expanded the territory of Hungary
- Vienna Conference (disambiguation)
- Vienna Convention (disambiguation)
