= Vienna Convention =

Vienna Convention can mean any of a number of treaties signed in Vienna. Most are related to the harmonization or formalization of the procedures of international diplomacy, but some are not.

- several treaties and conventions resulted from the Congress of Vienna (1814–15) which redrew the map of Europe, only partially restoring the pre-Napoleonic situation, and drafted new rules for international relations
- Vienna Convention on Money (1857)
- Vienna Convention on Diplomatic Relations (1961)
- Vienna Convention on Civil Liability for Nuclear Damage (1963)
- Vienna Convention on Consular Relations (1963)
- Vienna Convention on Road Traffic (1968)
- Vienna Convention on Road Signs and Signals (1968)
- Vienna Convention on the Law of Treaties (1969)
- Vienna Agreement Establishing an International Classification of the Figurative Elements of Marks, on intellectual property law (1972)
- Convention on the Issue of Multilingual Extracts from Civil Status Records (1976)
- Vienna Convention on Succession of States in respect of Treaties (1978)
- United Nations Convention on Contracts for the International Sale of Goods (1980), a uniform international sales law
- Vienna Convention on Succession of States in Respect of State Property, Archives and Debts (1983)
- Vienna Convention for the Protection of the Ozone Layer (1985)
- Vienna Convention on the Law of Treaties between States and International Organizations or between International Organizations (1986)
- United Nations Convention Against Illicit Traffic in Narcotic Drugs and Psychotropic Substances (1988)
- Joint Comprehensive Plan of Action, on the Nuclear Program of Iran (2015)

== See also ==
- Congress of Vienna (disambiguation)
- Treaty of Vienna (disambiguation)
- Vienna Agreement
- Vienna Conference (disambiguation)
- Vienna Declaration and Programme of Action, a 1993 United Nations human rights declaration
- Vienna System (bridge), a highly-conventional bidding system in the game of contract bridge
