= August Reinisch =

Austrian public international lawyer

August Reinisch (born 29 January 1965 in Vienna) is an Austrian public international lawyer.

== Biography ==
He obtained Master’s degrees in law (1988) and in philosophy (1990) as well as an LL.M. from NYU Law School (1989) and a doctorate in law from the University of Vienna (1991). He is admitted to the Bars of New York and of Connecticut (since 1990). In 1994, he obtained the Diploma of the Hague Academy of International Law. In 2024, he delivered a special course on “The Settlement of Disputes Involving International Organizations” at The Hague Winter Academy.

He received his venia docendi (right to teach as a professor of international and European law) at the University of Vienna in 1998. At this university, he has been Head of the Section International Law and International Relations since 2005 and Director of the LL.M. Program in International Legal Studies since 2006. From 2004 to 2006 and from 2010 to 2016, he was Dean for International Relations of the Law School of the University of Vienna. Since 2010, he has been professor of international law with a focus on international economic law and the law of international organizations. From 2016 to 2019, he served as a Member of the Academic Senate of the University of Vienna.

August Reinisch has served as arbitrator in investment cases mostly in disputes under the International Centre for Settlement of Investment and the UNCITRAL Arbitration Rules, and provided expert opinions in the field. He is a Member of the International Centre for Settlement of Investment Disputes Panels of Conciliators and of Arbitrators and of the Court of the Permanent Court of Arbitration. He has served for 20 years pro bono on the In Rem Restitution Panel according to the Austrian General Settlement Fund Law in Vienna/Austria (2001 – 2021), dealing with Holocaust-related property claims.

== Memberships ==
He has been a member of the International Law Commission since 2017 and, since 2022, he has been serving as the Commission’s Special Rapporteur on the topic “Settlement of disputes to which international organizations are parties.” In this capacity, he submitted three reports in 2023, 2024 and 2025. He is a member of the Institut de droit international and corresponding member of the Austrian Academy of Sciences, president of the Austrian Branch of the International Law Association and former President of the German Society of International Law.

== Notable awards ==
In 2021, he received the Austrian Cross of Honour for Science and Art, First Class.

== Publications (selection) ==
- US-Exportkontrollrecht in Österreich. (Vienna, Manz-Verlag 1991) (Vol. 16 Recht-Wirtschaft-Außenhandel, P. Doralt/H. Haschek, eds.), 146 pp. ISBN 3-214-06565-3.
- State responsibility for debts. Debts (Vienna – Cologne – Weimar, Böhlau-Verlag 1995) (Vol. 5 Europarecht – Internationales Wirtschafts-/Währungsrecht – Völkerrecht, ed. by Waldemar Hummer), 154 pp., ISBN 3-205-98293-2.
- with Gerhard Hafner: Staatensukzession und Schuldenübernahme. Beim "Zerfall" der Sowjetunion. (Vienna, Service Fachverlag 1995) (vol. 9 FOWI-Schriftenreihe, ed. by Doralt), 168 pp., ISBN 3-85428-320-2.
- International Organizations before National Courts (Cambridge, Cambridge University Press 2000) (Vol. 10 Cambridge Studies in International and Comparative Law, ed. by James Crawford), 449 pp.
- Recent Developments in International Investment Law (Paris, Pedone 2009), 81 pp.
- with Christoph Schreuer, Loretta Malintoppi and Anthony Sinclair: The ICSID Convention: A Commentary (Cambridge, Cambridge University Press, 2nd ed., 2009), 1524 pp.
- Essentials of EU Law (Cambridge, Cambridge University Press, 2nd ed., 2012), 281 pp.
- with Marc Bungenberg: From Bilateral Arbitral Tribunals and Investment Courts to a Multilateral Investment Court. Options Regarding the Institutionalization of Investor-State Dispute Settlement. (Special Issue of European Yearbook of International Economic Law, Springer, 2nd ed., 2020), pp. 222., ISBN 3-662-59731-4.
- Advanced Introduction to International Investment Law (Cheltenham, UK – Northampton, MA, USA, Edward Elgar Publishing, 2020), pp. 136.
- with Christoph Schreuer: International Protection of Investments. The Substantive Standards (Cambridge, Cambridge University Press 2020), pp. 1098.
- with Marc Bungenberg: Draft Statute of the Multilateral Investment Court (Studies in International Investment Law Vol. 37, Baden-Baden, Nomos 2021), pp. 80.
