= Vital record =

Government records of citizens' life events (births, deaths, marriages, etc.)

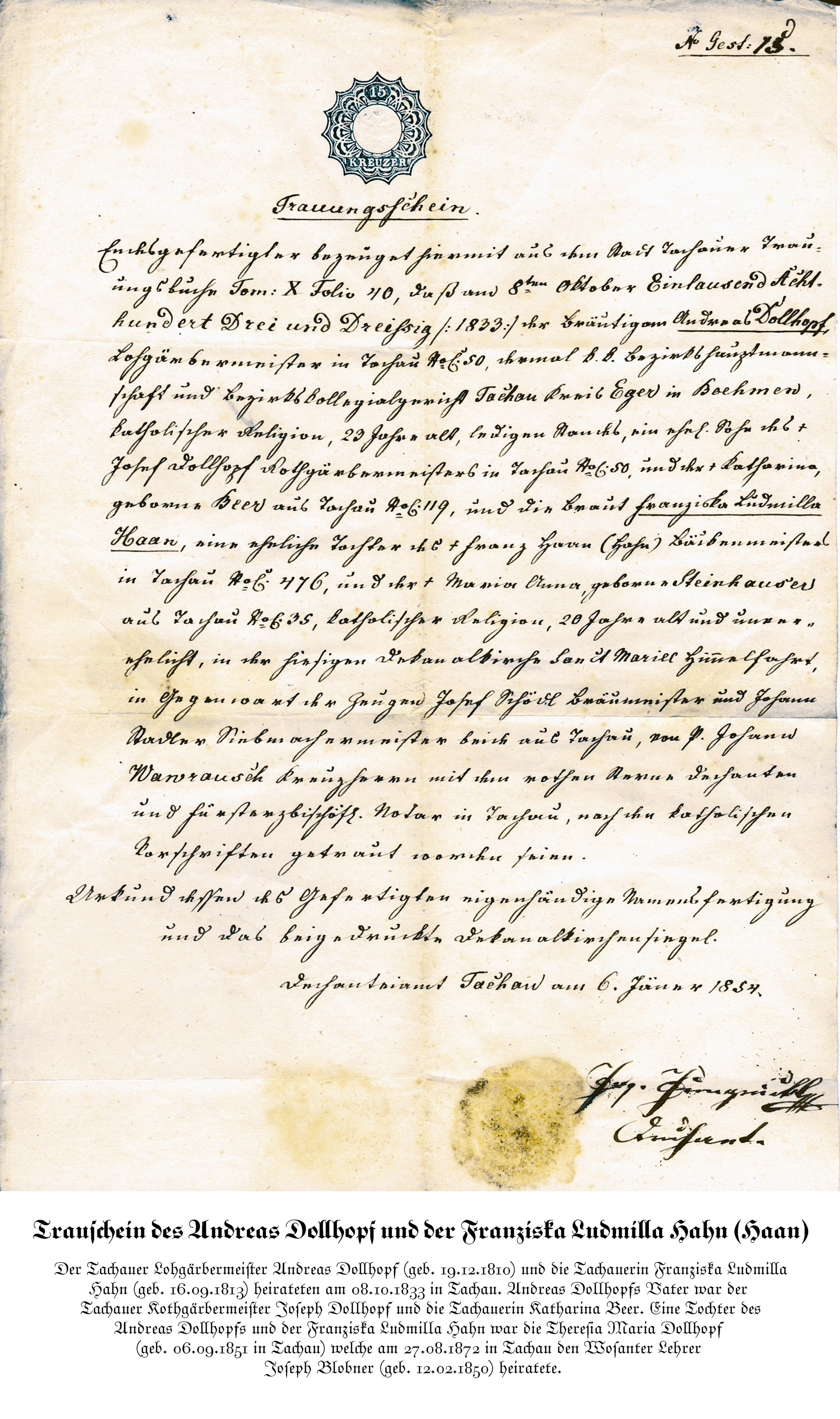
Austrian marriage license (duplicate) from 1854

Vital records are records of life events kept under governmental authority, including birth certificates, marriage licenses (or marriage certificates), separation agreements, divorce certificates or divorce party and death certificates. In some jurisdictions, vital records may also include records of civil unions or domestic partnerships.

== United States ==
In the United States, vital records are typically maintained at both the county and state levels. In the United Kingdom and numerous other countries vital records are recorded in the civil registry. In the United States, vital records are public and in most cases can be viewed by anyone in person at the governmental authority. Copies can also be requested for a fee. There are two types of copies: certified and uncertified. Certified copies are official copies that can be used as identification whereas uncertified copies do not contain the governmental authority's seal and often are marked that they should not be used for identification. There may be additional restrictions in place on who can actually request a certified copy, such as immediate family or someone with written authorization. Certified copies are usually much more expensive than uncertified copies. Some states have started making vital records available online for free. Vital records that are online typically are 90 or more years old and assume the person listed in the record is no longer alive.

== Europe ==
Various European countries are members of an International Commission on Civil Status which provides a mutually recognized convention on the coding of entries appearing in civil status documents, with common codes and translation tables between the language of the member states. They also provide an English unofficial translation.

=== Italy ===
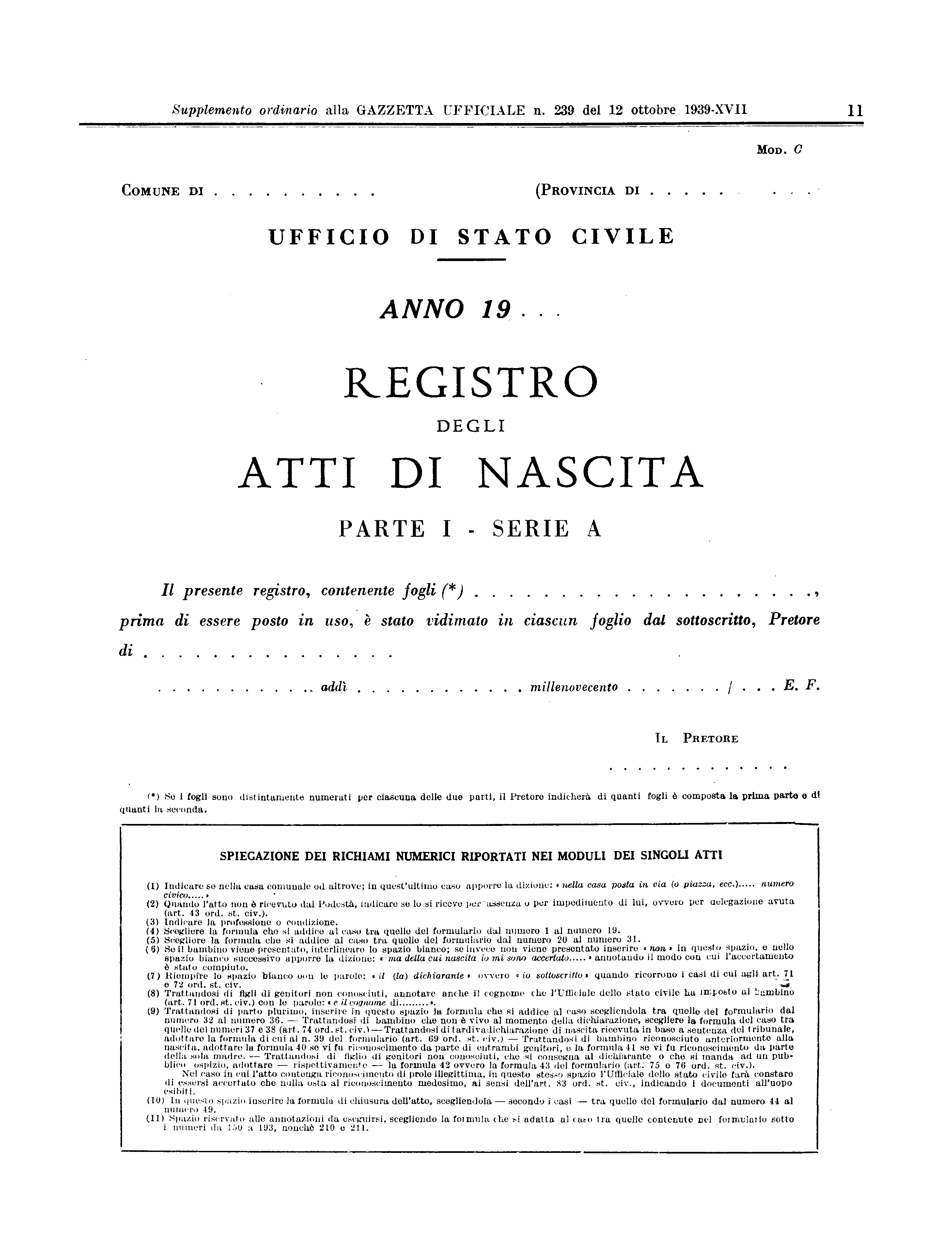
1939 form for the frontispiece of birth records

Italy has one of the most comprehensive civil status laws in Europe; it originated in the late 19th century and was later consolidated by Mussolini government. Every Italian municipality has a civil registrar, who, in the absence of delegates, is the mayor. This officer maintains the civil status registers, which include citizenship, births, marriage banns, marriages, and deaths. The registers were paper-based until the 2020s; subsequently, amid strong protests from professionals, they were moved to centralized electronic storage.

== Challenges ==
In the past 10 years, there has been an overall increase in global birth registration rates of children under five from 58 percent to 65 percent. However, more than 100 developing countries still do not have functioning systems that can support efficient registration of births and other life events like marriages and death. Around the world, almost 230 million children under the age of five are not registered. Sub-Saharan Africa is home to 85 million of these children, while 135 million live in Asia and the Pacific. Progress with death registration has been much slower globally. In countries in most need of CRVS, up to 80 percent of deaths that occur outside health facilities and two-thirds of all deaths globally are not counted.

== See also ==
- Civil registration
- Vital statistics (government records)
