= Convention on the recognition of decisions recording a sex reassignment =

- Signed: 12 September 2000
- Location: Vienna, Austria
- Effective: 1 March 2011
- Condition: 2 ratifications
- Signatories: Austria; Germany; Greece; Netherlands; Spain
- Parties: Netherlands; Spain
- Depositary: Switzerland
- Language: French

The Convention on the recognition of decisions recording a sex reassignment (French: Convention relative à la reconnaissance des décisions constatant un changement de sexe) is a multilateral convention, drafted by the International Commission on Civil Status which provides the acceptance in other countries of decisions by the authorities (courts or administrative divisions) on a sex change. Sex changes of nationals or residents are recognized in the other member states if the sex change has been performed physically (and is recorded as such). This is registered in a change of the birth certificate.

== Member states and signatories ==
The convention has been ratified by Spain and the Netherlands. It has been signed but not ratified by Austria, Germany and Greece.

== See also ==
- International Commission on Civil Status
