= Vienna Conference =

Vienna Conference can refer to:

- Vienna Socialist Conference of 1915
- Vienna Conference (August 1, 1917)
- Vienna Conference (1961), resulted in the Vienna Convention on Diplomatic Relations and the Vienna Convention on Consular Relations
- Vienna Conference (1969), resulted in the Vienna Convention on the Law of Treaties
- Vienna Conference on Science and Technology for Development, 1979 see Commission on Science and Technology for Development
- Vienna Conference (1985), was the first international conference on ozone layer depletion.
- Vienna Conference (1993), also known as the World Conference on Human Rights, resulted in the Vienna Declaration and Programme of Action

See also

- Congress of Vienna (disambiguation)
- Treaty of Vienna (disambiguation)
- Vienna Convention (disambiguation)
