= United Nations General Assembly Resolution 97 (I) =

UN General Assembly Resolution 97 (1)
- United Nations General Assembly Resolution 97(1); Registration and Publication of Treaties and International Agreements: Regulations to give effect to ARTICLE 102 of the Charter of the United Nations
- Date: 14 December 1946
- Meeting no.: fifty fifth plenary
- Code: A/RES/97(1) (Document)
- Subject: Registration and Publication of Treaties and International Agreements: Regulations to give effect to Article 102 of the Charter of the United Nations
- Result: Adopted

United Nations General Assembly Resolution 97 (1) of 14 December 1946, titled "Registration and Publication of Treaties and International Agreements: Regulations to give effect to Article 102 of the Charter of the United Nations", was a resolution of the United Nations General Assembly during its first session that affirmed that Adopted by the General Assembly on [Resolution 97 (1)], as modified by resolutions 364 B (IV), 482 (V) and 33/141 A, adopted by the General Assembly on 1 December 1949, 12 December 1950 and 18 December 1978, respectively.

The resolution on Registration and Publication of Treaties and International Agreements: Regulations to give effect to Article 102 of the Charter of the United Nations invited the Secretariat of the United Nations to draw up an international treaty and international agreements that would oblige Registration and Publication of Treaties and International Agreements and a certified statement regarding any subsequent action which effects a change in the parties thereto, or the terms, scope or application thereof, shall also be registered with the Secretariat of the United Nations and published by it.

No party to any such treaty or international agreement which has not been registered in accordance with the provisions of paragraph 1 of this Article may invoke that treaty or agreement before any organ of the United Nations.

The Secretary-General, or his representative, shall issue certified extracts from the Register at the request of any Member of the United Nations or any party to the treaty or international agreement concerned.

== See also ==
- United Nations Treaty Series
- Vienna Convention on the Law of Treaties (1969)
