= Ratification =

Process of putting into effect a documentation in international law

Ratification is a principal's legal confirmation of an act of its agent. In international law, ratification is the process by which a state declares its consent to be bound to a treaty. In the case of bilateral treaties, ratification is usually accomplished by exchanging the requisite instruments, and in the case of multilateral treaties, the usual procedure is for the depositary to collect the ratifications of all states, keeping all parties informed of the situation.

The institution of ratification grants states the necessary time-frame to seek the required approval for the treaty on the domestic level and to enact the necessary legislation to give domestic effect to that treaty. The term applies to private contract law, international treaties, and constitutions in federal states such as the United States and Canada. The term is also used in parliamentary procedure in deliberative assemblies.

== Contract law ==
In contract law, the need for ratification often arises in two ways: if the agent attempts to bind the principal despite lacking the authority to do so; and if the principal authorizes the agent to make an agreement, but reserves the right to approve it. An example of the former situation is an employee not normally responsible for procuring supplies contracting to do so on the employer's behalf. The employer's choice on discovering the contract is to ratify it or to repudiate it.

The latter situation is common in trade union collective bargaining agreements. The union authorizes one or more people to negotiate and sign an agreement with management. A collective bargaining agreement can not become legally binding until the union members ratify the agreement. If the union members do not approve it, the agreement is void, and negotiations resume.

== Parliamentary procedure ==
A deliberative assembly, using parliamentary procedure, could ratify action that otherwise was not validly taken. For example, action taken where there was no quorum at the meeting is not valid until it is later ratified at a meeting where a quorum is present.

== Ratification of an international treaty ==
The ratification of international treaties is always accomplished by filing instruments of ratification as provided for in the treaty. In many democracies, the legislature authorizes the government to ratify treaties through standard legislative procedures by passing a bill.

=== Australia ===
In Australia, power to enter into treaties is an executive power within Section 61 of the Australian Constitution so the Australian Government may enter into a binding treaty without seeking parliamentary approval. Nevertheless, most treaties are tabled in parliament for between 15 and 20 joint sitting days for scrutiny by the Joint Standing Committee on Treaties, and if implementation of treaties requires legislation by the Australian parliament, this must be passed by both houses prior to ratification.

=== India ===
The President makes a treaty in exercise of his executive power, on the aid and the advice of the Council of Ministers headed by the Prime Minister, and no court of law in India may question its validity. However, no agreement or treaty entered into by the president is enforceable by the courts which is incompatible with Indian constitution/ national law, as India follows dualist theory for the implementation of international laws.

If the Parliament wishes to codify the agreement entered into by the executive thereby making it enforceable by the courts of India, it may do so under Article 253 of the constitution.

=== Japan ===
In Japan, in principle both houses of the parliament (the National Diet) must approve the treaty for ratification. If the House of Councilors rejects a treaty approved by the House of Representatives, and a joint committee of both houses cannot come to agreement on amendments to the original text of the treaty, or the House of Councilors fails to decide on a treaty for more than thirty days, the House of Representatives the will be regarded as the vote of the National Diet approving the ratification. The approved treaty will then be promulgated into law by the act of the Emperor.

=== United Kingdom ===
Treaty ratification is a royal prerogative, exercised by the monarch on the advice of the government. By a convention called the Ponsonby Rule, treaties were usually placed before Parliament for 21 days before ratification, but Parliament has no power to veto or to ratify. The Ponsonby Rule was put on a statutory footing by Part 2 of the Constitutional Reform and Governance Act 2010.

=== United States ===
Treaty power is a coordinated effort between the Executive branch and the Senate. The President may form and negotiate, but the treaty must be advised and consented to by a two-thirds vote in the Senate. Only after the Senate approves the treaty can the President ratify it. Once it is ratified, it becomes binding on all the states under the Supremacy Clause. While the House of Representatives does not vote on it at all, the supermajority requirement for the Senate's advice and consent to ratification makes it considerably more difficult to rally enough political support for international treaties. Also, if implementation of the treaty requires the expenditure of funds, the House of Representatives may be able to block or at least impede such implementation by refusing to vote for the appropriation of the necessary funds.

The President usually submits a treaty to the Senate Foreign Relations Committee (SFRC) along with an accompanying resolution of ratification or accession. If the treaty and resolution receive favorable committee consideration (a committee vote in favor of ratification or accession), the treaty is then forwarded to the floor of the full Senate for such a vote. The treaty or legislation does not apply until it has been ratified. A multilateral agreement may provide that it will take effect upon its ratification by less than all of the signatories. Even though such a treaty takes effect, it does not apply to signatories that have not ratified it. Accession has the same legal effect as ratification, for treaties already negotiated and signed by other states. An example of a treaty to which the Senate did not advise and consent to ratification is the Treaty of Versailles, which failed to garner support because of the Covenant of the League of Nations.

The US can also enter into international agreements by way of executive agreements. They are not made under the Treaty Clause and do not require approval by two-thirds of the Senate. Congressional-executive agreements are passed by a majority of both houses of Congress as a regular law. If the agreement is completely within the President's constitutional powers, it can be made by the President alone without Congressional approval, but it will have the force of an executive order and can be unilaterally revoked by a future President. All types of agreements are treated internationally as "treaties". See Foreign policy of the United States#Law.

== Ratification of a constitution ==
Federations usually require the support of both the federal government and some given percentage of the constituent governments for amendments to the federal constitution to take effect.

=== Ratification in the Constitution of India ===
Not all constitutional amendments in India require ratification by the states. Only constitutional amendments that seek to make any change in any of the provisions mentioned in the proviso to Article 368 of the Constitution of India, must be ratified by the Legislatures of not less than one-half of the States. These provisions relate to certain matters concerning the federal structure or of common interest to both the Union and the States viz., the election of the President (articles 54 and 55); the extent of the executive power of the Union and the States (Articles 73 and 162); the High Courts for Union territories (Article 241); The Union Judiciary and the High Courts in the States (Chapter IV of Part V and Chapter V of Part VI); the distribution of legislative powers between the Union and the States (Chapter I of Part XI and Seventh Schedule); the representation of States in Parliament; and the provision for amendment of the Constitution laid down in Article 368. Ratification is done by a resolution passed by the State Legislatures. There is no specific time limit for the ratification of an amending Bill by the State Legislatures. However, the resolutions ratifying the proposed amendment must be passed before the amending Bill is presented to the President for his assent.

However, when the treaty terms are interfering with the powers exclusively applicable to states (State List), prior ratification of all applicable states are to be obtained per Article 252 of the Indian constitution before the ratification by the Parliament.

=== Ratification in the United States Constitution ===
Article VII of the Constitution of the United States describes the process by which the entire document was to become effective. It required that conventions of nine of the thirteen original States ratify the Constitution. If fewer than thirteen states ratified the document, it would become effective only among the states ratifying it. New Hampshire was the ninth state to ratify, doing so on June 21, 1788, but, as a practical matter, it was decided to delay implementation of the new government until New York and Virginia could be persuaded to ratify. Congress intended that New York City should be the first capital, and that George Washington, of Mount Vernon, Virginia, should be the first President, and both of those things would have been somewhat awkward if either New York or Virginia were not part of the new government. Ratification by those states was secured—Virginia on June 25 and New York on July 26—and the government under the Constitution began on March 4, 1789.

For subsequent amendments, Article V describes the process of a potential amendment's adoption. Proposals to adopt an amendment may be called either by a two-thirds vote by both houses of Congress or by a national convention as a result of resolutions adopted by two-thirds (presently at least 34 out of 50) of the states' legislatures. For a proposed amendment to be adopted, three-quarters of the states (presently at least 38 out of 50) must then ratify the amendment either by a vote of approval in each state's legislature or by state ratifying conventions. Congress may specify which method must be used to ratify the amendment. Congress may also set a deadline by which the threshold for adoption must be met.

== See also ==
- Constitutional amendment
- Veto
- Vienna Convention on the Law of Treaties
