= Convention on the Issue of Multilingual Extracts from Civil Status Records =

1976 multilateral convention

Convention on the issue of multilingual extracts from civil status records
- Signed: 8 September 1976
- Location: Vienna, Austria
- Effective: 30 July 1983
- Condition: 5 ratifications
- Parties: 24
- Depositary: Switzerland
- Language: French

The Convention on the issue of multilingual extracts from civil status records (French: Convention relative à la délivrance d'extraits plurilingues d'actes de l'état civil) is an international treaty drafted by the International Commission on Civil Status defining a uniform format for birth, marriage and death certificates. Documents issued in this format by a party to the convention are accepted in all other parties without translation or legalisation.

The convention was signed in Vienna on 8 September 1976 by 12 European states, and entered into force on 30 July 1983 after the ratification of five states. As of 2025, the convention is in force in 23 European states and Cape Verde. The convention remains open for accession by any state.

== Provisions ==
Upon request, parties to the convention must issue extracts from civil status records in specific formats: Formule A for birth certificates, Formule B for marriage certificates, and Formule C for death certificates. The front of the document must display standard words at least in an official language of the issuing state and in French, and the back of the document must include translations of the words in several additional languages. (Note: The required additional languages are one official language of each state that was a member of the International Commission on Civil Status when the convention was signed (Dutch, French, German, Greek, Italian, Portuguese, Spanish and Turkish) or a party to a similar earlier convention (Serbo-Croatian), and English. Official languages of states that acceded to the convention later are optional.)

Parties must accept documents in these formats issued by each other in the same way as those issued domestically, without the need for translation or legalisation. Any fee for issuing documents in the convention format must not be higher than for those issued in the usual format in the same state.

== Parties ==
| State | Signature | Ratification | Entry into force |
|---|---|---|---|
| Austria | 8 September 1976 | 12 March 1981 | 30 July 1983 |
| Belgium | 8 September 1976 | 2 June 1997 | 2 July 1997 |
| Bosnia and Herzegovina (Note: Yugoslavia signed the convention on 8 September 1976, ratified it on 20 June 1990, and it enter into force for this state on 20 July 1990. Its successor states Bosnia and Herzegovina, Montenegro, North Macedonia and Serbia declared to continue applying the convention since their independence, while Croatia and Slovenia acceded to the convention as new states.) | – | 11 October 1995 | 6 March 1992 |
| Bulgaria | – | 18 November 2013 | 18 December 2013 |
| Cape Verde | – | 17 September 2015 | 17 October 2015 |
| Croatia | – | 22 September 1993 | 22 October 1993 |
| Estonia | – | 24 November 2011 | 24 December 2011 |
| France (Note: Only applies to Metropolitan France.) | 8 September 1976 | 17 December 1986 | 16 January 1987 |
| Germany | – | 18 June 1997 | 18 July 1997 |
| Greece | 8 September 1976 | – | – |
| Italy | 8 September 1976 | 14 August 1979 | 30 July 1983 |
| Lithuania | – | 30 December 2009 | 29 January 2010 |
| Luxembourg | 8 September 1976 | 28 April 1978 | 30 July 1983 |
| Moldova | – | 15 April 2008 | 15 May 2008 |
| Montenegro | – | 26 March 2007 | 3 June 2006 |
| Netherlands (Note: Only applies to the European part of the Kingdom of the Netherlands.) | 8 September 1976 | 27 March 1987 | 26 April 1987 |
| North Macedonia | – | 15 April 1994 | 17 November 1991 |
| Poland | – | 2 October 2003 | 1 November 2003 |
| Portugal | 8 September 1976 | 30 June 1983 | 30 July 1983 |
| Romania | – | 6 May 2013 | 5 June 2013 |
| Serbia | – | 16 October 2001 | 27 April 1992 |
| Slovenia | – | 1 December 1992 | 31 December 1992 |
| Spain | 8 September 1976 | 25 March 1980 | 30 July 1983 |
| Switzerland | 8 September 1976 | 19 March 1990 | 18 April 1990 |
| Turkey | 8 September 1976 | 31 May 1985 | 30 June 1985 |

== Related conventions ==
This convention replaced the Convention on the issue of certain extracts from civil status records for use abroad, signed in Paris on 27 September 1956, which had required the information on the document to be provided in seven languages. The convention of 1976 allowed languages of additional parties, and simplified the presentation by requiring only two languages on the front of the document and the remaining languages on the back. It also harmonised the document format with the Convention introducing an international family record book, signed in Paris on 12 September 1974. After all parties to the convention of 1956 joined to the convention of 1976, the former ceased to be in force anywhere.

The Convention on the issue of multilingual and coded certificates and extracts from civil status records, signed in Strasbourg on 14 March 2014, is an update to the convention of 1976, to extend its provisions to documents acknowledging parentage, registered partnership and same-sex marriage, electronic transmission of documents, specify the formats more precisely, and add a verification procedure. After the convention of 2014 entered into force for its first ratifying states in 2022, the convention of 1976 does not apply between new states joining the convention of 1976 and parties to the convention of 2014. However, the convention of 1976 remains in force between its parties that have not joined the updated convention, and between these parties who joined before 2022 and parties to the convention of 2014.

The European Union adopted a similar regulation establishing multilingual forms of many types of documents, allowing such documents issued by its member states to be accepted by each other without the need for translation or legalisation.

== See also ==
- Apostille Convention
