= Vienna Convention on the Law of Treaties =

International agreement

Vienna Convention on the Law of Treaties
Parties
Signatories
Non-parties
- Signed: 23 May 1969
- Location: Vienna, Austria
- Effective: 27 January 1980
- Condition: Ratification by 35 states
- Signatories: 45
- Parties: 119 (as of May 2026)
- Depositary: UN Secretary-General
- Languages: Arabic, Chinese, English, French, and Russian

Full text
- Vienna Convention on the Law of Treaties at Wikisource

The Vienna Convention on the Law of Treaties (VCLT) is an international agreement that regulates treaties among sovereign states.

Known as the "treaty on treaties", the VCLT establishes comprehensive, operational guidelines, rules, and procedures for how treaties are drafted, defined, amended, and interpreted. The VCLT defines a treaty as an international agreement in writing concluded between states governed by international law.

The Vienna Convention on the Law of Treaties was adopted and opened to signature on 23 May 1969, became effective on 27 January 1980, and has been ratified by 119 sovereign states as of May 2026. Non-ratifying parties, such as the U.S., have recognized parts of the VCLT as a restatement of customary international law. In treaty law, the VCLT is the authority for resolving disputes about the interpretation of a treaty.

The VCLT definition of a treaty is not universally accepted. For instance, VCLT defines a treaty as between states, excluding non-state actors (such as international organizations). Treaties may also be defined differently under domestic law, as certain prerequisites have to be met for something to count as a treaty.

== History ==
The Vienna Convention on the Law of Treaties (VCLT) was drafted by the International Law Commission (ILC) of the United Nations, which began work on the convention in 1949. During the 20 years of preparation, several draft versions of the convention and commentaries were prepared by special rapporteurs of the ILC, which included prominent international law scholars James Brierly, Hersch Lauterpacht, Gerald Fitzmaurice, and Humphrey Waldock.

In 1966, the ILC adopted 75 draft articles, which formed the basis for its final work. Over two sessions in 1968 and 1969, the Vienna Conference completed the convention, which was adopted on 22 May 1969 and opened for signature on the following day.

== Content and effects ==
In the practices of international law, the Vienna Convention on the Law of Treaties is the legal authority about the formation and effects of a treaty. Parts of the VCLT are recognised by non-signator countries, such as the U.S. and India, as legally binding upon all sovereign states who have recognised the customary-law status of the Vienna Convention.

The VCLT defines a treaty as "an international agreement concluded between [sovereign] states in written form and governed by international law", and affirms that "every state possesses the capacity to conclude treaties." Article 1 of the VCLT restricts the application of the convention to written treaties between states, excluding treaties concluded between the states and international organizations or between international organizations. Article 11 defines "means of expressing consent to be bound by a treaty" including ratification, acceptance, approval or accession. Article 26 defines pacta sunt servanda, that agreements must be kept; Article 53 defines jus cogens, peremptory norm; Article 62 defines Fundamental Change of Circumstance, which determines the validity or invalidity of a treaty; and Article 77 defines depositary, the organisation or person who holds a multilateral treaty.

== Scope ==
The Vienna Convention applies only to treaties agreed after the VCLT was ratified and to treaties agreed between sovereign states, but it does not govern other agreements between sovereign states and international organizations or between international organizations, if any VCLT rules are independently binding upon such international organizations. In practise, Article 2 and Article 5 of the Vienna Convention apply to treaties between sovereign states and an intergovernmental organization.

However, agreements between states and international organizations or between international organizations themselves are governed by the 1986 Vienna Convention on the Law of Treaties between States and International Organizations or Between International Organizations if it enters into force. Furthermore, in treaties between states and international organizations, the terms of the Convention still apply between the state members. The Convention does not apply to unwritten agreements.

== Parties to the convention ==
As of May 2026, there are 119 state parties that have ratified the convention, and a further 15 states have signed but have not ratified the convention. In addition, the Republic of China (Taiwan), which is currently recognized by 11 UN member states, signed the Convention in 1970 prior to the UN General Assembly's 1971 vote to transfer China's seat to the People's Republic of China, which subsequently acceded to the convention.

There are 61 UN member states that have neither signed nor ratified the convention. France and Norway are the only such countries among large West European nations. France's position is allegedly based on three factors:

1. Sovereignty & Flexibility: Prefers to negotiate treaties without perceived constraints of VCLT procedures (e.g., reservations, termination).
2. Customary Law Sufficiency: Considers core VCLT rules (e.g., pacta sunt servanda) binding as customary law.
3. Constitutional Incompatibility Concerns: Articles 52–55 of the French Constitution (1958) already govern treaty practice.

Norway's positions is justified by:

1. Dualist Legal System, which requires explicit incorporation of treaties into domestic law. VCLT’s automatic applicability conflicts with this principle.
2. Domestic Law Primacy: Norway’s Human Rights Act (1999) and Constitution §115 prioritize statutory implementation of treaties.
3. Practical Redundancy: Norway follows VCLT norms as customary law but views formal adherence as unnecessary.

== Vienna formula ==
=== Signature, ratification and accession ===
International treaties and conventions contain rules about what entities could sign, ratify or accede to them. Some treaties are restricted to states that are members of the UN or parties to the Statute of the International Court of Justice. In rare cases, there is an explicit list of the entities that the treaty is restricted to. More commonly, the aim of the negotiating states (most or all of which usually end up becoming the founding signatories) is that the treaty is not restricted to particular states and so a wording like "this treaty is open for signature to States willing to accept its provisions" is used (the "all states formula").

In the case of regional organizations, such as the Council of Europe or the Organization of American States, the set of negotiating states that once agreed upon may sign and ratify the treaty is usually limited to its own member states, and non-member states may accede to it later. However, sometimes a specific set of non-member states or non-state actors may be invited to join negotiations. For example, the Council of Europe invited the "non-member States" Canada, the Holy See (Vatican City), Japan, Mexico and the United States to "participate in the elaboration" of the 2011 Istanbul Convention and specifically allowed the European Union (described as an "International Organisation", rather than a "State") to sign and ratify the convention, rather than accede to it, and "other non-member States" were allowed only accession.

The act of signing and ratifying a treaty as a negotiating state has the same effect as the act of acceding to a treaty (or "acceding a treaty") by a state that was not involved in its negotiation. Usually, accessions occur only after the treaty has entered into force, but the UN Secretary-General has occasionally accepted accessions even before a treaty went into force. The only downside of not being a negotiating state is that one has no influence over the contents of a treaty, but one is still allowed to declare reservations concerning specific provisions of the treaty that one wishes to accede to (Article 19).

=== Statehood question ===
When a treaty is open to "States", it may be difficult or impossible for the depositary authority to determine which entities are States. If the treaty is restricted to Members of the United Nations or Parties to the Statute of the International Court of Justice, there is no ambiguity. However, a difficulty has occurred as to possible participation in treaties when entities that appeared otherwise to be States could not be admitted to the United Nations or become Parties to the Statute of the International Court of Justice because of the opposition for political reasons of a permanent member of the Security Council or have not applied for ICJ or UN membership. Since that difficulty did not arise as concerns membership in the specialized agencies, on which there is no "veto" procedure, a number of those States became members of specialized agencies and so were in essence recognized as States by the international community. Accordingly, to allow for as wide a participation as possible, several conventions then provided that they were also open for participation to state members of specialized agencies. The type of entry-into-force clause used in the Vienna Convention on the Law of Treaties was later called the "Vienna formula", and various treaties, conventions and organizations used its wording.

Some treaties that use it include provisions that in addition to these States any other State invited by a specified authority or organization (commonly the United Nations General Assembly or an institution created by the treaty in question) can also participate, thus making the scope of potential signatories even broader.

The present Convention shall be open for signature by all States Members of the United Nations or of any of the specialized agencies or the International Atomic Energy Agency or parties to the Statute of the International Court of Justice, and by any other State invited by the General Assembly of the United Nations to become a party to the Convention, as follows: until 30 November 1969, at the Federal Ministry for Foreign Affairs of the Republic of Austria, and subsequently, until 30 April 1970, at United Nations Headquarters, New York.

— Vienna Convention on the Law of Treaties, Article 81, Signature

== Interpretation of treaties ==
Articles 31–33 of the VCLT entail principles for interpreting conventions, treaties, etc. These principles are recognized as representing customary international law, for example by the International Law Commission (ILC).

The interpretational principles codified in Article 31 are to be used before applying those of Article 32, which explicitly states that it offers supplementary means of interpretation.

The European Court of Justice has also applied the interpretational provisions of the VCLT in different cases, including the Bosphorus Queen Case (2018), in which the court interpreted the extent of the term "any resources" in Article 220(6) of UNCLOS.

The VCLT is often relied upon in investment arbitration cases.

== See also ==
- United Nations General Assembly Resolution 97 (1) (1946)
- Vienna Convention on Diplomatic Relations (1961)
- Vienna Convention on Consular Relations (1963)
- Vienna Convention on Succession of States in respect of Treaties (1978)
- List of Vienna conventions
- Provisional application (treaty)
