= Vienna Convention on Succession of States in Respect of State Property, Archives and Debts =

1983 international treaty

- Signed: 8 April 1983
- Location: Vienna
- Condition: 15 ratifications
- Depositary: Secretary-General of the United Nations
- Languages: Arabic, Chinese, English, French, Russian and Spanish

The Vienna Convention on Succession of States in Respect of State Property, Archives and Debts is an international treaty opened for signature in 1983 to set rules on succession of states.

The convention was adopted on 7 April 1983, and was opened for signature on 8 April 1983, by the United Nations Conference on Succession of States in respect of State Property, Archives and Debts. The Convention remained open for signature until 30 June 1984, and it has not entered into force due to the lack of signatories.

It was adopted partly in response to the "profound transformation of the international community brought about by the decolonization process", and it aimed to address the "need for the codification and progressive development of the rules relating to succession of States in respect of State property, archives and debts as a means for ensuring greater juridical security in international relations".

== Reasons for low adoption ==
According to the International Law Association,

The Vienna Convention on Succession of States in Respect of State Property, Archives and Debts generally adopted subsidiary rules, privileging agreement amongst the concerned States. The only exception is the applicable rules regarding the newly independent States, stating that agreements cannot overrule the principle of permanent sovereignty over natural resources. The favorable treatment accorded to these States lead to the rejection of the Convention by many States.

== Parties to the Convention ==
Participation

As of February 2019, there are 7 state parties which have ratified the convention. A further 7 states signed the convention but have not ratified it.

Participant	Signature	Ratification, Accession (a)
Algeria	16 May 1983	
Argentina	30 December 1983	
Croatia		11 April 1994, a
Egypt	30 June 1984	
Estonia		21 October 1991, a
Georgia		12 July 1993, a
Liberia		16 September 2005, a
Montenegro	23 October 2006	
Niger	23 May 1984	
North Macedonia		2 September 1997, a
Peru	10 November 1983	
Serbia	12 March 2001	
Slovenia		15 August 2002, a
Ukraine		8 January 1993, a

== See also ==
- Vienna Convention on Succession of States in Respect of Treaties
