= Document legalization =

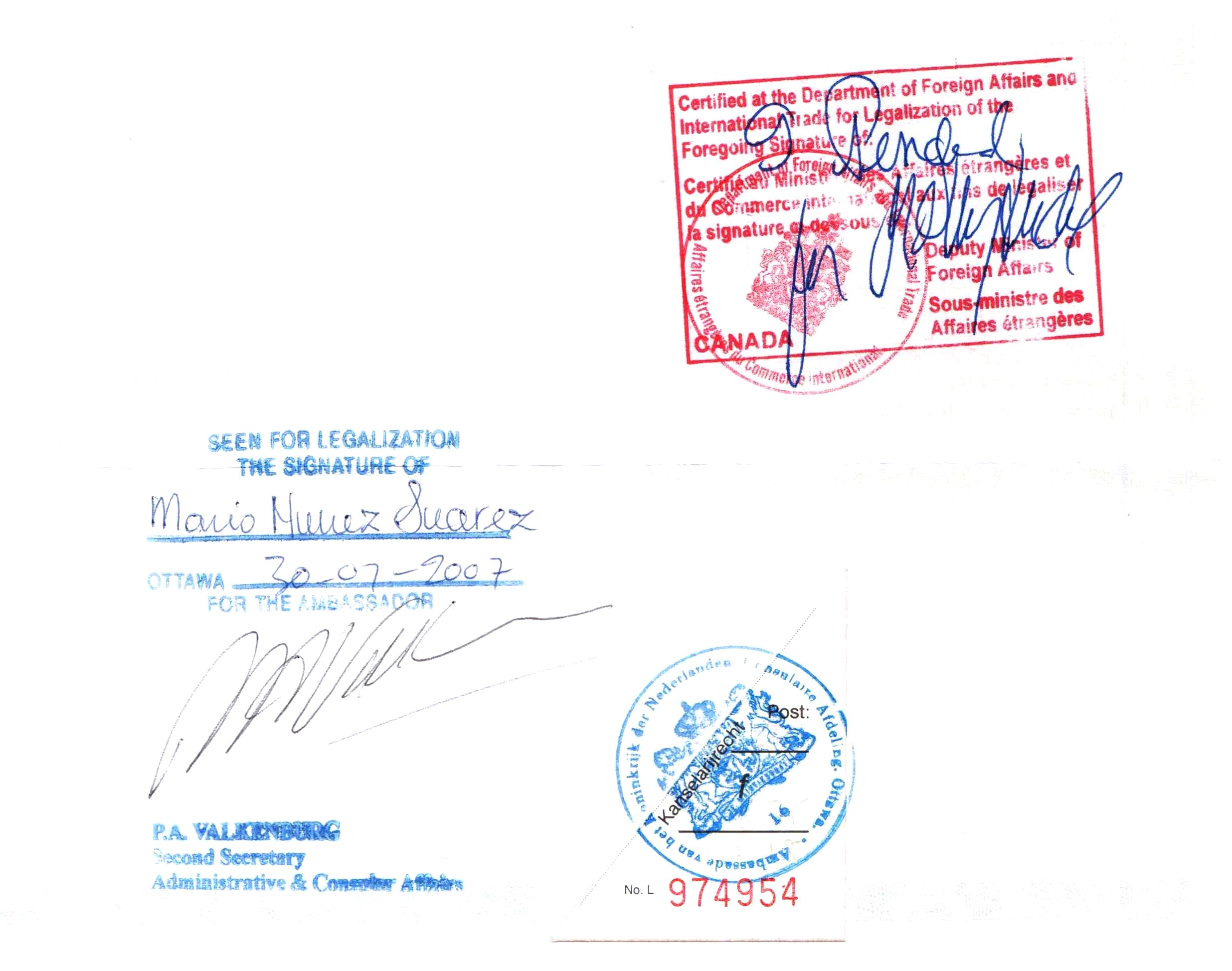
Legalization of a Canadian document for use in the Netherlands. The document was certified by the Canadian Department of Foreign Affairs and International Trade and subsequently by the Embassy of the Netherlands in Canada.

In international law, document legalization is the process of authenticating or certifying a document so it can be accepted in another country.

== Rationale and procedure ==
Due to the lack of familiarity with foreign documents or the entities that issue them, many countries require the verification of the authenticity of foreign documents, in a procedure called legalization, for the document to be legally valid there. This legalization procedure generally consists of a chain of certifications, by one or more authorities of the country of origin of the document and of the destination country. The first authority certifies the issuer of the document, and each subsequent authority certifies the previous one, until the final certification is made by an authority of the destination country that can be recognized by the final user there.

The certifying authorities generally include the ministry of foreign affairs or equivalent of the country of origin and an embassy or consulate of the destination country located in the country of origin. For example, a Malaysian document to be used in the Netherlands must be certified by the Ministry of Foreign Affairs of Malaysia and then by the Embassy of the Netherlands in Malaysia.

Some cases may require more certifications. For example, to be accepted in Egypt, a document from the U.S. state of Maryland not issued by a government official must be certified by a notary public, who must then be certified by the clerk of the circuit court in the notary's county, who must then be certified by the Maryland Secretary of State, which must then be certified by the U.S. Department of State, which must finally be certified by the Embassy of Egypt in the United States. Similarly, a notarized document from South Africa must be certified by the registrar of the High Court in the notary's jurisdiction, who must then be certified by the Department of International Relations and Cooperation, which must then be certified by an embassy or consulate of the destination country in South Africa. For some destination countries, such as the United Arab Emirates, an additional certification by the ministry of foreign affairs of the destination country is also required.

Not all countries require legalization of foreign documents. For example, Canada, Japan, South Africa, the United Kingdom and the United States generally accept documents from any country without any certification.

=== Terminology ===
The certification of a document for use in another country may be referred to by various words such as attestation, authentication, certification or legalization. Some authorities use different words to refer to specific steps, such as authentication by an authority of the country of origin and legalization by an authority of the destination country, while other authorities use the same word to refer to any step or multiple words interchangeably.

== Agreements ==
Some countries have agreements eliminating the legalization requirement for certain documents issued by each other, such as between Argentina and Italy, between Brazil and France, between parties of the Convention on the Issue of Multilingual Extracts from Civil Status Records, and between parties of the Convention on Legal Assistance and Legal Relations of the Commonwealth of Independent States. The European Union also has a regulation eliminating the legalization requirement for certain documents of its member states to be accepted by each other.

=== Apostille Convention ===
The Apostille Convention is intended to simplify the legalization procedure by replacing it with a certification called an apostille, issued by an authority designated by the country of origin. If the convention applies between two countries, the apostille is sufficient for the document to be accepted in the destination country.

Ideally the apostille would be the only certification needed, but in some cases additional certifications in the country of origin may be required before the apostille is issued. For example, documents not issued by a government official may need to be certified by a notary; in some U.S. states, documents certified by a notary or city official must then be certified by the respective county or court; finally the apostille may be issued, certifying the previous official. In any case, after the apostille, no certification by the destination country is required.

The Apostille Convention requires that countries part of the convention direct their embassies and consulates to no longer perform legalizations of documents where the convention applies. The removal of this service is intended to prevent excessive certifications potentially required by overzealous institutions, but in cases where a consular certification alone would otherwise be sufficient to legalize a document and the apostille procedure requires more steps or higher fees, the convention may actually result in a more complex or more costly procedure to certify the document.
