= Vienna Convention on Succession of States in Respect of Treaties =

1978 international treaty

- Parties Signatories Non-parties
- Signed: August 23, 1978
- Location: Vienna
- Effective: November 6, 1996
- Condition: 15 ratifications
- Parties: 23
- Depositary: Secretary-General of the United Nations
- Languages: Arabic, Chinese, English, French, Russian and Spanish

Full text
- Vienna Convention on Succession of States in respect of Treaties at Wikisource

States succession in respect of treaties (1978)

The Vienna Convention on Succession of States in Respect of Treaties is an international treaty opened for signature in 1978 to set rules on succession of states. It was adopted partly in response to the "profound transformation of the international community brought about by the decolonization process". It entered into force on 6 November 1996, which was triggered by the succession of the Republic of North Macedonia to the treaty giving it the requisite 15 parties.

The treaty has proven to be controversial largely because it distinguishes between "newly independent states" (a euphemism for former colonies) and "cases of separation of parts of a state" (a euphemism for all other new states).

Article 16 states that newly independent states do not inherit the treaty obligations of the colonial power, whereas article 34(1) states that all other new states remain bound by the treaty obligations of the state from which they separated. Moreover, article 17 states that newly independent states may join multilateral treaties to which their former colonizers were a party without the consent of the other parties in most circumstances, whereas article 9 states that all other new states may only join multilateral treaties to which their predecessor states were a part with the consent of the other parties.

== Parties to the convention ==
As of February 2019, there are 23 state parties which have ratified the convention. A further 14 states signed the convention but have not ratified it.

=== List of parties ===
State	Signed	Deposited	Method
Bosnia and Herzegovina		Jul 22, 1993	Succession from Socialist Federal Republic of Yugoslavia
Brazil	Aug 23, 1978	Feb 7, 2019	
Croatia		Oct 22, 1992	Succession from Socialist Federal Republic of Yugoslavia
Cyprus		Mar 12, 2004	Accession
Czech Republic	Feb 22, 1993	Jul 26, 1999	Ratification; Succession to the signature of Czechoslovakia
Dominica		Jun 24, 1988	Accession
Ecuador		Jul 25, 2006	Accession
Egypt		Jul 17, 1986	Accession
Estonia		Oct 21, 1991	Accession
Ethiopia	Aug 23, 1978	May 28, 1980	Ratification
Iraq	May 23, 1979	Dec 5, 1979	Ratification
Liberia		Sep 16, 2005	Accession
Moldova		Feb 9, 2009	Accession
Montenegro		Oct 23, 2006	Succession from Serbia and Montenegro
Morocco		Mar 31, 1983	Accession
North Macedonia		Oct 7, 1996	Succession from Socialist Federal Republic of Yugoslavia
Saint Vincent and the Grenadines		Apr 27, 1999	Accession
Serbia		Mar 12, 2001	Succession as Federal Republic of Yugoslavia from Socialist Federal Republic of Yugoslavia
Seychelles		Feb 22, 1980	Accession
Slovakia	May 28, 1993	Apr 24, 1995	Ratification; Succession to the signature of Czechoslovakia
Slovenia		Jul 6, 1992	Succession from Socialist Federal Republic of Yugoslavia
Tunisia		Sep 16, 1981	Accession
Ukraine		Oct 26, 1992	Accession

=== List of signatory states ===
State	Signed
Angola	Aug 23, 1978
Chile	Aug 23, 1978
Ivory Coast	Aug 23, 1978
DR Congo	Aug 23, 1978
Holy See	Aug 23, 1978
Madagascar	Aug 23, 1978
Niger	Aug 23, 1978
Pakistan	Jan 10, 1979
Paraguay	Aug 31, 1979
Peru	Aug 30, 1978
Poland	Aug 16, 1979
Senegal	Aug 23, 1978
Sudan	Aug 23, 1978
Uruguay	Aug 23, 1978

== See also ==
- Vienna Convention on the Law of Treaties (1969)
- Vienna Conventions
