= Treaty of Vienna (1657) =

1657 alliance between Austria and Poland–Lithuania

- Type: Offensive alliance
- Signed: 27 May 1657
- Location: Vienna, Archduchy of Austria
- Signatories: Leopold I, Holy Roman Emperor; John II Casimir Vasa
- Parties: House of Habsburg; Polish–Lithuanian Commonwealth

The Treaty of Vienna, concluded on 27 May 1657, was an Austro–Polish alliance during the Second Northern War.

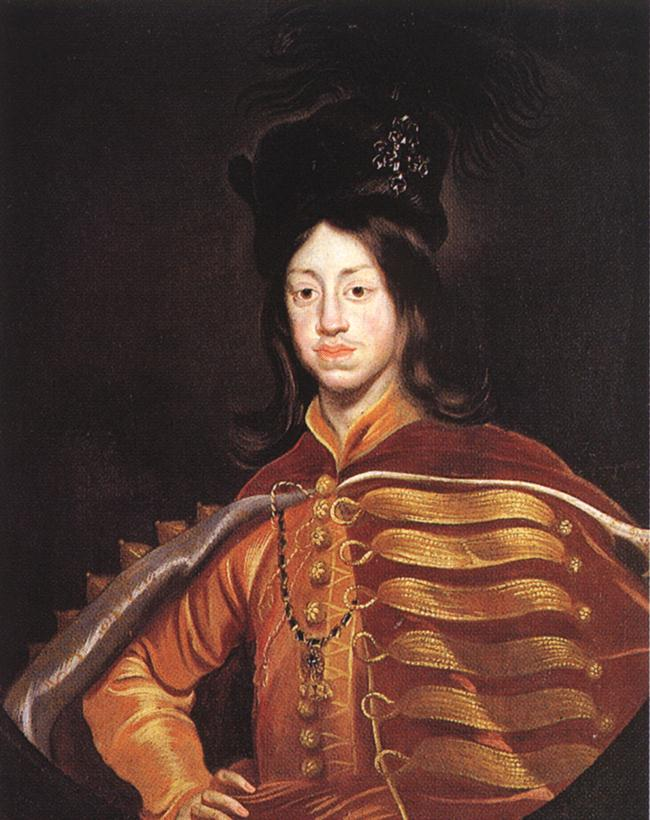
Holy Roman Emperor Leopold I

After Habsburg emperor Ferdinand III had agreed to enter the war on the anti-Swedish side and support the Polish king John II Casimir with 4,000 troops in the ineffective Treaty of Vienna (1656), his death in April 1657 made way for a more substantial treaty with his successor Leopold I. By this treaty, Leopold I promised to aid John II Casimir with 12,000 troops against the Swedish-Brandenburgian alliance. These troops were to be maintained at Polish expense, and crossed the Polish border in June.

== Sources ==
=== Bibliography ===
- Frost, Robert I (2000). The Northern Wars. War, State and Society in Northeastern Europe 1558-1721. Harlow: Longman. ISBN 978-0-582-06429-4.
