= Vienna Award =

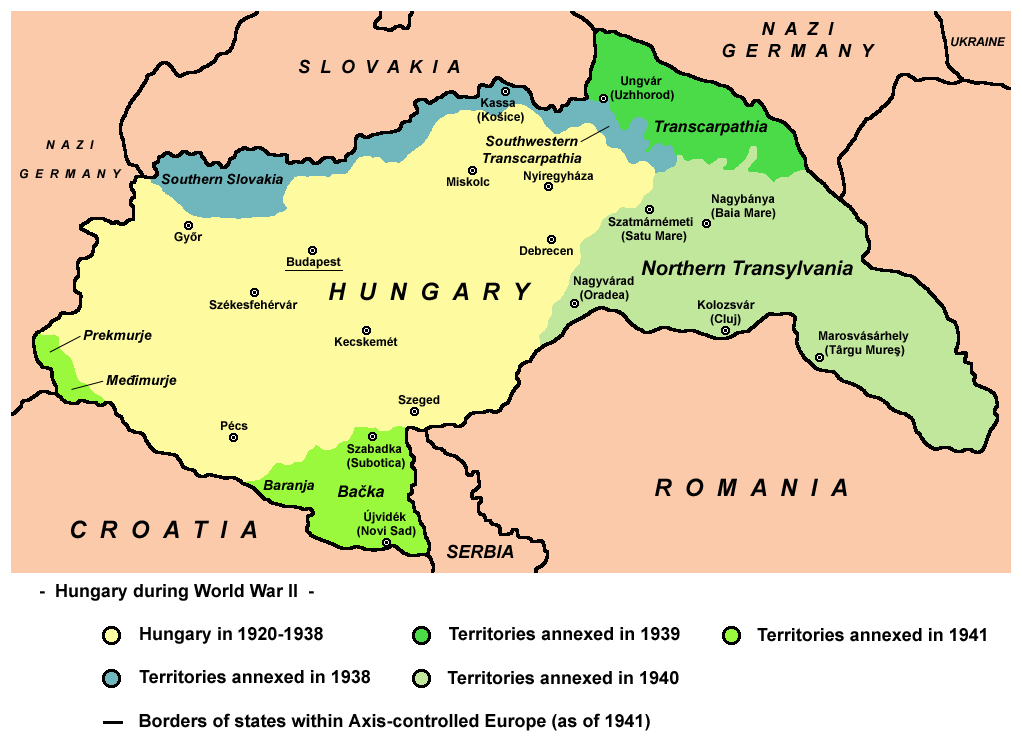

The Vienna Award (also called the Vienna Arbitration or Vienna Diktat) was either of two arbitral decisions made by Nazi Germany and Fascist Italy awarding disputed territory to Hungary. Both decisions were made at the Belvedere Palace, in Vienna, just before and after the Second World War (1939–1945) started.

- First Vienna Award (2 November 1938): Hungary received part of southern Czechoslovakia (now part of modern-day Slovakia). This territorial change was declared null and void in the 1947 Treaty of Paris.
- Second Vienna Award (30 August 1940): Hungary received Northern Transylvania from Romania. This was voided by the Allied Commission in the Armistice Agreement with Romania in 1944.
