= Treaty of Vienna (1656) =

1656 alliance between Austria and Poland–Lithuania

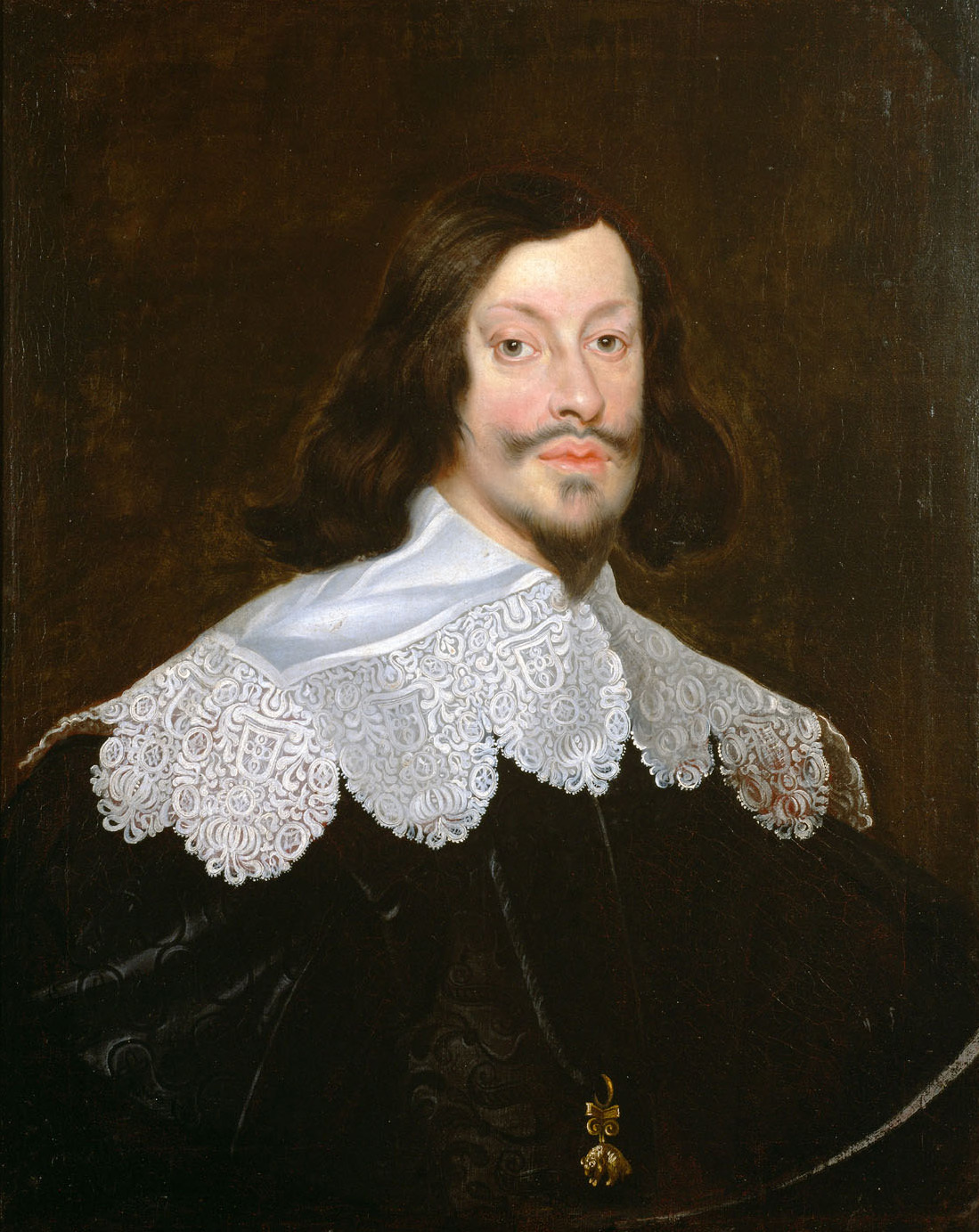
- Ferdinand III, Holy Roman Emperor
- Type: Offensive alliance
- Drafted: 1 December 1656
- Signed: 30 March 1657
- Location: Vienna, Archduchy of Austria
- Signatories: Ferdinand III, Holy Roman Emperor; John II Casimir Vasa
- Parties: House of Habsburg; Polish-Lithuanian Commonwealth

The treaty of Vienna, concluded on 1 December 1656, was an Austro–Polish alliance during the Second Northern War. Habsburg emperor Ferdinand III agreed to enter the war on the anti-Swedish side and support the Polish king John II Casimir with 4,000 troops. The treaty was, however, dissatisfying for John II Casimir, who had hoped for more substantial aid, and further ineffective as Ferdinand III died three days after giving his signature. A similar, but more effective alliance was concluded by Ferdinand III's successor Leopold I in the Treaty of Vienna (1657).
