= Brainin =

Brainin is a Jewish matronymic surname literally meaning "son of Braina", the latter name is one of multiple variants derived from the color "brown". Transliterated from Russian, it may be spelled as Braynin. Notable people with the surname include:

- Michael Brainin (born 24 May 1951) is an Austrian neurologist and emeritus professor
- Norbert Brainin (1923–2005), Austrian/British violinist, the founder of Amadeus Quartet
- Reuben Brainin (1862–1939), Hebrew publicist, biographer and public figure
- Simon Brainin (1854-?), Russian/American physician and public figure
- Sofie Röhr-Brajnin (1861–1937), Polish German soprano opera singer
- Valeri Brainin (1948), Russian/German musicologist, music manager and poet, son of Boris Brainin
