= Valeri Brainin =

Russian composer (born 1948)

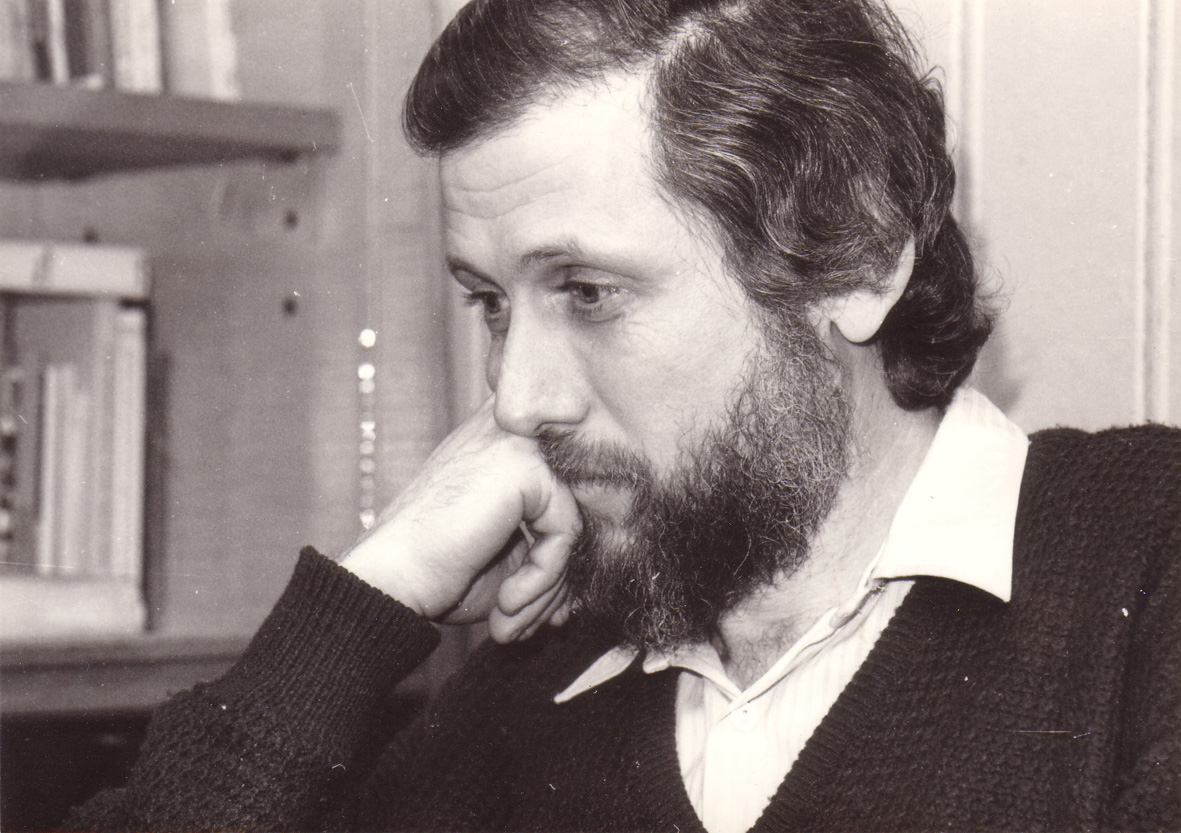
Valeri Brainin

Valeri "Willi" Borisovich Brainin (Russian: Валерий "Вилли" Борисович Брайнин, romanized: Valeri "Villi" Borissovich Brainin, IPA: [vɐˈlʲerʲɪj ˈvʲilʲɪ bɐˈrʲisəvʲɪdʑ ˈbrajnʲɪn]; born 27 January 1948 in Nizhni Tagil), also known as Brainin-Passek (Russian: Брайнин-Пассек, IPA: [ˈbrajnʲɪn ˈpasʲɪk]), is a Russian and German musicologist, music manager, composer, and poet.

Born in the family of Austrian poet, translator and political émigré Boris Brainin (Sepp Österreicher), who belonged to the Viennese Brainin family (his relatives are Hebrew publicist, biographer and public figure Reuben Brainin, Austrian/British violinist Norbert Brainin and others).

== Positions ==
President (from 2004) of the Russian Federation Society for Music Education (RussSME) – National Affiliate of the International Society for Music Education (ISME), a member of UNESCO. Head of the Laboratory of New Technologies in Music Education, Moscow State Pedagogical University. Art Director of Classica Nova International Music Competition. Art Director of the net of Brainin Music Schools (Brainin-Musikschulen), Germany. He has directed seminars/master courses at conservatoires and universities in Austria, Colombia, Germany, Italy, Russia, USA, etc. In addition he offered weekly music talks on Radio Liberty from Munich and Prague, and has literary, critical and scientific musical publications in Russian, German, English, and Italian.

== Music activities ==
Brainin is a full Member of the International Teacher's Training Academy of Science (Moscow), and of other scientific/pedagogical societies. He studied mathematics, linguistics, musical pedagogics, music theory and composition. He has had works performed in the Bolshoi Theatre, Moscow, and taught at Moscow's Gnessin Music School for specially gifted children. The Brainin Teaching Method for ‘development of musical intelligence in children’ became a standard part of the curriculum. He is also a noted piano teacher for children. Among his former students there are some prize-winners of national and international competitions. Brainin is a researcher in microtonal music.

== Literary activities ==
Russian poet (also known as Valeri (Willi) Brainin-Passek), a pupil of Arseny Tarkovsky, a member (1985–1990) of Moscow Club „Poezia“ (ru: Клуб «Поэзия») together with Yuri Arabov, Jewgenij Bunimovitch, Mikhail Epstein, Alexandr Eremenko, Sergey Gandlevsky, Nina Iskrenko, Timur Kibirov, Alexei Parshchikov, Dmitri Prigov, Lev Rubinstein, a. o. Most essential poetry publications:
Russian:
Literary magazines "Znamya" (Moscow), "Novy Mir" (Moscow), "Arion" (Moscow), "Ogoniok" (Moscow), "Grani" (Frankfurt-am-Main), "Dvadtsat dva" (Jerusalem), "Kreshchatik" (Kiev), anthologies "Verses of the Century" (Moscow, compiled by Yevgeny Yevtushenko) and "Verses of the Century-2" (Moscow, compiled by Eugen V. Witkowsky).

- Брайнин-Пассек, В. К нежной варварской речи. Стихотворения. Составитель Михаил Безродный. Предисловие Юрия Арабова. — СПб.: Алетейя, 2009. — 94 c. — (Серия «Русское зарубежье. Коллекция поэзии и прозы»). ISBN 978-5-91419-277-5

English:
Literary magazine "Partisan Review" (1994, No. 2, Boston).
"EastWest" Literary Forum (2023).

== Well-known relatives ==
- Norbert Brainin (1923–2005), Austrian/British violinist, the founder of Amadeus Quartet
- Reuben Brainin (1862–1939), Hebrew publicist, biographer and public figure
