= Leon Kellner =

English lexicographer, grammarian, and Shakespearian scholar

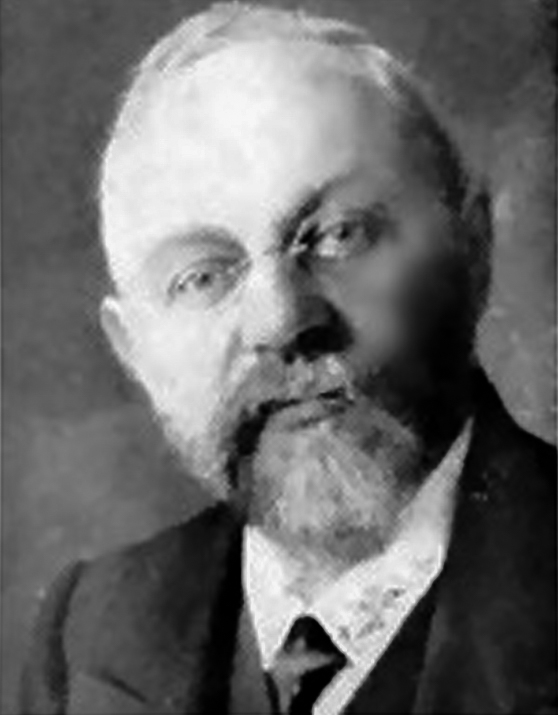
- Leon Kellner
- Born: 17 April 1859; Tarnów, Austrian Empire
- Died: 5 December 1928 (aged 69); Vienna, Austria
- Education: University of Vienna (PhD, 1883)
- Occupations: Grammarian, Shakespearian, Zionist
- Years active: 1890 – 1928
- Notable work: Historical Outlines of English Syntax (London 1892); Restoring Shakespeare (Leipzig 1925)

Leon Kellner (Hebrew: ליאון קלנר; 17 April 1859 – 5 December 1928) was an English lexicographer, grammarian, and Shakespearian scholar. He was also a political activist and a promoter of Zionism.

== Early life and education ==
Leon Kellner was born in Tarnów, Austrian Empire, the son of Jewish grocers Rafael and Lea Kellner. He began to learn the Hebrew alphabet at the age of three, and by five he entered a cheder to study the Torah and the Mishnah.

In 1876, Kellner entered the Jewish Theological Seminary of Breslau, and in 1880 he enrolled at the University of Vienna to study Germanic languages with emphasis on English language and literature.

Kellner was awarded a PhD degree in 1883, and the title of his dissertation, published in 1885, was Zur Syntax des englischen Verbums, mit besonderer Berücksichtigung Shakespeares (The syntax of the English verb, with special consideration of Shakespeare). Kellner travelled to London in 1887 where the Early English Text Society invited him to translate William Caxton's Blanchardyn and Eglantine. Then in 1890 Kellner received his habilitation after publishing a thesis based on original research titled Caxton's Syntax and Style. Kellner dedicated his translation of Caxton and his habilitation thesis to Frederick James Furnivall, founder of the Early English Text Society.

== Academic career ==
After receiving his degree, Kellner taught in various schools until a scholarship sent him to London in 1887 to study at the British Museum. He returned to the University of Vienna in 1890 to lecture in English literature. In 1904 he became a professor of English at the University of Czernowitz, a post he held until 1914 when he fled Czernowitz at the beginning of World War I. After the war, Kellner served as a translator in the office of the President of the Austrian Republic and lectured at the Technical University of Vienna.

During Kellner's lifetime, his work met with mixed sentiments among native English speakers. When Geschichte der Nordamerikanischen Literatur (American Literature) was translated into English by Julia Franklin in 1915, reviewer Ellen Fitz Gerald found many flaws in Kellner's judgments, notably his statement, "We look in vain...for an epic that glorifies...great [American] deeds." In reviewing Restoring Shakespeare, John W. Draper wrote in 1926 that although Kellner's emendations were novel and ingenious, they were unnecessary.

When philologist Jakob Schipper retired from the University of Vienna in 1913, Kellner was considered to be his successor. But the university left the post vacant rather than accept Kellner, an active proponent of Zionism.

== Zionism ==
In 1896 Kellner became a friend and assistant to Theodor Herzl, a political activist and founder of the Zionist Organization. Kellner also became active in the Jüdischnationale Partei or Jewish National Party. He contributed to Herzl's weekly publication, Die Welt, for which he first wrote under his own name and later the pseudonym Leo Rafaels.

Kellner published a two-volume collection of Herzl's writings in 1908, Theodor Herzl's Zionistische Schriften (lit. Theodor Herzl's Zionist Writings), and in 1920 he published Theodor Herzl's Lehrjahre (lit. Theodor Herzl's Apprentice Years).

== Selected works ==
=== Author ===
- Zur Syntax des englischen Verbums, mit besonderer Berücksichtigung Shakespeares (Vienna 1885)
- Caxton's Syntax and Style (London 1890)
- Historical Outlines of English Syntax (London 1892)
- Deutsch-Englisches und Englisch-Deutsches Handwörterbuch (Braunschweig 1902)
- Die englische Literatur im Zeitalter der Königin Victoria (Leipzig 1909)
- Geschichte der Nordamerikanischen Literatur (Berlin 1913)
- Austria of the Austrians and Hungary of the Hungarians (London 1914)
- Theodor Herzls Lehrjahre 1860-1895 (Vienna 1920)
- Die englische Literatur der neuesten Zeit von Dickens bis Shaw (Leipzig 1921)
- Englischen Literatur im Zeitalter der Königin Viktoria (Leipzig 1921)
- Shakespeare Wörterbuch (Leipzig 1922)
- Restoring Shakespeare : a critical analysis of the misreading in Shakespeare's works (Leipzig 1925)

=== Editor ===
- Caxton, Blanchardyn and Eglantine (London 1890)
- Morris, Historical Outlines of English Accidence (London 1892)
- Herzl, Zionistische Schriften (Berlin, 1904)
- Bacon, Essays or Councils Civil and Moral (Leipzig 1919)
