= Karl Samuel Grünhut =

Hungarian-born Jewish Austrian jurist

Karl Samuel Grünhut (August 3, 1844 – October 1, 1929) was Jewish Austrian jurist.

== Life ==
Grünhut was born on August 3, 1844, in Svätý Jur (Szentgyörgy/Yergen), Pozsony County, Hungary, the son of wine merchant Philipp Grünhut.

Grünhut attended the Akademisches Gymnasium in Vienna. He then went to the University of Vienna Law School, graduating from there with a Juris Doctor in 1868. In 1869, he became a private lecturer on commercial and civil law. He became a member of the judiciary examination committee in 1870, serving as its president from 1904 to 1919. In 1872, he became an associate professor at the University of Vienna. From 1874 to 1915, he was a full professor at the university's newly created chair for commercial and bill of exchange law. He served as dean of the faculty of law twice, which raised a sharp protest from anti-Semites. He edited the quarterly Zeitschrift für das Privat- und Oeffentliche Recht der Gegenwart from 1873 to 1916, and wrote several works over the years.

Grünhut had the title "Kaiserlicher Hofrath." In 1897, he became a life-member of the House of Lords. In 1902, he was decorated Commander with Star of the Order of Franz Joseph. In 1909, he received the Commander's Cross of the Order of Leopold.

In 1870, Grünhut married Julia Meisels, who died in 1910. They had three daughters, of which one died in 1911, one died in 1942 in the Theresienstadt Ghetto, and one was killed in 1942 in the Łódź Ghetto. His son-in-law was Rudolf Sieghart. While Grünhut died Jewish, his children were baptized.

Grünhut died in Vienna on October 1, 1929.
