= University of Vienna =

Public university in Vienna, Austria

- Universität Wien
- Latin: Universitas Viennensis / Alma Mater Rudolphina Vindobonensis
- Type: Public
- Established: 12 March 1365; 661 years ago
- Affiliations: CENTRAL, CircleU, Campus Europae; EUA; Guild of European Research-Intensive Universities; UNICA
- Budget: €699.7 million, including €142.7 million for R&D projects (2025/26)
- Rector: Sebastian Schütze
- Academic staff: 7,723
- Administrative staff: 3,043
- Total staff: 11,042 (2025/26)
- Students: 87,107, of whom 62.2% are women (2025/26)
- Postgraduates: 6,190
- Doctoral students: 2,531
- Location: Vienna, Austria; 48°12′47″N 16°21′35″E
- Campus: Urban
- Colors: Blue and white
- Website: univie.ac.at

The University of Vienna (Austrian German: Universität Wien, Austrian German: [univɛrsiˈtɛːt ˈviːn]; Latin: Universitas Viennensis) is a public research university in Vienna, Austria. Founded by Duke Rudolph IV in 1365, it is the oldest university in the German-speaking world and one of the oldest universities in the world in continuous operation. With around 87,000 students and approximately 11,000 employees, it is one of the largest institutions of higher learning in Europe. As of the academic year 2025–2026, the university offered 188 degree programmes.

The University of Vienna is associated with 17 Nobel Prize laureates and has been home to numerous scholars of historical and academic significance, including Erwin Schrödinger, Karl Popper, Stefan Zweig, Friedrich Hayek, Gustav Mahler, Sigmund Freud, Gregor Mendel, Ludwig von Mises, among others.

== History ==
=== Middle Ages to the Enlightenment ===
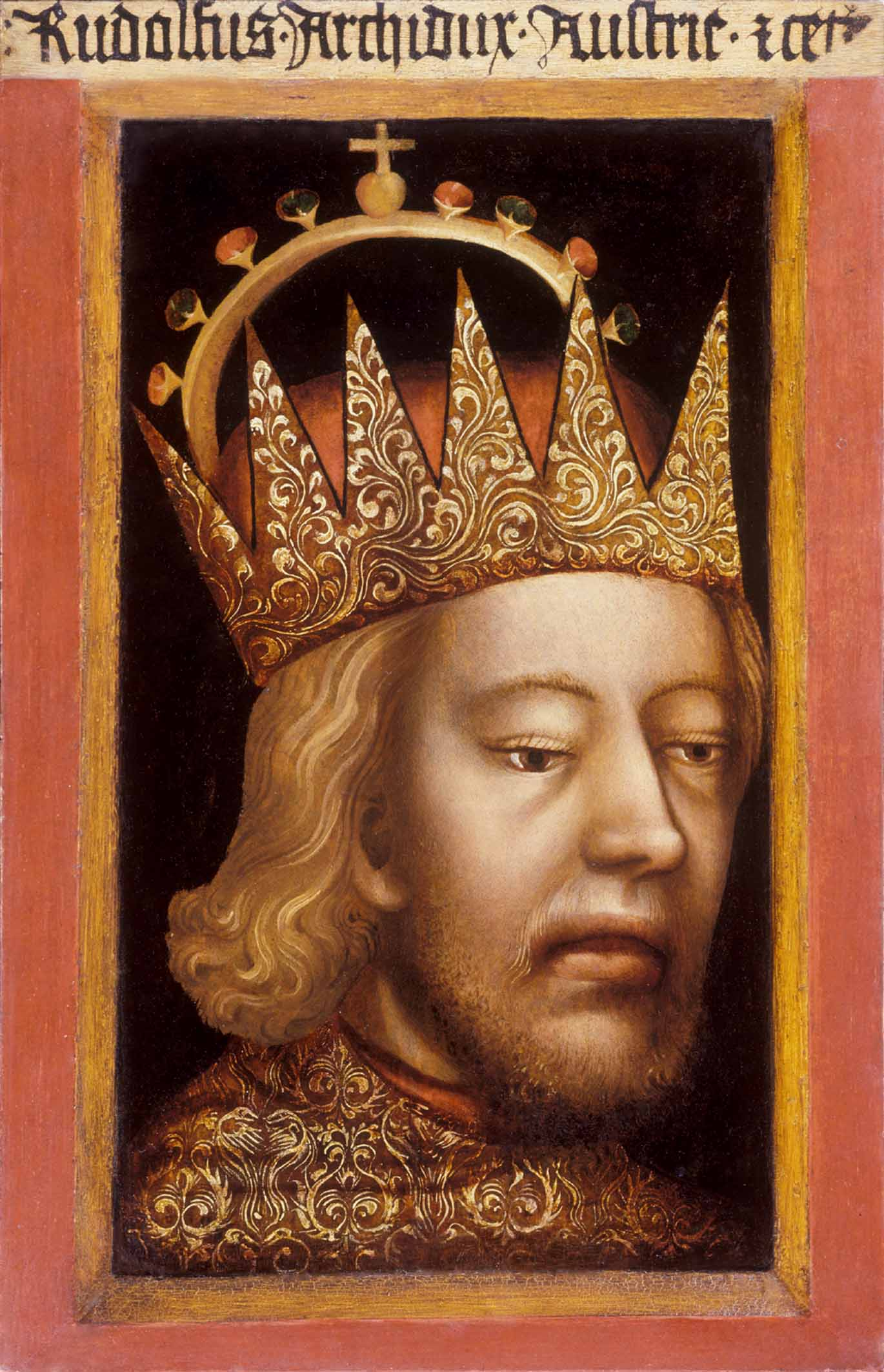
Rudolf IV, Duke of Austria

The university was founded on March 12, 1365, by Rudolf IV, Duke of Austria, hence the name "Alma Mater Rudolphina". After the Charles University in Prague (1347) and Jagiellonian University in Kraków (1364), the University of Vienna is the third oldest university in Central Europe and the oldest university in the contemporary German-speaking world; it remains a question of definition as the Charles University in Prague was German-speaking when founded, too. However, Pope Urban V did not ratify the deed of foundation that had been sanctioned by Rudolf IV, specifically in relation to the department of theology. This was presumably due to pressure exerted by Charles IV, Holy Roman Emperor, who wished to avoid competition for the Charles University in Prague.

The pope later granted an endowment to the university in 1365, while papal assent was finally received in 1384. This led to the University of Vienna and its Faculty of Catholic Theology being granted the status of a full university. The first university building opened in 1385. It grew into the biggest university of the Holy Roman Empire, and during the advent of Humanism in the mid-15th century was home to more than 6,000 students.

In its early years, the university had a partly hierarchical, partly cooperative structure, in which the Rector was at the top, while the students had little say and were settled at the bottom. The Magister and Doctors constituted the four faculties and elected the academic officials from amidst their ranks. The students, but also all other Supposita (university members), were divided into four Academic Nations. Their elected board members, mostly graduates themselves, had the right to elect the Rector. He presided over the Consistory which included procurators of each of the nations and the faculty deans, as well as over the University Assembly, in which all university teachers participated. Complaints or appeals against decisions of the faculty by the students had to be brought forward by a Magister or Doctor.

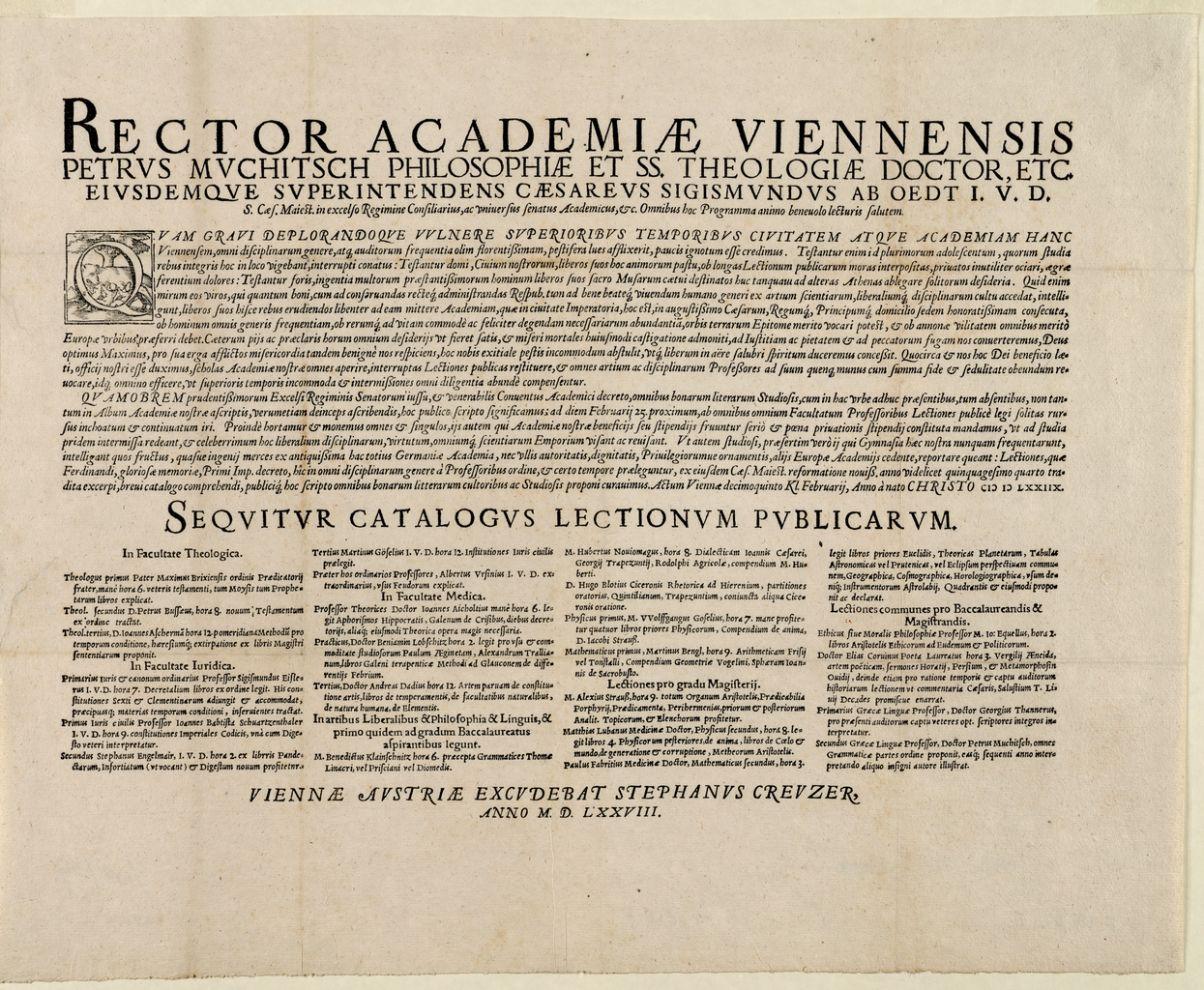
Opening proclamation prior to 1578 academic term

Being considered a Papal Institution, the university suffered a setback during the Reformation. In addition, epidemics, economic stagnation, and the first Siege of Vienna by Ottoman forces had devastating effects on the city, leading to a sharp decline in enrollment. For Emperor Ferdinand I, this meant that the university should be tied to the church to an even stronger degree, and in 1551 he installed the Jesuit Order there. As time went on, conflicts between the Jesuit school and the university arose. This led Emperor Ferdinand II, in 1623, to pass a law that incorporated the Jesuit College into the university.

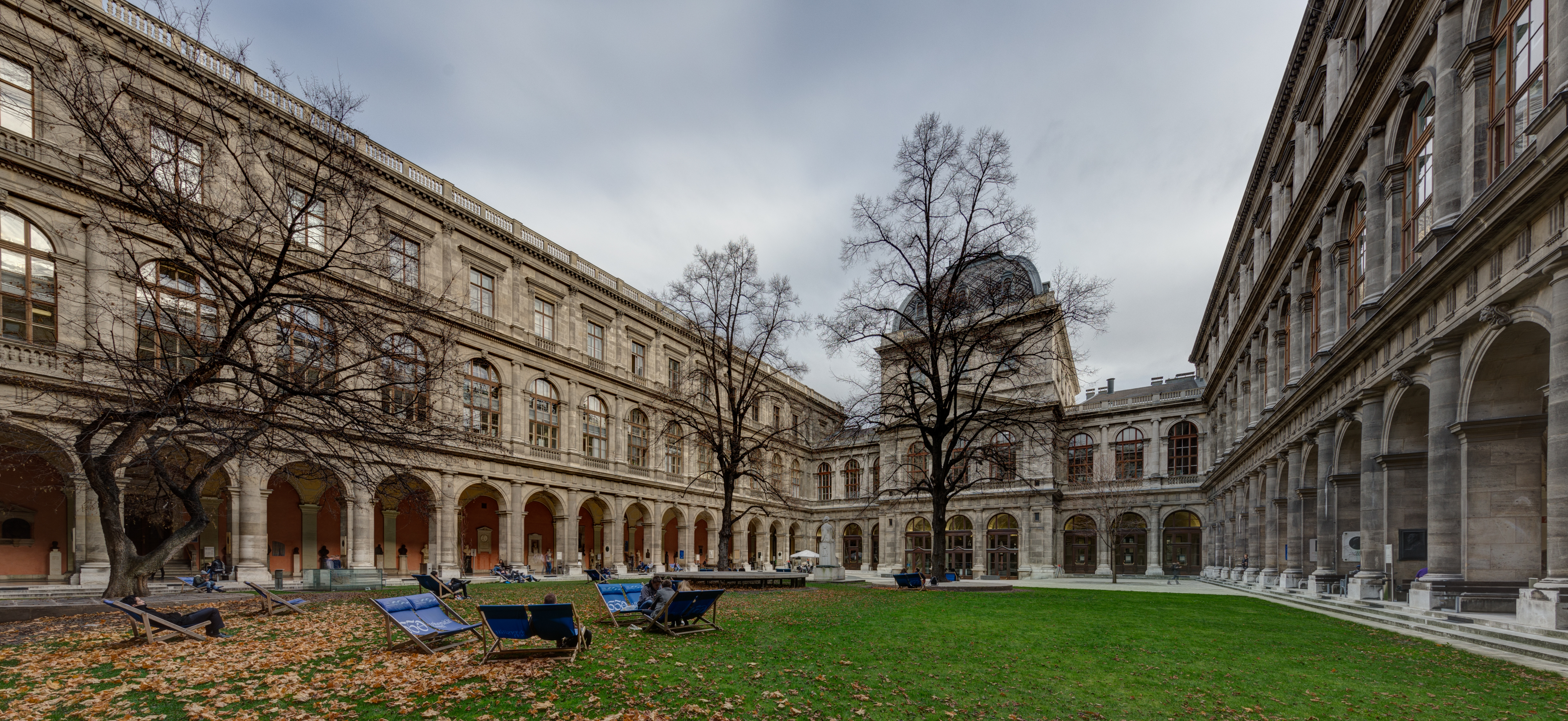
The courtyard (Arkadenhof) of the main building, constructed between 1877 and 1884

It was only in the mid-18th century that the Jesuits lost influence over the university and when Empress Maria Theresa ensured that the university went under the control of the monarchy. The university would later focus on the education of physicians and civil servants. Her successor Joseph II continued her reforms and further liberalized the university, abolishing official attire and allowing both Protestants and Jews to enroll by 1782, as well as introducing German as the compulsory language of instruction the year later.

=== Modern history ===
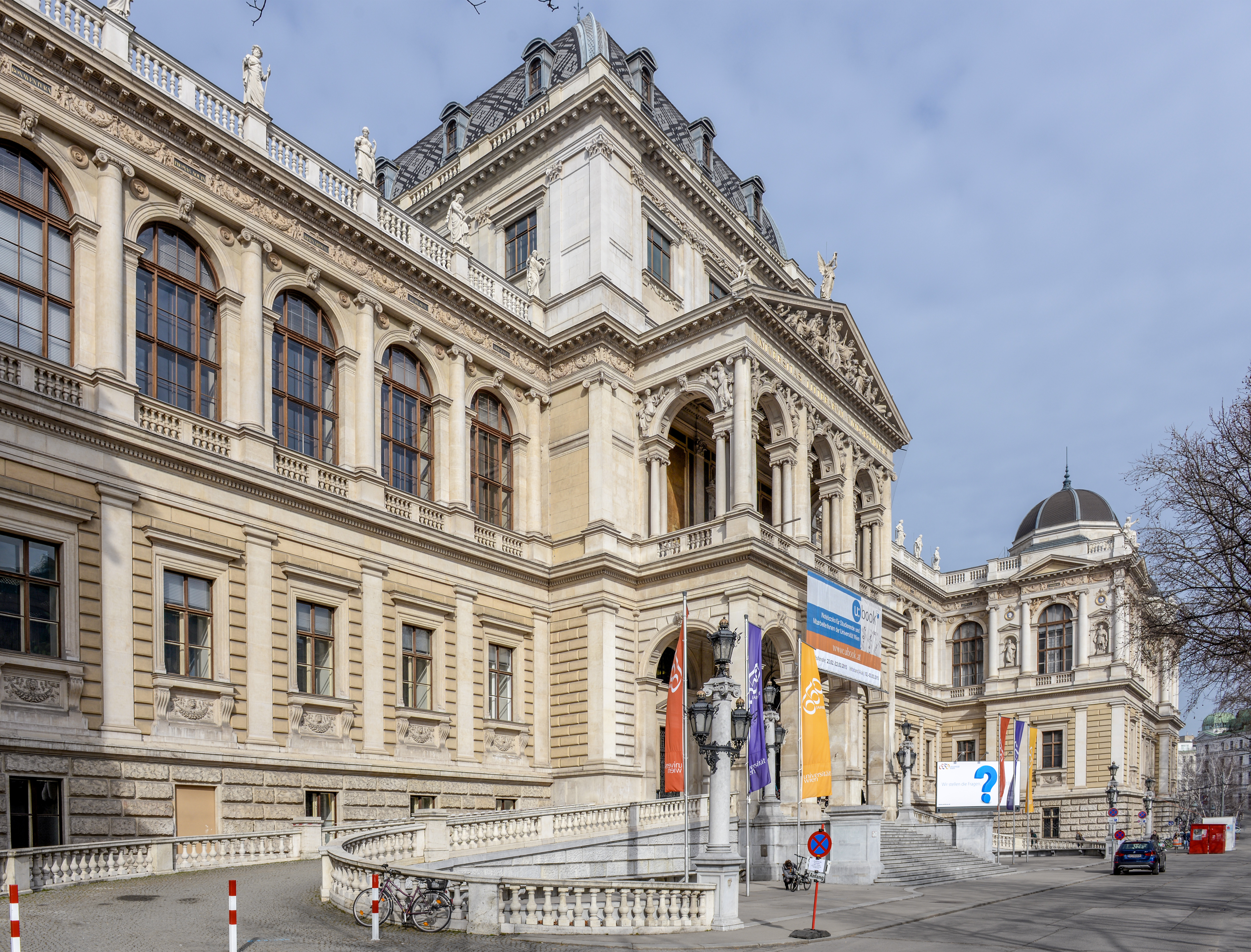
Exterior facade of the main building

Significant changes were instituted in the wake of the Revolution in 1848, with the Philosophical Faculty being upgraded into equal status as Theology, Law and Medicine. Led by the reforms of Leopold, Count von Thun und Hohenstein, the university was able to achieve a larger degree of academic freedom. The current main building on the Ringstraße was built between 1877 and 1884 by Heinrich von Ferstel. The previous main building was located close to the Stuben Gate (Stubentor) on Iganz Seipel Square, the current home of the old University Church (Universitätskirche) and the Austrian Academy of Sciences (Österreichische Akademie der Wissenschaften).

Women were admitted as full students in 1897, although their studies were limited to Philosophy. The remaining departments gradually followed suit, although with considerable delay: Medicine in 1900, Law in 1919, Protestant Theology in 1923, and finally Roman Catholic Theology in 1946. Ten years after the admission of the first female students, Elise Richter became the first woman to receive habilitation, becoming professor of Romance languages in 1907; she was also the first female distinguished professor.

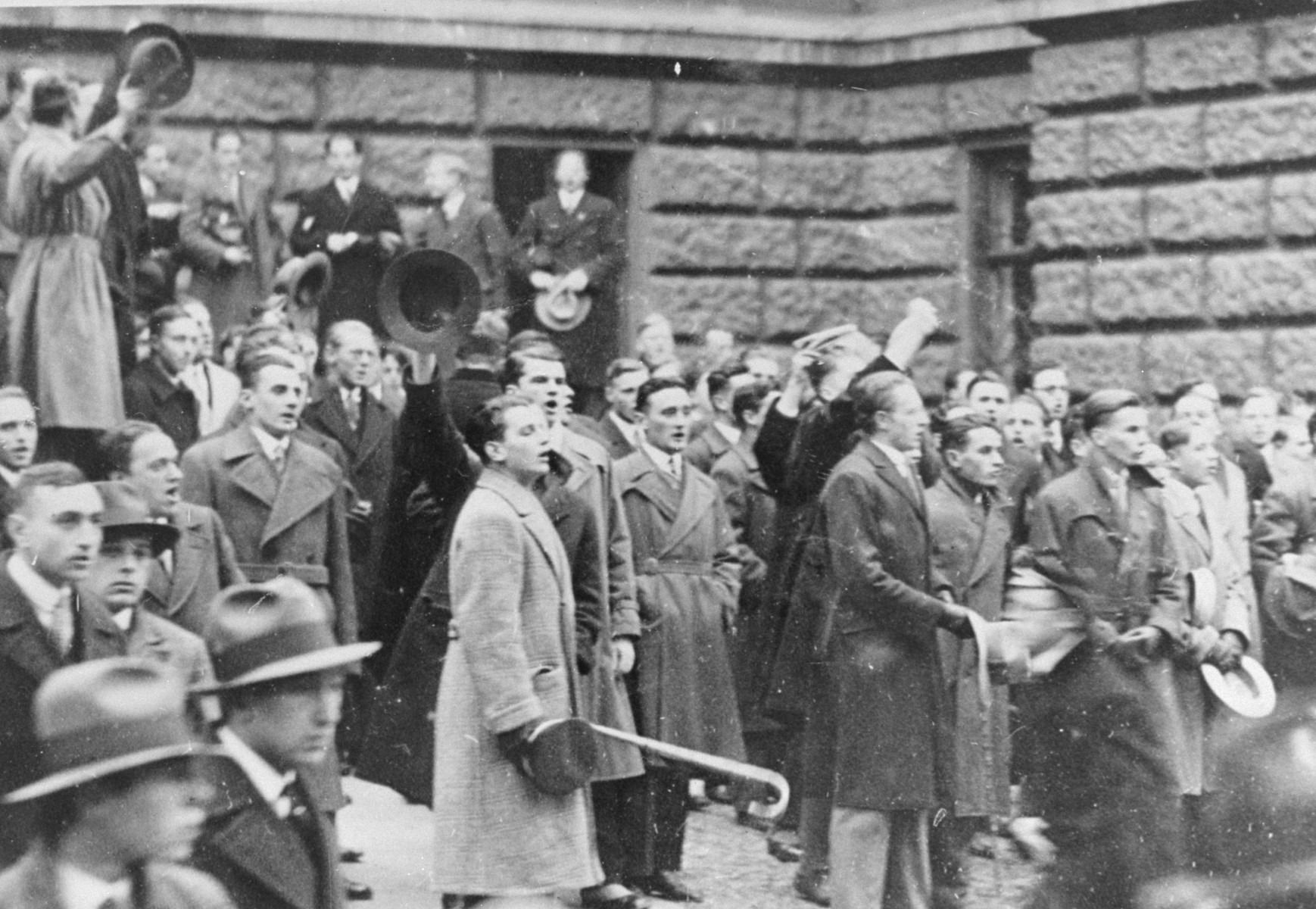
Students riot at the University of Vienna after a Nazi attempt to prevent Jews from entering the university (c. 1938)

In the late 1920s, the university was in steady turmoil because of anti-democratic and anti-Semitic activity by parts of the student body. Professor Moritz Schlick was killed by a former student while ascending the steps of the university for a class. His murderer was later released by the Nazi regime. Following the Anschluss, the annexation of Austria into Greater Germany by the Nazi regime, in 1938 the University of Vienna was reformed under political aspects, and a huge number of teachers and students were dismissed for political and "racial" reasons.

In April 1945, the then 22-year-old Kurt Schubert, later acknowledged doyen of Judaic Studies at the University of Vienna, was permitted by the Soviet occupation forces to open the university again for teaching, which is why he is regarded as the unofficial first rector in the post-war period. On 25 April 1945, however, the constitutional lawyer Ludwig Adamovich senior was elected as the official rector of the University of Vienna.

A large degree of participation by students and university staff was realized in 1975, however, the University Reforms of 1993 and 2002 largely re-established the professors as the main decision-makers. However, also as part of the 2002 reform, the university, after more than 250 years of being largely under governmental control, finally regained its full legal capacity. The number of faculties and centers was increased to 18, and the whole of the medical faculty was separated into the new Medical University of Vienna.

=== 21st century ===
On 22 October 2009, following a solidarity rally for the occupiers of the Academy of Fine Arts Vienna, the Audimax, Austria's largest lecture hall (opened in 1936), was occupied (see Student protests in Austria in 2009). The protests were directed (among other things) against the implementation of the Bologna Process in Austria, the reintroduction of tuition fees, restrictions on access to higher education, and precarious working conditions at universities. They demanded an increase in the higher education budget to 2% of GDP in order to expand personnel and spatial capacities and improve university facilities, as well as education and curriculum design independent of private economic interests.

In 2015, the Vienna Philharmonic Orchestra dedicated part of the programme of its New Year's Concert to the University of Vienna on the occasion of its 650th anniversary on 12 March 2015. With a view to implementing the new teacher education programme, regional development associations have been formed in Austria. The University of Vienna, together with other universities in Vienna and Lower Austria, belongs to the North-East Association. The new teacher education programme for secondary education began in 2016.

In 2020, the University of Vienna opened a new location on Kolingasse to expand its infrastructure. In October 2021, the new University of Vienna Biology Building was opened. In October 2022, Sebastian Schütze was elected Rector of the University of Vienna and took office. In October 2022, a new Rectorate took office at the University of Vienna. In October 2022, the University of Vienna congratulated Nobel Prize winner Anton Zeilinger for his outstanding scientific achievements. In May 2025, the University of Vienna opened a new book depository, relocating 2.7 million volumes from the Main Library in the Main Building of the University of Vienna. In the last elections for the Austrian National Union of Students (ÖH) in May 2025, the VSStÖ student organisation achieved 37.01% (12 seats) in the university representation, GRAS achieved 20.87% (6 seats) and KSV-LiLi achieved 11.00% (3 seats). In October 2025, the University of Vienna achieved a place in the top 100 of the global university rankings for the first time.

== Campus ==
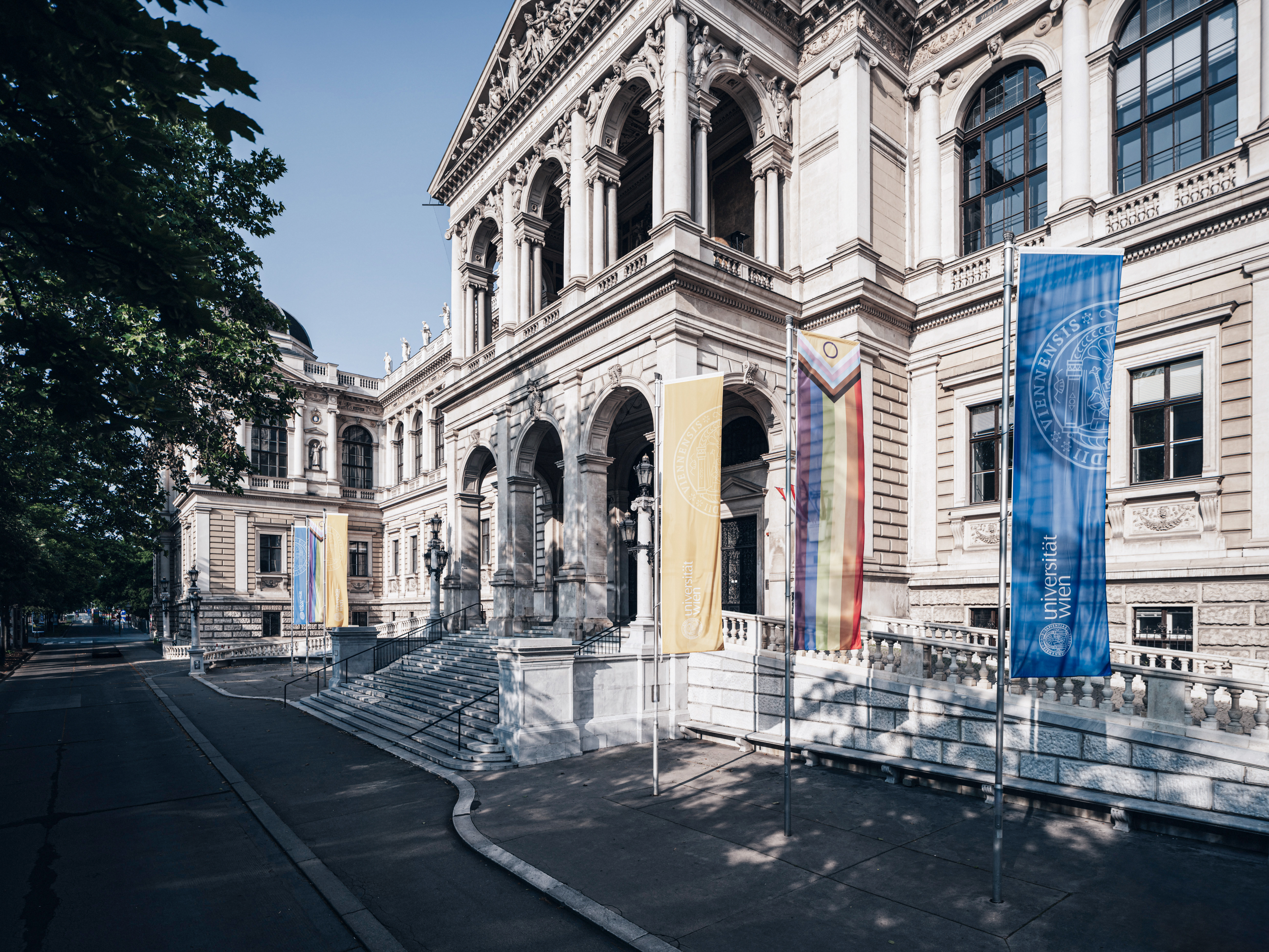
Main building of the University of Vienna (2025)

The University of Vienna does not operate from a single, unified campus. Historically, the university's activities were centred in the city centre. Today, its academic facilities are distributed across Vienna. The university's main building on the Ringstraße serves as its symbolic and administrative centre and is commonly referred to as the Hauptuni (main building). The Main Building houses the Rectorate, most of the deaneries, the central service units, the Main Library, a few departments with their specialist libraries and numerous lecture halls.

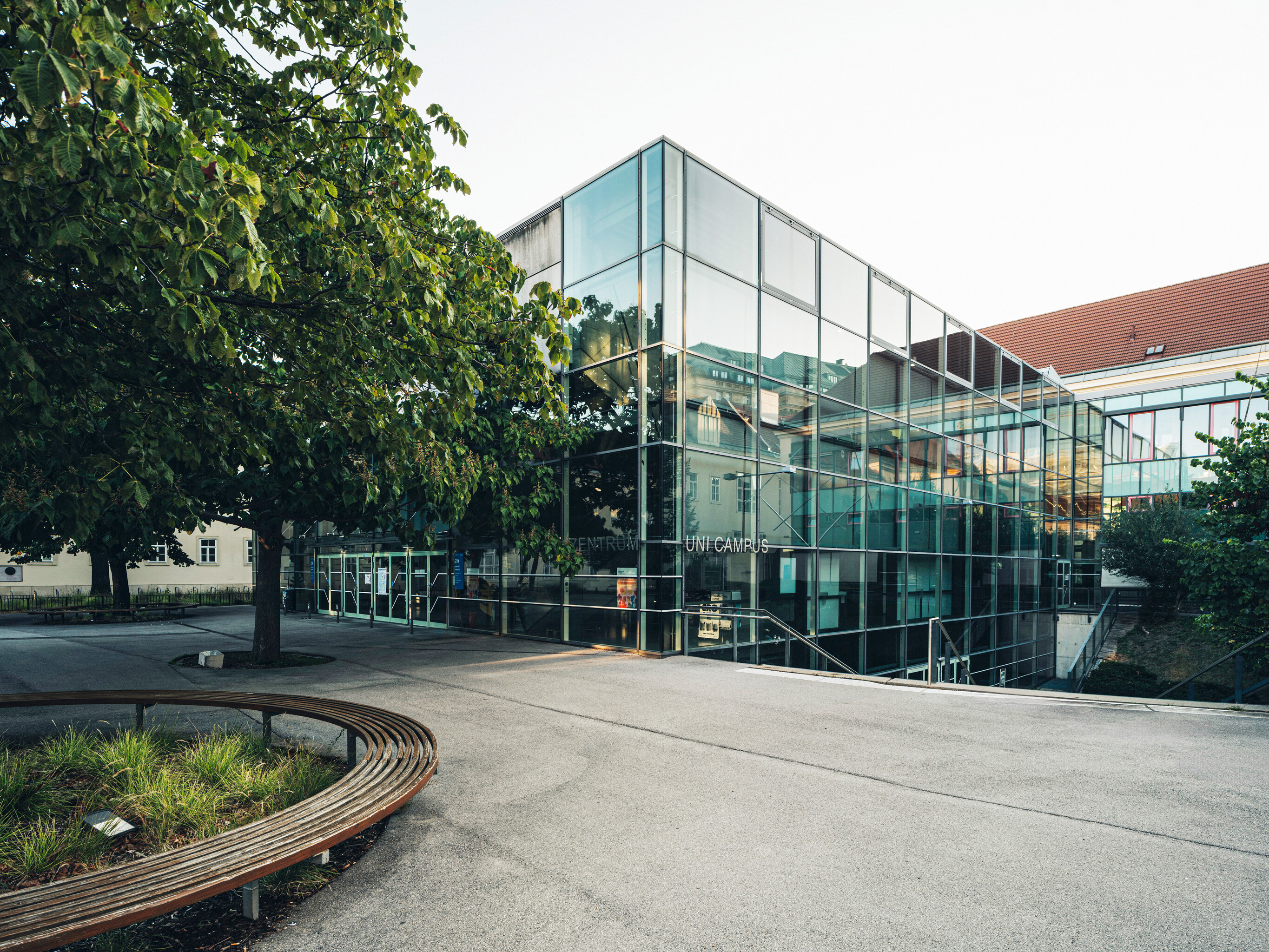
The Campus of the University of Vienna (2025)

The Campus of the University of Vienna was opened in 1998 and was created by converting the old general hospital. It houses a large number of departments and specialist libraries. The University of Vienna does not have one single campus. The remaining facilities of the University of Vienna are spread across more than 60 locations in Vienna and other federal states.

Nearby facilities include the Neues Institutsgebäude (New Institute Building, NIG), located directly behind the main building. Other important locations of the University are the Max Perutz Labs Vienna, the University Centre Althanstraße, the University Vienna Biology Building (UBB), the Faculty of Economics and the Faculty of Mathematics at Oskar Morgenstern Platz.

Since 2004, the Medical University of Vienna has been an independent university; before, it was part of the University of Vienna as a medical faculty.

== Library ==
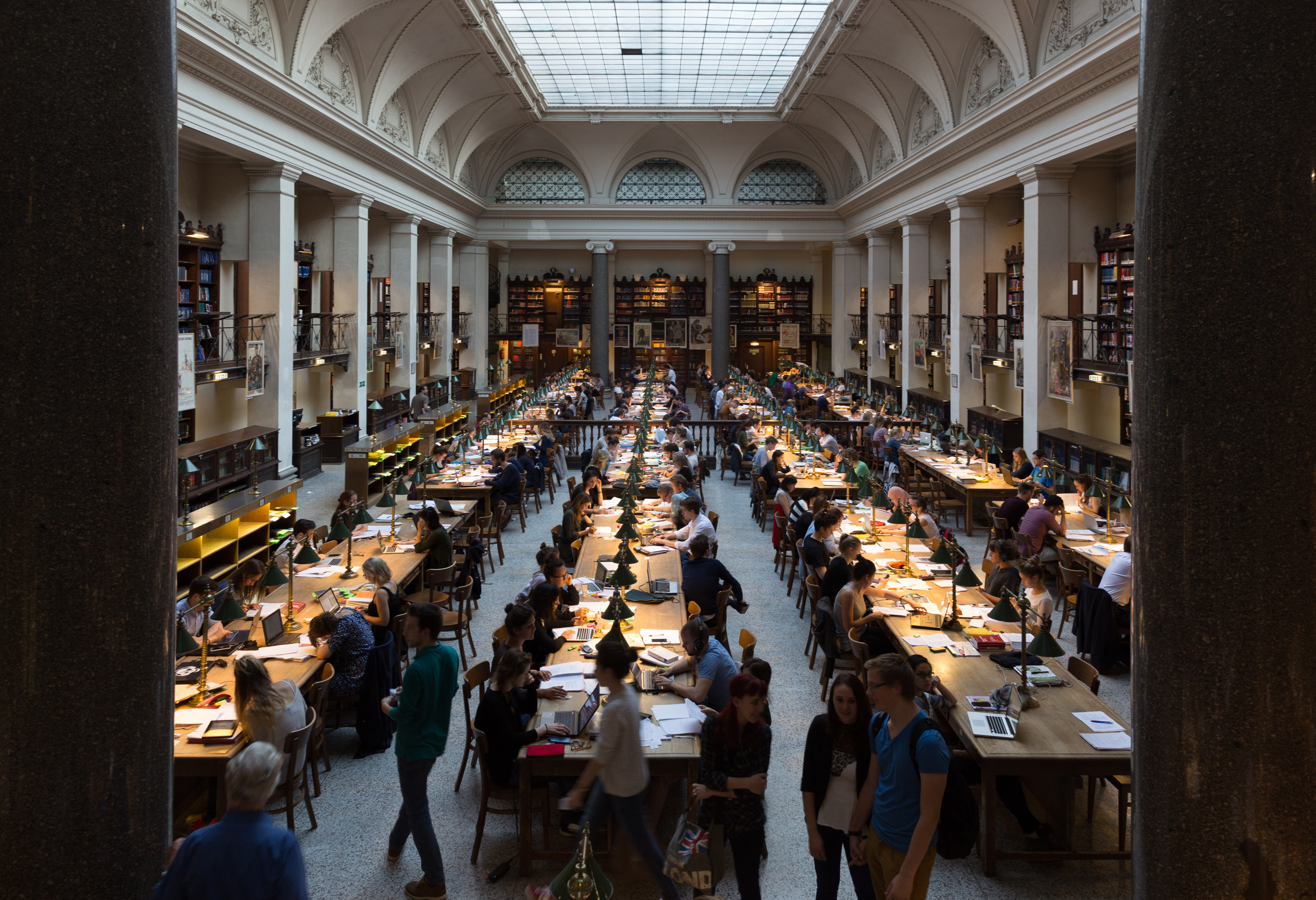
The reading room in the university's main library

The Vienna University Library is the oldest university library in the German-speaking world (founded in 1365) and comprises the Main Library and the 33 departmental libraries at various university locations throughout Vienna. The library's primary responsibility is to the members of the university; however, it is publicly accessible. Use of the books in the reading halls is open to all persons without the need for identification, which is only required for checking out books or other media. The library's website provides direct access to information such as electronic journals, online indices, and databases.

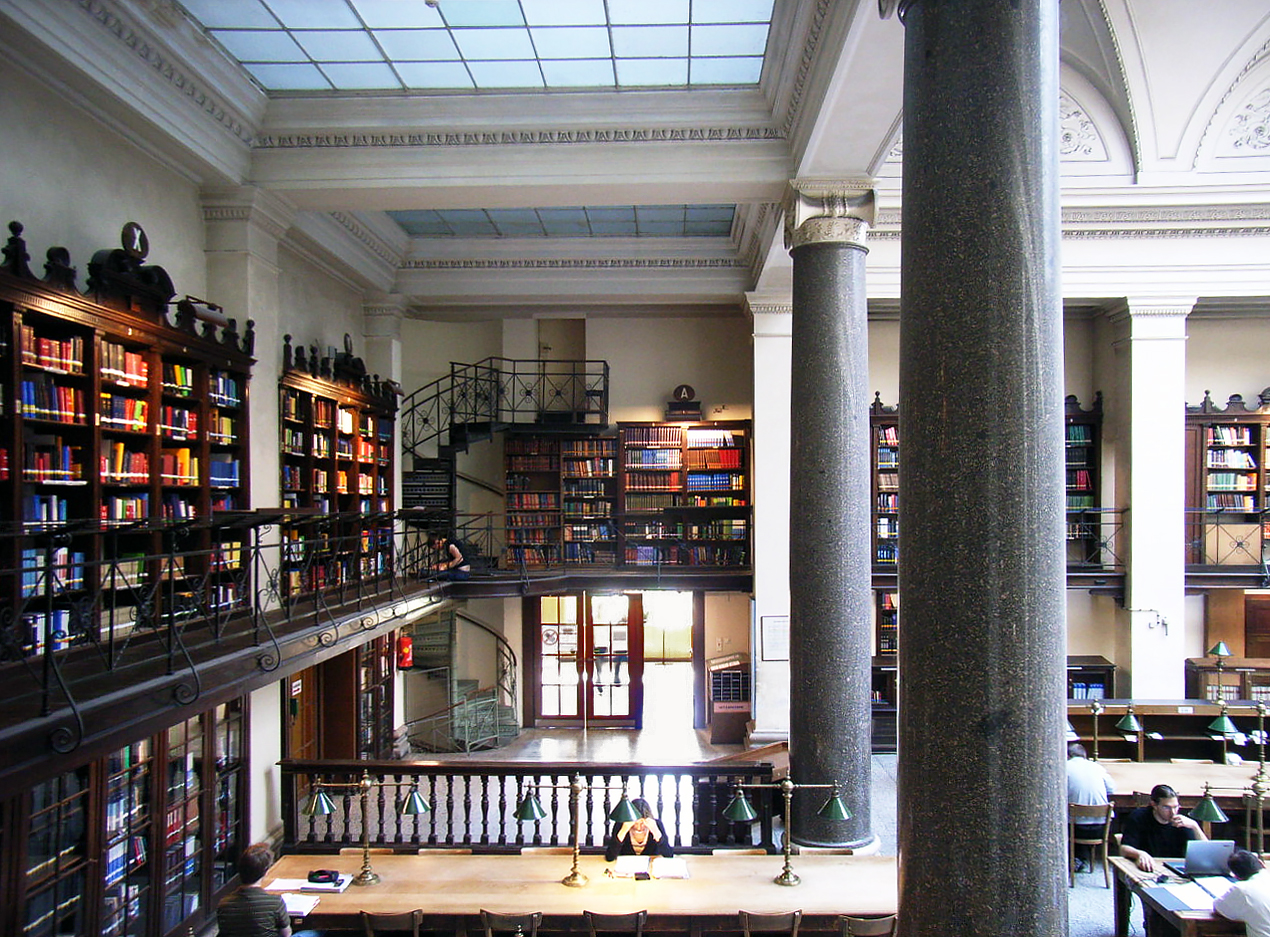
Entrance to the large reading room

Rudolf IV had already provided for a publica libraria in the Foundation Deed of 12 March 1365, where the valuable books bequeathed by deceased members of the university should be collected. Through many legacies, this collection was subsequently greatly increased and became the basis of the old Libreye that was accommodated in the same building as the student infirmary. In addition, there were libraries in the separate Faculties and in the Duke's College.

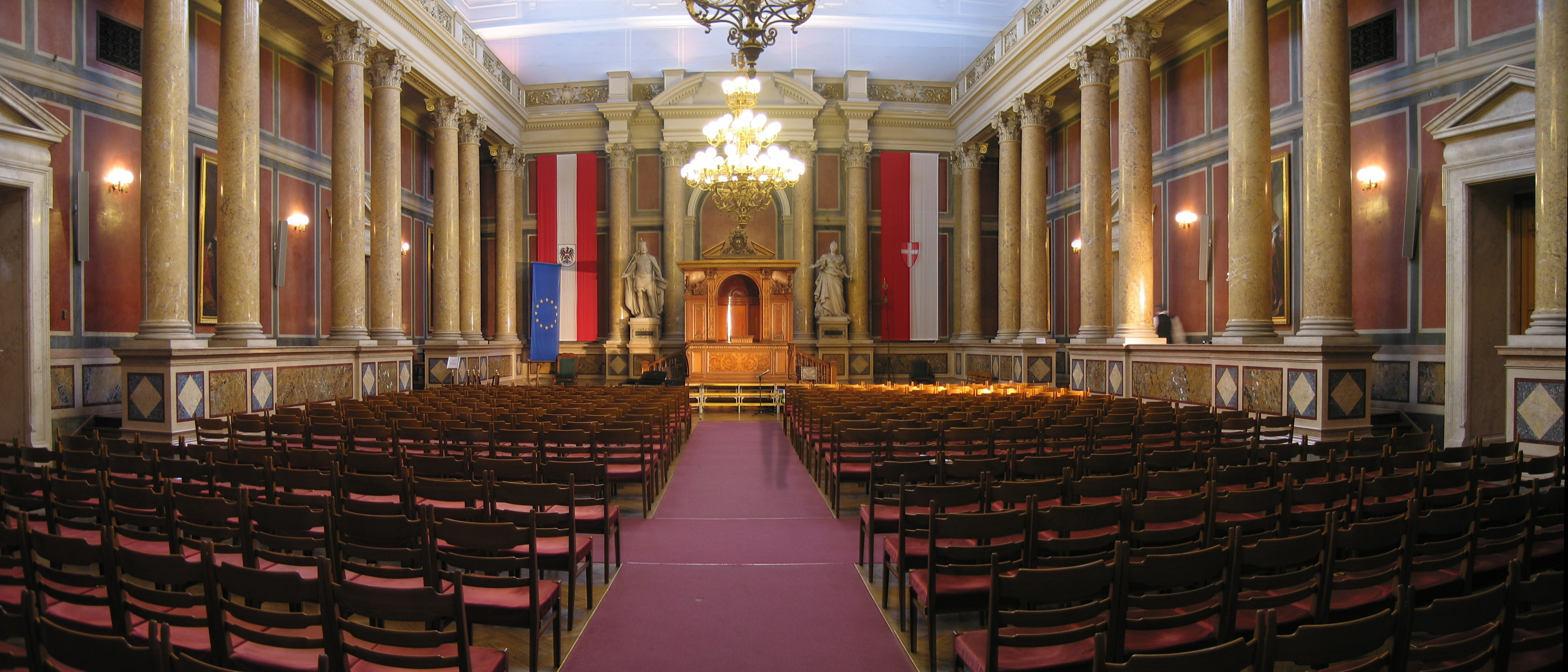
Main Ceremonial Chamber (Festsaal) in the Main Building

From the 17th century onwards, interest in the old library, with its manuscripts and incunabulae, went into decline and the modern library in the Jesuit College came to the fore. In 1756, the oldest university library was finally closed down and its books, 2,787 volumes, were incorporated into the Court Library, of which Gerard van Swieten was then director. After the dissolution of the Jesuit order (1773), the new "Academic Library" was created out of the book collections of the five Lower Austrian Colleges and many duplicates from the Court Library. This was opened on 13 May 1777, the birthday of Maria Theresa of Austria, in the building of the Academic College. Initially, the stock consisted of some 45,000 books, and during Emperor Joseph II's dissolution of the monasteries, this was soon considerably extended. In contrast to its antecedents, the new library was open to the general public. Between 1827 and 1829, it acquired the classicist extension (Postgasse 9) to the Academic College, in which it was to be accommodated until 1884. In that year, the main library, with some 300,000 books, moved to Heinrich von Ferstel's new Main Building on the Ring, where stacks for some 500,000 volumes had already been prepared. With an annual growth of up to 30,000 volumes, the surplus space was soon filled. Book storage space had to be extended continuously. One hundred years later, the complete library, including departmental and subject libraries, comprised more than 4.3 million volumes.

By 2026, the University Library of the University of Vienna comprises the Main Library and the 33 specialist libraries at various university locations throughout Vienna and is the largest library in Austria (approximately 7.8 million volumes). In addition to contemporary scientific literature, it has an exceptional collection of historical works. The specialist libraries contain approximately 4.9 million books, journals, maps and other materials. The University Library also comprises the Archive of the University of Vienna at Postgasse 9 in the 1st district, which manages the documents relating to university operations. The library's primary responsibility is to the members of the university; however, the library also provides access to the public. Use of the books in the reading halls is open to all persons without the need for identification, which is only required for checking out books or other media. The library's website provides direct access to information such as electronic journals, online indices, and databases.

Statistics (2025)
Book inventory	7,839,311 (of which 2,949,481 belong to the Main Library)
E-Journals	169,716
E-Books	2,228,718
Search queries in the online catalogue	11,050,182
Items borrowed	2,791,593
Oldest book	Bible from the Dorothean monastery, 1392 ("Biblia manuscripta"; entry in the online catalogue: https://ubdata.univie.ac.at/AC16383568)

== Organization ==
The University of Vienna, like all universities and academies in Austria, once featured a system of democratic representation. Power in the university was divided equally among three groups: students (the largest group), junior faculty, and full professors. All groups had the right to send representatives to boards, who then voted on almost every issue. From 2002 on, the government of Austria, headed by chancellor Wolfgang Schüssel, reformed the university system, transforming the institutions into legal entities, but also concentrating power in the hands of the full professors.

The reform also introduced a board of governors and tuition fees. In 2013, those amounted to about €381 per semester for students from Austria, the European Union as well as some non-EU countries, while students from developed non-EU countries usually pay double that amount. The reforms also separated the medical departments into separate medical schools, such as the Medical University of Vienna.

=== Management ===
The main bodies of the university are the Rectorate, the University Council, the Senate and the Scientific Advisory Board (SAB). There are 15 faculties and five centres, as well as a large number of other organisational units that support the administrative and academic tasks of the University.

- Rectorate: Is responsible for the strategic direction of the University and consists of the Rector and four Vice-Rectors.
- University Council: Alongside the Rectorate and the Senate, this is one of the highest governing bodies and consists of nine members who are appointed for a term of five years.
- Senate: This is another central governing body of the University of Vienna and consists of 18 members.
- Scientific Advisory Board (SAB): Supports the University in relation to international scientific developments and long-term strategic decisions.

=== Programmes ===
Students at the University of Vienna can select from 185 degree programmes. In the academic year 2024/25, the University awarded 4,106 first degrees (bachelor's and diploma degrees), 1,841 master's degrees, and 242 doctoral and PhD degrees.The University of Vienna offers degree programmes in various disciplines, which are offered as the bachelor's and diploma programmes, master's and teacher education programmes, and doctoral programmes and PhD programmes

=== Faculties and centres ===
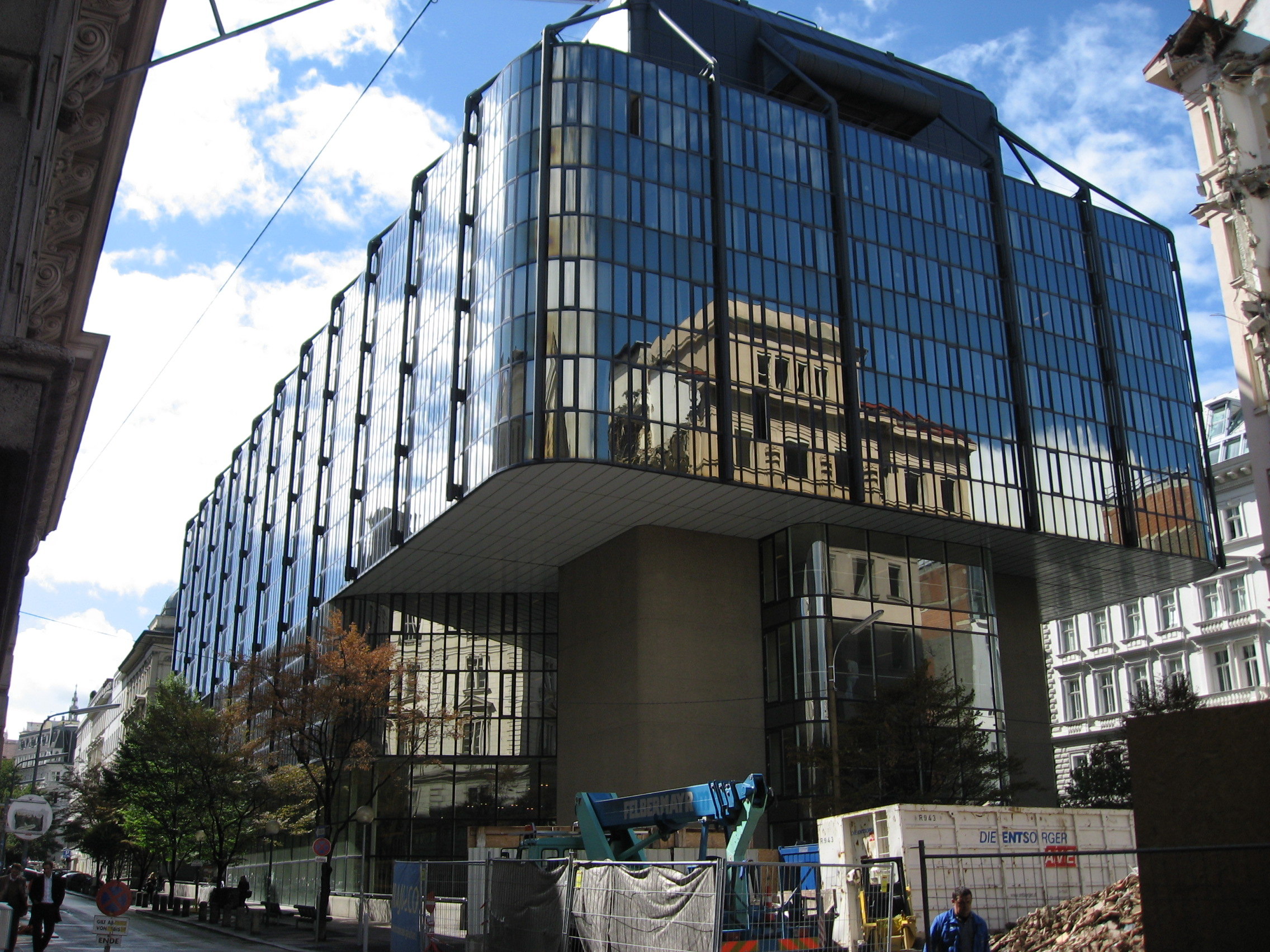
Faculty of Law

The University of Vienna consists of 15 faculties and 5 centers:

1. Faculty of Catholic Theology
2. Faculty of Protestant Theology
3. Faculty of Law
4. Faculty of Business, Economics and Statistics (not to be confused with the Vienna University of Economics and Business)
5. Faculty of Computer science
6. Faculty of Historical and Cultural Studies
7. Faculty of Philological and Cultural Studies
8. Faculty of Philosophy and Education
9. Faculty of Psychology
10. Faculty of Social sciences
11. Faculty of Mathematics
12. Faculty of Physics
13. Faculty of Chemistry
14. Faculty of Earth Sciences, Geography and Astronomy
15. Faculty of Life sciences
16. Centre for Translation studies
17. Centre for Sport science and University Sports
18. Max Perutz Labs
19. Centre for Microbiology and Environmental Systems Science
20. Centre for Teacher Education

==== Department of English and American Studies ====
The Department of English and American Studies, formerly the Department of English, sits within the Faculty of Philological and Cultural Studies at Vienna University. In 1876, Jakob Schipper, professor of modern languages, held the chair of English Philology, thereby making Vienna the third university in German-speaking countries having introduced such position in English Philology. The significance of English philology increased, because there was a practical need to teach English, which was on the way to acquire the status of lingua franca in international political and economical relations. Therefore, the number of students increased. In 1927, there were 324 students in English literature lecture. In 1928, the lecture on historical grammar was attended by 462 students.,

The historical events of 1938, when Austria became part of National Socialist Germany, influenced University life to a great extent. Many professors were dismissed and replaced due to political reasons and antisemitism. The study programmes were changed, shifting their focus to satisfy the interests of the new regime. Students of modern languages were trained to become either teachers or interpreters before they could take PhD exams. Future teachers had to pass many obligatory courses such as practical language classes, lectures on literature and cultural studies, phonetics, general linguistics, British and North American studies, and sometimes historical linguistics. As for the content of the subjects, the practical skills and cultural studies were of greater importance. In addition, the party was interested in training the experts on US culture to know their rivals better. After the fall of Nazi regime, there was a process of denazification, based on the Verbotsgesetz (8 May 1945), which was aimed on dismissal of former NSDAP members. After the World War II, the University required considerable reconstruction which was completed in 1951.

In 1975, with the introduction of University Organisational Law, there was a democratisation of the university. Professors, readers, lecturers and students could take part in the process of making decision. The administrative structure of the whole university was changed. The expeditious advance in all areas of study facilitated a considerable increase in the number of subjects. Especially, since 1970 the number of students has multiplied every decade. This led to a progressive paucity of space and necessity for relocation. In 1988, the City Council donated the old building of the General Hospital to the University, which became Vienna University Campus, used by the Faculty of Humanities, which now consists of 15 departments. It took 10 years of reforms to adapt the old hospital for an educational use.

Views or VIENNA ENGLISH WORKING PAPERS is an online academic journal established by the English department of university Vienna in 1992. It was launched in order to create an active linguistic community. Its sole interest is the exchange of ideas between the Viennese scholars and the linguists from all over the world. The department staff wants their project to reflect their interest in open discussions rather than well-finished papers. "When we called our working papers VIEWS, this was meant to be an operative word, reflecting the intention to produce not so much finished papers as comments and opinions open-ended enough to provide a forum for discussion". This project in fact came from a personal motivation. The staff was fed-up with their complacency. Each one of them was only interested in his study branch; no one of them dares to investigate a different branch even it belongs to the same field. "It was easy, then, to slip into the error of thinking that we didn't have anything to say to and learn from each other. Why should a sociolinguist quarrel with a semanticist, what does the phonologist have to do with the discourse analyst, why should the historical philologist talk to the syntactitian?"

=== Research facilities ===
The University of Vienna has a large number of research facilities that promote and intensify academic research in a wide variety of fields. Key elements include research networks, research platforms and collaborations with other universities and research institutions.

=== International ===
The University of Vienna is part of an international network of research institutions and universities and maintains numerous collaborations and networks worldwide. The University of Vienna also maintains numerous strategic partnerships with international universities and research institutions that support academic exchange and joint research initiatives. Partner universities include the University of Chicago, Kyoto University and Peking University. In addition, the University of Vienna is involved in many international networks and networks and associations, which strengthen its global connections and enable active participation in international research and education initiatives. These international networks include CENTRAL, CircleU, Campus Europae, EUA, Guild of European Research-Intensive Universities, and UNICA.

== Academic reputation ==
University rankings

Global – Overall
- ARWU World: 101-150 (2025)
- QS World: 152 (2026)
- THE World: 95 (2026)
- USNWR Global: 212 (2025)

National – Overall
- USNWR National: 2 (2025)

In the THE ranking for 2026, the University of Vienna came in at number 95, making it the first Austrian university to break into the top 100. In the QS World University Ranking 2026, the University of Vienna ranked 152nd worldwide, making it the highest-ranked Austrian university. In the Shanghai Ranking for 2025, the University of Vienna continues to rank in the 101-150 group, remaining the highest-ranked Austrian university and the only one from Austria in the top 200.

Overall, the University of Vienna ranks among the top 50 in 13 subjects in the subject rankings of these three providers in 2025. The University of Vienna has the highest ranking in Mathematics and in Arts and Humanities. In Mathematics it is placed 34th in the world according to the Shanghai-Ranking. In Arts and Humanities it is placed 35th and 54th in the world according to the THE and QS ranking respectively. Outstanding subjects include Geography (ranked 28th globally in 2013), Linguistics and Philosophy (both 46th globally) and Law (ranked 73rd globally). It is rated high in academic reputation and number of international students, but low in terms of faculty-to-student ratio and citations per faculty.

QS World University Rankings by Subject (2024)
Communication & Media Studies	10
Theology	21
History	33
Archaeology	35
Classics & Ancient History	40
Anthropology	43
Linguistics	46
Philosophy	49
Sociology	55
Arts & Humanities	58
Modern Languages	62
Psychology	77
English Language & Literature	86
Earth & Marine Sciences	51-100
Geology	51-100
Geography	51-100
Geophysics	51-100
Politics	51-100
Statistics & Operational Research	51-100
Biological Sciences	96
Law & Legal Studies	97
Mathematics	97
Agriculture & Forestry	98
Natural Sciences	111

An overview of the QS World University Rankings by subjects:

Subjects	World Ranking by Years			
Subjects	2019	2020	2021	2022
Arts & Humanities	70	58	47	43
Classics & Ancient History	16	25	32	30
Archaeology	37	37	46	35
Politics	101–150	101–150	51–100	51–100
Theology	51–100	51–100	29	30
Philosophy	51–100	51–100	51–100	51–100
History	51–100	51–100	51–100	49
Sociology	51–100	51–100	74	59
Anthropology	51–100	48	49	46
Earth & Marine Sciences	51–100	51–100	101–150	101–150
Communication & Media Studies	35	30	24	19
Linguistics	51–100	33	30	35
Modern Languages	51–100	51–100	67	68

The Times Higher Education World University Rankings by subjects:

Year	World Ranking		
Year	Arts & Humanities	Business & Economics	Life Sciences
2019	30	83	95

The Shanghai-Ranking in Mathematics:

	World Ranking					
	2020	2021	2022	2023	2024	2025
Mathematics	36	33	29	34	31	34

== Awards ==
The University of Vienna has affiliations with eleven Nobel Prize winners. In addition, 15 academics from the University have been awarded the Wittgenstein Prize, Austria's most prestigious academic award. Since 2007, the University of Vienna has received more than 150 ERC Grants awarded by the European Research Council (ERC). This puts the University of Vienna in first place among all research institutions in Austria (as of 2025).

== Notable people ==
=== Faculty and scholars ===
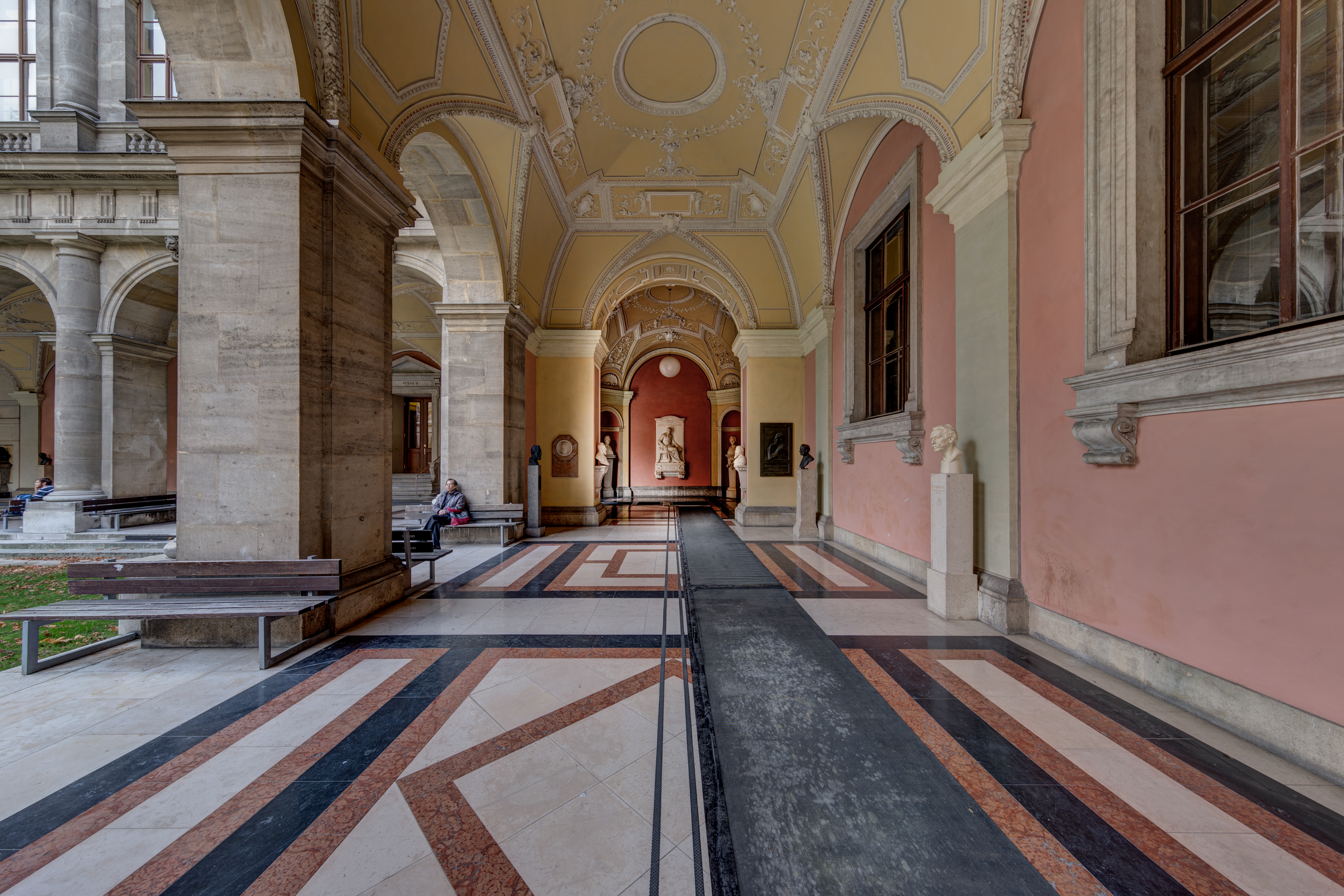
Arcades in the courtyard of the main building

Nobel Prize Laureates who taught at the University of Vienna include Robert Bárány, Julius Wagner-Jauregg, Hans Fischer, Karl Landsteiner, Erwin Schrödinger, Victor Franz Hess, Otto Loewi, Konrad Lorenz and Friedrich Hayek.

The University of Vienna was the cradle of the Austrian School of economics. The founders of this school who studied and later instructed at the University of Vienna included Carl Menger, Eugen von Böhm-Bawerk, Friedrich von Wieser, Joseph Schumpeter, Ludwig von Mises and Friedrich Hayek.

Other famous scholars who have taught or teach at the University of Vienna are Theodor W. Adorno, Alexander Van der Bellen, Manfred Bietak, Theodor Billroth, Ludwig Boltzmann, Ulrich Brand, Franz Brentano, Anton Bruckner, Rudolf Carnap, Conrad Celtes, Adrian Constantin, Viktor Frankl, Sigmund Freud, Karl Samuel Grünhut, Eduard Hanslick, Edmund Hauler, Jalile Jalil, Leon Kellner, Hans Kelsen, Adam František Kollár, Johann Josef Loschmidt, Franz Miklosich, Oskar Morgenstern, Otto Neurath, Johann Palisa, Pope Pius II, Karl Popper, August Reinisch, Elise Richter, Baron Carl von Rokitansky, Rudolf von Scherer, Peter Schuster, August Schleicher, Moritz Schlick, Ludwig Karl Schmarda, Joseph von Sonnenfels, Josef Stefan, Olga Taussky-Todd, Hans Thirring, Walter Thirring, Walter G. Url, Leopold Vietoris, Carl Auer von Welsbach, and Wilhelm Winkler.

=== Nobel laureates ===
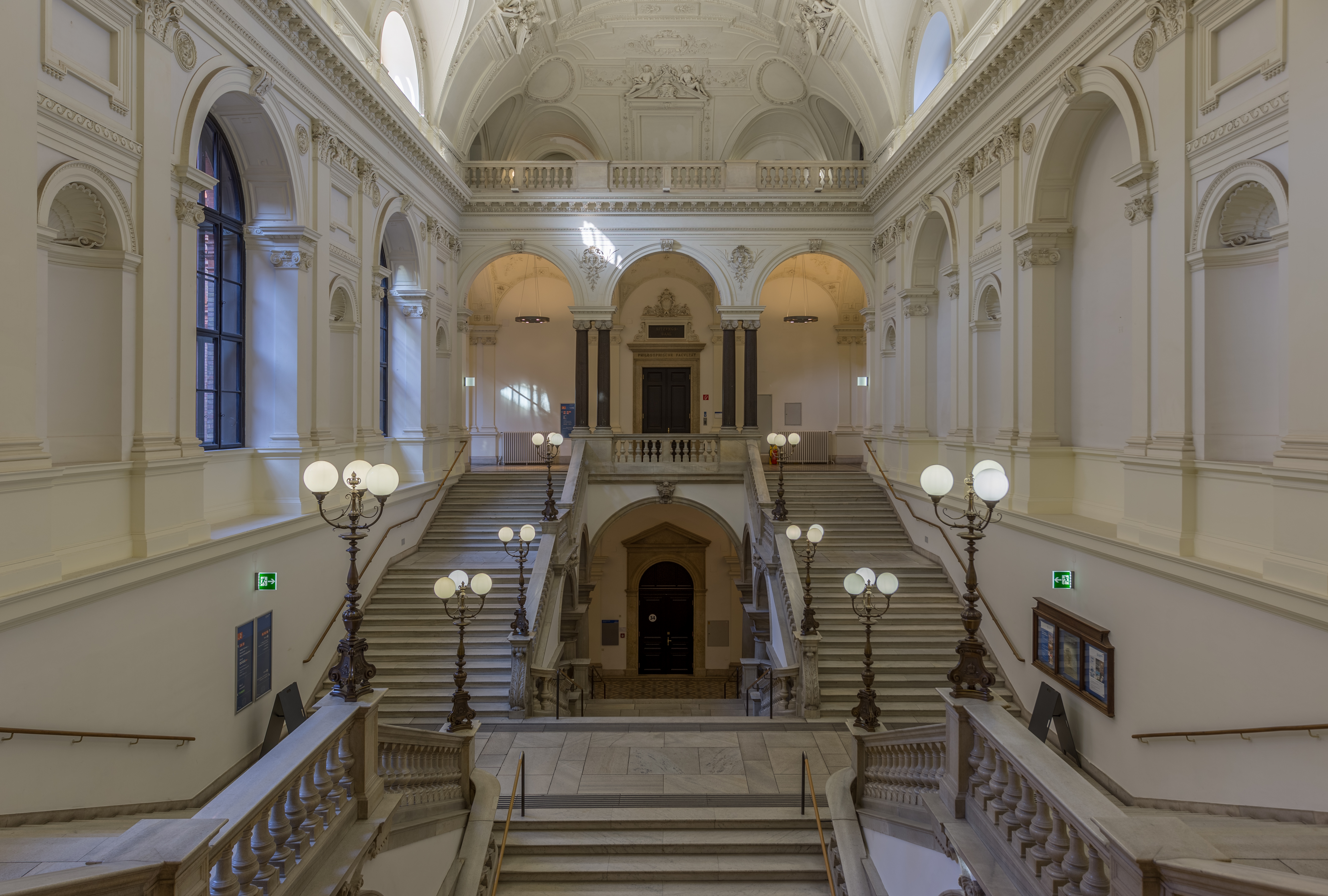
The grand staircase (Feststiege) in the Main Building

There are total 17 Nobel Prize Laureates affiliated to the university as follows:

Name	Field In	Year
Robert Bárány	Physiology or Medicine	1914
Richard Adolf Zsigmondy	Chemistry	1925
Julius Wagner-Jauregg	Physiology or Medicine	1927
Hans Fischer	Chemistry	1930
Karl Landsteiner	Physiology or Medicine	1930
Erwin Schrödinger	Physics	1933
Otto Loewi	Physiology or Medicine	1936
Victor Francis Hess	Physics	1936
Richard Kuhn	Chemistry	1938
Max Perutz	Chemistry	1962
Karl von Frisch	Physiology or Medicine	1973
Konrad Lorenz	Physiology or Medicine	1973
Friedrich Hayek	Economics	1974
Elias Canetti	Literature	1981
Elfriede Jelinek	Literature	2004
Emmanuelle Charpentier	Chemistry	2020
Anton Zeilinger	Physics	2022

=== Alumni ===
Some of the university's better-known students include: Kurt Adler, Franz Alt, Wilhelm Altar, Maria Anwander, Napoleon Baniewicz, Ilse Barea-Kulcsar, Bruno Bettelheim, Rudolf Bing, Lucian Blaga, Hedda Bolgar, Michael Brainin, Josef Breuer, F. F. Bruce, Elias Canetti, Ivan Cankar, Otto Maria Carpeaux, Friedrich Cerha, Felix Ehrenhaft, Olga Ehrenhaft-Steindler, Mihai Eminescu, Stephen Ferguson, Paul Feyerabend, Heinz Fischer, O. W. Fischer, Ivan Franko, Sigmund Freud, Adolf Albrecht Friedländer, Alcide De Gasperi, Nathan Michael Gelber, Hilda Geiringer, Kurt Gödel, Ernst Gombrich, Franz Grillparzer, Karina Grömer, Werner Gruber, Karl Samuel Grünhut, Pamela Gutman, Hans Hahn, Jörg Haider, Michael Haneke, Friedrich Hayek, Leo-Ferdinand Henckel von Donnersmarck, Theodor Herzl, Anneliese Hitzenberger, Hugo von Hofmannsthal, Edmund Husserl, Marie Jahoda, Max Jammer, Elfriede Jelinek, Percy Julian, Karl Kautsky, Leon Kellner, Hans Kelsen, Hryhoriy Khomyshyn, Jan Kickert, Rudolf Kirchschläger, Gertraud Knoll, Arthur Koestler, Jernej Kopitar, Karl Kordesch, Arnold Krammer, Karl Kraus, Bruno Kreisky, Richard Kuhn, Hermann F. Kvergić, Paul Lazarsfeld, Ignacy Łukasiewicz, Gustav Mahler, Tomáš Garrigue Masaryk, Lise Meitner, Gregor Mendel, Karl Menger, Franz Mesmer, Egon Orowan, Franz Miklosich, Alois Mock, Wolf-Dieter Montag, Matija Murko, Paul Niel, Joachim Oppenheim, Eduard Pernkopf, Anton Piëch, Ioan Nicolidi of Pindus, Pope Pius III, Hans Popper, Karl Popper, Otto Preminger, Wilhelm Reich, Wolfgang Rohrbach, Peter Safar, Monika Salzer, Mordecai Sandberg, Mordkhe Schaechter, Karl Schenkl, Max Schloessinger, Marianne Schmidl, Andreas Schnider, Arthur Schnitzler, Albin Schram, Joseph Schumpeter, Wolfgang Schüssel, Peter Schuster, John J. Shea, Jr., Mihalj Šilobod Bolšić, Maria Simon, Felix Somary, Marian Smoluchowski, Adalbert Stifter, Countess Stoeffel, Yemima Tchernovitz-Avidar, Eric Voegelin, Maria Wähnl, Kurt Waldheim, Calvin Edouard Ward, Otto Weininger, Slavko Wolf, Eduard Zirm, Stefan Zweig, and Huldrych Zwingli.

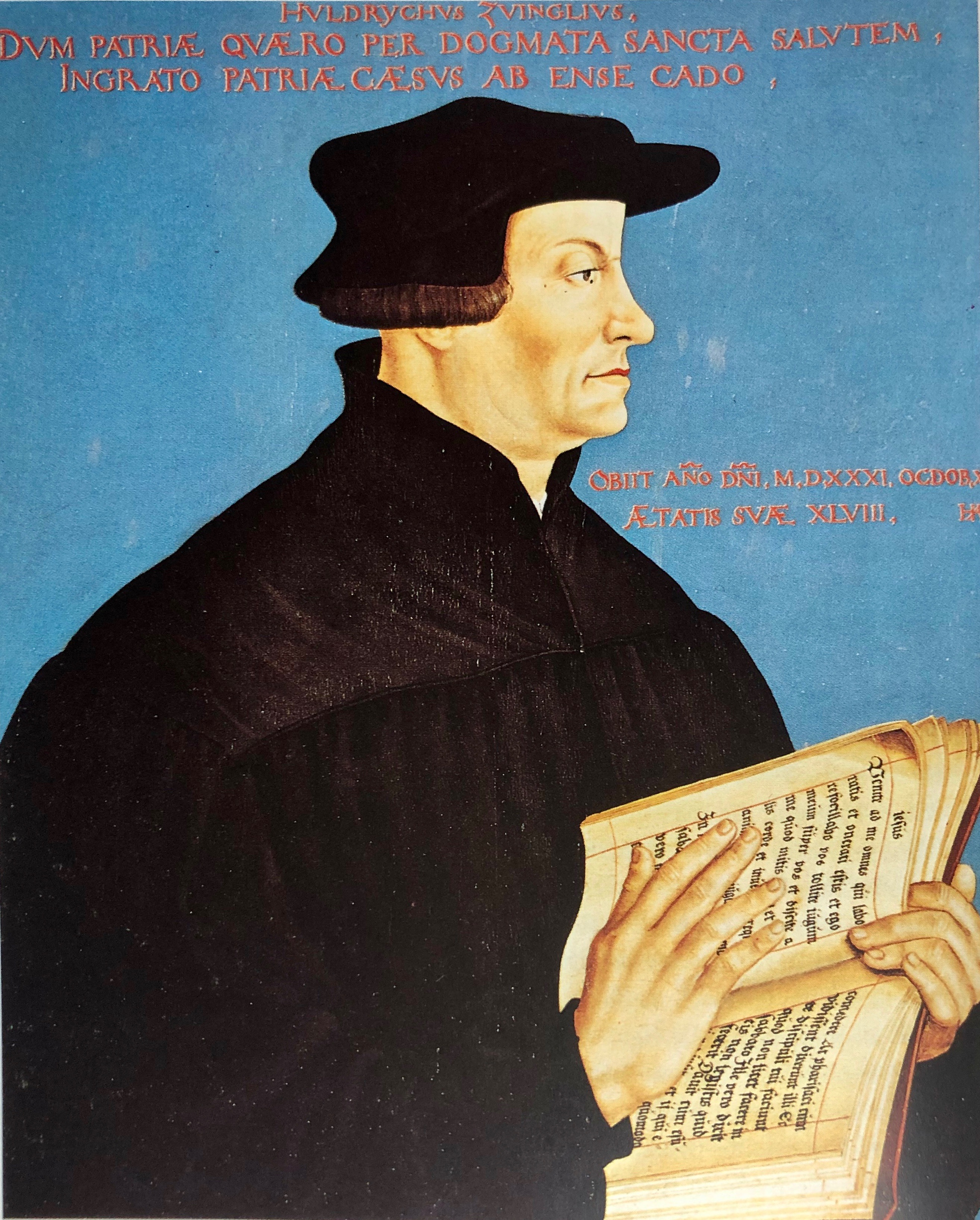
Huldrych Zwingli

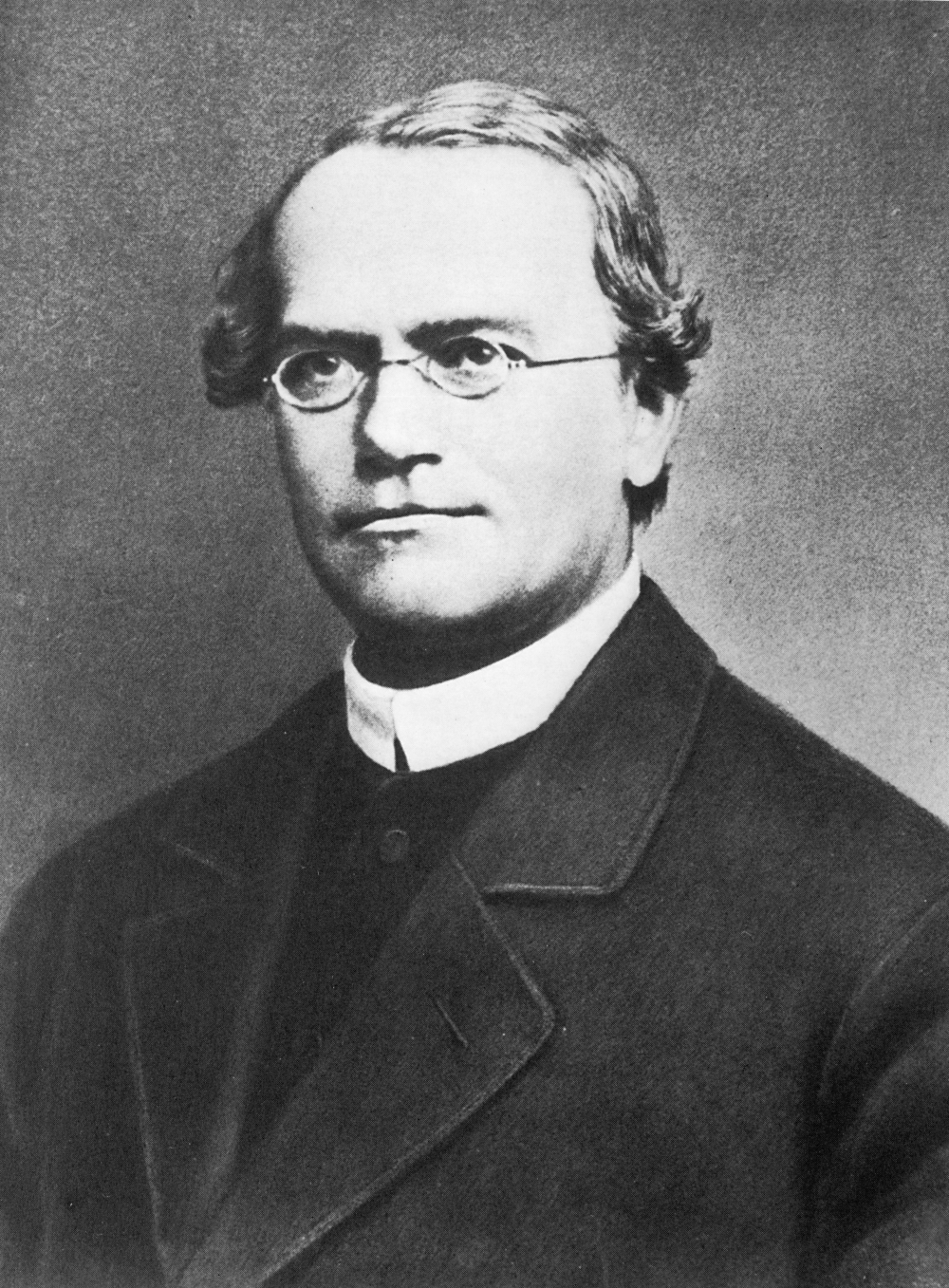
Gregor Mendel

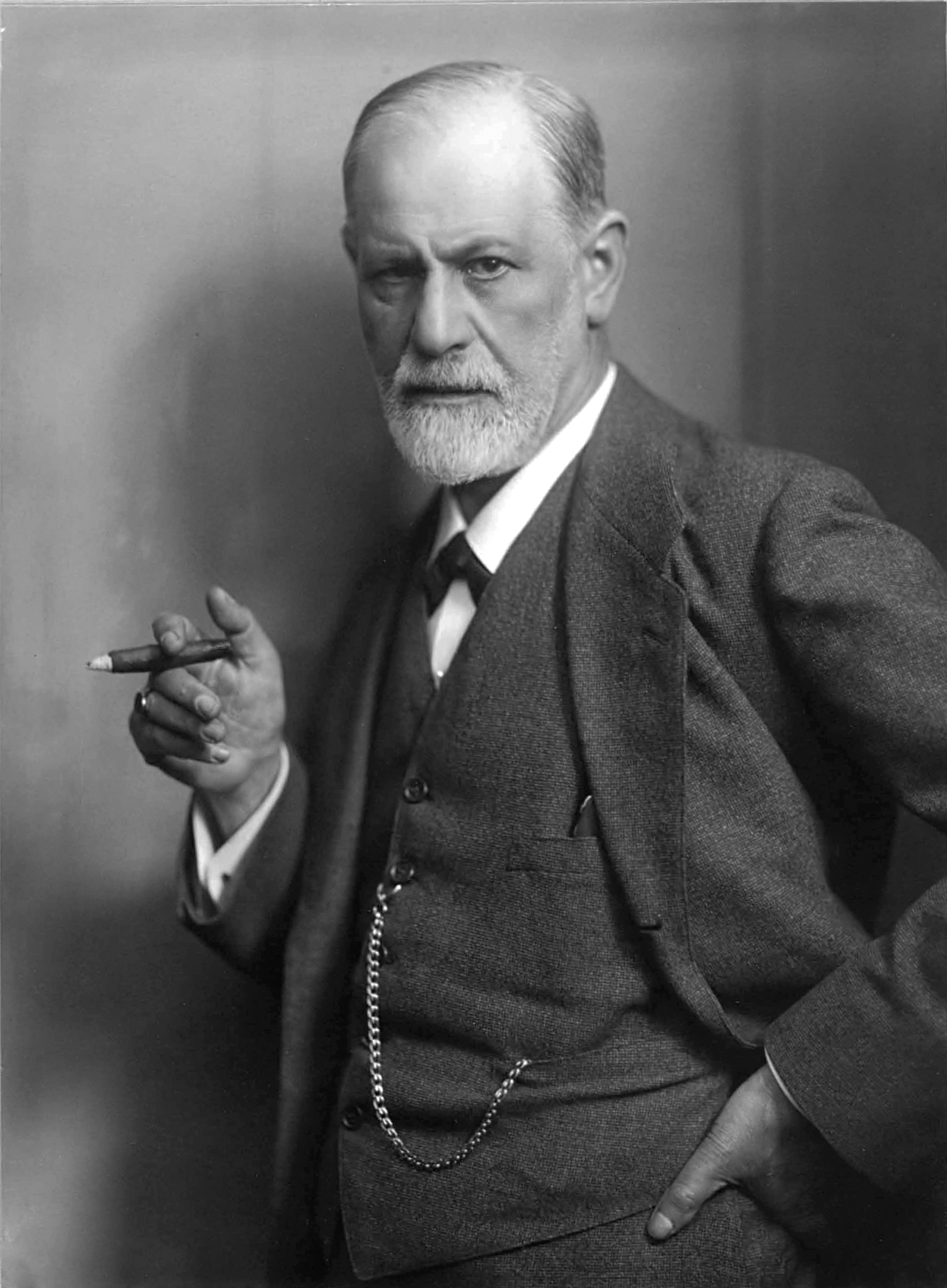
Sigmund Freud

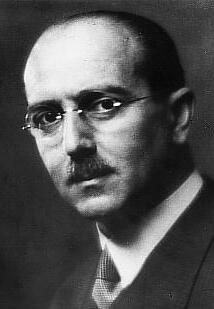
Hans Kelsen

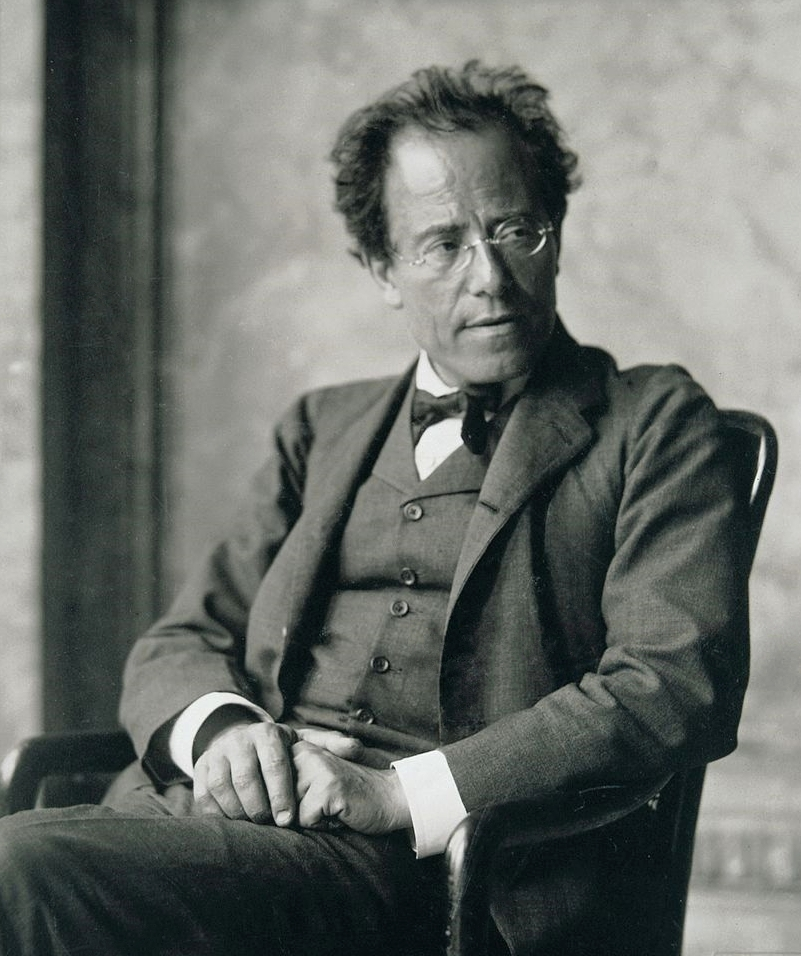
Gustav Mahler

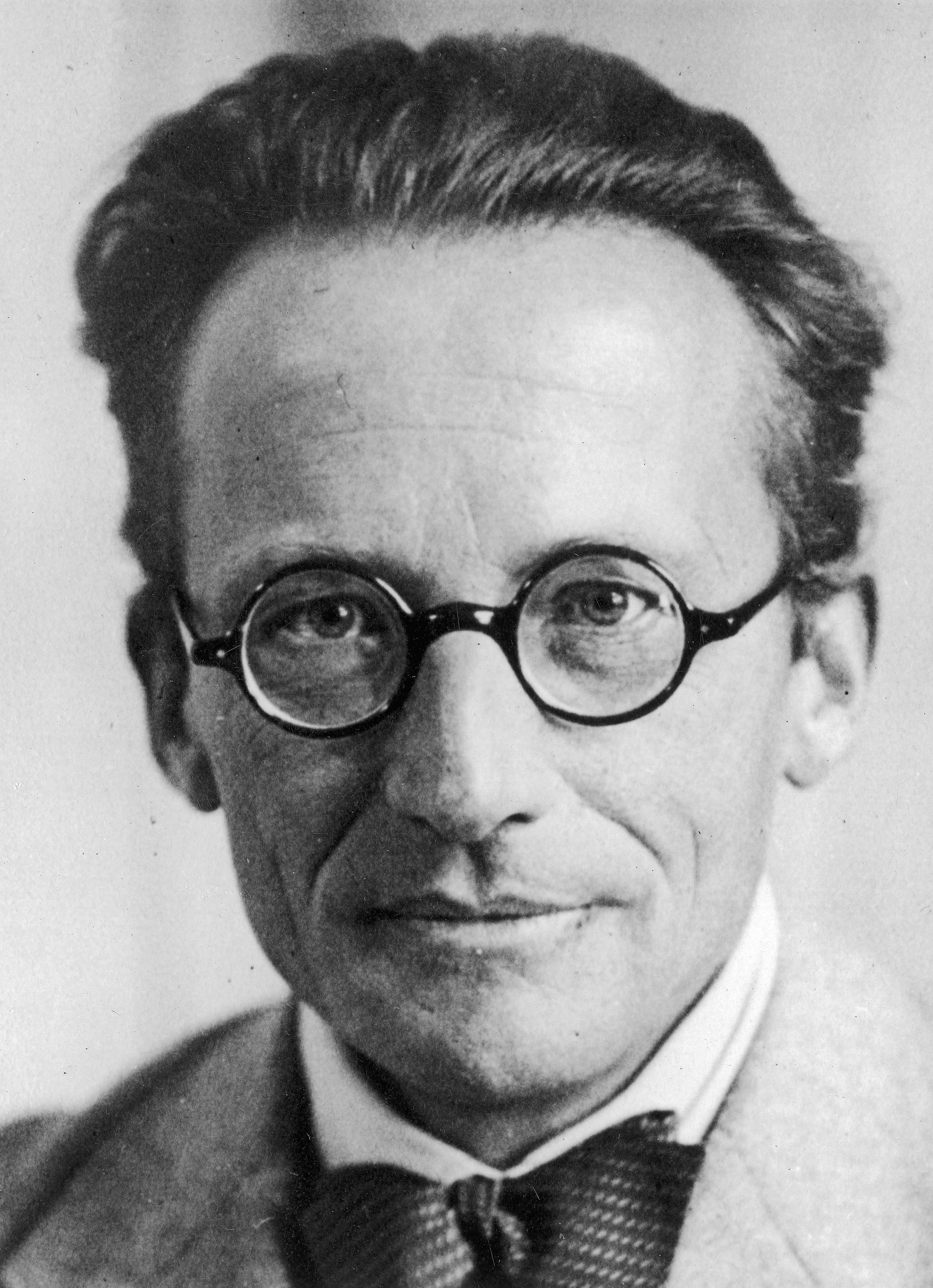
Erwin Schrödinger

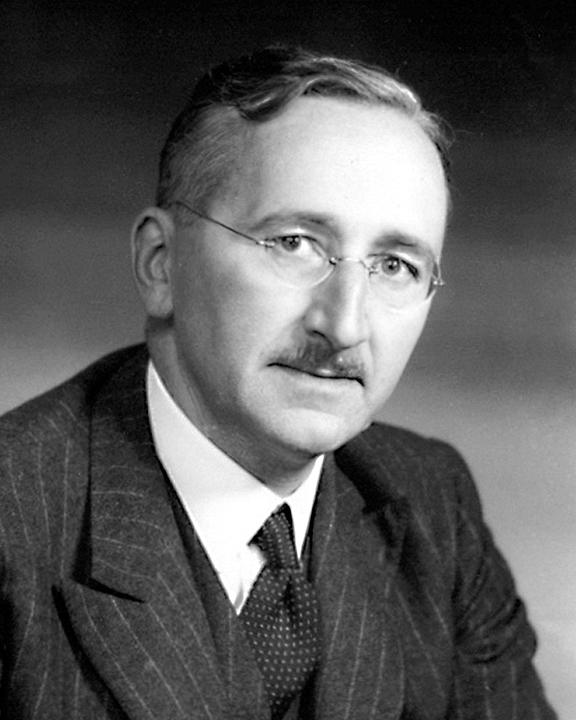
Friedrich Hayek

== See also ==
- Education in Austria
- Klimt University of Vienna Ceiling Paintings
- Campus of the University of Vienna
- Vienna Observatory
- List of medieval universities
- List of Jesuit sites
