= Paul Niel =

Austrian investor

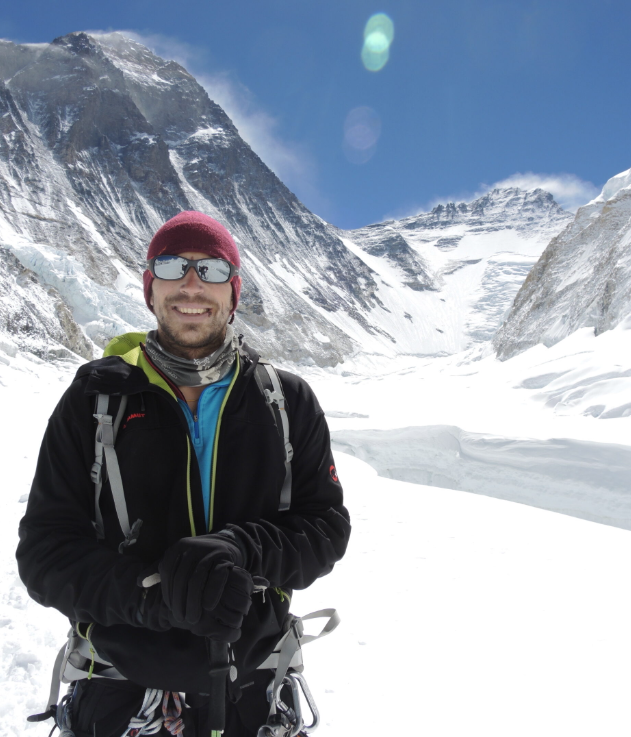
- Paul Niel at Mount Everest, 2013
- Born: Austria
- Education: University of Vienna
- Occupations: Investor, adventurer, explorer, public speaker
- Years active: 2002–present
- Website: www.paulniel.com

Paul Niel is an Austrian adventurer, explorer, and public speaker. He has organized and participated in more than 15 expeditions across all continents.

In 2013, Niel summitted Mount Everest and Lhotse, the world's 4th highest peak, within 24 hours. He also completed the seven summits project, the highest mountain on every continent.

== Early life and education ==
Niel graduated in statistics from the University of Vienna. In 2002, Niel moved to London and started working at JPMorgan and Goldman Sachs. In 2013, he founded Lhotse Consult, a boutique investment consultancy focusing on technology and alternative investments.

Niel was selected for the Graduate Studies Program at Singularity University in 2014, where he co-founded Peared, an augmented reality project. He received the Austrian Foerderpreis by the Austrian Statistical Society in 2002.

== Exploration ==
=== Seven Summits ===
Between 2005 and 2012, Niel climbed Kilimanjaro (Africa), Elbrus (Europe), Carstensz Pyramid (Oceania), Aconcagua (South America) and Mount Vinson (Antarctica).

In 2013, Niel successfully reached the summit of both Mount Everest (8850m) and Lhotse (8510m) the world's highest and fourth highest mountain within 24 hours. The same year he also summited Denali in North America and completed the Seven Summits Project, to ascend the highest peak on every continent.

=== Eastern Tibet ===
In 2015 Niel co-led an international expedition which successfully claimed the first ascent of Dechok Phodrang, a 5632m high peak in the Gangga Massif in Eastern Tibet. He co-produced Tibetan Dreams, a documentary highlighting the climb, which has been selected for screening that Mountainfilm Fest Graz 2016, Kathmandu International Film Festival and three other film festival.

=== Education Explorers ===
In 2015, Niel initiated the charity project Education Explorers which addressed the problem of girl access to schooling in India and was undertaken together with Indian charity Educate Girls. Niel and a group of fellow explorers from Hong Kong and Chile traversed India in a Motor Rickshaw and raised more than HKD 500,000 in funds. The documentary, produced by Niel together with Tom Boarder, received the Award of Excellence by the Hollywood Independent International Documentary Festival in 2018.

=== Round the Island Expedition ===
In 2017, Niel together with his wife successfully completed the first coasteering expedition around Hong Kong Island. The project raised awareness for plastic pollution and the couple mapped 163 trash pollution spots along Hong Kong Islands coast. In addition water samples taken along the expedition were analysed by The Open University of Hong Kong.

The couple released the documentary The Loop, featuring the adventure and the issue of coastal pollution. It was screened at Mountainfilm Graz in November 2019.

=== Chapman Andrews Centennial Expedition ===
Niel was a member of the 2018 Chapman Andrews Centennial Expedition to search for fossils in the Gobi desert using latest drone and imaging technology. The expedition has been awarded the 2019 Citation of Merit award by The Explorers Club.

=== Project Avenger ===
In November 2021 Niel led an international team of experts to successfully identify and uncover a US Navy TBF Avenger airplane that crash-landed during Operation Gratitude on 16 January 1945. The expedition combined elements of community archeology together with LIDAR and 3D scanning technology.

=== Miscellaneous ===
Niel currently serves as the Head of Expeditions for the Explorers Club Hong Kong Chapter. He has traveled to 97 countries and has organized more than 15 expeditions. He also participated in the Clipper Round the World Ocean Race 2013-14 for Team Switzerland.

In 2019, Paul Niel and his wife Esther set two new Guinness World Records for visiting the most UNESCO world heritage sites in 12 and in 24 hours.

In 2021, Niel hiked with his wife and 6-year-old daughter Zaya to Everest Base Camp. She became the youngest girl ever to do so.

== Speaking ==
Niel is a frequent speaker on motivational and technology topics and worked with the Royal Geographic Society and Asia Society. He has spoken at conferences and corporate events in Europe and Asia. He has also spoken at two TEDx events and frequently contributes to the Royal Geographic Society School Outreach Program.

Niel is also a contributor to the South China Morning Post, Action Asia Magazine and other publications.
