= Walter G. Url =

Austrian scientist and academic (1929–2021)

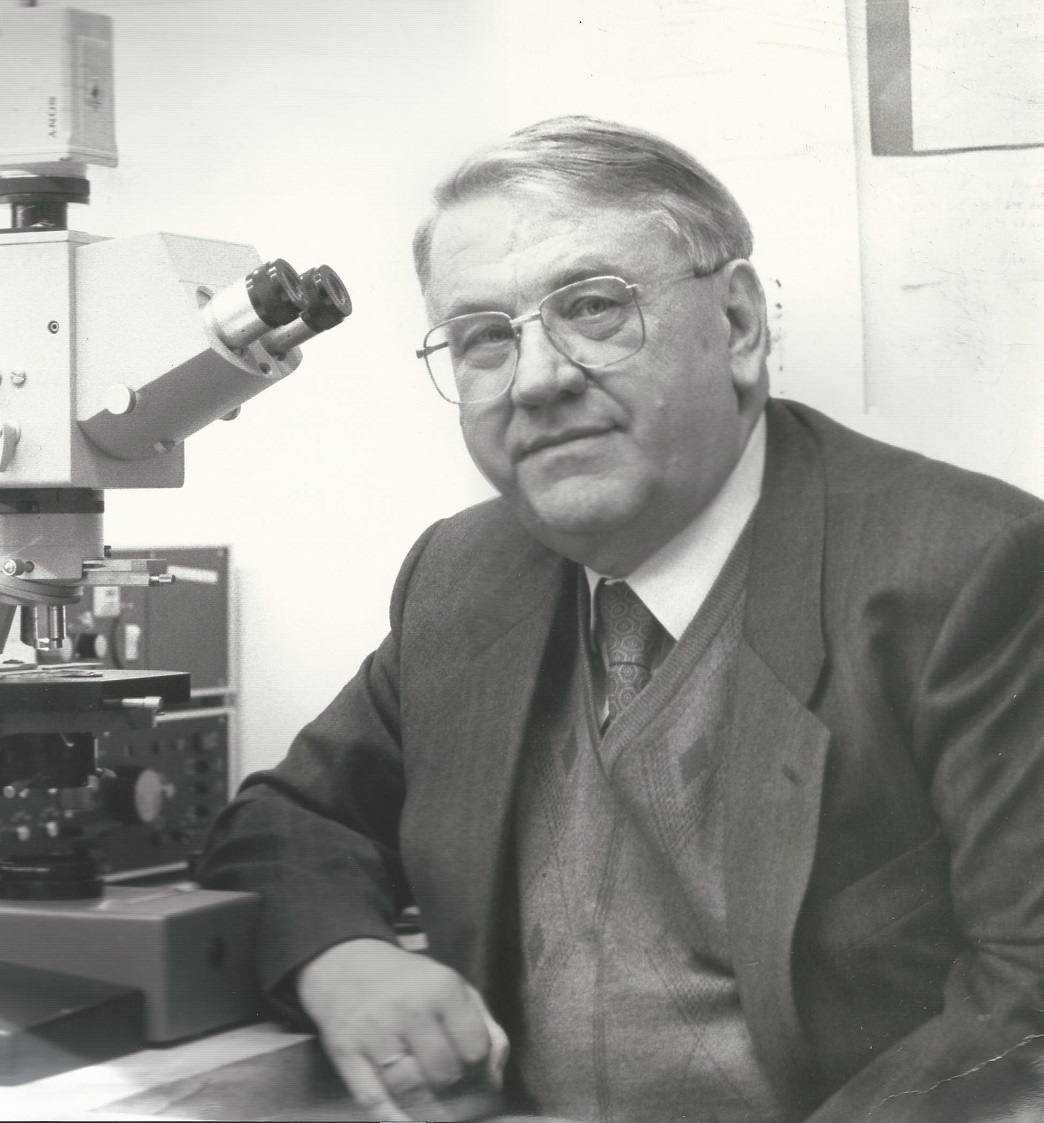
- Born: 9 October 1929; Vienna, Austria
- Died: 10 April 2021 (aged 91); Vienna, Austria
- Education: University of Vienna, Ph.D. Plant Cell Biology 1952
- Known for: Cell biology, plant physiology, microscopy
- Scientific career
- Fields: Cell biology, plant physiology, microscopy
- Workplaces: University of Vienna; Natural History Museum, Vienna
- Website: Walter G. Url

Walter Gustav Url (9 October 1929 – 10 April 2021) was an Austrian scientist and academic. As Professor Emeritus in the Faculty of Life Sciences of the University of Vienna, he was notable for his work on membranes, plant physiology, and scientific film.

== Personal life ==
Walter Gustav Url FRMS was born on 9 October 1929, in Vienna. He completed Gymnasium in Diefenbachgasse and studied biology and geography at the University of Vienna. He married Edith Zapletal, later a secondary school teacher in the Gymnasium Rahlgasse (de), on 28 December 1955. They had two children: Elisabeth and Michael. Edith died after a long battle with illness in 2016, and Michael unexpectedly in 2018. He lived for most of his life in Ottakring in Vienna. Url died on 10 April 2021, at the age of 91.

== Academic career ==
Url earned his Ph.D. in plant cell biology from the University of Vienna in 1952, studying the permeability of plasma membranes in plant cells under Karl Höfler (de). After receiving his Ph.D., Url became an assistant in the university's Institute of Plant Physiology until earning his habilitation for work on the radiation tolerance of plant cells in 1959, becoming Docent in the anatomy and physiology of plants. Url continued his career in 1968 with a postdoctoral fellowship at the University of Minnesota with a grant from the Max Kade foundation, in which he focused on the water permeability of the protoplasm of plant cells.

Url returned to Vienna to become an associate professor at the University of Vienna in 1970, establishing a working group in cell physiology and scientific film in the (now dissolved) Institute of Plant Physiology. He became a full professor for anatomy and physiology of plants with a specialization in teaching pharmacy students from 1983, under the Faculty of Life Sciences. He additionally helped establish the Institute of Nutrition Sciences at the University of Vienna. Url retired from the Faculty of Life Sciences at the University of Vienna in 1999 as Professor Emeritus, joining the Natural History Museum, Vienna as a fellow under director Bernd Lötsch (de). He helped establish the museum's "Mikrotheater", a long-running public exhibition of microscopic films.

== Research and teaching ==
Url's scientific career focused on two major topics, which generally intertwined: plant cell physiology with a focus on membrane characteristics and plasmolysis, and the development of microscopy, particularly microcinematography. He also valued field work as an important basis for further lab work, especially in his studies of algal flora. This work also spurred his interest in ecology and environmentalism.

In his work on plant cell physiology, Url studied membrane permeability and the tolerance of plant cells to stress factors such as heavy metals and radiation.

His research in this field was often motivated by and tied to his work in microscopy and advancing the field of microcinematography. Investigating the dynamic properties of living cells demanded higher resolution light microscopy to record cellular structures in motion, which had to that point mainly been visible in static electron microscope photographs. These included pioneering work with the ultraviolet microscope in 1964 and 1987, introduction of video techniques to improve microscope resolution allowing the observation of the endoplasmic reticulum and organelle structure in living plant cells.

This development of film techniques for dynamic cell processes led to an interest in science education and communication. Url produced numerous movies covering cell structure and functions in living organisms for a student audience. This work was done in close collaboration with his colleague Oswald Kiermayer from the University of Salzburg as well as the support of Hans-Karl Galle of the Institute for Scientific Film (de) and Siegfried Hermann of the Austrian Institute of Scientific Film. Several of the films won scientific awards, including a 1986 state award for outstanding achievement in audiovisual production and education from the Republic of Austria for a series of films on physiological processes in plant cells.

His interest in education extended to ensuring the audiovisual microscopic knowledge he had was passed on to his students, and Url spent considerable time and effort on sharing it with future generations of scientists.
