= Simon Brainin =

Latvian-American physician (1854–1911)

Simon Michael Brainin (July 15, 1854 – March 31, 1911) was a Latvian-American physician.

Brainin graduated from the gymnasium in his native Riga; studied medicine at the universities of Dorpat and Berlin; held the position of physician of the Jewish community of Riga; and was one of the directors of the community, the last independent Jewish kahal in Russia, until this institution was abolished by the government. He was a member of the committee of the government to investigate the rights of the Jews of the city of Riga, 1885; delegate from the government of Poltava to the rabbinical conference at St. Petersburg, 1892; and a member of the Society for the Promotion of Culture Among the Jews of Russia. In 1895, he immigrated to New York City, where he became (1902) a practicing physician, and member of the county medical and German medical societies, of the Harlem Medical Association, and of the New York Historical Society. He died in New York City.

== Literary works ==
Brainin is the author of:

- "Oraḥ la-Ḥayyim", a work on popular medicine, in Hebrew, Wilna, 1883
- "Der Aerztliche Führer", Riga, 1885
- "Ueber Kefyr," Vienna, 1886

and many articles in various periodicals.

== See also ==
- Brainin
