= Wolfgang Rohrbach =

Austrian university professor

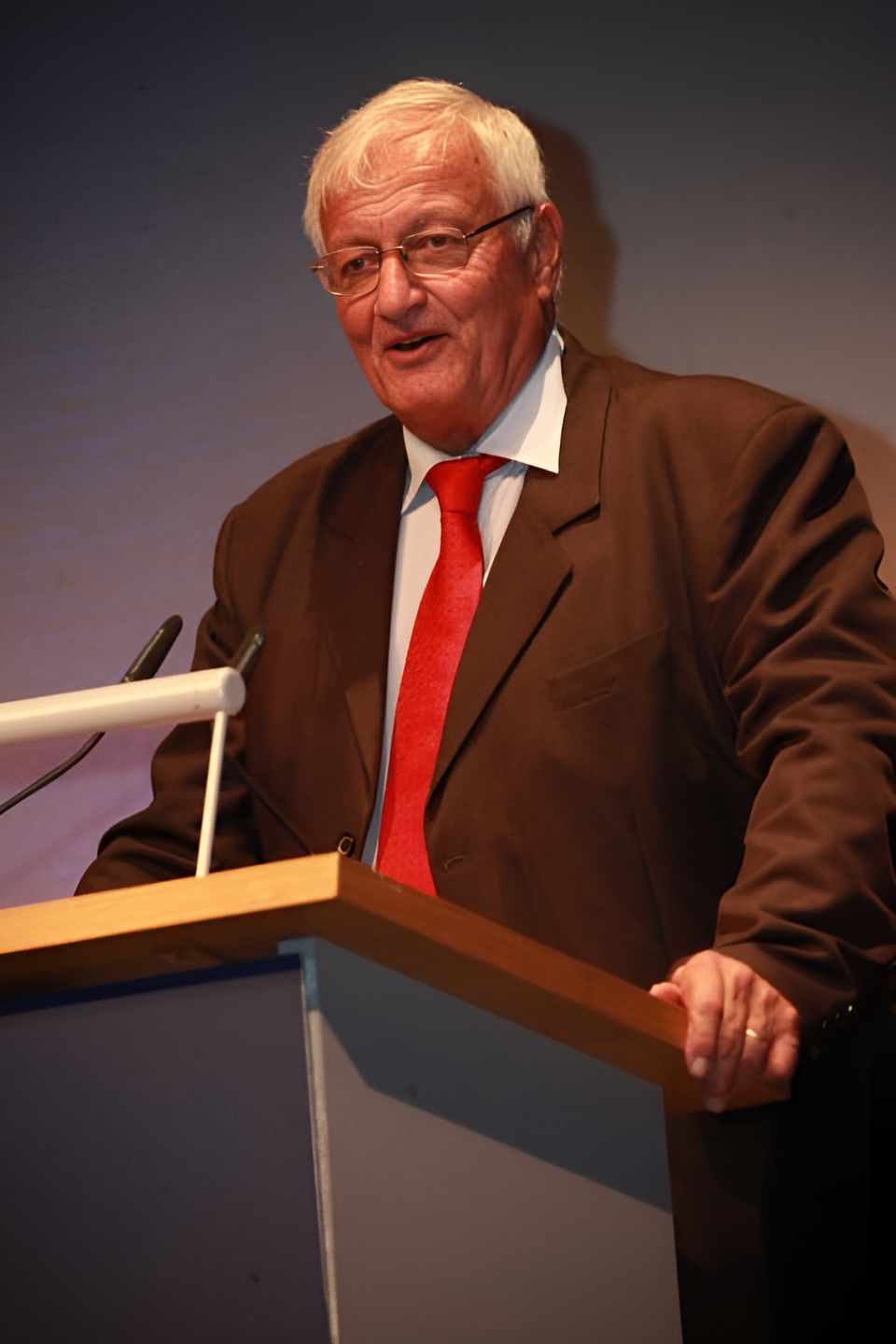
- Born: Wolfgang Rohrbach; June 11, 1947 (age 79); Vienna
- Scientific career
- Fields: University professor, expert in insurance and health economics

Wolfgang Rohrbach (Vienna, June 11, 1947) is an Austrian university professor, expert in economic history, insurance, and health economics, triple doctor of science, full member of the EASA, the European Academy of Sciences and Arts from Salzburg, president of Europa Nostra Austria, an organization for the protection of monuments in Europe from Krems, honorary president of OLIP, the organization for international publications on life insurance from Linz, as well as vice president of ÖSG, the Austrian Serbian Association in Vienna.

== Education ==
From 1966 to 1967, after finishing high school in Vienna, Rohrbach served in the Austrian Federal Army. After that, he studied history and Slavic philology at the University of Vienna from 1967 to 1972. He earned his PhD in the fields of history of economics and sociology, as well as Slavic philology (with major languages Russian and Serbo-Croatian), obtaining the title of Doctor of Philology.

== Career ==
Since 1973, Rohrbach has worked in the insurance industry in various roles (statistician, economic analyst, publicist, press spokesperson, and product design manager).

From 1980 to 1999, Wolfgang Rohrbach was the head of the communications department and editor-in-chief of several professional journals at the "Austria-Kollegialität" insurance company. From 2000 to 2006, he held the same position at the headquarters of the UNIQA Insurance Group, after which he worked in Belgrade as a sales consultant for UNIQA Serbia.

From 2007 to 2014, Rohrbach also worked as a scientific consultant for "Centra-Consult", an economic and tax consultancy firm, primarily for UNIQA Serbia. Additionally, he was an appraiser and expert for insurance in Southeast Europe within the framework of the German Society for Technical Cooperation (GTZ). In 2014, he became the director of the "VR UNIQA Consulting" association in Serbia.

Rohrbach's university career has run parallel to his practical work in the insurance industry. From 1984 to 1989, he was a lecturer at the University of Vienna, and from 1986 to 1989, at the Vienna University of Economics and Business. Since 1990, he has delivered guest lectures at universities and academies in Eastern and Southeastern Europe, including Slovakia, Hungary, Serbia, Bosnia and Herzegovina, Montenegro, and North Macedonia.

From 1996, he resumed teaching in Austria at the Danube University Krems (insurance science), as well as at the Medical Faculty of the University of Vienna and universities in Vienna and Salzburg (health economics, health insurance). He was awarded the professional title "Professor" in 1997 by the President of Austria.

In 2006, he habilitated at the Faculty of Economics of the University of West Hungary in Sopron with his habilitation thesis "The Impact of Demographic Development on Health and Pension Insurance Systems". Since that year, he has been a lecturer at the Faculty of Business and Service Industries (FABUS) in Novi Sad, and from 2007 to 2009, a visiting professor for insurance management at the Faculty of Business and Management in Belgrade.

From 2009 to 2013, he worked as a full professor for economics and finance at the Higher School of Modern Business in Belgrade. During the 2014/15 academic year, he was a visiting professor at the Saint Elizabeth University for Health and Social Sciences in Bratislava. In the 2016/17 academic year, he was a visiting professor and chair of the doctoral commission at the Apeiron University in Banja Luka. Since 2017, he has continued to teach as a visiting professor at the European University in Brčko. From 2018 to 2020, he lectured at the Faculty of Law at the University of Kragujevac, and in 2019, he was a visiting professor at the University of Würzburg.

== Academic and Professional Titles ==
Wolfgang Rohrbach holds several honorary doctorates and academic titles, including an honorary doctorate from the European University in Brčko and the title of Honorary Professor at the Danube University and the University for Continuing Education Krems.

== Affiliations and Awards ==
Since 2014, he has been a full member of the European Academy of Sciences and Arts in Salzburg, and since 2017, a member of the Serbian Royal Academy of Sciences and Arts in Belgrade. He has received numerous national and international awards for his work in the field of insurance and health economics, including:

- Austrian Cross of Honour for Science and Art
- Golden Honour Badge for Merits to the Republic of Austria
- Golden Honour Badge of the State of Lower Austria
- Golden Honour Badge of the State of Styria
- Golden Honour Badge of the State of Vienna
- Golden Honour Badge of the State of Salzburg
- Silver Honour Badge of the State of Upper Austria
- Honorary Goblet from Federal Chancellor Dr. Franz Vranitzky for Outstanding Contributions to Basketball
- Great Honour from the Ministry of Diaspora of the Republic of Serbia
- Confirmation of Appointment as Commercial Advisor of the Panama Chamber of Commerce
- Golden Plaque for Outstanding Contributions to the Social Sciences from the European University in Brčko

== Publications and Activities ==
As an author and editor, Rohrbach has published numerous works and books on the history of the insurance industry and health economics. Notably, his sixteen-volume encyclopedic work The History of Insurance in Austria has received international acclaim and has been regularly updated since 1988. He is involved in various scientific and educational projects both in Austria and abroad. Since 1973, he has been an author of scholarly literature and editor of several specialized journals on insurance. Since 2003, he has worked as a lecturer and publisher on topics like migration, integration, and learning from modern history within the projectXchange initiative. He is a member of the editorial team of the European Review of Insurance Law (Editor: Association Internationale de Droit des Assurances), Belgrade. He is also the author of the book The Emergence and Development of Scientific Slavic Studies in Vienna, published in 2020 by Tronik Design in Belgrade. Wolfgang Rohrbach continues his scientific work and is actively involved in various scientific and educational projects both domestically and internationally.

== See also ==
- Health economics
