= Michael Brainin =

Austrian neurologist

- Born: 1951 (age 74–75)
- Education: University of Vienna
- Scientific career
- Fields: neurology

Michael Brainin (born 24 May 1951) is an Austrian neurologist and emeritus professor at the Danube University Krems. He is widely known as a pioneer in stroke research and prevention as well as a leading figure in the development of stroke units. Brainin was president of the Austrian Stroke Society, the European Stroke Organisation and the World Stroke Organization.

== Life ==
Brainin was born in Vienna.

He received his doctor's degree at the University of Vienna in 1976. He served his residency at the Landeskrankenhaus for Neurology and Psychiatry Gugging, where he also worked closely with the Gugginger Artists (a famous art brut collective) and supported the Democratic Psychiatry movement. In 1983, he received the specialist doctor's decree for neurology and psychiatry. During 1989/90, he worked at the Stroke Center of the Neurological Institute at New York's Columbia Presbyterian Medical Center and the National Institutes of Health Intramural Stroke Program in Bethesda, Maryland, and at the Hôpital La Pitié-Sâlpétrière Paris. In 1991 he completed his post-doc at the University of Vienna.

In 1994 Brainin was appointed chairman of the neurological department at the Gugging Hospital where, in 1997, he founded the first acute stroke unit in Austria. From 2007 he moved as chair and professor to the neurological department of the newly founded University Hospital Tulln. Until his retirement from hospital work in 2016 he was Principle Co-Investigator of numerous international studies on new treatments for stroke, including thrombolysis and neuroprotection.

From 1995 onwards, Brainin was affiliated with the Danube University Krems, In 1998, Brainin was appointed head of the Center for Postgraduate Studies in Neurosciences. In 2005 he was appointed full professor and chairman of the Department for Clinical Neurosciences and Preventive Medicine where he remained until his retirement in 2020.

Brainin published numerous scientific publications in journals such as Lancet, Lancet Neurology, Nature Reviews Neurology, as well as three textbooks on stroke. He is or was Senior Consulting Editor of the journal Stroke, co-editor of the European Journal of Neurology and a member of the Editorial Board of the International Journal of Stroke, the European Stroke Journal, the Journal of the Neurological Sciences, the Journal for Neuroepidemiology as well as of Frontiers in Neurology.

== Scientific merits ==
In 1998, Brainin co-founded the Austrian Stroke Society (ÖGSF) and was elected as its first president, where he pioneered the planning and establishment of acute stroke units. He also established the first stroke database in Austria, from which the Austrian Stroke Unit Register emerged.

From 2012 to 2014, Brainin was President of the European Stroke Organization (ESO) and from 2018 to 2020, he was President of the World Stroke Organization (WSO). In this global position he propagated the similarities of prevention strategies for stroke as well as dementia and published the "Declaration on the Prevention of Stroke and Dementia" while also developing the project 'Cut Stroke in Half'. From 2008 to 2017, Brainin was also head of the Education Committee of the WSO. In this function, he supported the development of a global network of stroke researchers as well as the educational programs for stroke physicians in numerous countries. Brainin also co-founded the World Stroke Academy, a web-based learning platform. Together with Wolf-Dieter Heiss, he developed the European Stroke Master Program at the Danube University Krems in 2007, an international program for the training of stroke specialists.

Brainin is active in numerous of the WSO's activities. Together with Valery Feigin, he chairs the WSO's Global Policy Committee. He organized and co-chaired numerous international congresses, including the World Stroke Congress in 2020. Throughout his career, he represented the stroke agenda in meetings with the UN and the WHO, often jointly with the World Federation of Neurology, World Heart Federation and World Hypertension League. He is the initiator and supporter of global stroke prevention programs (such as the "Cut Stroke in Half" program). Brainin furthermore advised many countries on the creation and implementation of strategies for stroke treatment, stroke prevention and specialist training (including a training program of 9,000 doctors which he led in Vietnam, as well as other programs in Myanmar, China, Russia and the Philippines). He also supported the founding of the African Stroke Organisation.

His scientific achievements include the development of dysphagia screening, the Gugging Swallowing Screen (GUSS). To harmonize post-stroke care Brainin initiated the development of the Post Stroke Checklist (PSC). A focus of his research was Post-Stroke Cognitive Decline: He initiated and carried out with his team the first randomized polyintervention trial (ASPIS) for the prevention of post-stroke cognitive decline.

== Awards ==
In 2017, Brainin received the Science Award of the State of Lower Austria, the Marinescu Award of the Romanian Society for Neurology (2015), honorary doctorates from the universities of Iuliu Hațieganu (Romania) and Hanoi (Vietnam), as well an honorary professorship at Zhengzhou University in China. He is International Fellow of the American Stroke Association and Fellow of the European Academy of Neurology. Among his Honorary Memberships are those of the European Stroke Organization, the French Neurological Society, and the Indian, Hungarian and Brazilian and Korean Stroke Societies. Brainin is also an honorary member of the Austrian Stroke Society and has been awarded with the annual Hans Chiari Lecture in 2022. In 2021, Brainin received the Presidential Award from the European Stroke Organization (ESO), the Ring of Honor from the Danube University Krems, and the Silver Commander's Cross for Services to the State of Lower Austria. In 2022, Brainin was further awarded the WSO Leadership Award as well as the Daniel Lackland Excellence Award in Diplomacy and Advocacy for Population Hypertension Risk Reduction by the World Hypertension League. In 2024, he was elected as member of the European Academy of Sciences and Arts as well as a member of the Academia Europaea.
