= Reuben Brainin =

Russian Jewish publicist and biographer

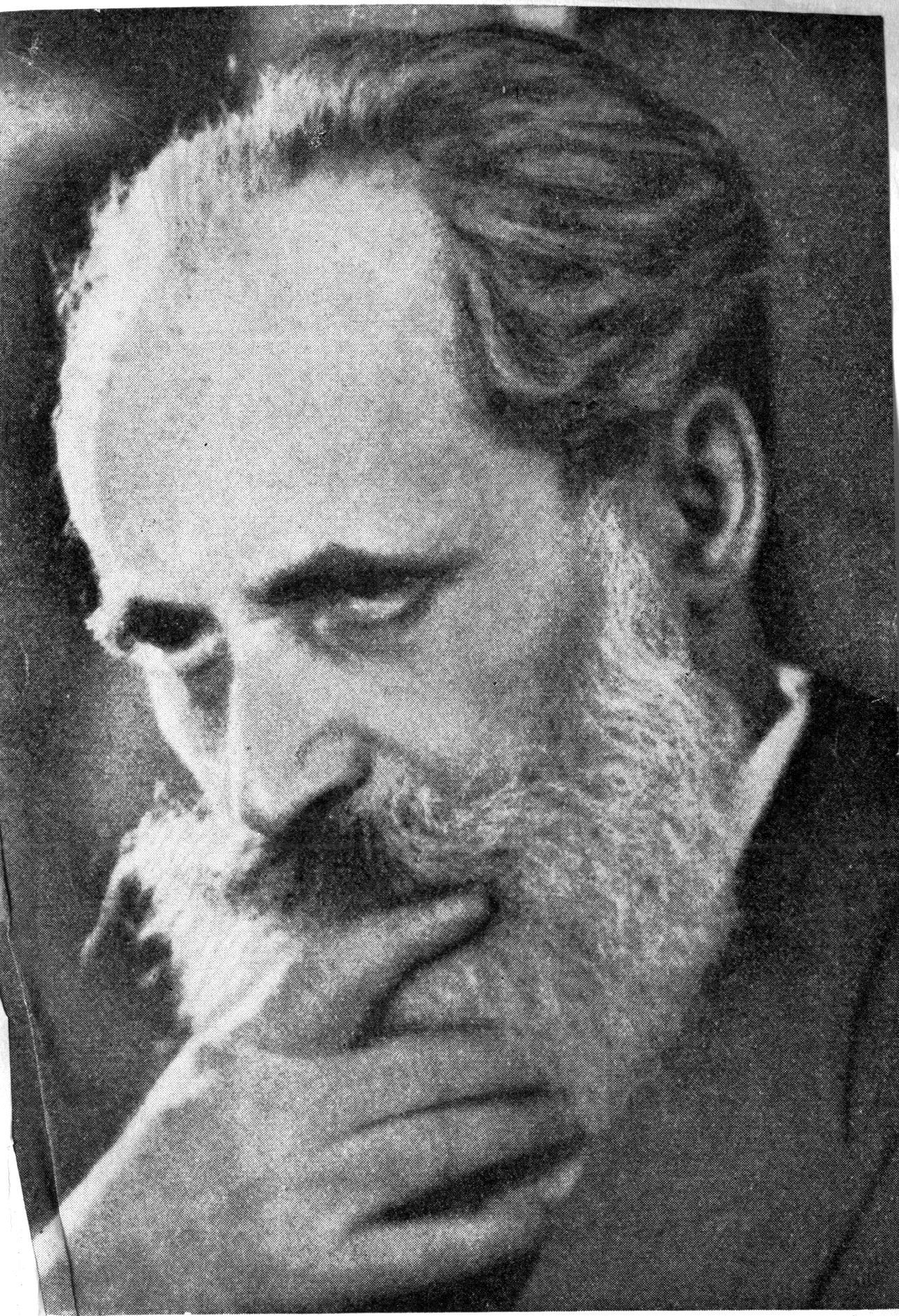
- Born: March 16, 1862; Lyady, Mogilev Governorate, Russian Empire
- Died: November 30, 1939 (aged 77); New York City, United States
- Resting place: Shaar Hashomayim Cemetery, Montreal
- Writing career
- Genres: Literary criticism, biography

Reuben ben Mordecai Brainin (Hebrew: ראובן בריינין, romanized: Reuven Brainin; March 16, 1862 – November 30, 1939) was a Russian Jewish publicist, biographer and literary critic.

== Biography ==
Reuben Brainin was born in Lyady, Russian Empire (now Belarus), in 1862 to Mordechai Brainin, the son of Azriel Brainin and had moved to Berlin by 1901.

Brainin contributed to the periodicals Ha-Meliẓ, Ha-Toren, Ha-Ẓefirah, Ha-Maggid, and Ha-Shiloaḥ. In 1895 he issued a periodical under the title "Mi-Mizraḥ u-Mi-Ma-arav" (From East and West), of which only four numbers appeared.

Brainin was the author of several pamphlets, the most important of which were his sketch of Pereẓ Smolenskin's life and works (Warsaw, 1896); and a translation of M. Lazarus' essay on Jeremiah (Warsaw, 1897). He also wrote about one hundred biographical sketches of modern Jewish scholars and writers. He was the first biographer of Theodor Herzl He died in New York City.

== Published works ==
To "Aḥiasaf" Brainin contributed the following articles:

- "Ilane Sraḳ" (Barren Trees) (i. 32)
- "Bar Ḥalafta" (ii. 71)
- "Dappim Meḳuṭṭa'im" (Loose Leaves) (v. 120).

He also contributed to the same periodical the following biographical sketches:

- Moritz Lazarus (iv. 214)
- Rabbi Moritz Güdemann (iv. 219)
- Theodor Herzl (v. 222)
- Israel Zangwill (v. 233)
- Max Nordau (v. 247)
