= List of members of the International Law Commission =

The United Nations' International Law Commission is composed of 34 elected members:

== Current members ==
(for 2023–2027)

Carlos J. Argüello Gómez	Nicaragua	2017–
Bogdan Aurescu	Romania	2017–
Yacouba Cissé	Ivory Coast	2017–
Patrícia Galvão Teles	Portugal	2017–
Claudio Grossman Guiloff	Chile	2017–
Huang Huikang	People's Republic of China	2010–
Charles C. Jalloh	Sierra Leone	2017–
Ahmed Laraba	Algeria	2012–
Hong Thao Nguyen	(Vietnam) Viet Nam	2017–
Georg Nolte	Germany	2007–
Nilüfer Oral	Turkey	2017–
Hassan Ouazzani Chahdi	Morocco	2017–
August Reinisch	Austria	2017–
Juan José Ruda Santolaria	Peru	2017–
Marcelo Vázquez-Bermúdez	Ecuador	2007–2011 2013–
Evgeny Zagaynov	Russia	2018–
Masahiko Asada	Japan	2023-
Dapo Akande	United Kingdom of Great Britain and Northern Ireland	2023-
Ahmed Amin Fathalla	Egypt	2023-
Rolf Einar Fife	Norway	2023-
George Rodrigo Bandeira Galindo	Brazil	2023-
Keun-Gwan Lee	(South Korea) Republic of Korea	2023-
Vilawan Mangklatanakul	Thailand	2023-
Andreas D. Mavroyiannis	Cyprus	2023-
Ivon Mingashang	Democratic Republic of the Congo	2023-
Giuseppe Nesi	Italy	2023-
Phoebe Okowa	Kenya	2023-
Mario Oyarzábal	Argentina	2023-
Mārtiņš Paparinskis	Latvia	2023-
Bimal N. Patel	India	2023-
Penelope Ridings	New Zealand	2023-
Alioune Sall	Senegal	2023-
Louis Savadogo	Burkina Faso	2023-
Munkh-Orgil Tsend	Mongolia	2023-

== Past members ==
Sir Michael Wood	United Kingdom	2008–2022
Amos S. Wako	Kenya	2007–2022
Eduardo Valencia Ospina	Colombia	2006–2022
Dire D. Tladi	South Africa	2012–2022
Pavel Šturma	Czech Republic	2012–2022
Gilberto Vergne Saboia	Brazil	2007–2022
Aniruddha Rajput	India	2017–2022
Ernest Petric	Slovenia	2007–2022
Chris M. Peter	Tanzania	2012–2022
Ki Gab Park	Republic of Korea	2012–2022
Sean D. Murphy	United States	2012–2022
Shinya Murase	Japan	2009–2022
Marja Lehto	Finland	2017–2022
Mahmoud D. Hmoud	Jordan	2007–2022
Hussein A. Hassouna	Egypt	2007–2022
Juan Manuel Gómez-Robledo	Mexico	2012–2022
Concepción Escobar Hernández	Spain	2011–2022
Ali Mohsen Fetais Al-Marri	Qatar	2002–2022
Emmanuel Nii Akwei Addo	Ghana	1997–2006
Mohammed Bello Adoke	Nigeria	2011–2016
Roberto Ago	Italy	1957–1978
Bola Adesumbo Ajibola	Nigeria	1987–1991
Richard Osuolale A. Akinjide	Nigeria	1982–1986
Husain M. Al-Baharna	Bahrain	1987–2006
Fernando Albonico	Chile	1967–1971
Gonzalo Alcivar	Ecuador	1970–1972
George H. Aldrich	United States	1981
Ricardo J. Alfaro	Panama	1949–1953
Awn S. Al-Khasawneh	Jordan	1987–1999
Riyadh Mahmoud Sami Al-Qaysi	Iraq	1982–1991
Gilberto Amado	Brazil	1949–1969
Gaetano Arangio-Ruiz	Italy	1985–1996
João Clemente Baena Soares	Brazil	1997–2006
Mikuin Leliel Balanda	Zaire	1982–1986
Julio Barboza	Argentina	1979–1996
Yuri G. Barsegov	Soviet Union	1987–1991
Milan Bartoš	(Socialist Federal Republic of Yugoslavia) Yugoslavia	1957–1973
Mohammed Bedjaoui	Algeria	1965–1981
John Alan Beesley	Canada	1987–1991
Mohamed Bennouna	Morocco	1987–1998
Alia Suat Bilge	Turkey	1972–1976
Boutros Boutros-Ghali	Egypt	1979–1991
Derek William Bowett	United Kingdom	1992–1996
James Leslie Brierly	United Kingdom	1949–1951
Herbert W. Briggs	United States	1962–1966
Ian Brownlie	United Kingdom	1997–2008
Marcel Cadieux	Canada	1962–1966
Lucius Caflisch	Switzerland	2007–2016
Carlos Calero-Rodrigues	Brazil	1982–1996
Juan José Calle y Calle	Peru	1973–1981
Enrique J.A. Candioti	Argentina	1997–2016
Jorge Castañeda	Mexico	1967–1986
Erik Castrén	Finland	1962–1971
Choung II Chee	(South Korea) Republic of Korea	2002–2006
Pedro Comissario Afonso	Mozambique	2002–2016
Roberto Córdova	Mexico	1949–1954
James Richard Crawford	Australia	1992–2001
Emmanuel Kodjoe Dadzie	Ghana	1977–1981
Riad Daoudi	Syria	2002–2006
John de Saram	Sri Lanka	1992–1996
Leonardo Díaz González	Venezuela	1977–1991
C. John R. Dugard	South Africa	1997–2011
Constantin P. Economides	Greece	1997–2001; 2003–2006
Douglas L. Edmonds	United States	1954–1961
Gudmundur Eiriksson	Iceland	1987–1996
Abdullah El-Erian	Egypt	1957–1958; 1962–1978
Nabil Elaraby	Egypt	1994–2001
Taslim Olawale Elias	Nigeria	1962–1975
Faris El-Khouri	Syria	1949–1961
Abdelrazeg El-Murtadi Suleiman Gouider	Libya	2012–2016
Khalafalla El Rasheed Mohamed-Ahmed	Sudan	1982–1986
Nihat Erim	Turkey	1959–1961
Paula Escarameia	Portugal	2002–2010
Constantin Th. Eustathiades	Greece	1967–1971
Jens Evensen	Norway	1979–1984
Luigi Ferrari Bravo	Italy	1997–1998
Gerald Fitzmaurice	United Kingdom	1955–1960
Constantin Flitan	Romania	1982–1986
Salifou Fomba	Mali	1992–1996; 2002–2011
Mathias Forteau	France	2012–2016
Laurel B. Francis	Jamaica	1977–1991
J.P.A. François	Netherlands	1949–1961
Giorgio Gaja	Italy	1999–2011
Zdzisław Galicki	Poland	1997–2011
Francisco V. García Amador	Cuba	1953–1961
Raul I. Goco	Philippines	1997–2001
Bernhard Graefrath	(East Germany) German Democratic Republic	1987–1991
André Gros	France	1961–1963
Mehmet Güney	Turkey	1992–1996
Gerhard Hafner	Austria	1997–2001
Edvard Hambro	Norway	1972–1977
Francis Mahon Hayes	(Republic of Ireland) Ireland	1987–1991
Qizhi He	People's Republic of China	1994–2001
Mauricio Herdocia Sacasa	Nicaragua	1997–2001
Shushi Hsu	(Taiwan) Republic of China	1949–1961
Jiahua Huang	People's Republic of China	1985–1986
Manley O. Hudson	United States	1949–1953
Kamil E. Idris	Sudan	1992–1996; 2000–2001
Adegoke Ajibola Ige	Nigeria	died before start of term
Luis Ignacio-Pinto	Benin	1967–1969
Jorge E. Illueca	Panama	1982–1991; 1997–2001
Marie G. Jacobsson	Sweden	2007–2016
Andreas J. Jacovides	Cyprus	1982–1996
S. P. Jagota	India	1977–1986
Eduardo Jiménez de Aréchaga	Uruguay	1960–1969
Peter C.R. Kabatsi	Uganda	1992–2001; 2002–2006
Maurice Kamto	Cameroon	1999–2016
Victor Kanga	Cameroon	1962–1964
James Lutabanzibwa Kateka	Tanzania	1997–2006
Richard D. Kearney	United States	1967–1976
Fathi Kemicha	Tunisia	2002–2011
Thanat Khoman	Thailand	1957–1959
Kriangsak Kittichaisaree	Thailand	2012–2016
Roman A. Kolodkin	Russia	2003–2011 2015–2018
Vladimir M. Koretsky	Soviet Union	1949–1951
Abdul G. Koroma	Sierra Leone	1982–1993
Martti Koskenniemi	Finland	2002–2006
Feodor I. Kozhevnikov	Soviet Union	1952–1953
Sergei B. Krylov	Soviet Union	1954–1956
Mochter Kusuma-Atmadja	Indonesia	1992–2001
Valery I. Kuznetsov	Russia	2002
Manfred Lachs	Poland	1962–1966
José M. Lacleta Muñoz	Spain	1982–1986
Hersch Lauterpacht	United Kingdom	1952–1954
Chieh Liu	People's Republic of China	1962–1966
Igor Ivanovich Lukashuk	Russia	1995–2001
Antonio de Luna	Spain	1962–1966
Ahmed Mahiou	Algeria	1982–1996
Chafic Malek	Lebanon	1982–1986
William Mansfield	New Zealand	2002–2006
Alfredo Martínez Moreno	El Salvador	1973–1976
Michael J. Matheson	United States	2003–2006
Ahmad Matine-Daftary	Iran	1957–1961
Stephen C. McCaffrey	United States	1982–1991
Donald M. McRae	Canada	2007–2016
Teodor Meleşcanu	Romania	1997–2001 2003–2011
Václav Mikulka	Czechoslovakia	1992–1998
Djamchid Momtaz	Iran	2000–2006
Zhengyu Ni	People's Republic of China	1982–1984
Bernd H. Niehaus	Costa Rica	2002–2016
Frank X.J.C. Njenga	Kenya	1976–1991
Motoo Ogiso	Japan	1982–1991
Didier Opertti Badán	Uruguay	1997–2006
Luis Padilla Nervo	Mexico	1955–1963
Radhabinod Pal	India	1952–1966
Guillaume Pambou-Tchivounda	Gabon	1992–2006
Ángel Modesto Paredes	Ecuador	1962–1966
John J. Parker	United States	1954
Stanisław Pawlak	Poland	1987–1991
Alain Pellet	France	1990–2011
A. Rohan Perera	Sri Lanka	2007–2011
Obed Pessou	Benin	1962–1966
Christopher Walter Pinto	Sri Lanka	1973–1981
Syed Sharifuddin Pirzada	Pakistan	1982–1986
Robert Q. Quentin-Baxter	New Zealand	1972–1984
Alfred Ramangasoavina	Madagascar	1967–1976
Pemmaraju Sreenivasa Rao	India	1987–2006
Benegal Narsing Rau	India	1949–1951
Edilbert Razafindralambo	Madagascar	1982–1996
Paul Reuter	France	1964–1989
Willem Riphagen	Netherlands	1977–1986
Patrick Lipton-Robinson	Jamaica	1992–1996
Víctor Rodríguez Cedeño	Venezuela	1997–2006
Shabtai Rosenne	Israel	1962–1971
Robert Rosenstock	United States	1992–2003
Zenon Rossides	Cyprus	1972–1976
Emmanuel J. Roucounas	Greece	1985–1991
José María Ruda	Argentina	1964–1972
Milan Sahovic	(Socialist Federal Republic of Yugoslavia) Yugoslavia	1974–1981
Carlos Salamanca Figueroa	Bolivia	1954–1956
A.E.F. Sandström	Sweden	1949–1961
Georges Scelle	France	1949–1960
Stephen M. Schwebel	United States	1977–1980
Bernardo Sepúlveda Amor	Mexico	1997–2005
César Sepúlveda Gutiérrez	Mexico	1987–1991
José Sette Câmara	Brazil	1970–1978
Jiuyong Shi	People's Republic of China	1987–1993
Bruno Simma	Germany	1997–2002
Ian Sinclair	United Kingdom	1982–1986
Nagendra Singh	India	1967–1972
Narinder Singh	India	2007–2016
Luis Solari Tudela	Peru	1987–1991
Jean Spiropoulos	Greece	1949–1957
Constantin A. Stavropoulos	Greece	1982–1984
Sompong Sucharitkul	Thailand	1977–1986
Alberto Szekely	Mexico	1992–1996
Abdul Hakim Tabibi	Afghanistan	1962–1981
Arnold J. P. Tammes	Netherlands	1967–1976
Doudou Thiam	Senegal	1970–1999
Peter Tomka	Slovakia	1999–2002
Christian Tomuschat	West Germany	1985–1996
Senjin Tsuruoka	Japan	1961–1981
Grigory I. Tunkin	Soviet Union	1957–1966
Nikolai A. Ushakov	Soviet Union	1967–1986
Endre Ustor	Hungary	1967–1976
Sir Francis Vallat	United Kingdom	1973–1981
Edmundo Vargas Carreño	Chile	1992–1996 2007–2011
Stephen C. Vasciannie	Jamaica	2007–2011
Alfred Verdross	Austria	1957–1966
Vladlen Vereshchetin	Russia	1992–1994
Stephen Verosta	Austria	1977–1981
Francisco Villagrán Kramer	Guatemala	1992–1996
Humphrey Waldock	United Kingdom	1961–1972
Nugroho Wisnumurti	Indonesia	2007–2016
Xue Hanqin	People's Republic of China	2002–2010
Chusei Yamada	Japan	1992–2008
Alexander Yankov	Bulgaria	1977–1996
Mustafa Kamil Yasseen	Iraq	1960–1976
Jesús María Yepes	Colombia	1949–1953
Kisaburo Yokota	Japan	1957–1960
Jaroslav Zourek	Czechoslovakia	1949–1961
