= Kiljunen =

Kiljunen is a Finnish surname. Notable people with the surname include:

- Anneli Kiljunen (born 1957), Finnish politician
- Jaakko Kiljunen (born 1980), Finnish actor
- Kimmo Kiljunen (born 1951), Finnish politician
- Marja-Liisa Kiljunen (born 1950), Finnish diplomat

== See also ==
- That Kiljunen Family (1981), Finnish musical comedy film
