= Marja Lehto =

Marja Lehto (born 1959) is Ambassador and Senior Expert at the Legal Service of the Ministry for Foreign Affairs of Finland.

== Career ==
Since 2014, Dr Lehto chairs the Executive Board of Justice Rapid Response. She has chaired the Committee of Experts on Terrorism (CODEXTER), Council of Europe (2006–2007), the working groups on sanctions (RELEX, Sanctions formation) and terrorism (COTER) of the Council of the European Union (during the Finnish Presidency of the EU 2006), and the Special Committee on the Charter of the United Nations and on the Strengthening of the Role of the Organisation, New York (1999). She led the negotiations on the Law of the Sea resolution of the UN General Assembly in 1998 and 1999.

Dr Lehto has served as the ambassador of Finland to Luxembourg (2009–2014), as the Director of the Unit for Public International Law (2000–2009), as a Counsellor at the permanent Mission of Finland to the United Nations (1995–2000), as a Counsellor and First and Secretary Secretary in the Unit for Public International Law (1992–1995) and in the Unit for Treaty Law (1991–1992), at the Embassy of Finland in Paris (1987–1990).

Dr Lehto has participated in numerous international negotiations and conferences, including the conferences leading to the establishment of the International Criminal Court. From 2017 to 2022, she was a member of the International Law Commission.

Marja Lehto serves as president of the Finnish Red Cross since June 2026.

Dr Lehto holds a Ph.D. in international law (University of Lapland 2008), Master of Laws (University of Helsinki 1984), Master of Political Science (University of Helsinki 1989). She is married and has one son.

== Publications ==
- Indirect Responsibility for Terrorist Acts. Redefinition of the Concept of Terrorism Beyond Violent Acts. The Erik Castrén Institute Monographs on International Law and Human Rights, Vol. 9, Martinus Nijhoff Publishers, Leiden 2009, 480 p.
- International Responsibility for Terrorist Acts: A Shift Towards More Indirect Forms of Responsibility. Acta Universitatis Lapponiensis 139, Lapland University Press 2008, 556 p.
- Voimankäytön oikeutus. Selvitys eduskunnan ulkoasiainvaliokunnalle. Legal Grounds for the Use of Force. A report submitted to the Foreign Relations Committee of the Parliament. October 2015, 85 p.
- Itämeren turvallisuusjärjestelmä erityisesti oikeudellisen säännöstön kehityksen kannalta (The Baltic Sea security regime from the point of view of legal regulations), A report submitted to the Advisory Board on Disarmament, April 1986, 86 p.
- Naiset ja kehitys (Women and Development), ed. together with Marja-Liisa Kiljunen, Gaudeamus 1982, 2nd edition 1985, 189 p.
- Battle of Ideas, Delivery of Justice; How Justice Rapid Response contributes to the 'Project of International Criminal Justice', Regions and Cohesion, Vol. 5, Issue 2, 2015, p. 114–126
- ‘The Crime of Terrorism and the Emerging Framework of International Criminal Law: Reflections on the “Hierarchy of Evil”’, Finnish Yearbook of International Law, Volume 19 (2008), Hart Publishing, Oxford & Portland, Oregon, 2010, p. 183–216
- ‘War on Terror – Armed Conflict with Al-Qaida?’, Nordic Journal of International Law 78 (2009), p. 1–13
- ’La coopération dans le domaine de la pêche en mer Baltique’, Revue de L´Indémer 1997, Nr 5, p. 117–132
- ‘The Privilege of Universality: International Law, Economic Ideology and Seabed Resources’, Nordic Journal of International Law 65 (1996), Kluwer Law International, p. 533–555 (together with Martti Koskenniemi)
- ‘Succession of States in the Former Soviet Union – Arrangements Concerning the Bilateral Treaties of Finland and the USSR’, Finnish Yearbook of International Law IV (1993), Helsinki, 1993, p. 194–227
- ‘La succession d´États dans l´Éx-URSS, en ce qui concerne particulièrement les relations avec la Finlande’, Annuaire Français de Droit International XXXVIII (1992), Editions de CNRS, Paris, p. 179–219 (together with Martti Koskenniemi)
- ‘Restrictions on Military Activities in the Baltic Sea – A Basis for a Regional Regime?’, Finnish Yearbook of International Law II (1991), Helsinki, 1991, p. 38–65
- ‘Scarcity and Resources Policy: The Case of Deep Sea Mining’, Development and Peace, Vol. 6, No. 2 (1985), p. 201–229 (together with Lauri Siitonen).
- 'Slowly but Surely? The Challenge of the Responsibility to Protect', in Rain Liivoja and Jarna Petman (ed.), International Lawmaking. Essays in Honour of Jan Klabbers, Routledge, Abingdon/New York, 2014, p. 283–297
- 'Kansainvälinen oikeus ja terrorismi: Liian paljon vai liian vähän?' (International law and terrorism: too much or too little?), in Kari Laitinen (ed.), Tuhat ja yksi uhkaa, Tulkintoja terrorismista, Poliisiammattikorkeakoulun julkaisuja 6/2007, p. 119–131
- 'Achille Laurosta Al Qaidaan – merenkulun terrorismisopimuksen muutokset' (From Achille Lauro to Al Qaida – Amendments to the Convention on Maritime Terrorism), in Timo Koivurova (ed.), Kansainvälistyvä oikeus, juhlakirja professori Kari Hakapää, Lapin yliopistopaino 2005, p. 285–306
- 'The ICC and the Security Council: About the Argument of Politicization', in Mauro Politi and Giuseppe Nesi (ed.), The International Criminal Court and the Crime of Aggression, Ashgate, 2004, p. 145–150
- 'Terrorism in International Law – an Empty Box or Pandora´s Box?', in Jarna Petman and Jan Klabbers (ed.), Nordic Cosmopolitanism: Essays in International Law for Martti Koskenniemi, Kluwer Law, International, Martinus Nijhoff Publishers, Leiden 2003, p. 219–314
- 'Finland and the Law of the Sea', in Tullio Treves and Laura Pineschi (ed.), The Law of the Sea. The European Union and its Member States: Publications on Ocean Development, Vol. 28, Kluwer Law International, 1997, p. 127–150 (together with Martti Koskenniemi)

== See also ==
- War and environmental law
