= André Gros =

French diplomat and Judge on the International Court of Justice

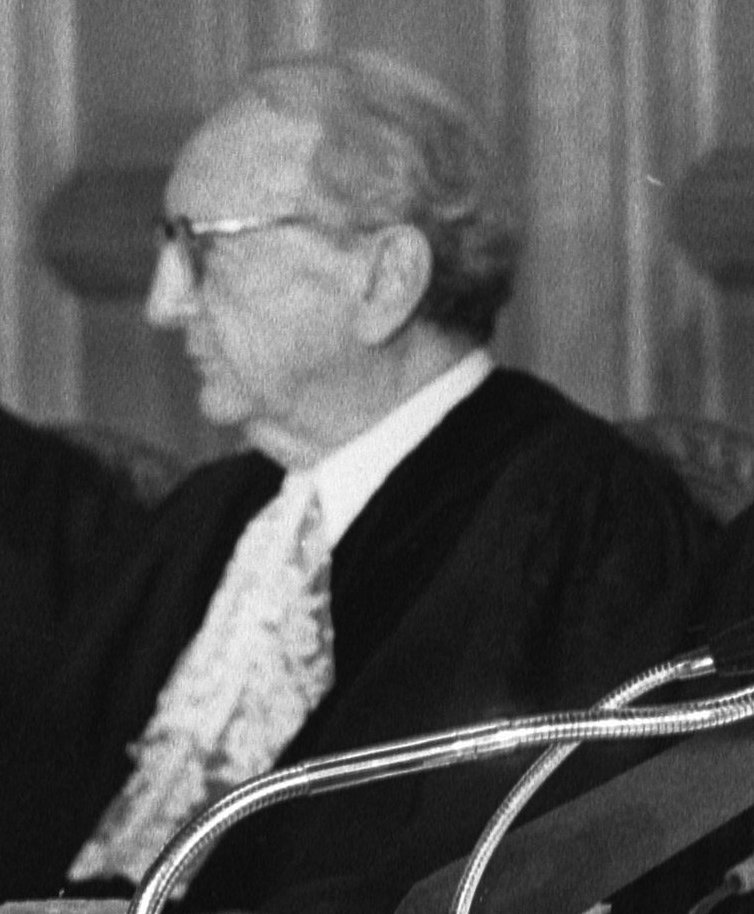
- Gros in 1979, as a judge of the International Court of Justice

Judge of the International Court of Justice
- In office 1964–1982
- Preceded by: Jules Basdevant
- Succeeded by: Guy de Lacharrière

Personal details
- Born: May 19, 1908 Douai, France
- Died: 22 April 2004 (aged 95) Paris, France
- Occupation: diplomat, jurist

André Paul Adolphe Gros (Douai, 1908 May 19– 2004 April 22) was a French jurist and diplomat. He was a professor at several French universities and a legal advisor to the Ministry of Foreign Affairs. He also served as a diplomat at the United Nations and was a member of the Permanent Court of Arbitration and a judge of the International Court of Justice (ICJ).

== Academic career ==
Gros was born in 1908, the son of honorary prosecutor Maurice Gros and Adèle Gros (née Berr). He studied law in at the University of Lyon and then in Paris.

In 1931, he became a lecturer at the Sorbonne. He defended his doctoral thesis on 8 June 1932 entitled "Survivance de la raison d’État" before an academic jury composed of dean Henri Berthélémy (fr), Achille Mestre and Julien Laferrière. He was subsequently appointed professor in Nancy (1935) and Toulouse (1937). After completing his habilitation in 1938, he taught economy at the University of Rio de Janeiro from 1939 to 1941. Although he was dismissed by the Vichy regime in 1940, he became a tenured professor of law in 1942. He also taught at the newly establish École nationale d'administration between 1957 and 1949, an in 1952. In 1959 he taught a course at the Hague Academy of International Law the conservation of the biological resources of the high seas.

== Diplomatic career ==
In addition to his academic career, he was active as a diplomat. Beginning in 1939, he held various positions at the Ministry of Foreign Affairs. For example, starting in 1940, he served as legal advisor at the French embassy in London; from 1943 to 1948, he was a representative to the United Nations War Crimes Commission; in 1946 as legal advisor to the French delegation at the Paris Peace Conference, and from 1947 to 1963, he worked as legal advisor at the Ministry of Foreign Affairs.

He was designated as a member of the Permanent Court of Arbitration in The Hague by the decree of 4 October 1950 (together with Georges Scelle). Gros was elected as a member of the United Nations International Law Commission 1961, to fill the casual vacancy following the death of Scelle, and served as the Commission’s First Vice-Chairman during its Fourteenth Session in 1962. He held the office until 1963, when he was elected to the International Court of Justice. From 1964 to 1982, he served two full nine-year terms as a judge on the International Court of Justice in The Hague.

He also sat as an arbitrator. From 1971 to 1977, he served as a member of the Arbitral Tribunal in the Beagle Channel dispute between Argentina and Chile. He was member of the tribunal in a case on the delimitation of the continental shelf between the United Kingdom and France between 1975 and 1978 (in which his successor at the ICJ, Guy Ladreit de Lacharrière served as counsel for France). Furthermore, he was an arbitrator in the 1989 maritime boundary delimitation case between Guinea-Bissau and Senegal which was later challenged before the International Court of Justice.

== Honours ==
Gros was named a Commander of the Legion of Honour by the French government and admitted as an Honorary Bencher by the Inner Temple, one of the four Inns of Court of England and Wales. Beginning in 1959, he was a member of the Institut de droit international, and he presided over its 1979 session in Athens as chairman. The American Society of International Law named him an honorary member in 1983.

== Personal life ==
He married Dulce Simoes Correa (1908–2011) on 11 May 1940, whom he likely met during his tenure in Brazil, and they had two sons, François and Marcel.

== Selected publications ==
- Survivance de la raison d’Etat, Paris, Dalloz, 1932, 390 p.
- Les problèmes politiques de l’Europe, London, 1943, 160 p.
- Traités et documents diplomatiques (with Paul Reuter), Paris, PUF, 1960, 500 p., the last revised, 5th edition published in 1982)
- La Convention sur la pêche et la conservation des ressources biologiques de la Haute mer, RCADI, vol. 97, 1959, pp. 1–90. (the published version of his course at the Hague Academy)
