= War and environmental law =

War can heavily damage the environment, and warring countries often place operational requirements ahead of environmental concerns for the duration of the war. Some international law is designed to limit this environmental harm.

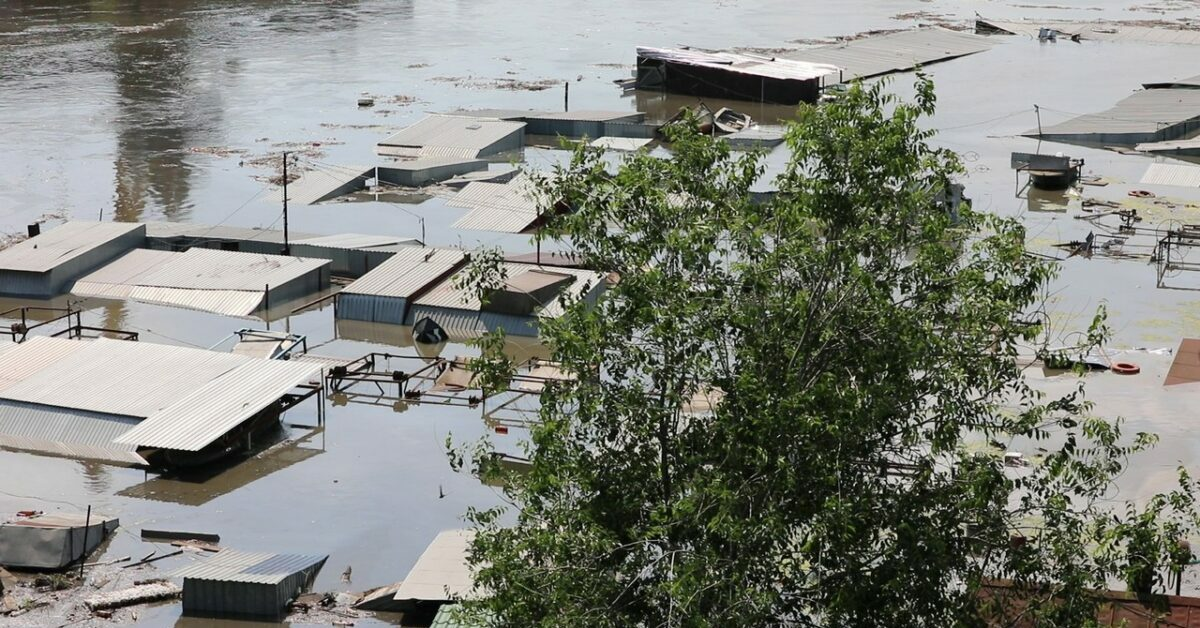
Flooding in Kherson after the Kakhovka Dam, under control by Russia's military during the Russian invasion of Ukraine, was blown up.

War and military activities have obvious detrimental impacts on the environment. Weaponry, troop movements, land mines, creation and destruction of buildings, destruction of forests by defoliation or general military usage, poisoning of water sources, target-shooting of animals for practice, consumption of endangered species out of desperation etc., are just some of the examples of how both war and peacetime military activities (such as training, base construction, and transportation of weaponry) harm the environment. "Scorched earth" and "poisoning the well" are classical examples of such impact. Recent examples include the oil dump and fire by Iraq in Kuwait 1990/1991, depleted uranium use in Kosovo 1999, air fuel explosives use in Afghanistan since 2001.

From a legal standpoint, environmental protection during times of war and military activities is addressed partially by international environmental law. Further sources are also found in areas of law such as general international law, the laws of war, human rights law and local laws of each affected country. However, this article is chiefly focused on the environment and as soon as two countries are battling it out, the issue becomes one of international concern. Thus, international environmental law that the United Nations Security Council enforces is the focus here. The law of armed conflict is not very well developed in comparison to other areas of international law. Only the United Nations Security Council has the authority and the jurisdiction to regulate its development and implementation, or to monitor its observance.

== Sources of rules ==
=== Customary international law and soft law ===
Customary international law and soft law documents address the protection of the environment during times of armed conflict and military activities. The International Law Commission (ILC) has drafted a Code of Offences Against the Peace and Security of Mankind (1954).

"Man and his environment must be spared the effects of nuclear weapons and all other means of mass destruction. States must strive to reach prompt agreement, in the relevant international organs, on the elimination and complete destruction of such weapons": Principle 26 of the 1972 Stockholm Declaration → Chapter 11 of the Brundtland Report: Peace, Security, Development, and the Environment. World Charter of Nature 1982: "Nature shall be secured against degradation caused by warfare or other hostile activities."

"Warfare is inherently destructive of sustainable development. States shall therefore respect international law providing protection for the environment in times of armed conflict and cooperate in its further development, as necessary": Principle 24 1992 Rio Declaration → paragraph 39.6 of the Agenda 21: "measures in accordance with international law should be considered to address, in times of armed conflict, large-scale destruction of the environment that cannot be justified under international law".

UN General Assembly Resolution 47/37 (1992) provides: "[D]estruction of the environment, not justified by military necessity and carried out wantonly, is clearly contrary to existing international law."

=== Treaty law ===
Several United Nations treaties, including the Fourth Geneva Convention, the 1972 World Heritage Convention and the 1977 Environmental Modification Convention have provisions to limit the environmental impacts of war or military activities.

Iraq was liable under international law for the 'environmental damage and the depletion of natural resources' resulting from the unlawful invasion and occupation of Kuwait: United Nations Security Council Resolution 687 (1991).

"Destruction of the environment, not justified by military necessity and carried out wantonly, is clearly contrary to existing international law": UN General Assembly Resolution 47/37 (1992).

==== 1977 Environmental Modification Convention ====
The Environmental Modification Convention is an international treaty prohibiting the military or other hostile use of environmental modification techniques having widespread, long-lasting or severe effects. The Convention bans weather warfare, which is the use of weather modification techniques for the purposes of inducing damage or destruction. This treaty is in force and has been ratified (accepted as binding) by leading military powers. The treaty has only limited ratification. It prohibits parties from engaging in 'military or any other hostile use of environmental modification techniques having widespread, longlasting or severe effects as the means of destruction, damage or injury' to any other party ← Agent Orange use in Vietnam.

==== Other relevant treaties ====
- 1925 Geneva Gas Protocol
- 1949 Geneva Convention IV art. 53(4) ← Hague Regulations art. 23(g): prohibition of destruction by occupying power except absolute military need
- 1972 Biological Weapons Convention
- 1980 Convention on Certain Conventional Weapons and its 5 protocols: Protocol III (incendiary weapons) art. 2(4) (forest and plant cover); 2003 Protocol V (clearance of explosive remnants) ← 1997 Anti-Personnel Mines Convention (Ottawa Treaty); → 2008 Convention on Cluster Munitions
- 1972 World Heritage Convention
- 1993 Chemical Weapons Convention: not covering herbicides or effects on flora

== Application of the law ==
=== International law of war and armed conflict and general rules of environmental protection ===
The starting point is that the natural environment is a civilian object under international humanitarian law. Unless otherwise provided, inhabitants and belligerents are "under the protection and the rule of the principles of the law of nations, as they result from the usages established among civilised peoples, from the laws of humanity and the dictates of public conscience": 'Martens Clause' (Preamble, 1907 Hague Convention IV Respecting the Laws and Customs of War on Land). Art. 22 limits the right of belligerents to adopt means of injuring the enemy.

Arts. 35(3) (prohibition of methods) and 55 (due care) of 1977 Additional Protocol I to the Geneva Conventions (wide but not universal ratification) provide additional protection for the environment. "Taken together, these provisions embody a general obligation to protect the natural environment against widespread, long-term and severe environmental damage; the prohibition of methods and means of warfare which are intended, or may be expected, to cause such damage; and the prohibition of attacks against the natural environment by way of reprisals": para 31, ICJ Advisory Opinion on Nuclear Weapons 1996; see also ICJ applications Yugoslavia v UK 1999, DR Congo v Rwanda 2002.

"Uganda, by acts of looting, plundering and exploitation of Congolese natural resources committed by members of the Ugandan armed forces in the territory of the Democratic Republic of the Congo and by its failure to comply with its obligations as an occupying Power in Ituri district to prevent acts of looting, plundering and exploitation of Congolese natural resources, violated obligations owed to the Democratic Republic of the Congo under international law": ICJ judgment DR Congo v Uganda (Armed Activities on the Territory of the Congo) 2005.

"Works or installations containing dangerous forces, namely dams, dykes and nuclear electrical generating stations, shall not be made the object of attack, even where these objects are military objectives, if such attack may cause the release of dangerous forces and consequent severe losses among the civilian population.": art. 15 of the 1977 Additional Protocol II (non-international armed conflicts, less widely ratified than AP I); similarly art. 56(1) of the 1977 Additional Protocol I for international armed conflicts.

"Intentionally launching an attack in the knowledge that such attack will cause incidental loss of life or injury to civilians or damage to civilian objects or widespread, long-term and severe damage to the natural environment which would be clearly excessive in relation to the concrete and direct overall military advantage anticipated" is a war crime, being a "serious violations of the laws and customs applicable in international armed conflict, within the established framework of international law": art. 8(2)(b)(iv) Rome Statute of the International Criminal Court.

To summarize: "The general principles on the conduct of hostilities apply to the natural environment: A. No part of the natural environment may be attacked, unless it is a military objective. B. Destruction of any part of the natural environment is prohibited, unless required by imperative military necessity. C. Launching an attack against a military objective which may be expected to cause incidental damage to the environment which would be excessive in relation to the concrete and direct military advantage anticipated is prohibited": ICRC Customary IHL Rule 43 (Application of General Principles on the Conduct of Hostilities to the Natural Environment). Some states insist such rules (incl. Additional Protocol I) only apply to conventional weapons and do not apply to nuclear weapons. See also Rules 44 (due regard) and 45 (serious damage).

ILC Draft Principles on protection of the environment in relation to armed conflicts: Special Rapporteur Marie G. Jacobsson considered from 2013 to 2015 obligations before, during, and after an armed conflict and proposed 5 draft jus in bello principles (proportionality, distinction, precaution, no reprisal, protected zones) among others. Special Rapporteur Marja Lehto continued in 2018 with some 21 draft principles covering all 3 phases plus occupation. As of mid-2019, some 28 principles (incl. re non-state actors) have been provisionally adopted by the Drafting Committee with the following parts: Introduction – Principles of general application – Principles applicable during armed conflict – Principles applicable in situations of occupation – Principles applicable after armed conflict.

=== International environmental law during war and armed conflict ===
Some environmental treaties have express provisions about military and conflicts; others need to rely on rebus sic stantibus (art. 62 VCLT) to interpret during wartime → 2011 ILC Draft Articles on the Effects of Armed Conflict on Treaties: environmental treaties continue unless express provision otherwise.

==== Thermonuclear war ====
The International Court of Justice advisory opinion on the Legality of the Threat or Use of Nuclear Weapons considered the environment as a minor issue in regard to the legality of thermonuclear war but it did not find all thermonuclear war to be prohibited.

"The Court does not consider that the treaties in question could have intended to deprive a State of the exercise of its right of self-defence under international law because of its obligations to protect the environment. Nonetheless, States must take environmental considerations into account when assessing what is necessary and proportionate in the pursuit of legitimate military objectives. Respect for the environment is one of the elements that go to assessing whether an action is in conformity with the principles of necessity and proportionality": para 30, ICJ Advisory Opinion on Nuclear Weapons 1996.

== Organisations ==
International organisations with environmental mandates may be called upon during times of armed conflict to assist with mediating or remedying damage caused by armed conflict, e.g. UN Environment Programme (UNEP), the World Health Organization, the International Civil Aviation Organization, the International Maritime Organization (IMO), and the International Committee of the Red Cross. The UN Security Council has also demonstrated environmental concern in deliberations on recent conflicts, for example, during the 1991 Gulf War. UNEP and IMO were also involved in this conflict, attempting to remedy the most serious of the environmental impacts.
