= Marja-Liisa Kiljunen =

Finnish diplomat

Marja-Liisa Kiljunen (born Mäkinen on 17 August 1950 in Heinola) is a Finnish diplomat and economist. She has been Finnish Ambassador to Lithuania and Belarus from 2008 to 2012.

== Biography ==
Kiljunen studied political history at the University of Helsinki, earning a Master's degree in 1978. She then worked as a researcher at the University of Helsinki, with a focus on development economics and regional integration.

Kiljunen entered the diplomatic service of the Finnish Ministry for Foreign Affairs in 1983. After a field position in Nairobi, Kenya, she worked at the ministry in Helsinki in relations with international organizations. Her positions included Director of the Unit for EU Coordination and Finnish representative in the Committee of Senior Officials of the Council of the Baltic Sea States. She also worked for the World Institute for Development Economics Research (WIDER), a UN research institute headquartered in Helsinki, and at the UNICEF Headquarters in New York. She also took outreach positions as Executive Director of the Finnish United Nations Association and Secretary General of Social Democratic Women in Finland, the women's branch of the Social Democratic Party of Finland.

On 1 November 2004, she was appointed Ambassador of Finland to Kazakhstan and Turkmenistan. This role was then extended as roving ambassador to Kyrgyzstan, Tajikistan, and Uzbekistan, and from 2004 to 2005 to Mongolia.

On 1 September 2008, Kiljunen was named Ambassador of Finland to Lithuania, presenting her credentials on 17 September 2008. She was the fourth ambassador since the restoration of Lithuania's independence in 1991. She was also accredited to Belarus, with Finland opening a representative office in Minsk on 1 October 2010.

During her tenure in Vilnius, the country celebrated the millennium of the name of Lithuania in 2009, as Vilnius was the European Capital of Culture. A new embassy building was inaugurated, also hosting the embassy of Norway and the residence of the ambassador of Japan. During this time, Finland and Lithuania strengthened their defence and economic bonds, and the Nordic model of gender equality and minority rights gained influence in Lithuania.

== Personal life ==
Kiljunen married social-democratic politician and fellow researcher Kimmo Kiljunen in 1972. They filed for divorce on 21 October 2008. They raised two daughters, Rauha and Riikka and two sons, Veikko and actor Jaakko.

== Publications ==
- Seers, Dudley; Schaffer, Bernard; Kiljunen, Marja-Liisa (1979). Underdeveloped Europe: Studies in Core-Periphery Relations. Sussex: The Harvester Press Ltd.
- Seers, Dudley; Vaitsos, Constantine; Kiljunen, Marja-Liisa, eds. (1980). "Regional Disparities and Policy in the EEC". Integration and unequal development: The experience of the EEC. pp. 199–222.
- Green, Reginald; Kiljunen, Marja-Liisa; Kiljunen, Kimmo, eds. (1981). Namibia: the last Colony. Harlow: Longman.
- Seers, Dudley; Vaitsos, Constantine; Kiljunen, Marja-Liisa, eds. (1982). The Second Enlargement of the EEC. The Integration of Unequal Partners. London: Macmillan.
