= Bimal N. Patel =

Indian legal scholar and university director

His Excellency Professor (Dr.) Bimal N. Patel
- Official portrait of Professor (Dr.) Bimal N. Patel, Vice-Chancellor of Rashtriya Raksha University

Judge of the International Tribunal for the Law of the Sea
- In office 2026 – Current

Member of the UN International Law Commission Chairman, Working Group on Succession of States in respect of State Responsibility
- In office 1 January 2023 – 31 December 2027

Vice-Chancellor, Rashtriya Raksha University, Gujarat, India
- In office 20 January 2020 – Present

Director, Gujarat National Law University, Gujarat, India
- In office 8 November 2008 – 15 July 2019

Personal details
- Born: 29 June 1970 (age 56) Khadol, Gujarat, India
- Education: PhD, LLM (International Law, Leiden University, the Netherlands); PhD (International Law, Jaipur National University, India); MA (International Relations, University of Amsterdam, the Netherlands); Post Graduate Studies in International Law and Relations (the Hague, Oslo, Heidelberg)
- Profession: International Law Jurist, Advisor, Law-making, Academic & Institutional leadership
- Website: rru.ac.in www.itlos.org legal.un.org

Bimal N. Patel is Judge International Tribunal for the Law of the Sea (ITLOS) in June 2026 for the term 2026-2035, and takes office on 1 October 2026. He is an International Law Jurist, academician, administrator, and international relations scholar. He is Chairman of the Working Group on “Succession of States in respect of State Responsibility” and has been a member of the International Law Commission (ILC) of the United Nations since 1 January 2023,

He is the Vice-Chancellor and Professor of International Law of Rashtriya Raksha University. Patel has been serving as a Member of the National Security Advisory Board, an advisory board to the National Security Council headed by the Prime Minister of India since 2015. He is a member of the Financial Sector Regulatory Appointments Search Committee (FSRASC), Appointments Committee of the Cabinet, headed by the Cabinet Secretary. Patel served as the Director of the Gujarat National Law University from 2008 to 2019. He served as the Lead Academic Adviser to India during India's tenure as a member of the UN Security Council 2021-22. He serves as a member of High-Level Advisory Board of the ICRC concerning Global Initiative on International Humanitarian Law. He is a member of the Editorial Board of the ICRC International Review of the Red Cross, Geneva. Patel is co-chair of the American Society of International Law Interest Group on Law of the Sea and a Member of Antarctica Environment Protection and Governance Committee, Government of India. He has obtained multilateral legal and international relations experience at the Organisation for the Prohibition of Chemical Weapons (OPCW), which was awarded 2013 Nobel Peace Prize, for its extensive work to eliminate chemical weapons and the International Criminal Tribunal for former Yugoslavia, preparing the international humanitarian and international criminal law jurisprudence, the Hague, the Netherlands. Patel served at the United Nations Of Youth (UNOY), an international youth NGO, in its founding years in early 1990s, supporting the mission of Nikolai Firioubine, Maria Kooijman and Ute Roehl, founding members. UNOY was awarded recently in 2026, Luxembourg Peace Prize as the Outstanding Peace Organisation, recognized for advancing youth participation in conflict transformation and global policy reform.

Patel is the author or editor of more than thirty books and reference works on international dispute settlement, the law of the sea, the responsibility of international organisations and Indian state practice, published by Brill/Nijhoff, Kluwer Law International, Oxford University Press, Routledge and Eastern Book Company. He contributed a chapter on the history of international law in India in The Oxford Handbook of the History of International Law, edited by Bardo Fassbender and Anne Peters, the book won 2014 Certificate of Merit of the American Society of International Law.

== Early life and education ==
Patel was born on 29 June 1970 in Khadol, Gujarat, India. He completed undergraduate studies in agricultural science at Gujarat Agricultural University before moving to the Netherlands for graduate study. He obtained a Master of Arts in international relations from the University of Amsterdam and a Master of Laws (LL.M.) in international Law from Leiden University, where he subsequently completed a PhD in international law. He was awarded a second doctorate in international law and governance by Jaipur National University, supervised by Professor V. S. Mani. He also undertook postgraduate studies in international law and international relations at institutions in The Hague, Oslo and Heidelberg, including a postgraduate diploma in international relations and development at the Institute of Social Studies, The Hague, and a summer-school certificate in international relations, foreign policy and government at the University of Oslo.

== Career ==
=== Organisation for the Prohibition of Chemical Weapons (1995-2008) ===
From 1995 to 2008 Patel served legal, human resources and international cooperation divisions at the Organisation for the Prohibition of Chemical Weapons in The Hague.

=== Gujarat National Law University (2008-2019) ===
Professor Bimal N. Patel speaking at the Gujarat National Law University (GNLU), where he served as Director from 2008 to 2019.

Patel served as the Director of Gujarat National Law University for two consecutive terms from 2008 to 2019. His core responsibilities included establishment of world class national law university in Gujarat, academic and research affairs, financial management, administration and statutory compliance, and resource mobilisation. During his tenure GNLU established a campus of approximately 50 acres provided by the Government of Gujarat, with reported assistance of between US$35 million and US$40 million, and the university began receiving development grants from the University Grants Commission. Patel introduced what he described as a “research-based teaching university” and “research-based administrative university” model; initiated LL.M., PhD, diploma, certificate and online programmes; and developed executive training programmes for institutions of legislation, governance and the judiciary, the defence forces, corporate bodies and non-governmental organisations. He established endowed chairs and fellowships in fields including law of the sea, intellectual property rights, mergers and acquisitions, labour law, real estate, energy law, environment and sustainable development, and international contracts, and contributed to a corpus and savings fund reported at approximately US$4 million. Under his directorship GNLU hosted an external programme of the Hague Academy of International Law and a global maritime conference attended by judges of the International Court of Justice and ITLOS and by diplomats from various countries. The eighth edition of the GNLU International Moot Court Competition was held in 2016 in collaboration with the Competition Commission of India.

=== Rashtriya Raksha University (2019-present) ===
Professor Bimal N. Patel in his office serving as the Vice-Chancellor of Rashtriya Raksha University (RRU) in Lavad-Gandhinagar.

Professor Patel has been serving as the Director-General and later on as the Vice-Chancellor of the Rashtriya Raksha University (www.rru.ac.in), an Institute of National Importance under the Ministry of Home Affairs since 2020. At RRU he brings his unique experience from the National Security Advisory Board and previous multilateral and national experience to promote vision of global security education for peace, security and humanity. He provides leadership in all aspects of academic, research, training and outreach programmes across various schools covering internal security and police administration; law, social science and humanities; coastal, maritime, air and space security; artificial intelligence and cyber security; foreign affairs, languages and political economy; criminology and behavioural science; and military affairs, strategies and logistics. His responsibilities include teaching and the supervision of LL.M. and doctoral candidates; executive management of university resources and administration, guiding the Pro Vice-Chancellor, Deans, Directors of Schools and the Registrar; the development of international academic partnerships, executive training and research programmes; affiliation and accreditation of defense forces, para-military organisations, central police organisations and state police organisations, and the establishment of endowed chairs and fellowships in collaboration with international and national corporate entities, government departments, public sector undertakings, law firms and public trusts.

== International Law Commission ==
=== Election ===
Professor Bimal N. Patel addressing an event at the Permanent Mission of India to the United Nations in New York.

Patel was elected to the International Law Commission for a five-year term beginning 2023-2027, and He received 163 votes out of 192 members present and voting the highest tally in the Asia-Pacific Group Patel became the eighth Indian national to serve on the Commission, a body of thirty-four experts of recognised competence in international law responsible for the progressive development and codification of international law.

=== Work of the Commission ===
- Patel is Chairman of the Working Group on Succession of States in respect of State Responsibility. He is also a member of the Working Group on the Long-Term Programme of Work and the Working Group on Methods of Work, and has served on the Drafting Committee for the following topics:
- Immunity of State Officials from Foreign Criminal Jurisdiction
- Settlement of Disputes to which International Organizations are Parties
- General Principles of Law
- Subsidiary Means for the Determination of Rules of International Law
- Non-Legally binding International Agreements
- He is a member of the Study Group on Sea-Level Rise in relation to International Law.

== International Tribunal for the Law of the Sea ==
=== ITLOS Judge Election ===
Patel has been elected as a Judge of the ITLOS for the 2026-2035 term. The Ministry of External Affairs described the result as a significant milestone and thanked member states for their support; the Minister of External Affairs, S. Jaishankar, also congratulated him. He takes office on 1 October 2026, which adjudicates disputes concerning the interpretation and application of UNCLOS.

Professor Bimal N. Patel (third from left) with H.E. Ambassador Harish P. and the Indian delegation at the Mahatma Gandhi bust, United Nations Headquarters, New York, captured after winning the election of ITLOS in June 2026.

== Other public and advisory roles ==
=== National security and foreign policy ===
- Member, National Security Advisory Board, National Security Council Secretariat, Prime Minister’s Office (since 2016)
- Lead Academic Adviser, India’s membership of the United Nations Security Council (2021-22)
- Member, Committee on Antarctic Governance and Environment Protection, Government of India
- Member, Board of Governors, National Maritime Foundation
- Member, Selection Panel for Overseas Chairs, Indian Council for Cultural Relations, Ministry of External Affairs

=== Law reform and dispute resolution ===
- Member, 21st Law Commission of India (2015-2018)
- Member, Global Advisory Board, Centre of Excellence in Alternative Dispute Resolution, Indian Institute of Corporate Affairs, Ministry of Corporate Affairs
- Life Individual Member, Indian Council of Arbitration

=== Financial and corporate governance ===
- Member, Financial Sector Regulatory Appointments Search Committee, Appointments Committee of the Cabinet, Government of India
- Member of search panels concerning appointments at the Reserve Bank of India and the Securities and Exchange Board of India
- Public Interest Director, NSE Data & Analytics, Indices, ESG Ltd.
- Public Interest Director, CareEdge Rating Limited
- Member, Board of Governors, Charotar University of Science and Technology

=== International humanitarian law and professional bodies ===
- Member, High-Level Advisory Board, ICRC Global IHL Initiatives - Humanities in War
- Member, Group of Experts, San Remo Manual on International Armed Conflicts at Sea
- Co-Chair, American Society of International Law Interest Group on Law of the Sea
- Member, Editorial Board, International Review of the Red Cross, ICRC

=== Legislative drafting and law-making ===
Patel has been engaged by the United Nations, the Government of India and the Government of Gujarat as an adviser to ministries and departments, and has been deputed to research, draft and present international, national and state-level legislation. Instruments on which he has worked include:

- Antarctic Act of India;
- Maritime Anti-Piracy Act of 2022;
- Merchant Shipping Code;
- Deep Seabed Mining Bill of India;
- Private Maritime Security Companies Rules;
- Inland Vessels Act
- The Admiralty (Jurisdiction and Settlement of Maritime Claims) Act 2017
- Corporate Social Responsibility Policy for Public Sector Undertakings;
- Acts establishing universities such as Law Commission of Gujarat Statute, Gujarat Sports University, Children University, Indian Institute of Teachers’ Education, Gujarat State Litigation Policy; Gujarat Ombudsman (Lokayukta) Bill; Zero Landfill Regulations for 15 Wastes; Temple Trust Bill; Gujarat State Law Commission

=== Law Commission of India- preparation of reports and consultations experience ===
As a member of the 21st Law Commission of India, Patel contributed to the preparation of reports and consultations on the Uniform Civil Code; the Torture Bill; tribunalisation of justice; the Advocates Act, 1961; a Bail Act; betting and gambling; compulsory registration of marriages; contempt of court; criminal justice reforms; decriminalisation of defamation; DNA profiling; obsolete laws; food adulteration; and sedition laws.

=== Advisory and research work in international litigation ===
As an international law jurist, Patel has examined, prepared and published the administrative, procedural and substantive jurisprudence of the International Court of Justice (The Hague), the International Tribunal for the Law of the Sea (Hamburg), the International Criminal Tribunal for the former Yugoslavia (The Hague) and the International Labour Organization Administrative Tribunal (Geneva).

== Honours ==
Patel has lectured, taught or held visiting appointments at the Hague Academy of International Law; the Xiamen Academy of International Law; the International Foundation for the Law of the Sea, Hamburg; the University of Barcelona (Visiting Professor); The Hague University (faculty member); Tel Aviv University (Visiting Scholar, invitee); the University of Mauritius (External Examiner); the University of Malaya (Visiting Associate Professor); Sardar Patel University, V. V. Nagar (Adjunct Professor); the MIT School of Government, Pune (Visiting Professor and Adviser); the University of Cambridge; the Institute of Social Studies, The Hague; Erasmus University Rotterdam School of Law; the University of Oslo; the University of Rome, La Sapienza; the University of Auckland; and the University of New South Wales, Sydney. He has also been designated a resource person for the United Nations Institute for Training and Research (UNITAR), Geneva. He served as a member of the International Law Association Committee on the Teaching of International Law; a life member and honorary European coordinator of the Indian Society of International Law; a member of the American, Australian and New Zealand, Indian and European societies of international law and of the Netherlands Association of International Law (NVIR); and a member of the Indian Law Institute (Gujarat Chapter). His teaching and research covers undergraduate and postgraduate levels and the supervision of doctoral scholars and diploma programmes in international law, the law of the sea and international organisations, among other fields, drawing on some thirty years of combined experience in academic leadership, juristic work in general international law, the law of the sea and maritime law, international courts and tribunals, international organisations, national security and foreign policy at both multilateral and national levels.

== Selected works ==
=== Dispute settlement: international and national courts and tribunals ===
- The World Court Case-Law Digest and Reference Guide, 3rd ed., foreword by Judge Peter Tomka (Brill, forthcoming 2026)
- The World Court Reference Guide and the Case-Law Digest 2000-2010, 2nd ed., foreword by President Peter Tomka, ICJ (The Hague: Nijhoff, 2014)
- The World Court Reference Guide: Judgments, Advisory Opinions and Orders of the PCIJ and ICJ (1922-2000), 1st ed., introduction by Shabtai Rosenne (The Hague: Kluwer Law International, 2002) - nominated for the Certificate of Merit of the American Society of International Law
- A Commentary - International Litigation by and against India before the ICJ, PCA, ITLOS and WTO, forewords by Alain Pellet and Upendra Baxi (Eastern Book Company, 2018)
- Fiscal’s Friend - International Criminal Tribunal for Former Yugoslavia Jurisprudence: ICTY Case-Law Digest (The Hague: ICTY, 2002)

=== Law of the sea and maritime law ===
- ITLOS Jurisprudence - 2026 Edition (Eastern Book Company, forthcoming 2026)
- Law of the Sea and Maritime Law, Governance and Operational Issues: India - A Maritime Power Perspective (Eastern Book Company, 2026)
- “Land-Locked Countries’ Perspective on the Sustainable Partnership for the Future of Ocean Governance”, commemoration of the 43rd anniversary of the entry into force of UNCLOS, Rashtriya Raksha University, 9 December 2025
- “Emerging Issues in the Marine Environment and the Law of the Sea”, 2nd International Conference on Ocean Governance, University of Ghana, September 2025
- “UNCLOS and Climate Change: ITLOS Advisory Opinion No. 31”, Indian Journal of International Law, 2025
- International Tribunal for the Law of the Sea (ITLOS) Jurisprudence (1994-2014): Case Commentary, Case-Law Digest and Reference Guide, forewords by President Peter Tomka, ICJ, and Judge David Attard, ITLOS (Eastern Book Company, 2015)
- “Maritime Security and Sustainable Development and the Coastal Communities of India”, in Niels Blokker et al. (eds.), Liber Amicorum Nico Schrijver: Furthering the Frontiers of International Law - Sovereignty, Human Rights, Sustainable Development (Leiden: Nijhoff, 2021), 247-263
- “Indian Presidency of the UN Security Council: Strengthening of a Comprehensive Maritime Security Normative Framework and Developments”, 11 AALCO Journal of International Law (2022-23), 15-23
- Indian Ocean and Maritime Security: Cooperation, Competition and Threats, ed. with William Nunes and Aruna Malik, foreword by Manohar Parrikar, Defence Minister of India (Routledge, 2016)
- Report on the Obligations under the UNCLOS - National Legislative Implementation Compliance Assessment of India (September 2017)
- Sustainable Development and India: Convergence of Law, Politics, Economics and Science, ed. with Ranita Nagar (Oxford University Press, 2017)
- “Sustainable Development and Marine Environment - A Preview of Legal Issues in India”, in Sustainable Development and India (Oxford University Press, 2017)
- Marine Environment Law and Practice of China, India, Japan and Republic of Korea, Xiamen Academy of International Law (Leiden: Nijhoff, 2017)
- “Implementation of the Freedom of Navigation and the Law of the Sea: Prospects of Naval Competition and Cooperation in the Indian Ocean”, US Naval War College Workshop, Hawaii, 12-13 January 2016
- “Good Order at Sea: Stability in the Indian Ocean”, UGC Centre for Maritime Studies, University of Pondicherry, February 2016
- “The Bay of Bengal - Bangladesh-India Arbitration Award: Continuation of Dispute”, Military Law and Operations Edition 2016, US Department of Defense, Vancouver, March 2016
- “State Practices on Antarctica and International Law: Attempt at Identification of India’s Interests, Needs and Concerns”, in P. S. Goel, R. Ravindra and S. Chattopadhyay (eds.), Science and Geopolitics of the White World: Arctic-Antarctic-Himalaya (Springer, 2016), 33-49
- “Eight Dimensions of Maritime Security Law and Practice among Member States of the Indian Ocean Rim Association”, Law of the Sea Institute, University of Berkeley, Spain Proceedings, 2015
- “Law of the Sea: Maritime Security Enforcement and Jurisdictional Issues for the Indian Ocean Rim Association (IORA) Member States”, Journal of the Indian Ocean Region (Routledge, 2014)
- Legal Road Map for Exploring and Exploiting Resources in the Indian Ocean, Ministry of Earth Sciences, Government of India
- Global Maritime Security and Anti-Piracy: Issues and Challenges 2011, with Hitesh Thakker and Asha Verma (New Delhi: Eastern Book Company, 2012)

=== International organisations ===
- “Accountability of International Organisations in International Law Applicable to Cyber Operations”, in Michael Schmitt (ed.), Tallinn Manual 2.0 on the International Law Applicable to Cyber Operations (Cambridge University Press, 2017)
- Responsibility of International Organisations: Regime of Legal Obligations between the United Nations, the World Bank, the International Atomic Energy Agency and the European Union, foreword by C. F. Amerasinghe (New Delhi: Eastern Book Company, 2013)
- A Comprehensive Guide on the Laws of Human Rights in Commonwealth Countries (New Delhi: Wadhwa Publications, 2007)

=== State practice and international law ===
- Treaty Law and Practice of Africa and Asia, Indian Council of World Affairs (forthcoming)
- National Security of India and International Law, foreword by Henry Kissinger and Ajit Doval, National Security Adviser of India, introduction by Professor John Norton Moore, Virginia Law School (Brill, 2020)
- National Security Act(s) of India: Legal, Judicial and Inter-Disciplinary Perspective (Rashtriya Raksha University, 2023)
- International Law in the Supreme Court of India (in preparation)
- Central Acts of India, 1834-2019 (New Delhi: Eastern Book Company, 2019)
- The State Practice of India and the Development of International Law: Dynamics of Interplay between Foreign Policy and Jurisprudence (Leiden-Boston: Brill, 2016)
- India and International Law, vol. 1 (The Hague: Kluwer Law International, 2005)
- India and International Law, vol. 2 (The Hague: Nijhoff, 2008)
- “History of International Law in India between 1500-1945”, in Bardo Fassbender, Anne Peters and Simone Peter (eds.), The Oxford Handbook of the History of International Law (Oxford University Press, 2012) - winner of the Certificate of Merit of the American Society of International Law

=== General international, national and state law ===
- “80 Years of the ICJ - Bridging the Gap between Developed and Developing Nations in Accessing International Justice”, 3rd Forum, Beijing, September 2025
- “Overview of the Work of the ILC on General Principles of Law and Way Forward”, report of the AALCO webinar on General Principles of Law and AALCO Member States, New Delhi, 2023
- The Companies Act 2013: Key Conceptual Transformation, ed. with Mamta Biswal and Dharmishta Raval (Universal Law Publishing, 2017)
- Evolving Environmental Law Jurisprudence and the Supreme Court of India: Selected Cases, with Prachi Motiyani (Eastern Book Company, 2016)
- International Contracts: Jurisdictional Issues and Global Commercial and Investment Governance, with Mamta Biswal and Joshua Aston (GNLU, 2014)
- Indian Banking Law, with Dolly Jabbal and Prachi Motiyani (Eastern Book Company, 2014)
- Food Security Laws: Interdisciplinary Perspectives, with Ranita Nagar and Hitesh Thakker (Eastern Book Company, 2014)
- Economic Analysis of Law: An Indian Perspective, with Ranita Nagar and Hitesh Thakker (LexisNexis, 2014)
- Explaining and Understanding Legal and Interdisciplinary Research Methodology in India (GNLU, Gandhinagar, 2012)
- Indo-US Relations: Nine Months After President Obama’s Visit, with William Nunes and Aruna Kumar Malik (GNLU, Gandhinagar, 2012)
- Legal Guidelines for the Reduction, Recycling and Reuse of Waste (editor), research report for the Ministry of Environment and Forest, Government of Gujarat (GNLU, Gandhinagar, 2012)
- Draft Statute of the Gujarat State Law Commission, research bill for the Ministry of Law and Justice, Government of Gujarat (GNLU, Gandhinagar, 2011)
- Foreign Trade (Development and Regulation) Amendment Act, 2010, research paper for the Ministry of Commerce and Trade, Government of India (GNLU, Gandhinagar, 2010)
- Law, Politics and Development: Issues, Challenges and Solutions in the 21st Century of India (general editor) (Eastern Book Company, 2012)
- Separation of Powers between the Executive and the Judiciary Wings of India and Judicial Accountability, with Mamta Biswal and Jaya Hemnani (GNLU, Gandhinagar, 2012)
- Journey of Women Empowerment: Miles to Go!, with Mamta Biswal and Anand Kumar Tripathi (GNLU, Gandhinagar, 2012)
- Live-In Relationship and Surrogacy: Legal Implications and Social Issues, with Mamta Biswal and Anand Kumar Tripathi (GNLU, Gandhinagar, 2012)
- “Integrated Maritime Defence Policy and Strategy of India: Some Critical Ideas for Preparing a Blue-Print for India”, with Aruna Kumar Malik, Soumya Priyadarshinee and Udita Kanwar (Eastern Book Company, Delhi, 2012)

=== Selected journal articles and contributions to books ===
- “India and the United Nations Reform (2005-2006): An Insightful Interplay between International Relations and International Law”, in B. N. Patel (ed.), India and International Law, vol. 2 (Leiden: Nijhoff, 2008), 49-97
- “International Court of Justice and India”, in B. N. Patel (ed.), India and International Law (Leiden: Nijhoff, 2005), 289-318
- “Laws for the 21st Century India”, seminar of the Bureau of Parliamentary Studies, Gujarat Legislative Assembly, Gandhinagar, 31 October 2009
- “Recommendations on the Enhancement of the Role and Effectiveness of the International Court of Justice and State Practice: Gap between Recommendations and Practice (1971-2006)”, Singapore Yearbook of International Law, 2008
- “Some Reflections from Personal Experience on the Promotion of Teaching and Research of International Law”, Indian Society of International Law International Seminar, 10 December 2007
- “The Concept of Peace Dividend and Chemical Weapons Disarmament”, 42 Indian Journal of International Law 2 (2005)
- “Can India Afford to Remain a Non-Member of the Hague Conference on Private International Law?”, Second International Law Conference, Indian Society of International Law Proceedings, November 2004
- “Principles and Practices of ‘Good Governance’ and the Chemical Weapons Convention: Role of the OPCW”, Sixth Hague Joint Conference on Contemporary Issues of International Law, 2003
- “Resolution 1540 and the Non-Proliferation of Weapons of Mass Destruction”, African Yearbook of International Law, 2003
- “La Cour internationale de Justice plus sollicitée et plus active que jamais”, Revue d’analyse juridique de l’actualité internationale, 2002
- “Judicial and Administrative Activities of the ICJ - Year 2001”, 42 Indian Journal of International Law 3 (2002)
- “Renaissance of the International Court of Justice: An Overview of the Judicial and Administrative Activities of the ICJ in 2000”, 41 Indian Journal of International Law 2 (2001)
- “Theory and Practice: Implementation of the Chemical Weapons Convention Destruction Regime”, 11 The Non-Proliferation Analysis Journal (Summer 2000)
- “Accountability of International Organisations: A Case Study of the Organisation for the Prohibition of Chemical Weapons”, 13 Leiden Journal of International Law 3 (2000)
- “Protection Zones in International Humanitarian Law”, 4 Indian Journal of International Law 39 (1999)
- “Do the Rules of Evidence and Procedure of the International Criminal Tribunal for the former Yugoslavia Ensure a Fair Trial?”, 3 Indian Journal of International Law 39 (1999)

=== Selected lectures, conference papers and commentary ===
- “Why does the World Bank want to broker Indus water talks between India and Pakistan?”, The Indian Express, 16 September 2017
- “Deliberating or Guessing Far-Sighted Solutions of the Emerging International Banking and Investment Issues and Challenges - Is this Realistic?”, GNLU Conference on International Banking and Investment, 22 July 2012
- “Indo-Japanese Relations: Future Trends”, GNLU Centre for Foreign Policy and Security Studies, 31 January 2012
- “Fragmentation of International Law: An Indian Perspective”, Taipei Conference of International and Comparative Law, Taipei, 30-31 December 2011
- “Teaching and Research of International Law in Asia: A Holistic Approach in the 21st Century”, 4th Asian Society of International Law Annual Conference, Beijing, 28 August 2011
- “India-Australia Relations: Moving from Predicament to Permanency”, GNLU Centre for Foreign Policy and Security Studies, 3 October 2011
- “Indo-US Relations: 1998 to 2010 and from 2010 Onwards - Nine Months after President Obama’s Visit to India”, GNLU Centre for Foreign Policy and Security Studies, 21 August 2011
- “Non-State Challenges to Higher Education: Foreign and Private Universities”, West Zone Vice-Chancellors’ Conference, Udaipur, 29 July 2011
- “India-Singapore Bilateral Relations: A Strong Trading and Political Partner in ASEAN”, GNLU Centre for Foreign Policy and Security Studies, 25 July 2011
- “India-Indonesia Bilateral Relations: A Strong Trading and Political Partner in ASEAN”, GNLU Centre for Foreign Policy and Security Studies, 20 July 2011
- “Legal Awareness on Obligations and Rights of Prisoners and Prison Administration”, Bureau of Police Research and Development, Ministry of Home Affairs, SPIPA, Ahmedabad, 23 March 2011
- “Post-Doha Linkage between International Trade and Competition: Policy and Practice of Developed and Developing Countries”, GNLU Conference on International Trade and Competition Law, Gandhinagar, 5-6 March 2011
- “Value Oriented Higher Education System: Higher Education System in India”, International Conference on Higher Education, Pandit Deendayal Petroleum University, 25 November 2010
- “Good Governance in the Higher Educational System in India: International Practices and Lessons”, UGC-AIU All India Vice-Chancellors’ Conference, 85th Annual Meeting of the Association of Indian Universities, Bharati Vidyapeeth, Pune, 14 November 2010
- “International Courts and Tribunals: An Indian/Asian Perspective”, GNLU Centre for Public International Law, 3 October 2010
- “Ethics and Values in Higher Education and Challenges of Globalisation”, Western Zone Vice-Chancellors’ Conference, M. S. University, Vadodara, September 2010
- “Legal Infrastructure for the 21st Century of India”, Gujarat Magazine, June 2010
- “India’s Participation in the Hague Conference on Private International Law”, GNLU Centre on Private International Law, 10 April 2010
- “Importance of a National Sports Law Centre for the Growth and Development of the Sports Industry in India”, GNLU Centre for Sports Law, Gandhinagar, 20 March 2010
- “Interdependence of Criminology and Forensic Science Management in the Administration of Criminal Justice”, Gujarat Forensic Science University, Gandhinagar, 6 March 2010
- “Post-1991 Liberalisation Policies and Programmes and Impacts on the Reduction of Regional Disparity in India”, Interdisciplinary National Seminar on Inclusive Growth and Development, Gujarat University, Ahmedabad, 26 February 2010
- “Does international law offer a remedy to a state which has been and will repeatedly be a victim of terrorist attacks?”, Daily News and Analysis, 2010
- “Peaceful Coexistence through Sustainable Development - Need to Minimize Ecological Imbalance, Pollution and Uncontrolled Exploitation of Natural Resources”, Round Table Conference, MAEER’s MIT, Pune, 31 January 2010
- “Industry and Business Pro-activeness can Mould an Effective IPR Policy”, Y. J. Trivedi - AMA Academy for Intellectual Property Rights, Ahmedabad, 23 January 2010
- “Legal Issues of Non-Resident Indians (NRIs) and People of Indian Origin (PIOs): Challenges and Possible Solutions”, Vigyan Bhavan, New Delhi, 7 January 2010
- “Concerns, Needs and Interests Shaping the Future of Indian Foreign Policy”, Gujarat University, Ahmedabad, 9 December 2009
- “Food Security and Agro-Economy in the Developing Nations: The Millennium Development Goals”, GNLU Centre for Food Security and Agro-Economy, 10 October 2009
- “Role of Media in Realizing Developed India Vision 2020”, Media & Law Training Programme, Townhall, Gandhinagar, 11 September 2009
- “Role of the Mediation Mechanism in Dealing with the Problem of Pending Cases - Why and How”, GNLU, Gandhinagar, 5 September 2009
- “Importance of the Role of Rule of Law and Ethics in Business Practices and MBA Professional Studies”, Mahavir Business College, Veer Narmad South Gujarat University, 8 August 2009
- “Human Rights and Value Education in India”, Saurashtra University, Rajkot, 27 March 2009
- “Pressing Concerns of the Contemporary Legal World: International Law Today, For a Global Tomorrow”, GNLU First International Seminar, Gandhinagar, 31 January 2009

== Recognition ==
- Certificate of Merit, American Society of International Law - for “History of International Law in India between 1500-1945” in The Oxford Handbook of the History of International Law
- Nomination for the Certificate of Merit, American Society of International Law - for The World Court Reference Guide (2002)

== See also ==
- List of members of the International Law Commission
- International Tribunal for the Law of the Sea
- India and the United Nations
- Rashtriya Raksha University
