= A. Rohan Perera =

Sri Lankan lawyer and diplomat

Amrith Rohan Perera, PC (born 1947) is a Sri Lankan lawyer and diplomat, and former Permanent Representative of Sri Lanka to the United Nations since April 2015. He was a former legal adviser to the Ministry of Foreign Affairs and Chairman of the United Nations Ad Hoc Committee on Comprehensive Convention on International Terrorism. He is a current member of the International Law Commission Perera has also served as a member of the Lessons Learnt and Reconciliation Commission and adviser to the All Party Representatives Committee.

He joined the Ministry of Foreign Affairs as an assistant legal adviser. In a 32-year career Perera negotiated several bi-lateral and multilateral treaties in areas of foreign trade, investment, maritime boundary regimes, mutual legal assistance and extradition on behalf of the Government of Sri Lanka.

He has served as a visiting lecturer in International Law at the Faculty of Law, University of Colombo, Bandaranaike International Diplomatic Training Institute and at the General Sir John Kotelawala Defence University. He is a member of the Editorial Board of the Manchester Journal of International Economic Law, the Law College Law Review and the Sri Lanka Journal of International Law

== See also ==
- International Law Commission
- Comprehensive Convention on International Terrorism
- Lessons Learnt and Reconciliation Commission
