= Mario Oyarzabal =

Argentinian diplomat (born 1969)

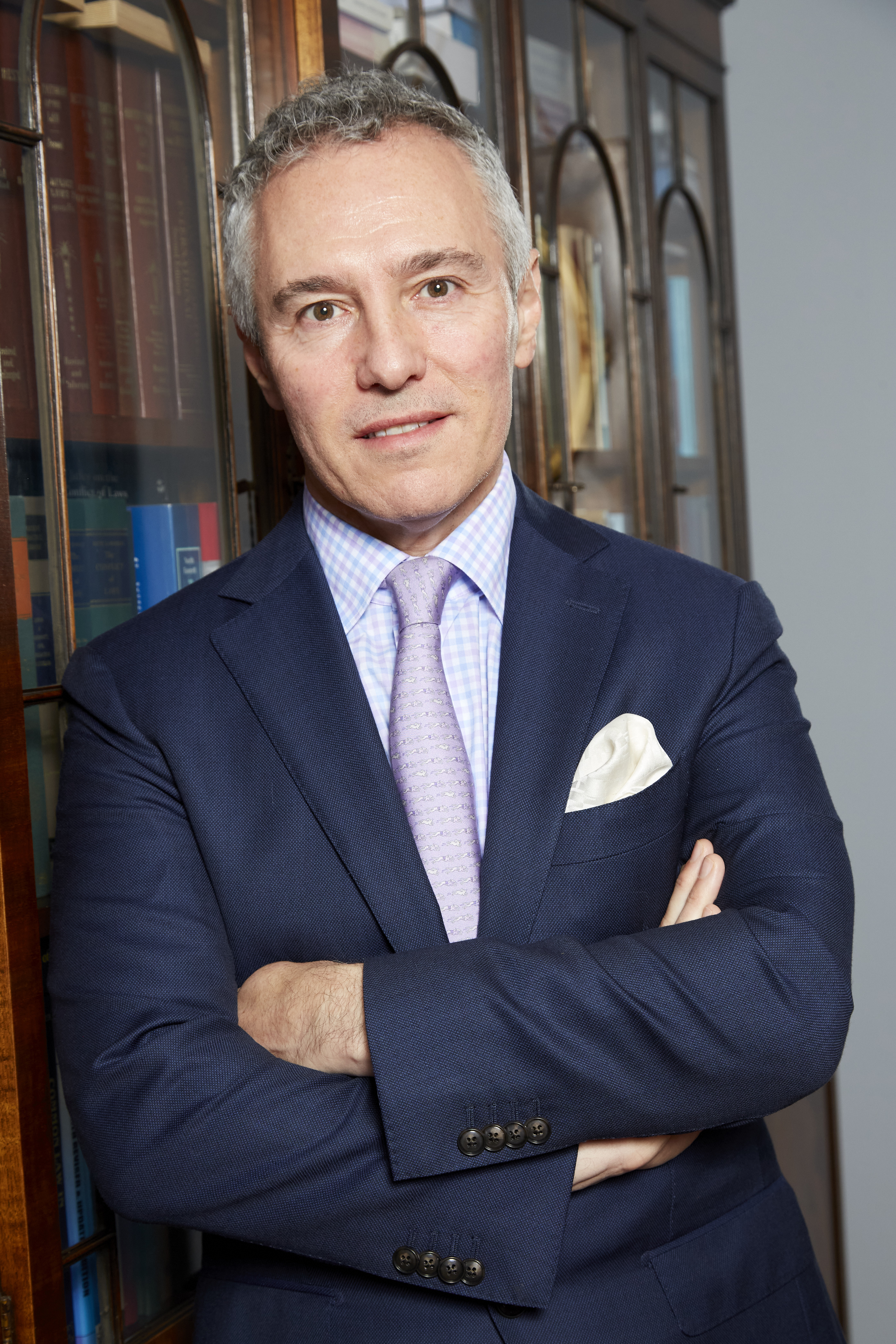
- Oyarzabal in 2023

The Legal Adviser to the Argentine Foreign Ministry
- Incumbent
- Assumed office Since 2025
- Preceded by: Rosa Delia Gómez Duran
- In office 2016–2020
- Preceded by: Susana Ruiz Cerutti
- Succeeded by: Holger Federico Martinsen

Member of the International Law Commission
- Incumbent
- Assumed office 2023
- Preceded by: Enrique J.A. Candioti

Argentine Ambassador to the Netherlands
- In office 2020–2025
- Preceded by: Héctor Horacio Salvador

Personal details
- Born: Mario Javier Agustín Oyarzabal; February 4, 1969 (age 57) Azul, Buenos Aires Province, Argentina
- Education: National University of La Plata, Harvard University

Mario Oyarzabal (born February 4, 1969, in Azul, Argentina) is an Argentine jurist, diplomat and professor. Since 2025, he is the Director General of the International Law Department and Legal Adviser of the Ministry of Foreign Affairs, International Trade and Worship of the Argentine Republic, a position he had previously held from 2016 to 2020. Between 2020 and 2025, he served as Argentina's ambassador to the Netherlands and as the permanent representative to the Organization for the Prohibition of Chemical Weapons (OPCW). Previously, he was the Deputy Permanent Representative to the United Nations Security Council from 2013 to 2014.

Oyarzabal is a generalist in public and private international law. He taught a special course at The Hague Academy of International Law in 2020 and will teach the general course in 2029. He is the author of numerous publications in specialized journals both in Argentina and internationally.

In 2021, Oyarzabal was elected as a member of the United Nations International Law Commission for the 2023–2027 term. He was elected Chairperson of the commission's Drafting Committee in 2025.

In 2023, Oyarzabal was elected as an Associate Member of the Institute of International Law during its 81st session in Angers, France.

He is the General Editor of the Latin American and Caribbean Journal of International Law, which he co-founded with Diego Fernández Arroyo in 2024.

In 2025, he was decorated Knight Grand Cross of the Order of Orange-Nassau by King Willem-Alexander of the Netherlands.

== Education ==
Oyarzabal graduated as a lawyer in 1991 and as a notary public in 1992 from the National University of La Plata. He joined the Argentine Foreign Service Institute, graduating in 1996. In 2005, he earned a Master of Laws (LL.M.) degree from Harvard University.

== Diplomatic career ==
Oyarzabal joined the Argentine Foreign Service in 1997. He has held various roles, including serving in the Department of Parliamentary Affairs at the Foreign Ministry (1997–1998), the Consulate General in New York (1998–2004 and 2005–2007), the Legal Department of the Foreign Ministry (2007–2011 and 2016–2020), the Permanent Mission to the United Nations (2011–2016), and the Argentine Embassy in the Netherlands (2020–2025).

In 2018, Oyarzabal was promoted to the rank of Ambassador Extraordinary and Plenipotentiary upon confirmation by the National Senate.

After serving as the Legal Adviser to Argentina's Foreign Ministry, in 2019, he was appointed as Ambassador to the Netherlands by Decree No. 793/2019, issued by then-President Mauricio Macri. He assumed his duties during the administration of President Alberto Fernández, and continued to serve during the administration of Javier Milei.

Oyarzabal also served as the Permanent Representative to the Organization for the Prohibition of Chemical Weapons (OPCW) and represented Argentina before the International Court of Justice, the Permanent Court of Arbitration, the International Criminal Court, the Hague Conference on Private International Law, and the Common Fund for Commodities. He was Chairman of the Governing Council of the Common Fund for Commodities from 2020 to 2022.

In 2025, he was re-appointed Legal Adviser to the Foreign Ministry.

Oyarzabal has represented the Argentine Republic before the International Court of Justice on two occasions. He served as legal counsel in the Uruguay River pulp mill dispute between Argentina and Uruguay and as an agent in the 2019 Advisory Opinion on the Legal Consequences of the 1965 Separation of the Chagos Archipelago from Mauritius.

In 2011, Oyarzabal served as a legal advisor in the first Advisory Opinion issued by the Seabed Disputes Chamber of the International Tribunal for the Law of the Sea. The opinion addressed the responsibilities and obligations of States sponsoring persons and entities engaging in activities in the Area.

Since 2017, Oyarzabal has served as an arbitrator and conciliator appointed under Annexes V and VII of the United Nations Convention on the Law of the Sea. He also served as an arbitrator and conciliator for the International Center for Settlement of Investment Disputes (2016–2022) and as a member of the Permanent Court of Arbitration (2019–2022).

Additionally, Oyarzabal has served as a member of the Legal and Technical Commission of the International Seabed Authority (2012–2013), the International Humanitarian Fact Finding Commission established by the 1949 Geneva Conventions (2017–2021), and the Committee for the Selection of the Prosecutor of the International Criminal Court (2019–2020).

== Academic career ==
Oyarzabal has taught international law at the University of La Plata and the University of Buenos Aires, among others. In 2020, he taught a course at The Hague Academy of International Law titled "The Influence of Public International Law on Private International Law in History and Theory and in the Formation and Application of Law". He has been invited by the academy's Curatorium to deliver the general course in 2029.

He is the author of four books and more than 50 contributions to collective works and academic articles published in legal journals such as International and Comparative Law Quarterly, European Journal of International Law, Rivista di diritto internazionale, Rabels Zeitschrift für ausländisches und internationales Privatrecht, Uniform Law Review, Revista Española de Derecho Internacional, University of Miami Inter -American Law Review, Revista de Informação Legislativa, as well as in publications like the Encyclopedia of Private International Law and the Argentine Yearbook of International Law.

=== Principal Publications ===
- El contrato de seguro multinacional, Ábaco, Buenos Aires, 1998.
- La nacionalidad argentina, La Ley, Buenos Aires, 2003.
- Derecho procesal transnacional, Ábaco, Buenos Aires, 2012.
- The Influence of Public International Law upon Private International Law in History and Theory and in the Formation and Application of the Law, Recueil des cours de l’Académie de droit international de La Haye, Vol. 428 (pp. 129–525), 2023.
- Derecho internacional privado para diplomáticos, APSEN/CARI, Buenos Aires, 2024.
