= Yuri Barseghov =

Russian lawyer (1925–2008)

Yuri Georgievich Barsegov (Armenian: Յուրի Գեորգիի Բարսեղով; Russian: Юрий Георгиевич Барсегов, March 7, 1925 in Tiflis – August 6, 2008 in Moscow) was an international law expert, J.D., professor, member of the United Nations' International Law Commission, the special assistant of the UN Deputy Secretary-General at the UN Secretariat (since 1971), director of the Armenian Institute of International Law and Political Science and a Foreign Member of the Armenian Academy of Sciences.

His most famous work was a three-volume collection of documents titled "The Armenian Genocide: Turkish responsibility and obligations of the international community. Documents and Comments" was published in 2005. This year he also published the first volume of his collected papers on Nagorno-Karabakh. He was an author of over 300 articles on international relations and law published in Russia, France, Germany, Norway, Sweden, Japan, Finland, Armenia and United States.

Barseghov was also a member of the Maritime Law Association and the International Law Association of Russia.
