= Guy Ladreit de Lacharrière =

French diplomat and Judge on the International Court of Justice

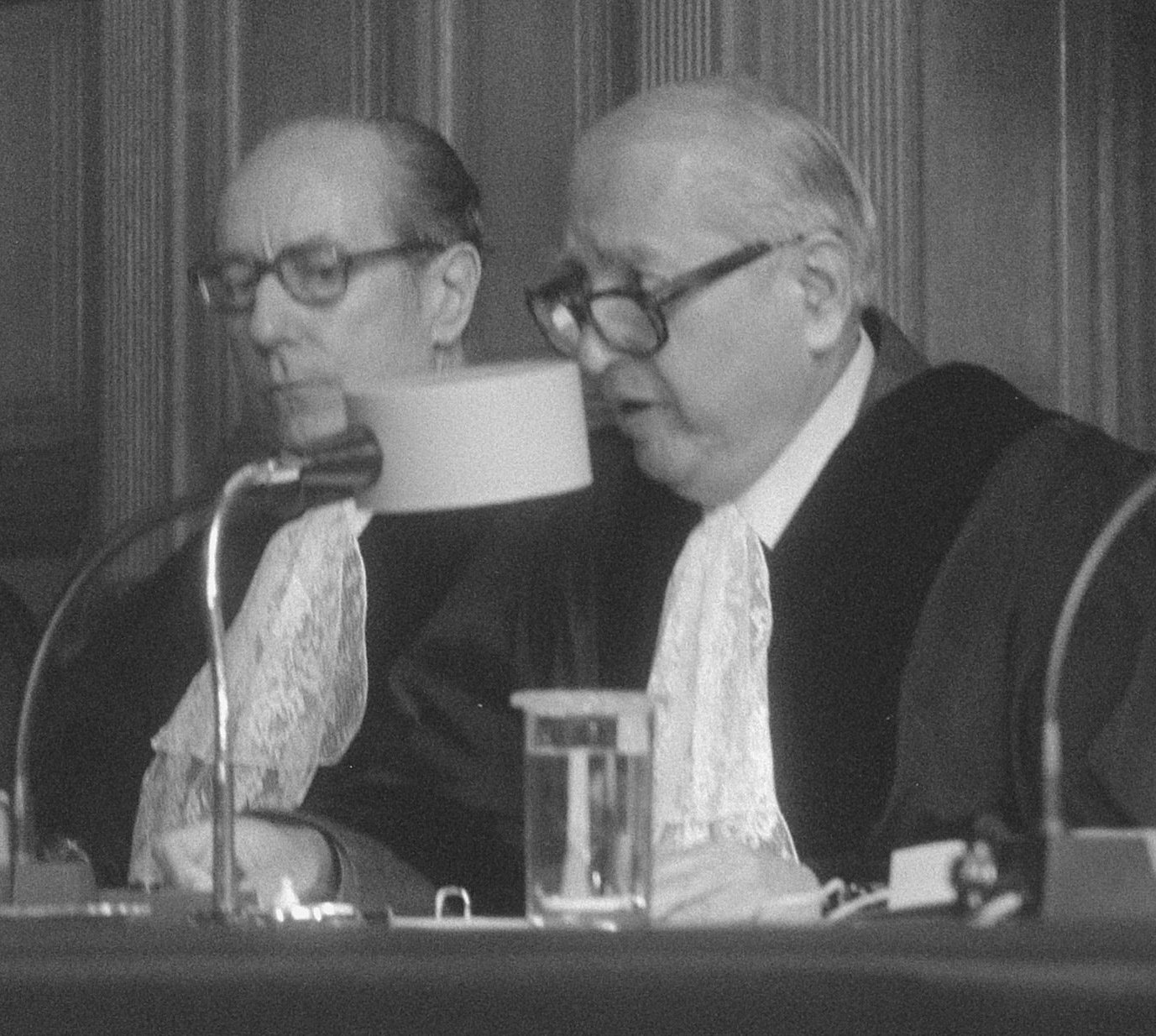
- Guy de Lacharrière and Nagendra Singh in 1986

Vice-president of the International Court of Justice
- In office 1985–1987
- Preceded by: José Sette Câmara Filho
- Succeeded by: Kéba Mbaye

Judge of the International Court of Justice
- In office 1982–1987
- Preceded by: André Gros
- Succeeded by: Gilbert Guillaume

Personal details
- Born: January 27, 1919 Marseille, France
- Died: 10 March 1987 (aged 68) Paris, France
- Education: Institut national des langues et civilisations orientales, École libre des sciences politiques, Paris Institute of Comparative Law
- Occupation: diplomat, jurist

Guy Ladreit de Lacharrière (27 January 1919 – 10 March 1987) was a French diplomat and jurist.

== Early life and education ==
Guy Ladreit de Lacharrière was born in a French noble family (fr), the son of Pierre Ladreit de Lacharrière and Juliette Papadacci-Stephanopoli.

He held a bachelor's degree in literature. He graduated from the Institut national des langues et civilisations orientales with a degree in Russian. He also studied at the École libre des sciences politiques, in the diplomatic section, between 1937 and 1939. Finally, he studied at the Paris Institute of Comparative Law. He held a doctorate in law.

== Career ==
In 1946, Guy de Lacharrière ranked first in the Ministry of Foreign Affairs competitive examination. That same year, he became an attaché at the French embassy in Russia, a position he held until 1948.

He subsequently returned to the Quai d’Orsay, where he held various internal positions. There, he served successively as head of the Office of International Organizations and secretary-general of the French delegation to UNESCO from 1948 to 1952, deputy head of the Economic Cooperation Division from 1952 to 1957, director of United Nations Affairs from 1964 to 1969, and director of Legal Affairs from 1969 to 1979. From 1952 to 1957, he served as deputy director of UNESCO’s Department of Social Sciences.

From 1979 to 1982, he served as a special advisor to the Council of State to participate in the Third United Nations Conference on the Law of the Sea.

He taught at the Paris Institute of Political Studies in the 1960s and 1970s, where he taught a course on international organizations and the USSR.

As a judge on the International Court of Justice, he served as vice president of that institution from 1985 until his death.

== Selected publications ==
- L’idée fédérale en Russie de Riourik à Staline, Paris, Pedone, 1945, 196 p. (doctoral thesis)
- Commerce extérieur et sous-développement, coll. Pragma, Paris, PUF, 1964, 279 p.
- La nouvelle division internationale du travail, Paris/Genève, Droz, 1969, 350 p.
- La stratégie commerciale du développement, Paris, PUF, 1973, 238 p.
- La politique juridique extérieure, coll. Enjeux internationaux, Paris, IFRI/Économica, 1983, 236 p.
- « L’influence de l’inégalité de développement des États sur le droit international », RCADI, 1973-II, vol. 139, pp. 227-268
- « Aspect du relativisime du droit international », in Realism in Law Making. Essays on International Law in Honour of Willem Riphagen, The Hague, Martinus Nijhoff Publishers, 1986, pp. 89-100
- « Les organisations internationales et la promotion des relations économiques internationales », in R.-J. Dupuy (dir.), Manuel sur le droit des organisations internationales, Dordrecht, Martinus Nijhoff Publishers, 1988, pp. 470-485

== See also ==
- Biography of de Lacharrière on the website of the French Society for International Law
- Press release of the ICJ on the death of de Lacharrière archived
