= Dudley Seers =

British economist

Dudley Seers CMG
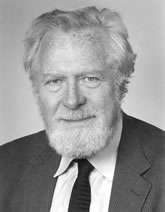
- Portrait photo of Dudley Seers
- Born: Dudley Seers; 11 April 1920; England
- Died: 21 June 1983 (aged 63); Washington D.C., U.S.A.
- Occupation: Economist
- Spouse: Patricia Seers
- Children: Four children: Pauline, Phillip, Adina & Susan
- Parents: George C Seers (father); Mabel Seers (Hallett) (mother)
- Military career
- Allegiance: New Zealand
- Branch: Royal New Zealand Navy
- Rank: Sub Lieutenant
- Units: HMS Cook, HMS King Alfred

Dudley Seers CMG (1920–1983) was a British/New Zealand economist who specialized in development economics. He was born a single child of Mabel (Hallett) Seers and George C Seers. George C Seers took the family across the world including New Zealand where George C Seers was the managing director of General Motors New Zealand working with (the Honourable) R Semple, the then Minister of Transport and Minister of Public Works. From his time in New Zealand, he entered military service with the New Zealand Royal Navy during WWII. After he taught at Oxford and then worked for various UN institutions. He was the director of the Institute of Development Studies at the University of Sussex from 1967 till 1972.

== WW2 Military Service ==
During WWII he served in the Royal New Zealand Navy, reaching the rank of Sub Lieutenant. One of the many WWII missions he was involved with was Operation Starkey. He served on HMS Cook and at HMS King Alfred. He was discharged from the Navy with full honours after receiving an injury to his left hand. He became a New Zealand citizen from serving in the Royal New Zealand Navy.

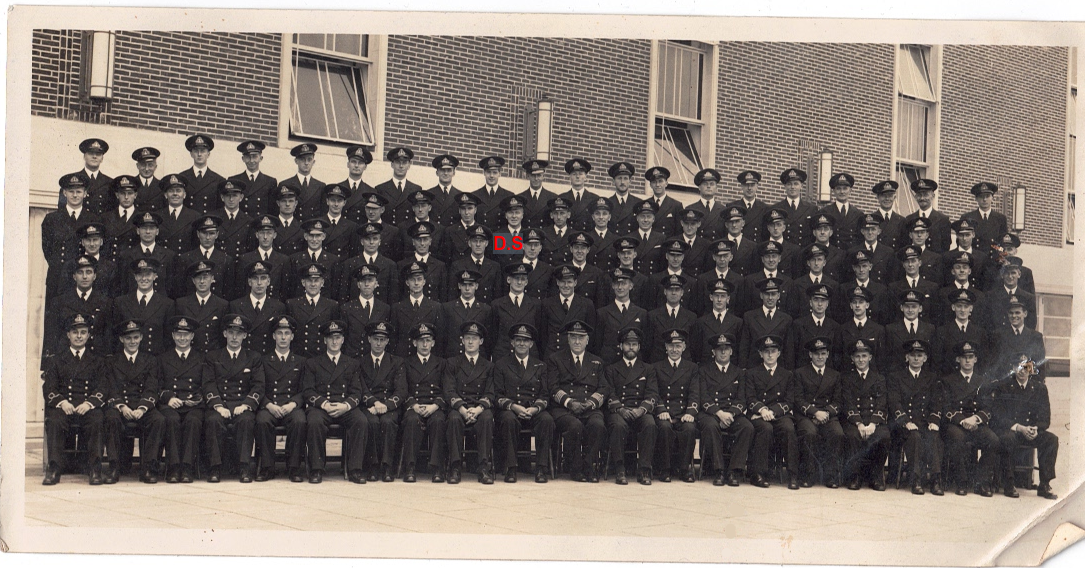

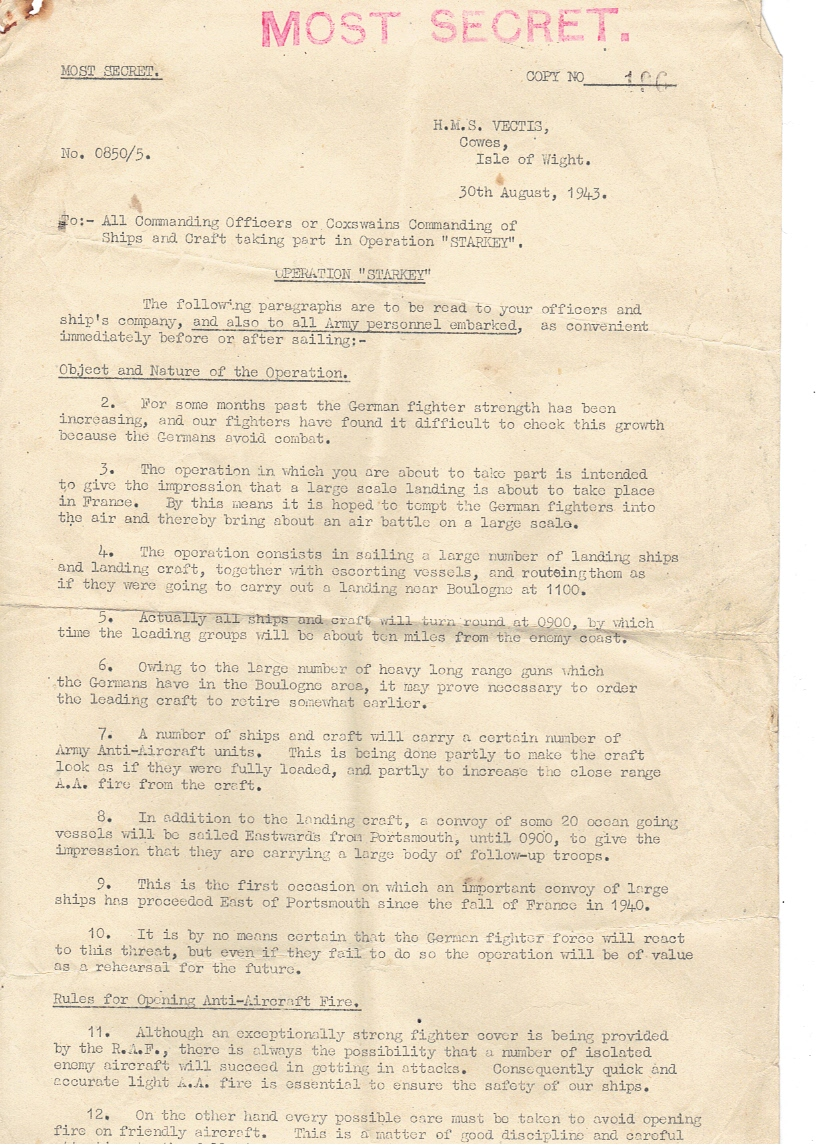

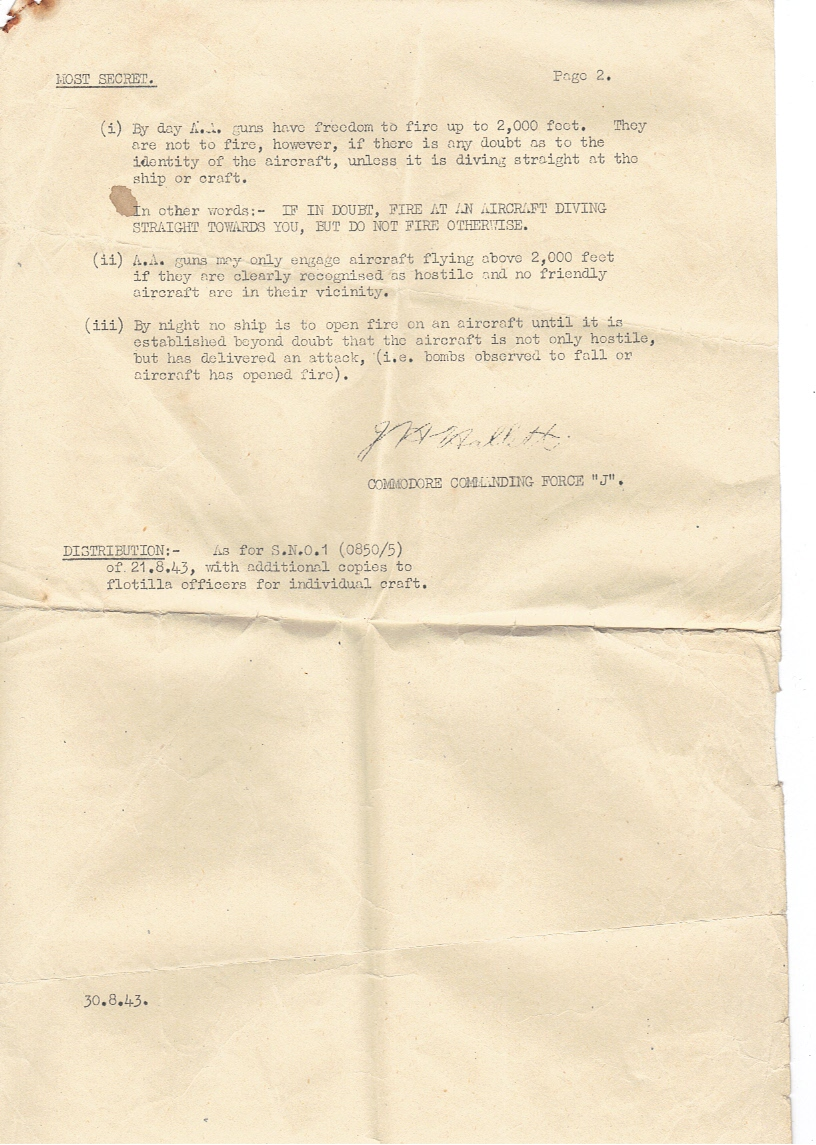

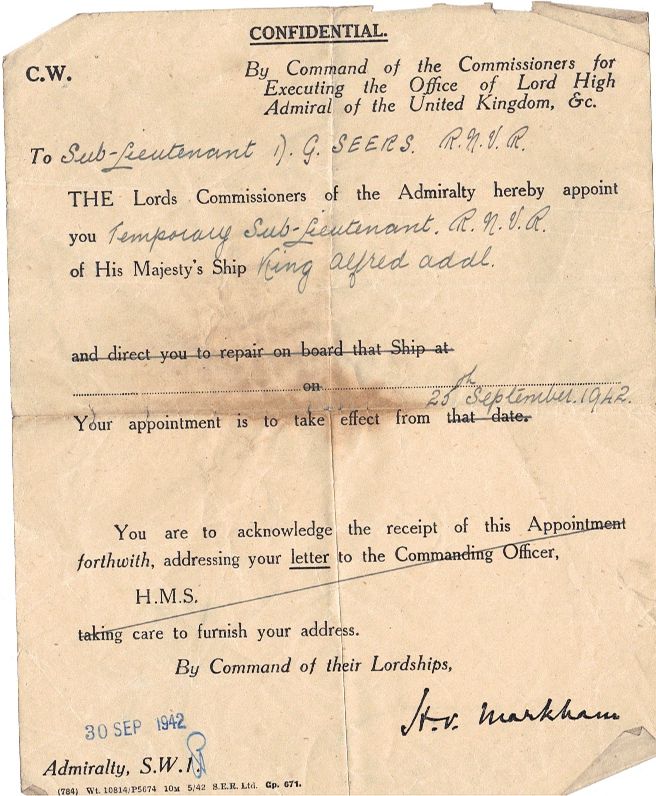

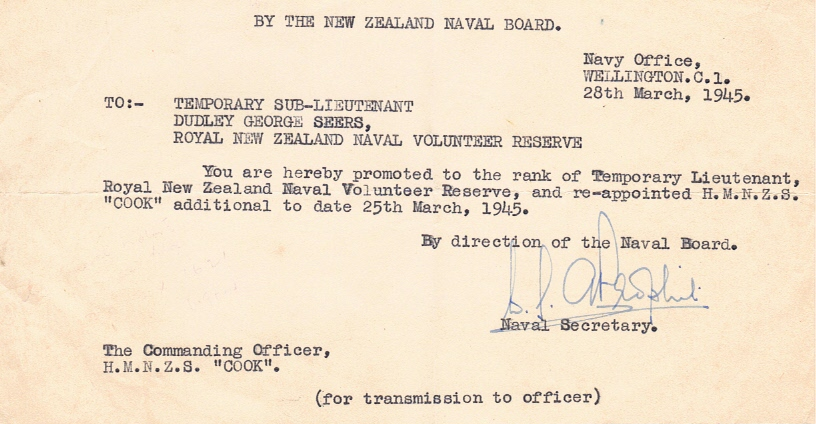

.

== Views on Development ==
Dudley Seers is famous for replacing the "growth fetishism" of the early postwar period with a greater concern for social development. He stressed the relativistic nature of judgements about development and questioned the value of the neoclassical approach to economics.

Writing on the Criteria for Development Nixon Reports, Seers argues that "Surely the values we need are staring us in the face, as soon as we ask ourselves: what are the necessary conditions for a universally accepted aim, the realization of the potential of human personality?"(Seers in Baster). Assuming that the aim and yardstick of development is implied by this, Seers goes on to identify a number of objectives for development for developing countries:

1. That family incomes should be adequate to provide a subsistence package of food, shelter, clothing, and footwear.
2. That jobs should be available to all family heads, not only because this will ensure that distribution of income will generally achieve subsistence consumption levels, but also because a job is something without which personality cannot develop.
3. That access to education should be increased and literacy ratios raised.
4. That the populace should be given an opportunity to participate in government.
5. That national independence should be achieved in the sense that the views of other governments do not largely predetermine one's own government's decisions. (Nixon in Colman and Nixon Economics of Change in Less Developed Countries)

There is explicitly in Seers a sequential aspect to this. As progress is made towards the economic goals, 'undernourishment, unemployment and inequality dwindle'..... 'educational and political aims become increasingly important objectives of development'.

== Selected works ==
- (1966) Twenty Leading Questions on the Teaching of Economics in The Teaching of Development Economics
- (1967) The Limitations of the Special Case, in Martin and Knapp, Teaching of Development Economics
- (1969) The Meaning of Development. International Development Review 11(4):3-4.
- (1970) New Approaches Suggested by the Colombia Employment Program, International Labour Review
- (1971) Development in a Divided World
- (1972) What are We Trying to Measure? Journal of Development Economics
- (1974) Redistribution with Growth (with Hollis Chenery)
- (1977) The New Meaning of Development, International Development Review
- (1977) Statistical needs for Development
- (1979) The Birth, Life and Death of Development Economics, Development and Change
- (1979) The Meaning of Development, with a Postscript. In Seers, Nafziger, Cruise O'Brien, & Bernstein
- (1979) with E. Wayne Nafziger, Donal Cruise O'Brien, & Henry Bernstein, Development Theory: Four Critical Studies. Ed. by David Lehmann. London:Frank Cass
- (1981) ed. Dependency Theory: A Critical Reassessment. London: Frances Pinter (Publishers) Ltd.
- (1981) 'Alternative Scenarios for Developing Countries: The Fundamental Issues'. In Bickley, Verner C. and Philip, Puthenparampil John (Editors). Cultural Relations in the Global Community: Problems and Prospects. New Delhi. Abhinav Publications.
- (1983) The Political Economy of Nationalism. New York: Oxford University Press.
- Also Editor of several key journals, including Oxford Economic Papers, The Economic Journal, Journal of Development Studies and IDS Bulletin.

Dudley was married to Patrica Seers with which they had three daughters, Pauline, Andina, Susan and a son, Phillip. These in turn created 9 grandchildren.

He was appointed CMG in the 1975 Birthday Honours.
