= Georges Scelle =

Georges Scelle (19 March 1878 Avranches (Manche) – 8 January 1961) was an international jurist and member of the United Nations International Law Commission.

Scelle attended the law faculty and the École Libre des Sciences Politiques in Paris, where he was awarded a prize for his thesis, "La traite négrière aux Indes de Castille", written under the supervision of Antoine Pillet.

Scelle was professor at the law faculty of Dijon for 20 years (Public International Law and Industrial Relations Law). From 1929 to 1933, he was a professor at the Geneva Graduate Institute of International Studies. He published the first volume of the Précis de droit des gens shortly before joining the University of Paris (1933) where he taught Public International Law until his retirement in 1948. He exerted a considerable influence on the generation which dominated both French public service and academic law circles from the 1930s until today. Influential academics or diplomats such as Georges Berlia, Lazare Kopelmanas, Guy de Lacharrière, Georges Burdeau, Charles Rousseau and René-Jean Dupuy had Georges Scelle as teacher.

== Other positions ==
- Technical adviser to the French delegation at the 5th session of the Assembly of the League of Nations in 1924
- French Delegate at the last session of that Assembly of the League of Nations in 1946.
- Member of the Commission of Enquiry on International Labour Conventions (From 1922 to 1958)
- Member and vice-president of the Administrative Tribunal of the International Labour Organization.
- Member associé of the Institut de Droit International from 1929.
- Member of the Permanent Court of Arbitration from 1950
- Counsel for France and Peru before the International Court of Justice in the Admission (1948) and Asylum (Colombia v. Peru - 1950) cases.
- Member of the International Law Commission from its inception (elected on 3 November 1948).
- The first "Secrétaire de la présidence" and then Secretary General of The Hague Academy of International Law (1935 to 1958)

== Legal philosophy ==
Scelle supported the codification of the laws of war in an international convention. In this regard, he believed that even UN forces "did not stand above all law", and was in favor of subjecting them as well to the provisions of the Geneva convention.

== Bibliography ==
- Koskenniemi, Martti (2004). The Gentle Civilizer of Nations. Cambridge: Cambridge University Press.
- Thierry, Hubert (1990). The European Tradition in International Law: Georges Scelle. European Journal of International Law (1990).
