= Kimmo Kiljunen =

Finnish author and politician

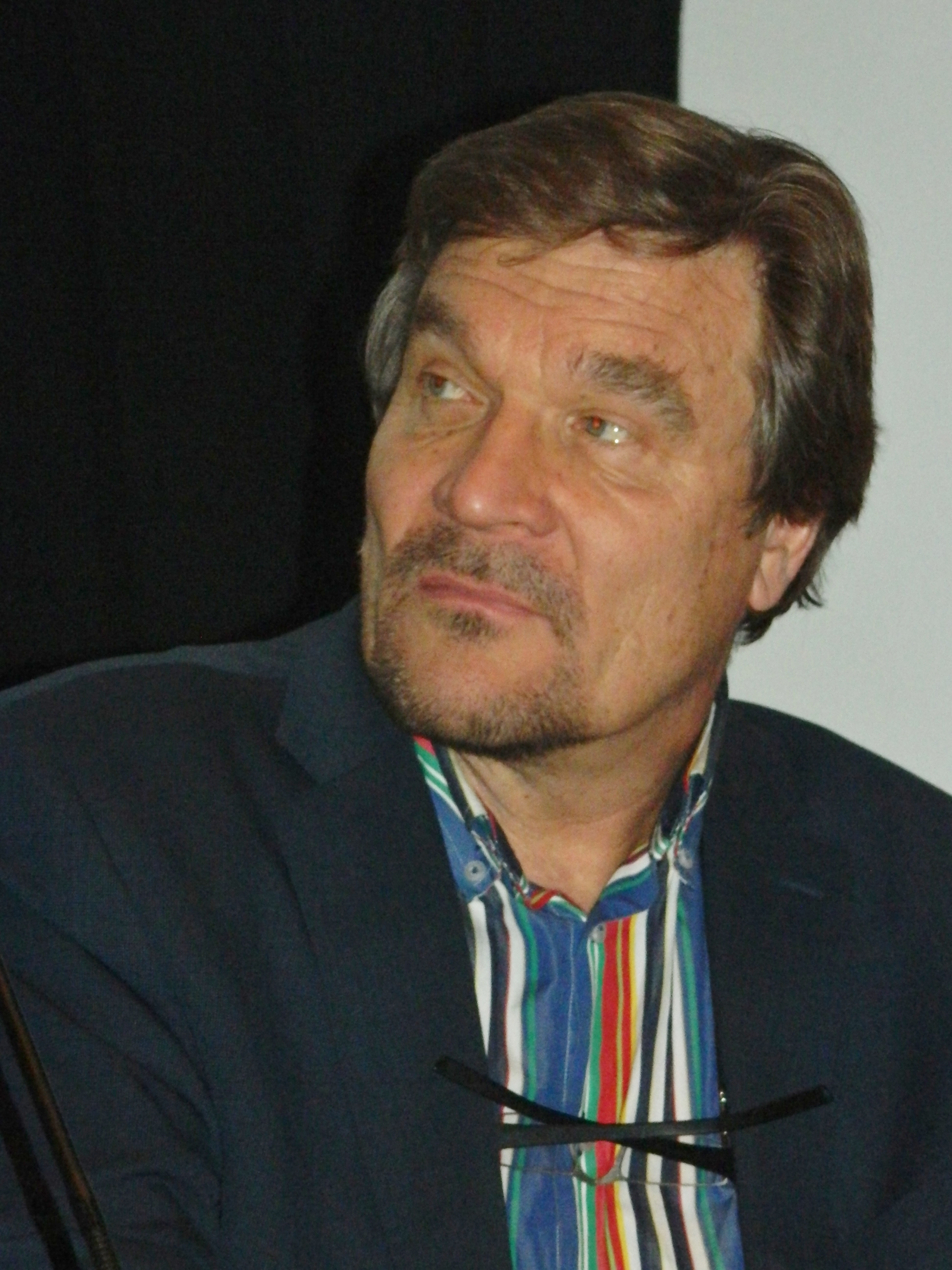
Kimmo Kiljunen in 2015

Kimmo Kiljunen (born 13 June 1951) is a Finnish author and politician of the Social Democratic Party. He served in the Finnish parliament from 1995 to 2011. He was a member of the Parliament's Grand Committee and chairperson of the Foreign Affairs Committee until his resignation in 2024. He also served as the chairman of the Vantaa city council.

== Education and early career ==
Kiljunen was born in Ruokolahti. He obtained a PhD from the University of Sussex.

Early in his career, Kiljunen published books on Finnish politics, international relations and development. He focused on European integration and bringing a parliamentary dimension to the work of intergovernmental organizations. He also worked for the United Nations Development Programme in New York City and UNICEF in Nairobi.

== Political career ==
Kiljunen was a member of the European Convention that drafted a constitution for the EU. He lost in the 2009 elections of the European Parliament.

Kiljunen was a member and vice-chair of the Organization for Security and Co-operation in Europe Parliamentary Assembly and led election observation missions in Eastern Europe and Central Asia. In 2010, he was in charge of the Independent International Commission of Inquiry into the Events in southern Kyrgyzstan, established after the President of the Kyrgyz Republic Roza Otunbayeva asked him, as Special Representative for Central Asia of the OSCE Parliamentary Assembly, to coordinate the process to establish it.

After broad consultation the terms of reference were established and endorsed. The KIC was mandated to investigate the facts and circumstances relevant to incidents that took place in southern Kyrgyzstan in June 2010, qualify the violations and crimes under international law, determine responsibilities and make recommendations, particularly on accountability measures, so as to ensure the non-repetition of the violations and to contribute toward peace, stability and reconciliation. After publication of the report's findings, the Kyrgyz parliament announced Kiljunen as persona non grata.

In addition to his role in parliament, Kiljunen has been chairing the Finnish delegation to the Parliamentary Assembly of the Council of Europe since 2019. As member of the Socialists, Democrats and Greens Group, he serves on the Committee on Political Affairs and Democracy; the Committee on the Honouring of Obligations and Commitments by Member States of the Council of Europe (Monitoring Committee); the Sub-Committee on External Relations; and the Sub-Committee on Conflicts between Council of Europe Member States. In the latter capacity, he is the Assembly's rapporteur on Armenia and Belarus. Kiljunen is a member of the AWEPA Governing Council.

In November 2024, while serving as a chairperson of the Foreign Affairs Committee, a video emerged showing Kiljunen speaking to members of Alexander Union (Aleksanterinliitto) association inside the Finnish Parliament House. In the video, Kiljunen says that the closure of the Finnish eastern border, which was implemented after Russia allowed a surge of illegal migrants to cross the border, is a violation of human rights, and the border should be reopened to passenger traffic. He also called the legislation restricting real estate transactions by Russians racist, and stated that the Finnish tabloid media coverage of Russia is a form of heavy hybrid influence. The comments were seen as being in stark contradiction with Finland's official foreign and security policy, and Kiljunen resigned as a chairperson of the Foreign Affairs Committee following the controversy.

== Personal life ==
Kiljunen married ambassador Marja-Liisa Kiljunen in 1972. They filed for divorce on 21 October 2008. They raised two daughters, Rauha and Riikka and two sons, Veikko and Jaakko. In 2017, Kiljunen married Russian-born Svetlana Kiljunen (née Poroeva).
