= De Rosnay =

de Rosnay is a French surname and may refer to:

- Gaëtan de Rosnay (1912–1992), French painter
- Joël de Rosnay (born 1937), Mauritian-born French science writer, and molecular biologist
- Jenna de Rosnay (born 1963), American windsurfer, fashion designer, and model
- Tatiana de Rosnay (born 1961), Franco-British writer
- Xavier de Rosnay (born 1982), member of the French electronic-house duo Justice

== See also ==
- Drosnay, a commune in Marne, France
