= Joseph Avenol =

French diplomat (1879–1952)

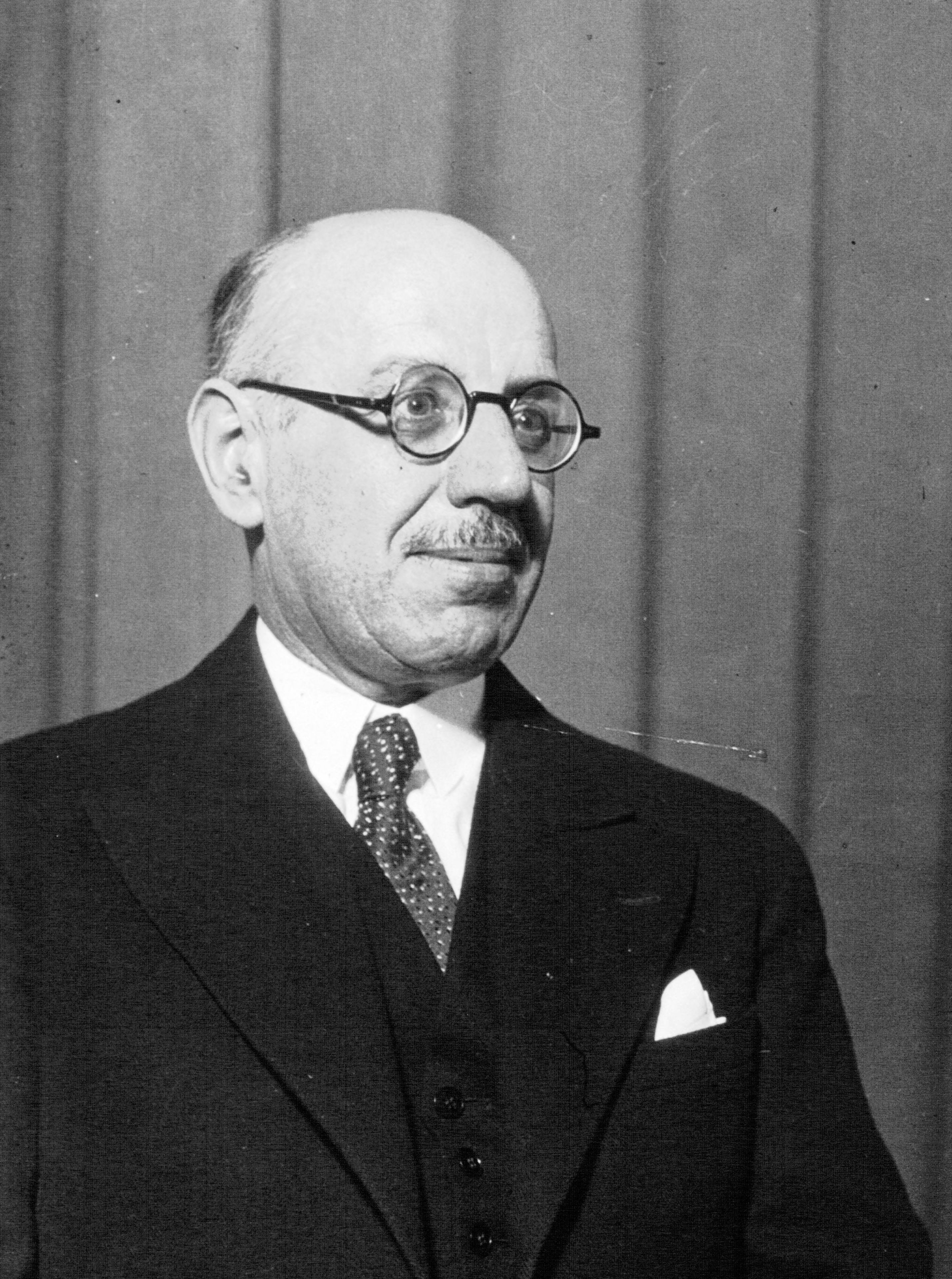
- Avenol in 1932

Secretary-General of the League of Nations
- In office 3 July 1933 – 31 August 1940
- Deputy: Frank Walters
- Preceded by: Eric Drummond
- Succeeded by: Seán Lester

Deputy Secretary-General of the League of Nations
- In office 1 February 1923 – 1 July 1933
- Secretary-General: Eric Drummond
- Preceded by: Jean Monnet
- Succeeded by: Pablo de Azcárate

Personal details
- Born: Joseph Louis Anne Marie Charles Avenol; 9 June 1879 Melle, Deux-Sèvres, French Third Republic
- Died: 2 September 1952 (aged 73) Duillier, Switzerland
- Education: Université de Poitiers; Sciences Po
- Profession: Banker

Joseph Louis Anne Marie Charles Avenol (French: [ʒozɛf lwi an maʁi ʃaʁl avnɔl]; 9 June 1879 – 2 September 1952) was a French diplomat. He served as the second Secretary General of the League of Nations from 3 July 1933 to 31 August 1940. He was preceded by Sir Eric Drummond of the United Kingdom, who was general secretary between 1920 and 1933. He was succeeded by the Irish diplomat Seán Lester, who was general secretary between 1940 and 1946, when the League dissolved.

== League of Nations ==
Avenol was sent to the League of Nations from the French Treasury Department in 1922 to handle the League's finances. He was under secretary-general in 1933, when Eric Drummond resigned. He became secretary-general because the first secretary-general had been British and there had been a private agreement at Versailles that the next would be French. Avenol was accused of using the League as an extension of the French Foreign Office in its policy of appeasement of Germany and Italy.

Avenol took office shortly after Japan had left the League. Shortly thereafter Germany also left, and Argentina resumed full membership. He worked to prevent action or criticism of those countries in an effort to lure them back to the League. When Italy invaded Ethiopia in 1935, Avenol's main concern was to keep the Italians in the organization, not to protect Ethiopia. In 1939 he encouraged Finland to file a complaint so that the League could expel the Soviet Union.

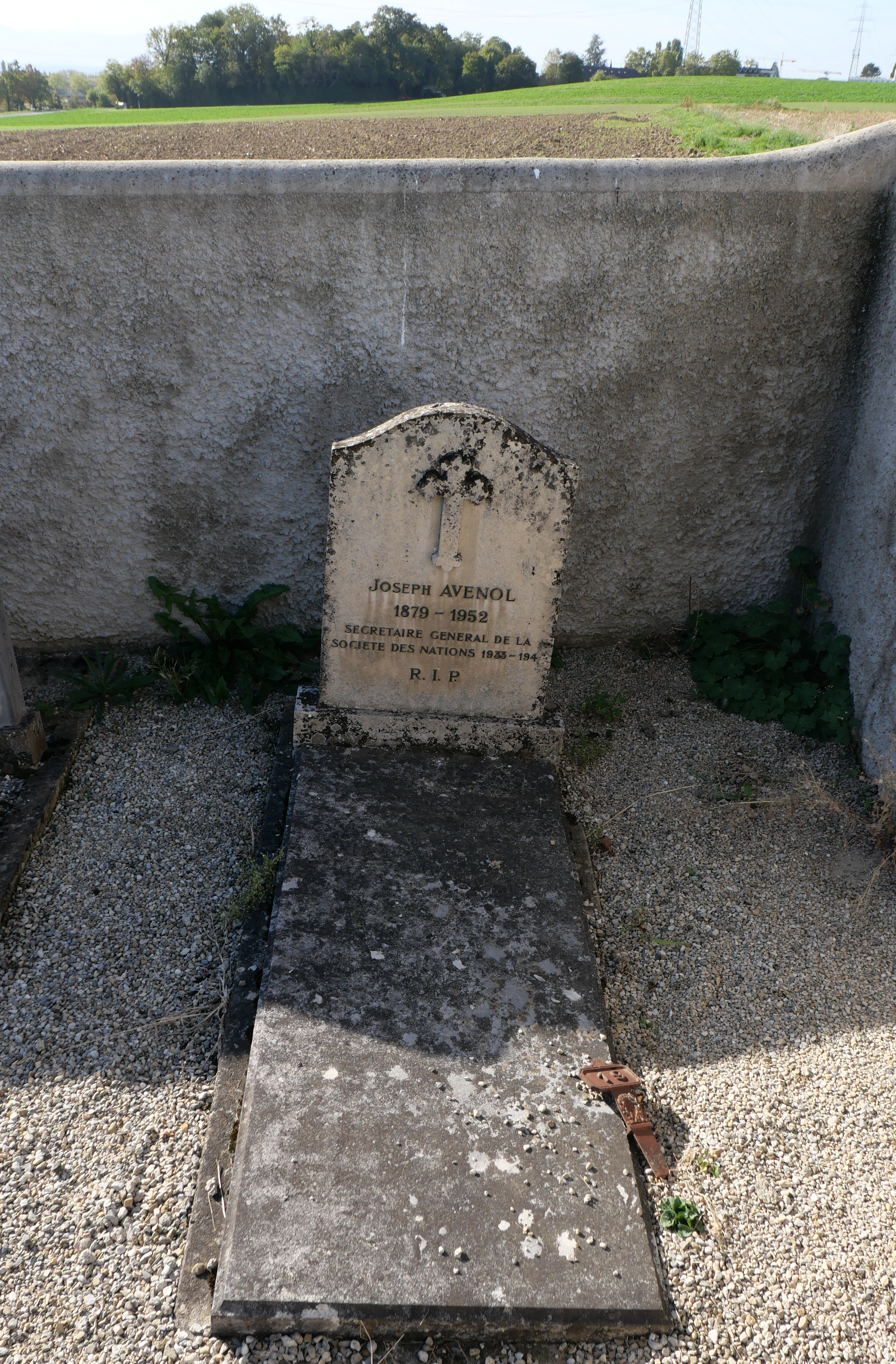
Avenol's grave in Duillier.

Later Avenol described "a new France, which was to be given a new soul to work in collaboration with Germany and Italy and keep the British out of Europe". He wrote to Marshal Philippe Pétain to affirm his loyalty to the Vichy government.

== Last years and death ==
In the meantime, he had fired most of the League's staff, including all of the British employees. When World War II started on 1 September 1939, Avenol had decided to leave Geneva and the League of Nations for good on 31 August 1940. His services were not accepted by the Vichy government, and he was forced to flee back into Switzerland on New Year's Eve 1943 to avoid getting arrested by the Germans. He died at his home in Duillier, Switzerland, in 1952, aged 73.

When Seán Lester replaced him as secretary-general, the League had only 100 employees, including guards and janitors, out of its original 700. Lester managed to keep the League's technical and humanitarian programs in limited operation for the duration of the war. In 1946 he turned over the League's assets and functions to the newly-established United Nations.

== Honours ==
In 1921, he was created an honorary Knight Commander of the Order of the British Empire.

== Notes ==
Positions in intergovernmental organisations
| Preceded by (United Kingdom) Sir Eric Drummond | Secretary-General of the League of Nations; 1933–1940 | Succeeded by (Republic of Ireland) Seán Lester |
