= Agnès Michaux =

French writer, translator and journalist

- Agnès Michaux at the 2010 Brive Book Fair, held in Brive-la-Gaillarde.
- Born: 1968 (age 57–58); Tours, Indre-et-Loire, France
- Known for: Translator, novelist, journalist, writer
- Awards: 2025 Prix Sade (Huysmans vivant) 2026 Prix Goncourt de la biographie (Huysmans vivant)

Agnès Michaux is a French writer, translator and journalist born in Tours, in 1968.

== Biography ==
=== Education ===
Agnès Michaux studied at the École normale supérieure and devoted her postgraduate thesis to English speaking writers in nineteenth century Venice ("écrivains anglo-saxons dans la Venise du XIXe siècle").

=== Career ===
Between 1993 and 2002, Agnès Michaux was a journalist and host on the Canal+ channel, collaborating on the programs "Nulle part ailleurs" and "La Grande Famille" and hosting a weekly program on cinema, "Bande(s) à part".

She worked for France Inter for a while, alongside Stéphane Bern on the radio show Le Fou du roi.

She is the author of numerous novels, including Je les chasserai jusqu'au bout du monde jusqu'à ce qu'ils en crèvent, set in Berlin at the time of the last days of Fritz Lang's life; Le Témoin - a Bolshevik guard is a witness to the end of the Romanovs - received the prix Lauriers verts de la Forêt des Livres. Les Sentiments explored the relationship between Marilyn Monroe and Yves Montand on the set of Let's Make Love in 1960.

In 2008, she translated Tatiana de Rosnay's English manuscript about an American journalist investigating the Vel' d'Hiv roundup, Sarah’s Key, into French, in which it was first published as Elle s'appelait Sarah, becoming a best seller.

She has co-directed two biographical documentaries - on Stanley Kubrick in 1999, and Terrence Malick in 2000.

In 2026, she was the winner of the Goncourt Prize for biography for her book Huysmans vivant, dedicated to Joris-Karl Huysmans.

== Publications ==
=== Books ===
- 1998 Sissi, une vie retrouvée, éditions No. 1 ISBN 978-2-86391-888-3 - Rééd. J'ai lu
- 1999 Je les chasserai jusqu'au bout du monde jusqu'à ce qu'ils en crèvent, No. 1 ISBN 9782863919330
- 2002 Le Suaire, Calmann-Lévy ISBN 9782702133361
- 2005 Stayin' alive, éditions du Rocher ISBN 9782268052915
- 2006 Zelda, Flammarion, ISBN 9782080687777
- 2009 Le Témoin, J'ai lu-Flammarion ISBN 978-2-08-120194-1
- 2010 Les Sentiments, J'ai lu-Flammarion ISBN 9782081243491
- 2015 Codex Botticelli, Éditions Belfond ISBN 9782714460271
- 2016 Journée exceptionnelle du déclin de Samuel Cramer, Éditions Belfond ISBN 978-2-7144-7126-0
- 2017 Système, Éditions Belfond ISBN 978-2-7144-7810-8
- 2018 Roman noir, Éditions Joëlle Losfeld ISBN 978-2-0727-4830-1
- 2020 La Fabrication des chiens - Volume 1 : 1889, Éditions Belfond ISBN 978-2-7144-7961-7
- 2021 La Fabrication des chiens - Volume 2 : 1899, Éditions Belfond ISBN 978-2-7144-8233-4
- 2022 La Fabrication des chiens - Volume 3 : 1909, Éditions Belfond ISBN 978-2-7144-9553-2

=== Essays and documents ===
- 1993 Dictionnaire misogyne, Jean-Claude Lattès, ISBN 9782253137085. Paperback edition, Paris, Le Livre de poche.
- 1996 Le Roman de Venise, Albin Michel, ISBN 9782226085115.
- 2011 Kissing My Songs, texts and conversations with Nicola Sirkis, Flammarion, ISBN 9782081268142.
- 2012 Death Is a Star - La Mort : sa vie, son œuvre. Co-written with Anton Lenoir, Flammarion, ISBN 9782081286092.
- 2014 Miscellanées à l'usage des gens heureux (ou désirant le devenir), Autrement, ISBN 9782746735989.
- 2017 Le Dictionnaire de l'espionnage (du bureau des légendes), illustrated by Anton Lenoir, The Oligarchs Editions, ISBN 9782956067627.

=== Biography ===
- 2025 Huysmans vivant, Le Cherche Midi, ISBN 9782749181066 (Prix Goncourt de la biographie - 2026)

=== Translations ===
- 2005 Libba Bray, L’Œil du destin : Les Sorcières de Spence (A Great and Terrible Beauty), Éditions du Rocher ISBN 9782268054087
- 2007 Tatiana de Rosnay, Elle s'appelait Sarah (Sarah's Key), ed. Héloïse d'Ormesson ISBN 9782350870458
- 2008 Matthew Carr, La Mécanique infernale (The Infernal Machine), ed. Héloïse d'Ormesson ISBN 9782350870786
- 2009 Tatiana de Rosnay, Boomerang (A Secret Kept), ed. Héloïse d'Ormesson ISBN 9782350871066
- 2016 Saïdeh Pakravan, La Trêve, Éditions Belfond ISBN 9782714474285
- 2024 Pete Doherty, Un garçon charmant, Le Cherche-Midi ISBN 9782749176536
