= Seán Lester =

Irish diplomat (1888–1959)

Secretary-General of the League of Nations
- In office 31 August 1940 – 18 April 1946
- Preceded by: Joseph Avenol
- Succeeded by: Trygve Lie (as Secretary-General of the United Nations)

Deputy Secretary-General of the League of Nations
- In office 18 February 1937 – 26 July 1940 Serving with Francis Paul Walters
- Secretary-General: Joseph Avenol
- Preceded by: Pablo de Azcárate
- Succeeded by: Francis Paul Walters

Personal details
- Born: John Ernest Lester; 28 September 1888 Carrickfergus, Ireland
- Died: 13 June 1959 (aged 70) Galway, Ireland
- Spouse: Elizabeth Tyrrell (m. 1920)
- Children: 3
- Education: Methodist College Belfast
- Profession: Journalist

Seán Lester (28 September 1888 – 13 June 1959) was an Irish diplomat who was the last secretary-general of the League of Nations from 31 August 1940 to 18 April 1946.

== Early life ==
John Ernest Lester was born in County Antrim in the east of Ulster, the son of a Protestant grocer, Robert Lester, and his wife, the former Henrietta Ritchie. Although the town of Carrickfergus, where he was born and raised, was strongly Unionist, he joined the Gaelic League as a youth and was won over to the cause of Irish nationalism.

The family moved to Belfast when he was young and he attended Methodist College Belfast in the city; after leaving school, he changed his name from John to the Irish ‘Seán’.

As a young man, he joined the Irish Republican Brotherhood (IRB). He worked as a journalist for the North Down Herald and a number of other northern papers before he moved to Dublin, where he found a job at the Freeman's Journal. By 1919, he had risen to become its news editor.

After the Irish War of Independence, a number of his friends joined the new government of the Irish Free State. Lester was offered and accepted the position as director of publicity.

He married Elizabeth Ruth Tyrrell in 1920, and they had three daughters.

== Diplomatic career ==
In 1923, he joined the Irish Free State's Department of External Affairs. He was sent to Geneva in 1929 to replace Michael MacWhite as the Irish Free State's Permanent Delegate to the League of Nations. In 1930, he succeeded in organising the Irish Free State's election to the Council (or executive body) of the League of Nations for a three year term. Lester often represented the Irish Free State at Council meetings and stood in for the Irish Minister for External Affairs. He became increasingly involved in the work of the League, particularly in its attempts to bring a resolution to two wars in South America. His work brought him to the attention of the League Secretariat and began his transformation from national to international civil servant.

When Peru and Colombia had a dispute over a town in the headwaters of the Amazon, Lester presided over the committee that found an equitable solution; he also presided over the less-successful committee when Bolivia and Paraguay went to war over the Gran Chaco.

In 1933, Lester was seconded to the League's Secretariat and sent to Danzig (now Gdańsk, Poland), as the League of Nations' High Commissioner from 1934 to 1937. The Free City of Danzig was the scene of an emerging international crisis between Nazi Germany and the international community over the issue of the Polish Corridor and the Free City's relationship with the Third Reich. High Commissioner Lester repeatedly protested to the German government over its persecution and discrimination of Jews and warned the League of the looming disaster for Europe. He was boycotted by the representatives of the German Reich and the representatives of the Nazi Party in Danzig.

In August 2010, a room in the Gdańsk City Hall, the building that had been Lester's headquarters during his stay, was renamed by Mayor Paweł Adamowicz as the Seán Lester Room.

=== League of Nations ===
Lester returned to Geneva in 1937 to become Deputy Secretary General of the League of Nations. In 1940, he became Secretary General of the body (he became the League's leader a year after the outbreak of the Second World War which showed that the League had failed in its primary purpose). The League had only 100 employees, including guards and cleaners, out of the original 700.

Secretary-General Lester remained in Geneva throughout the war and kept the League's technical and humanitarian programmes in limited operation for the duration of the war. In 1946, he oversaw the League's closure and turned over the League's assets and functions to the newly-established United Nations (UN).

== Later years ==
Lester was given the Woodrow Wilson Award in 1945, a doctorate from Trinity College, Dublin in 1947, and a doctorate of the National University of Ireland in 1948.

Despite rumours that he would be prepared to stand for election as President of Ireland, Lester sought no permanent office and retired to Recess, County Galway, in the west of Ireland, where he died in 1959.

== Legacy ==
In its obituary, The Times described Lester as an "international conciliator and courageous friend of refugees".

Lester’s diaries and other papers are held at the United Nations’ Archive.

His granddaughter Susan Denham was Chief Justice of Ireland for the Supreme Court of Ireland from 2011 to 2017.

In 2013, the Ulster History Circle secured a plaque for his childhood home in Belfast.

== Biographies ==
- Stephen Ashworth Barcroft: The international civil servant: the League of Nations career of Sean Lester, 1929–1947; Dublin 1973
- Douglas Gageby: The last secretary general: Sean Lester and the League of Nations; Dublin 1999; ISBN 1-86059-108-6
- Arthur W. Rovine: The first fifty years: the secretary-general in world politics 1920–1970; Leyden 1970; ISBN 90-218-9190-5
- Michael Kennedy: Ireland and the League of Nations 1919–1946: politics, diplomacy and international relations; Dublin 1996
- Paul McNamara: Sean Lester, Poland and the Nazi Takeover of Danzig; Irish Academic Press Ltd 2008; ISBN 0-7165-2969-6

Positions in intergovernmental organisations
Preceded by (France) Joseph Avenol	Secretary-General of the League of Nations; 1940–1946	Succeeded by (United Kingdom) Gladwyn Jebb as acting United Nations Secretary-General
