= List of Secretary-General of the United Nations memoirs =

The United Nations Secretary-General is the head of the Secretariat, one of the principal divisions of the United Nations. Many of the individuals who have served as the world body's top office have written memoirs, either before, during or after their terms of office (service).

#	Secretary-General	Dates in office	Memoirs Title
-	Sir Gladwyn Jebb (acting)	24 October 1945 – 2 February 1946	?
1	Trygve Halvdan Lie	2 February 1946 – November 1952	In the Cause of Peace (first and only publication, 1954)
2	Dag Hammarskjöld	10 April 1953 – 18 September 1961	Vägmärken (Markings); ISBN 0-394-43532-X
3	U Thant	3 November 1961 – 31 December 1971	View from the UN; ISBN 0-385-11541-5
4	Kurt Waldheim	1 January 1972 – 31 December 1981	In the Eye of the Storm; ISBN 0-297-78678-4
5	Javier Pérez de Cuéllar	1 January 1982 – 31 December 1991	Pilgrimage for Peace; ISBN 0-312-16486-6
6	Boutros Boutros-Ghali	1 January 1992 – 31 December 1996	Unvanquished: A U.S.–U.N. Saga; ISBN 0-8129-9204-0
7	Kofi Annan	1 January 1997 – 31 December 2006	Interventions: A Life in War in Peace; ISBN 978-159420420-3
8	Ban Ki-moon	1 January 2007 – 31 December 2016	?
9	António Guterres	1 January 2017 – Incumbent	?
