= Sarah's Key =

- Theatrical release poster
- Directed by: Gilles Paquet-Brenner
- Screenplay by: Serge Joncour; Gilles Paquet-Brenner
- Based on: Sarah's Key by Tatiana de Rosnay
- Produced by: Stéphane Marsil
- Starring: Kristin Scott Thomas
- Cinematography: Pascal Ridao
- Edited by: Hervé Schneid
- Music by: Max Richter
- Production companies: Hugo Productions; Studio 37; TF1 Droits Audiovisuels; France 2 Cinema
- Distributed by: UGC Distribution
- Release date: 16 September 2010 (TIFF)
- Running time: 111 minutes
- Country: France
- Languages: French; English
- Budget: $8.6 million
- Box office: $24.8 million

Sarah's Key (French: Elle s'appelait Sarah) is a 2010 French drama film directed and co-written by Gilles Paquet-Brenner. The film is an adaptation of the 2006 novel by Tatiana de Rosnay.

The film alternates between a young girl Sarah (Mélusine Mayance) in 1942 and journalist Julia (Kristin Scott Thomas) in 2009 who is researching Sarah's story. It tells the story of Sarah's experiences during and after the Vel' d'Hiv Roundup of Jews in German-occupied Paris in 1942 and the participation of bureaucracy in Vichy France and French citizens hiding and protecting Sarah from the French authorities.

== Plot ==
In 1942, 10-year-old Sarah Starzynski hides her younger brother from French police by locking him in a secret closet and telling him to stay there until she returns. She takes the key with her when she and her parents are transported to the Vélodrome d'Hiver, where they are held in inhuman conditions by the Paris Police and French Secret Service.

The deportees are transferred to the French-run Beaune-la-Rolande internment camp. The adults are deported to the Auschwitz concentration camp, leaving the children in the camp. When Sarah tries to escape with her friend Rachel, a sympathetic Paris police guard spots them. When Sarah begs him to let them go so she can save her brother, he hesitates then lifts the barbed wire to let them out.

Sarah and Rachel fall asleep in a dog house at a farm where they are discovered by the farmers, Jules and Genevieve Dufaure. Despite knowing what they are and the associated danger, the Dufaures decide to help the girls. Rachel is dying, and when they call attention to themselves by calling in a doctor, a skeptical German officer asks them if they know anything about a second Jewish child. The officer begins a search for the second child, only to be interrupted when the French physician carries out the dead body of Rachel. Days later, the Dufaures take Sarah back to her family's apartment building in Paris. Sarah runs up to her apartment, knocking on the door furiously. A boy, 12 years old, answers. She rushes into her old room and unlocks the cupboard. Horrified by what she finds, she starts screaming hysterically.

After the war, Sarah continues to live as a family member with the Dufaures and their two grandsons. When she turns 18, she moves to the United States, hoping to put everything that happened behind her. She stops corresponding with the Dufaures when she gets married and has a son, William. When her son is nine, Sarah – still despondent and blaming herself for her brother's death - drives her car into the path of an oncoming truck. It is explained to her son that her death was merely an accident.

In the present, the French husband of journalist Julia inherits the apartment of his grandparents (his elderly father was the boy who opened the door to Sarah in August 1942). Having previously done an article on the Vel' d'Hiv Roundup, Julia finds her interest piqued when she learns that the apartment came into her husband's family at about the time of the Roundup and she begins to investigate what happened 60 years earlier. Her father-in-law tells Julia what he knows so she will quit prying.

Julia begins an obsessive quest to find any trace of Sarah, eventually learning of her life in Brooklyn and finally locating William in Italy. She meets with him and asks him for information about his mother, but learns to her surprise that William does not know his mother's history or even that she was Jewish, believing only that she had been a French farm girl. Listening in amazement, William rejects the story and dismisses Julia. Later, everything is confirmed to William by his dying father, Richard, including Sarah's suicide. He gives William Sarah's journals and notes, telling him Sarah immediately had William baptized right after his birth, fearing that "being Jewish" was a threat to him and explaining that "...we're all a product of our history." The key to the cupboard is among the items handed to him by his father.

Julia, having given up hope of having another child after years of unsuccessful attempts to conceive, discovers she's pregnant. Her husband, though in the midst of an affair, selfishly leaves their life with their 12-year-old daughter, Zoe, as he does not want to have another child at this point in life. Julia ultimately decides against an abortion, has a baby girl, divorces her husband and eventually moves with her daughters to New York City.

Two years later, William, having contacted Julia, meets her for a late lunch in a restaurant favored by Sarah and gives her additional information about his mother that the Dufaures had. Julia is amazed and happy for him, and has brought her young daughter along to the meeting. William breaks into tears when Julia tells him her daughter's name is Sarah. Julia comforts him as they both look at little Sarah.

== Cast ==
- Kristin Scott Thomas as Julia Jarmond
- Mélusine Mayance as Sarah Starzynski
  - Charlotte Poutrel as adult Sarah Starzynski
- Natasha Mashkevich as Mrs. Starzynski
- Arben Bajraktaraj as Mr. Starzynski
- Niels Arestrup as Jules Dufaure
- Dominique Frot as Geneviève Dufaure
- Frédéric Pierrot as Bertrand Tezac
- Michel Duchaussoy as Édouard Tezac
- Gisèle Casadesus as Mamé Tezac
- Aidan Quinn as William Rainsferd
- George Birt as Richard Rainsferd
- Paige Jennifer Barr as Ornella Harris

== Release ==
The film had a preview at the Toronto International Film Festival on 16 September 2010, then it had a wide release in France on 13 October 2010 and in Italy on 13 January 2012.

== Reception ==
The film has been critically well received. On the review aggregator website Rotten Tomatoes, 73% of 117 critics' reviews are positive, with an average rating of 6.5/10. The website's consensus reads: "Sarah's Key is an absorbing, impeccably-acted Holocaust drama with minor plot issues." The film recorded 1,635,278 admissions in Europe.

Although British, Scott-Thomas delivers her English dialogue in an American accent, for most of the film she speaks fluent French as she has lived in France for many years. She has done many Anglo-French movies in French and received a César Award nomination for this performance. The Holocaust holds personal meaning for her because her in-laws were forced to flee their homes as children, and only avoided the concentration camps by hiding in the countryside.

For Libération, however, "the film is penalized by the heaviness of the effects, leading the viewer to the edge of a glycemic coma. As for the moral of the story, it is imbued with a clumsy psychoanalysis on the theme of the necessary revelation of the truth". Le Monde is also skeptical: "Isn't the challenge of a man of images to try to communicate the incommunicable via what his art is likely to suggest beyond images, in a vertiginous out - which he did not seize. This plot is laden with revealing symbols: the Jewish child in the closet, the apartment haunted by a ghost, the key to something unsaid belatedly revealed to the next generation."

The New York Times speaks of a nightmare, a tale, with French and German villains, a horror film, with "awkward exhibition scenes", unpleasant, sentimental, which use the horrors of the past to honor history, but instead trivializes it. For The Guardian, the problem is that in modern times, as we leave Brooklyn, Paris and Florence in the footsteps of Sarah, things look a bit like a TV movie.

== Home video ==
The film was released in the US on DVD and Blu-ray Disc on 22 November 2011.

== See also ==
- The Holocaust in France
