= Eric Drummond, 7th Earl of Perth =

British politician and diplomat (1876–1951)

The Right Honourable The Earl of Perth GCMG, CB, PC, DL
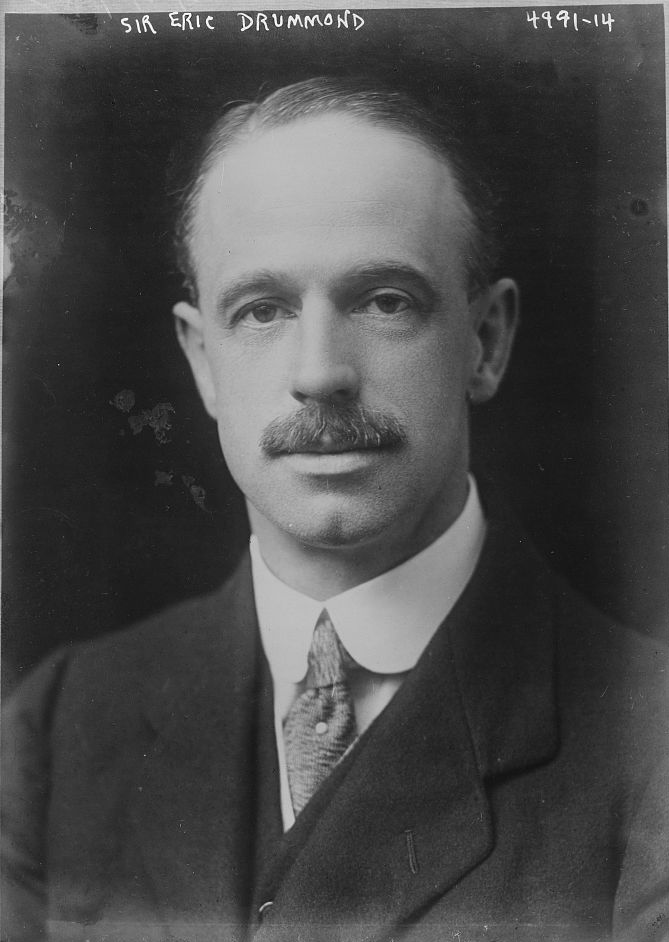
- Drummond, c. 1918

Secretary-General of the League of Nations
- In office 1 August 1920 – 2 July 1933
- Deputy: Jean Monnet; Joseph Avenol
- Preceded by: Position established
- Succeeded by: Joseph Avenol

Personal details
- Born: 17 August 1876 Fulford, England, United Kingdom of Great Britain and Ireland
- Died: 15 December 1951 (aged 75) Sussex, England, United Kingdom
- Spouse: Angela Mary Constable-Maxwell
- Education: Eton College

James Eric Drummond, 7th Earl of Perth, (Note: Eric Drummond was the 13th Duke of Perth in the Jacobite peerage and the 16th descendant of the lineage established by the creation of the Earldom of Perth in 1605. However, he was only the 7th Earl of Perth to hold a recognised peerage because of the forfeiture of the peerage from 1716 to 1853 by the attainder of the 4th Earl's heir.) GCMG, CB, PC, DL (17 August 1876 – 15 December 1951), was a British politician and diplomat who was the first Secretary-General of the League of Nations from 1920 to 1933.

He succeeded in building an effective international staff but failed to resolve major international disputes, because of pressure from Britain and France, the most powerful League members. He moved on to become British Ambassador to Italy (1933–1939) and then the chief adviser on foreign publicity in the Ministry of Information (1939–1940). In 1946, he became deputy leader of the Liberal Party in the House of Lords.

== Early life and career ==
=== Family ===
Drummond was born into the Scottish nobility, the Chiefs of Clan Drummond. His father was James David Drummond, 10th Viscount Strathallan (1839–1893), an army officer of Machany in Perthshire who had three children with his second wife, Margaret Smythe, the daughter of William Smythe of Methven Castle in Perthshire. James Eric Drummond was the eldest and the only son but Drummond had two half-sisters and one half-brother, William Huntley Drummond, from his father's first marriage to Ellen Thornhill.

Drummond's brother William succeeded their father as Viscount Strathallan in 1893 and, in 1902, succeeded their seventh-cousin-twice-removed, George Drummond, 5th Earl of Perth, to become the 6th Earl of Perth. In 1910 William sold the ancestral Strathmore Estates at Strathallan, Tullibardine, and Machany, which comprised 7,322 acres to industrialist Sir James Roberts, 1st Baronet.

Following William's death on 20 August 1937, Eric Drummond succeeded as 7th Earl of Perth and 12th Viscount Strathallan; he also inherited the titles Lord Drummond of Cargill and Stobhall, Lord Maderty, Lord Drummond of Cromlix, Hereditary thegn of Lennox, Hereditary Steward of Menteith and Strathearn and Chief of Clan Drummond.

He was raised in a Presbyterian family but converted to Catholicism in 1903. That became a hindrance during his career when Prime Minister Ramsay MacDonald vetoed his appointment as ambassador at Washington in 1933. His conversion was most likely caused by his wish to marry a Catholic, the Hon. Angela Mary Constable-Maxwell (1877–1965), the daughter of Marmaduke Constable-Maxwell, 11th Lord Herries of Terregles and Hon. Angela Mary Charlotte Fitzalan-Howard (daughter of the 1st Baron Howard of Glossop), which he did on 20 April 1904. They had four children:

- Lady Margaret Gwendolyn Mary (1905)
- John David Drummond, Viscount Strathallan (1907), inherited his father's titles
- Lady Angela Alice Maryel Drummond (1912)
- Lady Gillian Mary Drummond (1920).

=== Education and early career ===
Drummond was educated at Eton College, where he graduated in 1895. There, he learned French, which later would become an important tool in his diplomatic career. His upbringing in the British establishment helped to pave the way into the diplomatic world as a civil servant.

Drummond is best known for his 13 years as secretary-general in the League of Nations. Before accepting that prestigious position, however, he had served mainly as a private secretary for various British politicians and diplomats, including the Prime Minister H. H. Asquith.

On 20 April 1900, Drummond entered the British Foreign Office as a clerk.

From 1906 to 1908, he was the private secretary of the under-secretary to Lord Fitzmaurice. Between 1908 and 1910, he occupied two functions: précis writer of the foreign secretary Sir Edward Grey and the private secretary of the parliamentary under-secretary, Thomas McKinnon Wood. From 1912 to 1918, Drummond worked as the private secretary of respectively: the prime minister, H. H. Asquith, and the foreign secretaries, Sir Edward Grey and Arthur Balfour. In April to May 1917 he was a member of the Balfour Mission, which was intended to promote cooperation between the British and the Americans during the First World War.

== League of Nations career ==
Between 1918 and 1919, he was a member of the British delegation to the Paris Peace Conference, where he was engaged in the drafting of the Covenant of the League of Nations.

In 1919 he accepted the position of the Secretary-General of the League of Nations, on the recommendation of Lord Robert Cecil.

Before the Paris Peace Conference in 1919 much work had been put into finding a suitable candidate for secretary-general of the newly established League of Nations.

Cecil, who played an important role in drafting the Covenant and organising the League, initially wanted a person with a background in politics for the post; but despite the existence of several candidates, none accepted his proposal. He believed that only somebody of the highest ability would be sufficient for this role. However, after the office would not be given as many powers as initially thought, Cecil reconsidered and sought to find somebody who was a well-trained civil servant and less known as a big political figure. He first approached Maurice Hankey, who for some time showed interest in the position but in the end rejected the offer only ten days prior to the Paris plenary session. In the event that Hankey would turn down the offer, Cecil and the American Edward M. House had developed a contingency plan to substitute Hankey with Sir Eric Drummond.

As early as 1915, Drummond expressed himself favourably towards the establishment of an international organisation. As such, Drummond was involved in negotiations regarding the establishment of the League of Nations. In addition, he was also a British national, which Cecil valued very highly. Drummond was an experienced diplomat and had earned a high reputation during his 19 years at the Foreign Office, which helped him to be considered the best choice available. After some initial doubt in which Drummond expressed anxiety about organising the League, he finally accepted the proposal. At the Paris Peace Conference's plenary session on 28 April 1919, the conference accepted the appointment of Drummond as the first secretary-general of the League of Nations.

=== Establishment of permanent secretariat (1919–1920) ===
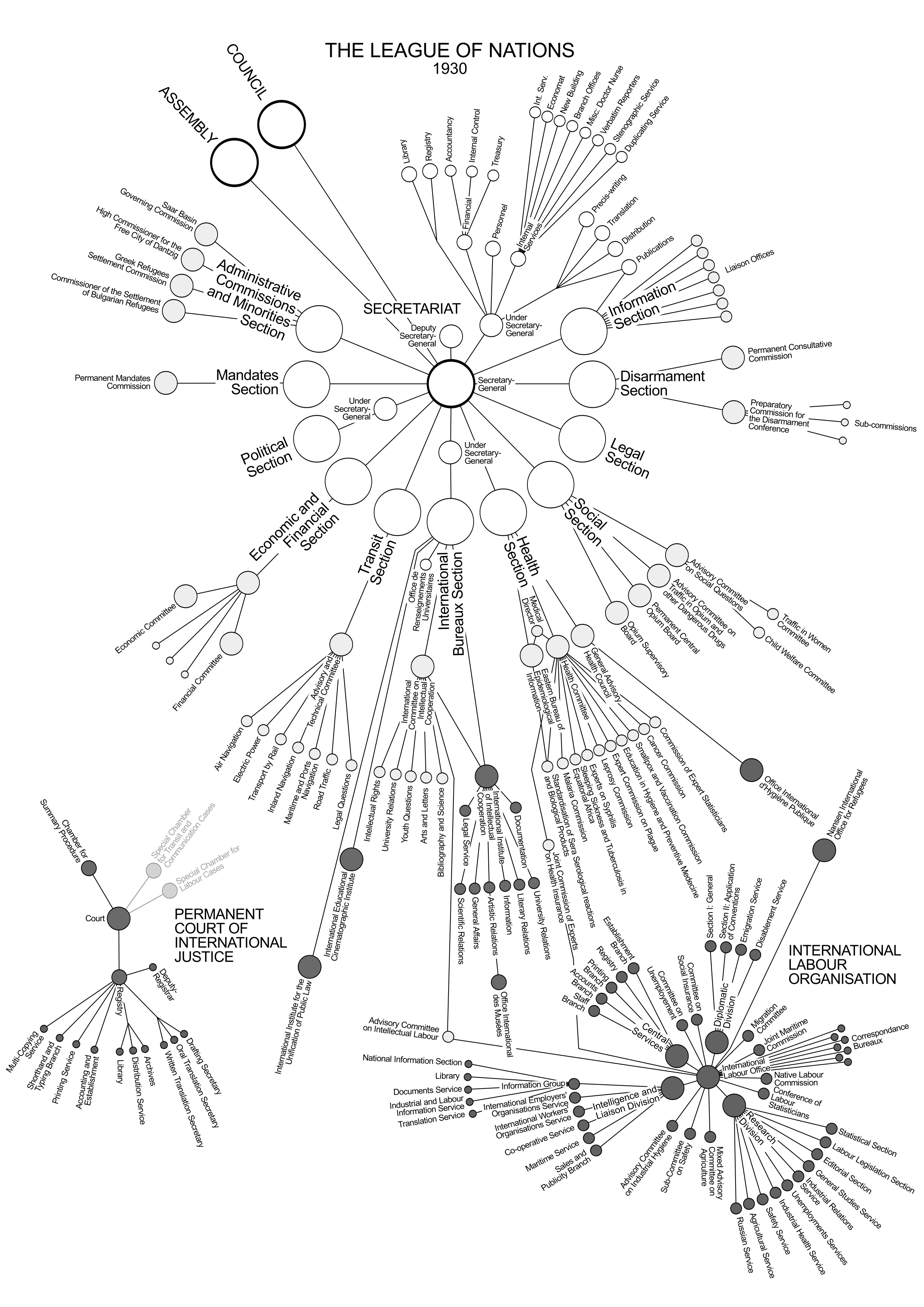
Organization chart of the International Secretariat of the League (here in 1930), established by Drummond.

One of the secretary-general's major deeds was the establishment of a permanent and strictly-international secretariat. No such thing had ever been attempted, and prewar secretariats had largely been confined to the national sphere in both the context of who supplied them and the civil servants who worked there. The creation of an international civil service was not without problems, and administrative leaders thought it unthinkable that such a body would ever be united, loyal or efficient. By August 1920 the secretariat was fully established.

The personnel staffing the secretariat came from over 30 countries and differed in language, religion and training, all of whom were appointed by the League, not by national governments. That once again underscored the difference between the new international body and previous national secretariats. In total, the secretariat came to consist of seven sections: a Mandate Section, an Economic and Financial Section, a Section for Transit and Communication, a Social Section, a Political Section, a Legal Section and an International Bureau Section.

In establishing the permanent secretariat, Drummond pushed back against ideas (promulgated by Sir Maurice Hankey) that great powers would bring their own national staff to the secretariat. Drummond wanted the secretariat to hire staff who owed their allegiance to the League.

=== Leadership style ===
Drummond was not a major political figure and so did not seek to turn the office into a reflection of his personality.

Drummond set about creating the administrative divisions for the League. He chose to appoint only members who supported their nation's government and gave the positions only to members of leading states.

Drummond would read everything that came to his desk and would often call meetings regularly to discuss various issues. The meetings would often take place with various members of governments, which managed to established contact by his appointments to the League. Drummond thus became aware of sensitive information from various governments and nongovernmental organisations but became someone who could be trusted by various politicians worldwide.

He was believed to be highly political behind the scenes but was often forced to do so to appease various nations and because of often lacking support from many governments. One example was his 1920s dealings with Benito Mussolini's policies towards the Balkans, Africa and Europe. Drummond was unable to condemn any of Mussolini's policies publicly, as he did not have the backing of Britain and France. He wanted to maintain good relations with Italy, which helped to render him somewhat impotent.

Drummond took great care to maintain world peace, as was hoped during the creation of the League, but he also appeased nations, rather than keeping them in check against international law. Drummond became regarded as a central hub within the League of Nations for most issues, and he would often pick the ones that interested him the most and delegate the lesser issues to his staff.

Drummond helped to suppress anticolonial claims by indigenous groups.

=== National allegiance of League staff ===
The ideal underpinning the secretariat and those working there was one much resembling a Weberian understanding of bureaucracy that was also seen in Protestant-secular rationalism, the idea of a non-political, neutral, effective and efficient bureaucrat. Drummond admitted, "It is not always those who secure public praise to whom thanks are mainly due, and the work unknown to the public which is done behind the scenes is often a large factor in the success which has been obtained".

The ideal was not always upheld, and national preferences were never really abandoned. New under-secretaries-general who were appointed were more often than not of the same nationality, with candidates of smaller powers excluded. Drummond did not practice what he preached, which created small national islands from which the appointed officials conducted national, rather than international, politics.

In 1929, the Assembly decided to make a thorough investigation of the secretariats, the International Labour Organization and the Permanent Court of International Justice. The minority report showed that the political influence in substantive issues by the secretariats and its main officers was enormous and could not be overlooked. However, that was not recognised by Drummond before the 1950s and until then had readily defended the notion of nonpolitical character of international secretariats.

Despite the political character of the international civil service, the Secretariat came to be widely recognised as an instrument of the highest efficiency and the structural framework became a model for future international civil services, such as seen in the United Nations.

=== Role during crises ===
During Drummond's secretary-generalship were several crises that called for his attention. The League of Nations' Council relied on the willingness of its members to use their militaries to apply its collective security mandate during crises. Many of them centred on border disputes from the collapse of empires after the First World War. As the League got involved in such matters throughout the 1920s with members and non-members alike, Drummond was at the centre of the talks and the negotiations. The League was involved in disputes in Latin America, the Baltics and then China. Peter Yearwood argues that although Drummond was an idealist, as were most other people, he also 'made use' of his connections in politics. Drummond was widely regarded as somebody who shied away from the public and political limelight, despite the high-profile nature of his position. He managed to achieve that but was believed to be highly political behind the scenes. He was often forced to appease various nations because he often lacked support from governments.

One example was his dealings with Benito Mussolini's policies in the 1920s towards the Balkans, Africa and the rest of Europe. Drummond was unable to give a public condemnation of Mussolini's policies, as he had the backing of neither Britain nor France and wanted to maintain good relations with Italy. That was one of the many reasons that helped to render him a somewhat-impotent leader.

Drummond had to perform his function behind the scenes of the League of Nations. He took great care to maintain world peace, as was hoped during the creation of the League of Nations, but he appeased nations, rather than keep them in check against international law. Despite the limitations coming from outside the League of Nations, he largely decided how he would run the office within it since he was very seldom under any kind of supervision. He became regarded as a central hub within the League of Nations for most issues and would often pick the ones that interested him the most and delegate the lesser issues to his staff. He could thus be regarded as a leader who used the office for his own political interests.

Another issue that partly drove Drummond's ambitions and his way of handling the crises presented before him was his religion. A devout Catholic, that had a significant impact in his dealings with the Polish–Lithuanian War early in his career. He strongly urged for a plebiscite to which Poland could agree, most Poles being Catholic. Aldo, Drummond seemed to be pro-active. On the crisis between Russia and Finland over the latter's independence gained after the First World War, Drummond was one of the first to consider a possible solution.

Another important factor of his secretary-generalship was his willingness to step beyond the boundaries given to him in his position. During the crisis over the Chaco War near the very end of Drummond's career at the League, he was praised for being a helpful mediator and for doing more than his position allowed.

=== Mukden Incident ===
One of the less successful moments for Drummond's was one of the most prominent crises of Drummond's career, the Mukden Incident. China allegedly blew up part of a railroad, which Japan then used as an excuse to invade Manchuria. China appealed to the League for measures against Japan.

According to Michael E. Chapman, Drummond's initial response was not that of an imperialistic western leader but that of a bureaucrat. Somewhat limited in his powers, he looked towards the two most powerful Western nations in the region, Britain and the United States, which more or less stated that they were 'too busy' to deal with the crisis at hand.

When the crisis reached its peak, Stimson advised Drummond to "strengthen and support treaty obligations" the Japanese action had caused British discomfort. He was advised to try not to arouse nationalist feelings in Japan. Drummond wanted to be an active player in the crisis but was mostly outplayed by Henry Stimson and Hugh R. Wilson.

He resigned in 1933 and was succeeded by his deputy Joseph Avenol, from France.

== British ambassador in Rome (1933–1939) ==
After leaving the League, Drummond was chosen as candidate to the post of British ambassador to Washington, but his candidacy was vetoed by British Prime Minister Ramsay MacDonald, allegedly because Drummond had converted to Roman Catholicism at 27. Instead, he was appointed British ambassador to Rome in October 1933 and he served there until he left Italy in April 1939. He retired from foreign politics a month later, in May 1939.

Throughout his time in Rome, Drummond found it "difficult to get close to Mussolini". He noted that "[Mussolini]... had to be treated with great caution when he [was] in 'a highly sensitive condition'"

The Italian foreign minister, Galeazzo Ciano, thought that Perth, as he had now become, was convinced that the harsh attitude of France towards Italy was unreasonable. Furthermore, Perth tried to convince the Italians that the British government was "conciliatory" and even went so far as "[...defending] Italian policy." Ciano, whose Italian secret service efficiency allowed him to read many of Perth's reports, states in his diary that the British ambassador had been opposed to the fascist regime when he came to Rome but had developed into a "sincere convert" who "understood and even loved Fascism". Caution must always be employed in using Ciano's statements, but Perth's reports suggested that there was a certain amount of truth in the remarks:

Piers Brendon, who describes Drummond as "peculiarly obtuse even by diplomatic standards", points out that as late as February 1935 he was assuring the Foreign Office that the Italians had "no aggressive intentions" but were "genuinely afraid of overwhelming Abyssinian attack". The Foreign Office was to rebuke him for his feebleness due to his meek protest following the Italian invasion on Ethiopia.

"Perth may have misjudged Mussolini's attitude to Germany but, in the last analysis, even here he was not far wrong, for the limitations of Italian power made it impossible for Mussolini, in 1939, to carry out his intention of siding with Germany in the war".

== Second World War and domestic politics (1939–1951) ==
During the Second World War, Perth worked for the Ministry of Information as a senior bureaucrat. After the war, he served until his death as a deputy leader of the Liberal Party in the House of Lords. His involvement with the party did not slow its decline in electoral and ideological influence.

== Legacy ==
In regards to the security role of the League, his role could be assessed as negligible, especially for the second half of his tenureship, which was characterised by the systematic undermining competition of the great powers, notably Britain and France and the security structure impaired by 19th-century imperialism of the League: its council. His pragmatic and co-operative approach resulted in some successes in the early years of the League, but his role is considered inadequate when it was confronted with issues such as the Manchurian Crisis.

His involvement in setting the organizational infrastructure in areas such as the dealing with refugees, the minority regime and the mandate system could be seen more positively since during his time, especially during the first half of the 1920s, had some successes in resolving and tackling issues, such as the 1925 Greek–Bulgarian Conflict in 1925 and the 1932–1933 Colombia–Peru War.

However, it was the technical issues, such as humanitarian aid and the supervision of a series of "technical organizations and committees", in which he had the most enduring positive legacy. Drummond was part of an international technocratic elite of experts that favoured the initiation of international standards in health and labour issues, the gathering and the sharing of statistical information and a spirit of internationalism to deal with problems.

After his post at the League, he was assigned to the post of ambassador to Fascist Italy. A combination of his own restricted ability to see the overall situation and Britain's strategy of appeasement of fascist regimes that he served could account as a failure and quite possibly the darkest period of his career. The non-resolution of the Ethiopian Crisis had the effects of undermining League's security role and sending the wrong signals to both Mussolini and Hitler. Drummond, as the British ambassador to Italy, was one of the actors who failed to anticipate the negative results of the British appeasement policy. According to Gordon Craig and Felix Gilbert "His handling of the political tasks of the League [of Nations] has been criticized as over cautious, but he did not lack courage for decisive action when such action was necessary for the maintenance of the authority of the League. His slow somewhat hesitant approach was useful in avoiding disappointments and setbacks and contributed to the League's steady gain in prestige."

Susan Pederson described Drummond as "highly organized, meticulous, good at selecting staff)... and able to mediate disputes."

== Honours ==
During his life, Drummond received a variety of titles for his accomplishments. He was awarded the following by King George V:

- Companion of the Order of the Bath (CB) 22 June 1914.
- Knight Commander Order of St Michael and St George (KCMG) 21 December 1916.
- Knight Grand Cross of the Order of St Michael and St George (GCMG) 30 January 1934.

== See also ==
- United Kingdom and the League of Nations

== Bibliography ==
- "The Secretariat of the League of Nations" (1931), Paper read before the institute of public administration, 19 March 1931, English.
- "Ten Years of World Cooperation" (1930), book, published by the Secretariat of the League of Nations. Foreword by Drummond, English.
- "The International Secretariat of the Future; Lessons from Experience by a Group of Former Officials of the League of Nations." (1944), book, co-authored by Drummond, English.
- Procès-verbal... du Conseil de la Société des nations... (Minutes of the Council of the League of Nations (1920–24), Speech. English.
- The League of Nations BBC National Lectures (1933)
- The organisation of peace and the Dumbarton Oaks proposals (1945), pamphlets on Dumberton Oaks proposals, Vol. 8, no. 1
- Annuaire de l'Association yougoslave de droit international: Année (Journal, French)
- Procès-verbal... du Conseil de la Société des nations = Minutes of the... Council of the League of Nations (1921).Book
- Germany after the war: proposals of a Liberal Party Committee by Eric Drummond (1944). Book.
- Ten years of world co-operation. Published by League of Nations. Foreword by Drummond (1930)
- Procès-verbal... du Conseil de la Société des nations = Minutes of the... Council of the League of Nations Minutes of the... Council of the League of Nations. 1st–15th session, Jan. 16, 1920–19 Nov. 1921. Book
- The aims of the League of Nations (1929). Book
- Les réfugiés Russes : Lettre du Comité International de la Croix-Rouge et réponse du Secrétaire Général by League of Nations (1921). Book in French
- Dix ans de coopération intellectuelle (1930). Book in French
- Speech made by Sir Eric Drummond, Secretary-general of the League of nations by Conference for the Codification of International Law (1930). Book
- Brief van James Eric Drummond (1876–1951) aan Willem Jan Mari van Eysinga (1878–1961) (1921). Book in Dutch
- Correspondence respecting League of Nations matters, Feb. 1918-Oct. 1924 [accumulated at the Foreign Office during the first part of his term of office as Secretary-general of the League of Nations] (1924). Book

== Sources ==
- Chapman, Michael E. Fidgeting over Foreign Policy: Henry L. Stimson and the Shenyang Incident, 1931. Oxford Journals: Diplomatic History, Volume 37, Issue 4 (2013).
- Dykmann, Klaas & Naumann, Katja, eds. Changes from the "Margins": Non-European Actors, Ideas and Strategies in International Organizations (Leipzig, 2014).
- Craig, Gordon A., and Gilbert, Felix. eds. The Diplomats 1919–1939 (Princeton University Press, 1994).
- Barros, James. Office Without Power: Secretary-General Sir Eric Drummond 1919–1933 (Oxford 1979).
- Lorna Lloyd. "Drummond, (James) Eric, seventh earl of Perth (1876–1951)," Oxford Dictionary of National Biography, Oxford University Press, 2004; online ed, January 2011 accessed 7 October 2014
- Lloyd, Lorna. "The League of Nations and the Settlement of Disputes" World Affairs. Vol. 157, No. 4, Woodrow Wilson and the League of Nations: Part One (Spring 1995).
- Macfadyen, D.; Davies, M.; Carr, M.; Burley, J. 2019. Eric Drummond and his Legacies: The League of Nations and the Beginnings of Global Governance. Palgrave, 2019 online
- Walters, F. P., A History of the League of Nations, Oxford University Press, 1952. (available online)
- Yearwood, Peter J. Guarantee of Peace: The League of Nations in British Policy 1914–1925. Oxford Scholarship Online (2009)

Diplomatic posts
Preceded by The Lord Tyrrell	Principal Private Secretary to the Foreign Secretary; 1915–1919	Succeeded by The Lord Vansittart
Preceded by Sir Ronald Graham	Ambassador of the United Kingdom to Italy; 1933–1939	Succeeded by Sir Percy Loraine
Positions in intergovernmental organisations
New institution	Secretary-General of the League of Nations; 1920–1933	Succeeded by (France) Joseph Avenol
Peerage of Scotland
Preceded by William Huntly Drummond	Earl of Perth; 1937–1951	Succeeded by John David Drummond
