= Anne-Marie Walters =

Women's Auxiliary Air Force officer for the United Kingdom

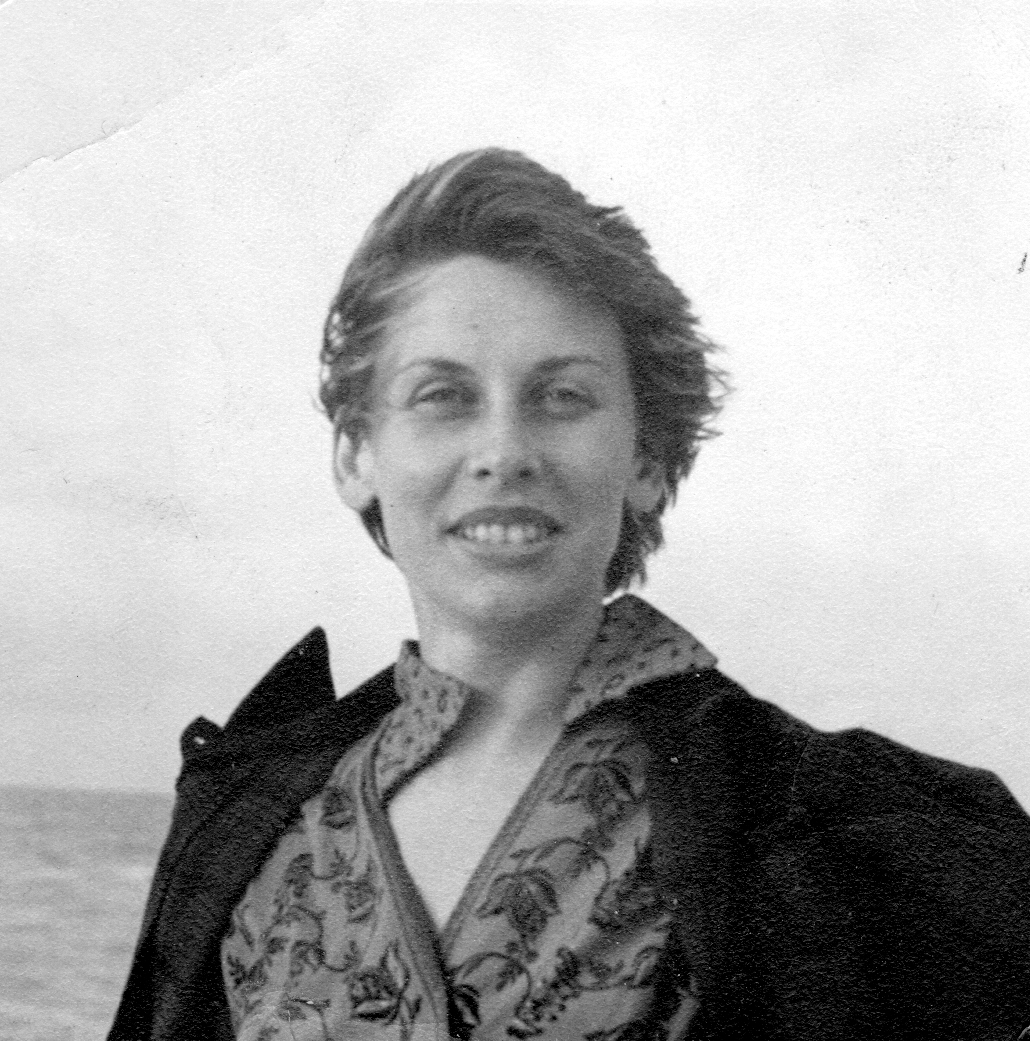
- Photographed in 1967
- Born: 16 March 1923; Geneva, Switzerland
- Died: 2 October 1998 (aged 75); La Baume-de-Transit, France
- Military career
- Allegiance: United Kingdom; France
- Branch: Women's Auxiliary Air Force, Special Operations Executive, French Resistance
- Service years: 1941-1944
- Rank: Section Officer, Field agent (courier)
- Nickname: Colette
- Units: SOE F Section, Wheelwright network
- Awards: MBE, Croix de Guerre, Médaille de la Résistance française
- Other work: Author, Editor and Translator

Walters and the Wheelwright circuit were based in Gers Department.

Anne-Marie Walters MBE (16 March 1923 – 2 October 1998), code name Colette, was a WAAF officer recruited into the United Kingdom's clandestine Special Operations Executive (SOE) organization during World War II. SOE agents allied themselves with groups resisting the occupation of their countries by Axis powers. The purpose of SOE was to conduct espionage, sabotage, and reconnaissance in occupied countries. The SOE supplied resistance groups with weapons and equipment parachuted in from England.

Walters was a courier for the Wheelwright network, working from January 1944 until August 1944 in southwestern France. Twenty-years old when she arrived in France, she was, next to Sonya Butt, the youngest female agent of SOE.

One day I am sent to Auch to collect blank and stamped travel permits, then next I go to Tarbes to take some money to a man who works there. The third I cycle to take a message to the wireless operator or someone else. Then I'm off for three days to Tarbes and Montréjeau where I have to wait for a reply.

— Walters, on the life of a courier in occupied France

My family might not have recognized me had they seen me sitting in a third-class carriage with a beret tipped low over my forehead, wearing an old raincoat and generally looking half-witted while eating a chunk of bread and sausages.

— Walters, on the life of a courier in occupied France

== Early life ==
Walters was born on 16 March 1923 in Geneva to an English father, Francis Paul Walters, who was Deputy Secretary-General of the League of Nations, and a French mother. She pursued her studies in the International School of Geneva, founded in 1924 by officials of the League of Nations and the International Labour Organization, in collaboration with educators from the Institut Jean-Jacques Rousseau. The family left Switzerland for England after the outbreak of World War II and Walters initially joined the WAAF in 1941 (Service Number 2001920). On 6 July 1943 she was recruited into SOE and during the summer and autumn of that year underwent training as an agent at the SOE Special Training School 23 at Loch Morar, Scotland.

== World War II ==
=== In France with SOE ===
SOE's appraisal of Walters after the completion of her training was cautionary. "She is well-educated, intelligent, quick, practical, and cunning...[but] She will not hesitate always to make use of her physical attractiveness in gaining influence over men. In this respect she is likely to have a disturbing effect in any group in which she is a member." Nevertheless, she was approved to be sent to France as an agent of SOE.

The first attempt to parachute her into France in December 1943 failed because of bad weather over the drop zone and ended with a return to England and a crash-landing at a diversionary airfield because of widespread fog. She suffered a minor head injury in the landing.

In the company of a fellow agent, Claude Arnault (code name Néron, but more commonly called Jean-Claude), she was successfully dropped into the Armagnac area in SW France on the night of 4 January 1944, to join George Starr's WHEELWRIGHT network (also called circuit and reseau). Walters acted as a courier for Starr until after D-Day. Yvonne Cormeau was Starr's wireless operator. Arnault, who was the same age as Walters, was an explosives expert. Walter's cover story was that she was a student from Paris recovering from pneumonia who was visiting a farmer friend of her fathers. She stayed with the family in their farmhouse at Mamoulens. Starr's headquarters were 3 kilometres (1.9 miles) distant at Castelnau-sur-l'Auvignon. Early in her stay in France, Starr visited her almost every day and she had to interrupt work to chat with him. She said she wished for more independence. In her book Walters never mentions the presence of Cormeau, the efficient wireless operator.

As a courier, Walters traveled widely by bus, train, bicycle, and charcoal-powered vehicle around southwestern France. One of her first jobs was to organize the flight to Spain across the Pyrenees of a group of 15 members of the French Resistance who had escaped from a French prison. She also helped convey several suitcases full of explosives to Toulouse to blow up a powder factory.

Walters, in the words of local historian Raymond Escholier, was well liked by the resistance fighters, the marquisards. She was regarded as "the true sister of the marquisards."

=== Battle of Castelnau ===
With the Normandy Invasion on 6 June 1944, the maquis of the resistance became bolder and the Germans more aggressive in suppressing any opposition to their occupation of France. Starr collected about 300 men, one-half French and one-half Spanish, and arms at Castelnau sur l'Auvignon, but on 21 June an estimated 2,000 soldiers of the German army attacked Starr's men. During the battle, Walters distributed hand grenades to the maquisards, buried incriminating documents, and collected SOE money and took it with her when she and the maquisards withdrew from the village. Nineteen of the maquisards were killed. After the battle, Starr and his men joined with other factions of the resistance to form the "Armagnac Battalion" commanded by a French officer, Maurice Parisot, which harried the Germany army in the region.

=== Starr wars ===
Walter's appraisal of Starr was unflattering. She later said, "[Starr] is strictly an agent and neither a politician nor a military strategist...the guerrilla action he commanded was most unsuccessful." Starr was even more critical of his youthful courier. Among his complaints about Walters, was that she wore "high Paris fashion," thus violating his principle that couriers should be inconspicuous. He ordered her to leave France. On 31 July 1944, Starr sent a message to SOE headquarters in London explaining his action. "Have had to send Colette [Walters] back because she is undisciplined in spite of my efforts to train her...Most indiscreet. Very man-mad, also disobedient...totally unsuitable." However, he acknowledged her courage and willingness to undertake any mission. She left France approximately 1 August 1944 and traveled through Spain en route to Algiers.

In Algiers, Walters met with British military authorities who proposed that she return to France to assist the military personnel involved in Operation Jedburgh. She was agreeable, but SOE vetoed that proposal and ordered her to return to London.

When Walters returned to London, she wrote a report (which has not survived) to Maurice Buckmaster, head of the French section of SOE. Later, in another report, she said that while she was in France Starr had ordered her to be thrown into prison, accused her of having an affair with another agent and of spreading stories that he was having an affair with a female SOE agent. Walters praised Starr's courage and abilities, but criticized him severely on other counts. Starr, she said, had a Russian bodyguard named Buresie who "carried out absolutely horrible tortures" on captured French collaborators. She said Starr was under the influence of his bodyguard and cited several examples of tortures. She added, however, that "Had [Starr] not been influenced in all this....I am sure that he would never have started it [the tortures]."

On 1 November 1944, Starr, who had returned to London, was interviewed by SOE. He recounted "with relish" an incident of torture, causing consternation in the SOE although the interviewers said that he could not be blamed for the tortures committed by the French Resistance. In February 1945, a court of enquiry with testimony from Starr, Walters, and others took place. The part of the transcript of the enquiry containing Walter's testimony has disappeared from the record. On 28 February, the conclusion of the "rather perfunctory court of enquiry" (in the words of M.R.D. Foot), was that "there is no justification whatever for any imputation against Lt. Col. Starr of inhumanity or cruel treatment to any prisoner at any time under his control or under the control or troops or resistance forces under his immediate command or control."

== Honours and awards ==
On 17 July 1945, in recognition of her "personal courage and willingness to undergo any danger," Walters was awarded the MBE (Civil list) for her work in occupied France and, from France, the Croix de Guerre and the Médaille de la Reconnaissance française.

Member of the Order of the British Empire (Civil)
1939–1945 Star	France and Germany Star	Defence Medal	War Medal
Croix de Guerre (France)		Médaille de la Résistance française	

== Later life ==
In 1946, Walters published an account of her experiences in Moondrop to Gascony (Macmillan, 1946; Moho Books, 2009). The book provides a portrait of Starr (Le Patron in the book), although not referring directly to the problems between the two of them, and also of Arnault (Jean-Claude in the book) with whom Walters may have been romantically involved. Moondrop to Gascony won the John Llewellyn Rhys Prize in 1947.

After the war, she lived in the United States, Spain, and France and was a translator of Spanish, an editor, and owned a literary agency under her married name Anne-Marie Comert. In her later years, she suffered from Alzheimer's disease. She died in France on 2 October 1998, at the age of 75.
