= Ricky (2009 film) =

- Film poster
- Directed by: François Ozon
- Written by: François Ozon; Rose
- Produced by: Chris Bolzli; Claudie Ossard; Vieri Razzini
- Starring: Alexandra Lamy; Sergi López; Mélusine Mayance
- Cinematography: Jeanne Lapoirie
- Edited by: Muriel Breton
- Music by: Philippe Rombi
- Distributed by: Le Pacte
- Release dates: 6 February 2009 (Berlin); 11 February 2009 (France)
- Running time: 90 minutes
- Country: France
- Language: French
- Box office: $2.5 million

Ricky is a 2009 French fantasy film directed by François Ozon about a human baby who develops a set of functional wings, and how the parents cope with the child's abnormality.

== Plot ==
Katie (Alexandra Lamy) lives with her daughter Lisa (Mélusine Mayance) in welfare housing in eastern Paris. Their family is disrupted when Katie falls in love with Paco (Sergi López), her Spanish co-worker in a cosmetics factory. A baby is born after Paco moves in. The child, who they name Ricky (Arthur Peyret), becomes a source of anxiety and unwelcome surprise as he is noisy and demanding. To make matters worse, Ricky's shoulder blades begin growing wings. The baby also starts to fly. He becomes a public curiosity further throwing the family into disarray and fear for Ricky's safety. Katie and Paco put a rope on Ricky so he won't fly away. They let go of Ricky as Katie is holding the rope and everyone is surprised to see Ricky flying. But when Katie accidentally let go the rope Ricky flies away and though they chase after him, he flies away. Katie and Paco think Ricky is dead. Katie is despondent and about to commit suicide when she hears Ricky's voice and his flapping wings, as he returns.

== Cast ==
- Alexandra Lamy as Katie
- Sergi López as Paco
- Mélusine Mayance as Lisa
- Arthur Peyret as Ricky
- André Wilms as The doctor
- Jean-Claude Bolle-Reddat as The journalist

== Reception ==
The film holds a 63% approval rating on review aggregator Rotten Tomatoes, based on 16 critic reviews. Metacritic, which uses a weighted average, gave the film a score of 53/100 based on nine critics, indicating "mixed or average" reviews.
