= Cynthia Jebb, Baroness Gladwyn =

English political hostess and diarist

The Right Honourable The Lady Gladwyn
- Born: Cynthia Noble; 20 November 1898; Newcastle upon Tyne, Northumberland, England
- Died: 21 September 1990 (aged 91); Bramfield, Suffolk, England
- Known for: diaries
- Spouse: Gladwyn Jebb (m. 1929)
- Children: 3
- Parent(s): Sir Saxton William Armstrong Noble; Celia Brunel
- Relatives: Tatiana de Rosnay (granddaughter)

Cynthia Jebb, Baroness Gladwyn (née Noble; 20 November 1898 – 21 September 1990) was an English political hostess and diarist. She was noted as the wife of the UK's representative on the Security Council of the United Nations and as a hostess in Paris where her husband was the British ambassador.

== Life ==
She was the last of four children born to Celia Brunel James and Sir Saxton William Armstrong Noble, third baronet of Ardmore and Ardardan. He was a entrepreneurial civil engineer and they lived at Jesmond Dene, Newcastle upon Tyne where she born on 20 November 1898 and baptised quickly (as she was expected to die).

One of her grandfathers was A.C. James a housemaster at Eton College who was married to Florence Brunel. Her other grandfather chaired the arms and shipping company Armstrong Whitworth. Her middle name was Brunel and she was the great granddaughter of Isambard Kingdom Brunel.

She had a remarkable memory and this and conversation supplemented the informal education she received at boarding school. The formal focus of her study was literature and music.

Her brother, Marc, was killed in the First World War. After the war she formed a variety of friends. She married Gladwyn Jebb in 1929 and she became the wife of an ambitious diplomat in the Foreign Office. During the 1930s they spent three years in Rome and they had three children. By 1935 they were back in London but her husband was promoted with the Foreign Office which earned him a knighthood in 1949.

The following year they were sent to New York where they became the popular centre of attention as Gladwyn Jebb was the British representative on the Security Council which was exercising its power during the Korean Crisis. In 1954 they went to Paris where she became a hostess at the centre of French society whilst her husband was Britain's ambassador. She organised visits including those of Royalty and Prime Ministers during the six years that she ran their residence. During their stay the Suez Crisis made Anglo French diplomacy very important and when they left in 1960 General de Gaulle held a dinner for them. In 1959 it was reported that she had renovated their Paris home in the style of Napoleon's sister, Pauline, after consulting with researchers at the Louvre.

Her husband became Baron Gladwyn in 1960 when he retired a diplomat and became a Liberal Front Bench peer in the House of Lords. They spent their time at their flat in London and at Bramfield Hall in Suffolk where she entertained including a generous evening during the Aldeburgh Festival.

In 1995 Miles Jebb published her diaries.
