= Gladwyn Jebb =

British diplomat (1900–1996)

The Right Honourable The Lord Gladwyn GCMG GCVO CB PC
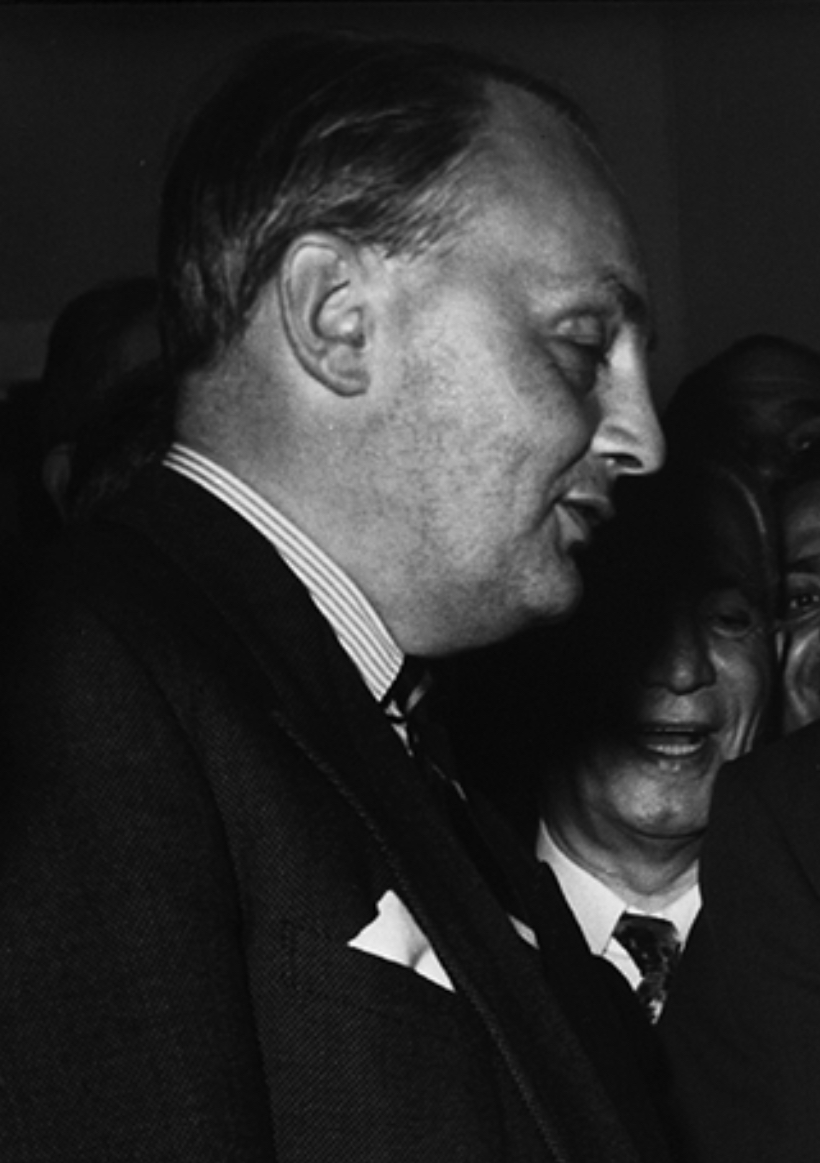
- Jebb in 1951

Member of the House of Lords
- Lord Temporal
- In office 12 April 1960 – 24 October 1996
- Preceded by: Peerage created
- Succeeded by: The 2nd Baron Gladwyn

Member of the European Parliament for the United Kingdom
- In office 1973–1976

British Ambassador to France
- In office 1954–1960
- Preceded by: Sir Oliver Harvey
- Succeeded by: Sir Pierson Dixon

Permanent Representative of the United Kingdom to the United Nations
- In office 1950–1954
- Preceded by: Sir Alexander Cadogan
- Succeeded by: Sir Pierson Dixon

Secretary-General of the United Nations
- Acting
- In office 24 October 1945 – 2 February 1946
- Preceded by: Seán Lester (as Secretary-General of the League of Nations)
- Succeeded by: Trygve Lie

Personal details
- Born: Hubert Miles Gladwyn Jebb; 25 April 1900 Firbeck, Yorkshire, England
- Died: 24 October 1996 (aged 96) Bramfield, Suffolk, England
- Party: Liberal (1960–1988); Liberal Democrats (from 1988)
- Other political affiliations: Liberal and Democratic Group (1973–1976)
- Spouse: Cynthia Noble (m. 1929; died 1990)
- Children: 3
- Relatives: Tatiana de Rosnay (granddaughter)
- Education: Sandroyd School; Eton College
- Alma mater: Magdalen College, Oxford

Hubert Miles Gladwyn Jebb, 1st Baron Gladwyn (25 April 1900 – 24 October 1996), was a prominent British civil servant, diplomat and politician who served as the acting secretary-general of the United Nations between 1945 and 1946.

== Early life and career ==
The son of Sydney Gladwyn Jebb JP, of Firbeck Hall, Yorkshire (a grandson of Sir Joshua Jebb and a maternal nephew of the 5th and 6th Viscounts Melville), and Rose Eleanor Chichester (daughter of Maj.-Gen. Hugh Chichester), Jebb attended Sandroyd School and Eton College before graduating from Magdalen College, Oxford, with a first class honours degree in history.

Jebb entered the British Diplomatic Service in 1924 and served in Tehran, where he got to know Harold Nicolson and Vita Sackville-West. He later served in Rome and at the Foreign Office in Westminster, where he served as Private Secretary to the Head of the Diplomatic Service.

== Personal life ==
In 1929, Jebb married Cynthia Noble, daughter of Sir Saxton Noble, 3rd Baronet. She was a granddaughter of the gun-developer Sir Andrew Noble, 1st Baronet, and a great-granddaughter of Isambard Kingdom Brunel. The couple had three children, one son, Miles, and two daughters: Vanessa, who married the historian Hugh Thomas, and Stella, who married the scientist Joel de Rosnay and was the mother of the French writer Tatiana de Rosnay.

== Second World War ==
For part of the War of 1939 to 1945, Jebb left the Foreign Office to serve as the Chief Executive Officer for the Special Operations Executive, where he was from 1940 to 1942. On his return to the Foreign Office, Jebb asked to be posted to Madagascar, but this application was rejected, and he was sent to the Treasury for economic training.

== Acting UN Secretary-General ==
After the Second World War, Jebb served as Executive Secretary of the Preparatory Commission of the United Nations from August 1945 to October 1945 and served as Acting United Nations Secretary-General from October 1945 to February 1946, when the first Secretary-General was appointed, Trygve Lie.

Jebb remains the only UN Secretary-General or Acting Secretary-General to come from a permanent member state of the UN Security Council.

== Ambassador ==
Returning to London, Jebb served as Deputy to the Foreign Secretary Ernest Bevin at the Conference of Foreign Ministers before serving as the Foreign Office's United Nations Adviser (1946–1947). He represented the United Kingdom at the Brussels Treaty Permanent Commission with personal rank of ambassador.

Jebb became the United Kingdom's Ambassador to the United Nations from 1950 to 1954 and to Paris from 1954 to 1960. He was the first permanent UN representative of the United Kingdom. In the latter role, he was angered that secret negotiations between the British, French and Israelis in advance of the Suez invasion in 1956 took place at Sèvres without his knowledge and, in certain respects, that he was sidelined by Prime Minister Harold Macmillan at the Paris "big power" summit in 1960.

Jebb's rather "grand" manner caused Foreign Secretary Selwyn Lloyd to coin an epigram: "You're a deb, Sir Gladwyn Jebb".

== Political career ==
Jebb was knighted in 1949. On 12 April 1960 Jebb was created a hereditary peer and as Baron Gladwyn, of Bramfield in the County of Suffolk. He became involved in politics as a member of the Liberal Party. He was Deputy Leader of the Liberals in the House of Lords from 1965 to 1988 and spokesman on foreign affairs and defence. An ardent European, he served as a Member of the European Parliament from 1973 to 1976, where he was also the Vice-President of the Parliament's Political Committee. Jebb unsuccessfully contested the Suffolk seat in the European Parliament in 1979.

When asked in the early 1960s why he had joined the Liberal Party, he replied that the Liberals were a party without a general and that he was a general without a party. Like many Liberals, he passionately believed that education was the key to social reform.

== Death ==
Jebb died in Bramfield, Suffolk, on 24 October 1996 at the age of 96.

== Honours ==
- GCMG, 1954 (preceded by a KCMG in 1949 and a CMG in 1942)
- GCVO, 1957
- Companion of the Bath, 1947
- Grand Croix de la Légion d'Honneur, 1957

== Publications and papers ==
Publications by Jebb include:

- Is Tension Necessary?, 1959
- Peaceful Coexistence, 1962
- The European Idea, 1966
- Half-way to 1984, 1967
- De Gaulle's Europe, or, Why the General says No, 1969
- Europe after de Gaulle, 1970
- The Memoirs of Lord Gladwyn, 1972

Jebb's papers were deposited at the Churchill Archives Centre of the University of Cambridge by his son, Miles Jebb, 2nd Baron Gladwyn, between 1998 and 2000.

== In popular culture ==
In an episode of The Goon Show broadcast on 16 February 1959 entitled "The Gold Plate Robbery", Major Bloodnok – in his rôle as 'the last British Ambassador in Marrakesh' – is heard to muse aloud "Now, for a kip on full Ambassador's pay. Gad! I wonder what old Gladwyn Jebb's doing".

== Bibliography ==
- Greenwood, Sean (2008). Titan at the foreign office : Gladwyn Jebb and the shaping of the modern world. History of International Relations, Diplomacy, and Intelligence. Vol. 5. Leiden: Martinus Nijhoff Publishers. ISBN 978-90-04-16970-8. OCLC 231834519.

Diplomatic posts
Preceded by Sir Oliver Harvey	British Ambassador to France; 1954–1960	Succeeded by Sir Pierson Dixon
Preceded by Sir Alexander Cadogan	Permanent Representative of the United Kingdom to the United Nations; 1950–1954	Succeeded by Sir Pierson Dixon
Positions in intergovernmental organisations
Preceded by (Republic of Ireland) Seán Lester as Secretary-General of the League of Nations	Acting Secretary-General of the United Nations; October 1945 – February 1946	Succeeded by (Norway) Trygve Lie
Peerage of the United Kingdom
New creation	Baron Gladwyn; 1960–1996; Member of the House of Lords (1960–1996)	Succeeded by Miles Jebb
