= Sarah's Key (novel) =

French novel

- French cover (pocket edition).
- Author: Tatiana de Rosnay
- Original title: Elle s'appelait Sarah
- Language: English
- Genre: Holocaust
- Publisher: France Loisirs (book club, September 2006); Héloïse d'Ormesson (retail, March 2007)
- Publication date: September 2006
- Publication place: France
- English publication date: 12 June 2007
- Media type: Print
- Pages: 294
- ISBN: 978-0-7195-2452-3
- Dewey Decimal: 16

Sarah's Key is a historical fiction novel by Franco-British author Tatiana de Rosnay, composed in English but first published in French translation as Elle s'appelait Sarah in September 2006. Two main parallel plots are followed through the book. The first is that of ten-year-old Sarah Starzynski, a Jewish girl born in Paris, who is arrested with her parents during the Vel' d'Hiv Roundup. Before they go, she locks her four-year-old brother in a cupboard, thinking the family should be back in a few hours. The second plot follows Julia Jarmond, an American journalist living in Paris, who is asked to write an article in honour of the 60th anniversary of the roundup.

The book was rejected by more than 20 publishers before being published by Héloïse d'Ormesson, whom she had profiled in French Elle in 2005.

According to Rosnay's French publisher, Sarah's Key had sold 758,000 copies worldwide by November 2008 and had passed two million copies worldwide by late 2010, reaching this milestone even before the film version was released. Rosnay's U.S. publisher suggests that the global total had reached four million copies by the northern summer of 2011, and eleven million copies by 2020.

== Plot ==
=== July 1942 ===
The first plot follows the Starzynski family. On 16 July 1942, French police raided the Starzynski apartment in Paris, arresting ten-year-old Sarah and her parents. First, the family is sent to the Vélodrome d'Hiver, an enclosed stadium that housed a bicycling track for racing. The captors held more than 7,000 Jews, mostly women and children in the stadium, which was made to hold far fewer people, and they were eventually sent to Drancy, a refugee camp, to separate the men from the women and children and then later, they separated the mothers from the children. Later, the readers find out they were all sent to Auschwitz.

Sarah, now on her own, is still tormented by thoughts of her brother locked in the secret closet at home, and tries to escape with Rachel, another Jewish girl at the camp. They are caught, but the officer that catches them is a man that Sarah knows from her old life. She begs him to let her go to rescue her brother. He reluctantly helps them escape and even gives the two girls money. The girls find refuge with an elderly couple who takes them into their house, but Rachel falls ill with what is probably diphtheria or typhus fever. The couple, Jules and Geneviève Dufaure, are compelled to call a Nazi doctor, who reports to the Nazi officials that the elderly couple is hiding Jewish children. The Nazis arrive and search for more children, but without finding Sarah they take Rachel away and she presumably dies. Jules and Geneviève dress Sarah in boy's clothes (her hair had been cut short at Drancy) and help her get to her former home in Paris. She had been keeping the key to the closet in her pocket the whole time. She knocks at the door, screaming her beloved younger brother's name. A young boy, Edouard (Bertrand's father) opens the door and Sarah rushes into the house, nearly kicking the door to her former room and quickly opens the closet. She collapses and starts to cry hysterically. Edouard's father comes into the room and removes Michel from the closet and laid him on Edouard's bed, who had died by then (shriveled up), hidden in the closet waiting for Sarah.

=== Julia Jarmond ===
The second plot follows Julia Jarmond. She was born in Boston, Massachusetts but moved to Paris in her early twenties and married a Frenchman named Bertrand Tezac and had a daughter, Zoë. Sometime prior to the action of the book, Bertrand had cheated on Julia with a woman named Amélie after Julia had suffered a miscarriage. The apartment they are thinking of moving into happens to have belonged to the Starzynski family prior to being inhabited by Bertrand's grandparents and father, who was then about Sarah's age, but neither Julia nor Bertrand are aware of this. Julia's boss, Joshua, asks her to write an article about the Vel' d'Hiv Roundup, as the 60th anniversary was nearing. Julia tries to find out more about the roundup and through her research and questioning of Bertrand's grandmother discovers whom the apartment once belonged to. When Julia finds out and tells Bertrand, he does not seem to care. Julia becomes obsessed with the story of young Sarah Starzynski, who was recorded to have been taken to Beaune-la-Rolande, but was not recorded to have returned nor taken to a gas chamber. She does more research and finds out she ran away, but she loses trace of her after that. She does a little more research and becomes in touch with descendants of Jules and Geneviève and they tell her that Sarah had continued to live with the family into her teens, but she grew up an introverted, sad young woman.

Julia finds out she is pregnant, but Bertrand says she must either choose between an abortion or a divorce. She chooses to have the baby. She discovers that Sarah married and had a son. Sarah had died when her son William was a young boy and Julia arranges to meet him in his home of Italy. He is very reluctant to learn of his mother's story and asks that Julia not contact him again. Weeks later, the same night Bertrand's grandmother has a stroke, William shows up in France, finally ready to hear Sarah's story. After Julia delivers her daughter she and Bertrand part ways; Bertrand moves in with Amélie and Julia does not feel comfortable about moving into the apartment they were to have moved into, with its sad history of Sarah, Michel and their parents. She moves to New York City with Zoë and the baby. William, having uprooted his own life too in the wake of everything he has learned about his mother, also moves to New York City and eventually tracks down Julia again. He shares with her some of Sarah's writings that he found in his father's drawer. It is revealed that Sarah did not merely die from a car accident as previously believed, but had killed herself intentionally, unable to bear with the pain of her secret past any longer.

== Characters ==
=== Sarah Starzynski ===
Sarah Starzynski is one of the two protagonists of the book. Ten years old, she lives in Paris in July 1942, with her parents and brother. When she gets taken to Beaune-la-Rolande, she desperately tries to escape. After she finds her brother's body, she grows up a broken woman and eventually dies by suicide (the official story is that she died in a car accident but Julia discovers that she deliberately crashed her car into an oncoming tractor-trailer truck).

=== Julia Jarmond ===
Julia Jarmond is the other protagonist of the book. She was born and raised in Brookline, Massachusetts, but always preferred France over America and moved to Paris in her early twenties. She marries Bertrand Tezac and has a daughter, but they are no longer in love when the book starts. She is deeply touched by Sarah's story and names her second daughter after her.

=== Other characters ===
- Michel Starzynski, Sarah's four-year-old brother, is an important character, as he is Sarah's motivation to escape her captors. He is not taken to the camp, but dies in the secret room where Sarah locked him when the family was taken to Vel' d'Hiv.
- Wladyslaw & Rywka Starzynski are Sarah and Michel's parents who are both transported to Auschwitz for extermination. Rywka is deeply marked by the events she witnesses and it seems that she would willingly allow herself to be killed until they separate her from Sarah - this is when the mother Sarah knew and remembered reemerges. Wladyslaw Starzynski is willing to fight, but he is taken almost immediately from the French camp to Auschwitz where he is sent to the gas chambers.
- Jules and Geneviève Dufaure are an older couple who find Sarah and Rachel hiding in their doghouse after they escaped from the concentration camp. The couple take the two girls in to live in their house. The Dufaures try to hide the two girls from any Nazi Police, but eventually Rachel is taken away by the Nazi Police when the Dufaures must find medical help for her because she is deathly ill. Sarah tries to leave by herself to find her brother in their apartment in Paris, but the couple goes with her to then find her brother dead. Sarah stays with the couple and their family until adulthood when she moves to the United States to become a nanny.
- William Rainsferd is Sarah's only child and lives in Lucca. He does not know much about his mother's past and did not want to know much at the beginning. He later reaches out to Julia and learns all about his mother's past, something that moves him greatly.
- Richard Rainsferd is Sarah's husband and William's father.
- Rachel is Sarah's friend who escapes with her. She dies of what appears to be typhus or diphtheria.
- Zoë Tezac is Julia's older daughter. She is 11 years old at the beginning of the book and 13 at the end. She is Julia's support system and is described as a "calm and mature" child. She takes a keen interest in Julia's quest to find Sarah.
- Bertrand Tezac is Julia's husband who is, as Zoë describes him, "totally rude". He is no longer in love with Julia and has an affair with his friend Amelie.
- Amelie is Bertrand's girlfriend. Julia recalls an event from the past when she found out her husband was having an affair with Amelie. Later in the novel, Julia suspects that Bertrand is still in love with Amelie. They get a divorce and he admits his love for Amelie.
- Christophe is Julia's friend in Paris when she first moved to Paris she lived with him and Herve.
- Herve is Julia's friend in Paris.
- Guillaume is a friend of Herve and Christophe; some of his family were taken during the roundup. He helps to give Julia some information about it.
- Mamé is Bertrand's grandmother and the current owner of Sarah's former apartment. Her name is not revealed throughout the book, but she is very old and no longer lucid, suffering from Alzheimer's. She resides in a home.
- Édouard Tezac is Bertrand's father who is present when Sarah finds Michel's body in 1942. He helps Julia uncover the secrets of Sarah's life later in the novel.
- André Tezac is Mamé's husband and Édouard's father who is also present in 1942 and takes Michel's body out of the closet.
- Sarah is Julia's younger daughter by Bertrand.

== Awards ==
- 2007: Gabrielle d'Estrées
- 2008:
  - Livre du Poche - Reader's choice
  - Prix de lecteurs de Corse
  - The Chronos Prize for Literature
- 2009: La Mennais

== Film adaptation ==
In 2010, a film adaptation was released, starring Kristin Scott Thomas as Julia and Mélusine Mayance as Sarah. It received generally positive reviews, holding a 73% ranking on Rotten Tomatoes.
