= List of leaders of the League of Nations =

The leaders of the League of Nations consisted of a secretary-general, deputy secretary-general and a president of the Assembly selected from member states.

== Secretaries general ==
No.	Portrait	Secretary General	Took office	Left office	Time in office	Country
1	Sir Eric Drummond	Sir Eric Drummond (1876–1951)	1 August 1920	2 July 1933	12 years, 336 days	United Kingdom
2	Joseph Avenol	Joseph Avenol (1879–1952)	3 July 1933	31 August 1940	7 years, 59 days	France
3	Seán Lester	Seán Lester (1888–1959)	31 August 1940	18 April 1946	5 years, 230 days	Ireland

== Deputy secretaries general ==
No.	Portrait	Name	Term	Country
1		Jean Monnet	1919–1923	France
2		Joseph Avenol	1923–1932	France
3		Pablo de Azcárate	1933–1936	Spain
3		Massimo Pilotti	1933–1936	Italy
4		Seán Lester	1937–1940	Ireland
5		Francis Paul Walters	1940–1946	United Kingdom

== Under secretaries general ==
Nation	Name	Term
United States	Raymond B. Fosdick	1919 (provisional)
Italy	Bernardo Attolico	1919–1920
Japan	Nitobe Inazo	1919–1926
Italy	Dionisio Anzilotti	1920–1921
Germany	Albert Dufour-Feronce	1927–1932
Italy	Giacomo Paulucci di Calboli	1927–1932
Japan	Yotaro Sugimura	1927–1933
Germany	Ernst Trendelenburg	1932–1933
United Kingdom	Francis Paul Walters	1933–1939
Soviet Union	Vladimir Sokoline	1937–1939
Argentina	Luis Podestá Costa	1938–1943
Greece	Thanassis Aghnides	1939–1942

== Presidents of the Assembly ==
Nation	Portrait	Name	Term
France		Léon Bourgeois	1920
Belgium		Paul Hymans; 1st time	1920–1921
Netherlands		Herman Adriaan van Karnebeek	1921–1922
Chile		Agustín Edwards	1922–1923
Cuba		Cosme de la Torriente y Peraza	1923–1924
Switzerland		Giuseppe Motta	1924–1925
Canada		Raoul Dandurand	1925–1926
Portugal		Afonso Costa	1926
Kingdom of Yugoslavia		Momčilo Ninčić	1926–1927
Uruguay		Alberto Guani	1927–1928
Denmark		Herluf Zahle	1928–1929
El Salvador		José Gustavo Guerrero	1929–1930
Kingdom of Romania		Nicolae Titulescu	1930–1932
Belgium		Paul Hymans; 2nd time	1932–1933
Union of South Africa		Charles Theodore Te Water	1933–1934
Sweden		Rickard Sandler	1934
Mexico		Francisco Castillo Nájera	1934–1935
Czechoslovakia		Edvard Beneš	1935–1936
Argentina		Carlos Saavedra Lamas	1936–1937
Turkey		Tevfik Rüştü Aras	1937–1937
British Raj		Sir Sultan Muhammed Shah, Aga Khan III	1937–1938
Ireland		Éamon de Valera	1938–1939
Norway		C. J. Hambro	1939–1946

== See also ==
- List of secretaries-general of the United Nations
