= Mélusine Mayance =

French actress (born 1999)

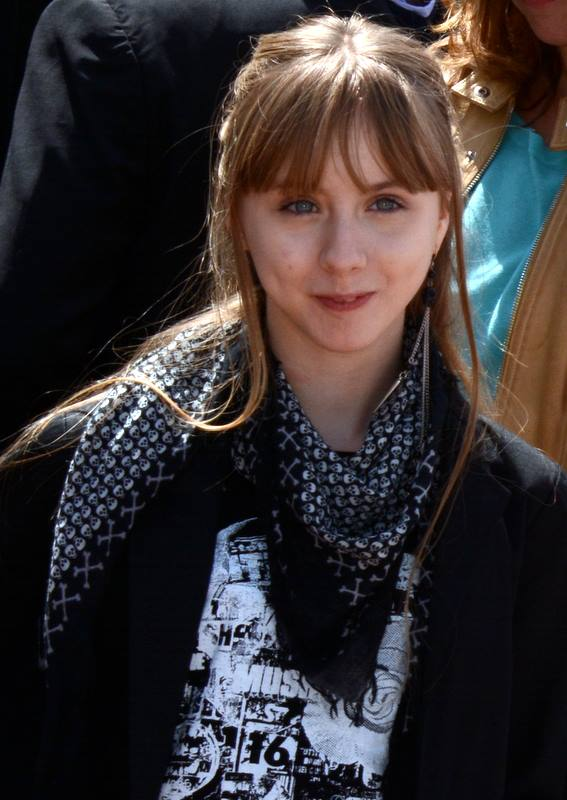
- Mélusine Mayance at the 2013 Cannes Film Festival
- Born: 21 March 1999 (age 26); Paris, France
- Occupation: Actress

Mélusine Mayance (born 21 March 1999 in Paris) is a French actress.

She is best known for her role in the 2010 French-Language film Sarah's Key, in which she portrayed the childhood version of the story's main character 'Sarah Starzynski' (whose life story is uncovered and told by Kristin Scott Thomas's character many decades after the end of the second world war). Known in French as Elle s'appelait Sarah, the historical fiction film is set in 1942 France, in the midst of the second world war. Mélusine's character is a young Jewish child whose family is rounded up and arrested in downtown Paris during the Vel' d'Hiv Roundup before being sent to Auschwitz for extermination. Mayance rose to success while starring in films such as Vive Les Vacances! and Ricky in which she plays the half-sister of an infant boy who grows a pair of wings.

== Filmography ==
- 2009 : Vive les vacances ! (TV) : Alice
- 2009 : Ricky, by François Ozon : Lisa
- 2009 : Les associés (TV) : Émilie
- 2010 : La peau de chagrin (TV), by Alain Berliner : La Mendiante
- 2010 : Elle s'appelait Sarah, by Gilles Paquet-Brenner : Sarah Starzynski
- 2010 : Un soupçon d'innocence (TV), by director Olivier Péray : Julie
- 2011 : Bouquet final (TV), by Josée Dayan : Charlotte
- 2013 : Les gamins : Mimi Zozo
- 2013 : Michael Kohlhaas : Lisbeth
- 2013 : Brotherhood of Tears : Juliette Chevalier
- 2014 : Ça va passer... Mais quand? (TV film) : Paola
- 2017 : Maximilian (TV): Jeanne de France
