= Joël de Rosnay =

French scientist (born 1937)

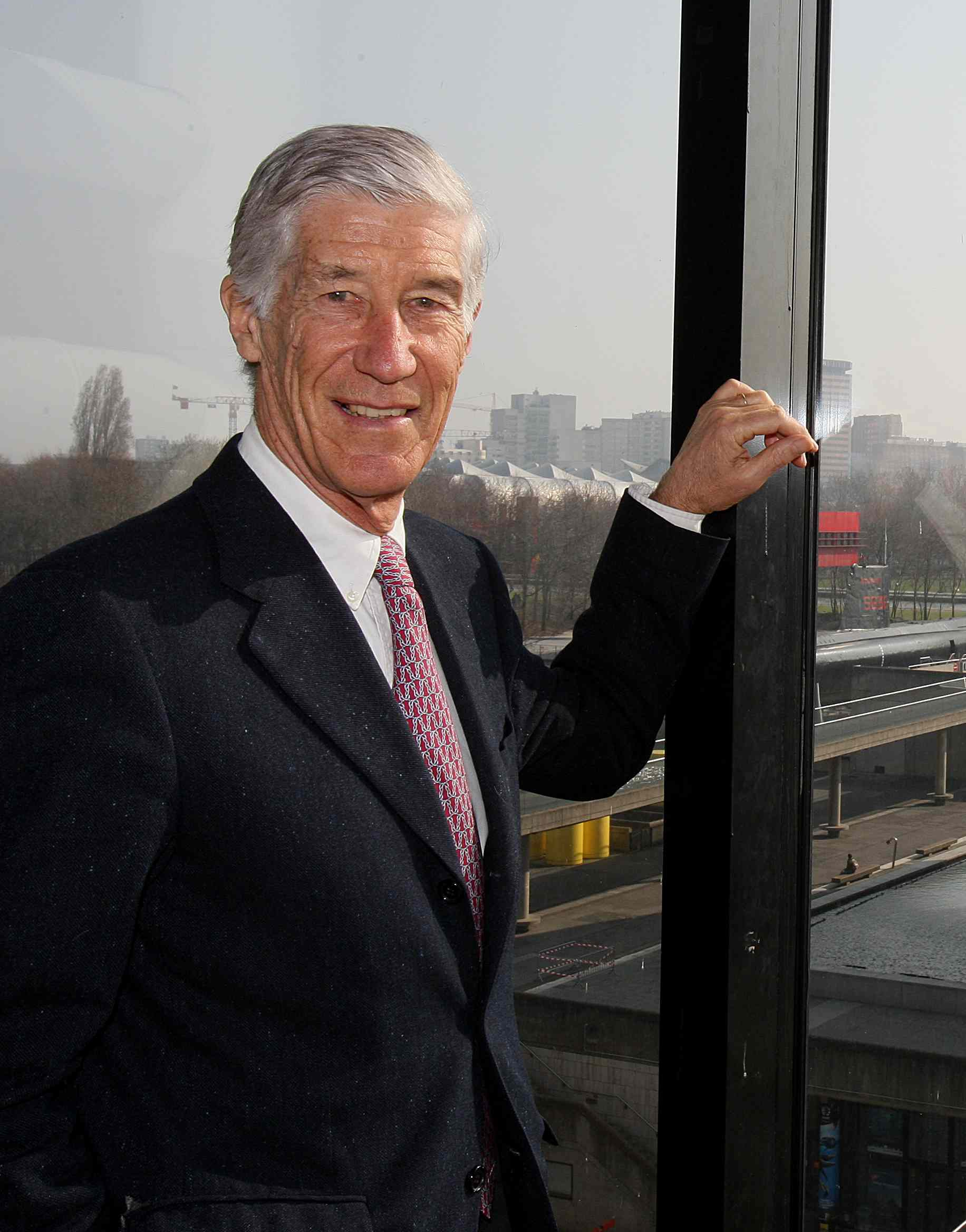
Joël de Rosnay

Joël de Rosnay (born 12 June 1937), is a Mauritius-born French scientist and writer, presently President of Biotics International, a consulting company specialized in the impact of new technologies on industries, and Special Advisor to the President of the Universcience (Cité des Sciences et de l'Industrie and Palais de la Découverte) of which he was Director of Forecasting and Assessment until June 2002.

== Biography ==
=== Family ===
Descendant of a family of planters from the island of Mauritius (Fromet de Rosnay), Joël de Rosnay was born in Curepipe, Mauritius, and has lived in Paris since 1945. He is the son of the Franco-Mauritian painter Gaëtan de Rosnay (1912-1992) and Natacha Koltchine (born in Saint Petersburg in 1914, fleeing the Russian Revolution and arriving in Biarritz, southern France in the 1920s, died in Sens in 2005), and the brother of Zina Dotézac and Arnaud de Rosnay.

Joël de Rosnay is married to Stella Jebb, daughter of Lord Gladwyn Jebb, former acting Secretary-General of the UN (1945 - 1946) and British Ambassador to Paris from 1954 to 1960. He is the father of Tatiana de Rosnay, a writer, Cécilia de Vaucleroy, a product design consultant, and Alexis de Rosnay, a former banker at Lazard Frères, Lehman Brothers and JP Morgan, now working at Barclays.

From 1975 to 1985 he was Director of Research Applications at l'Institut Pasteur (the Pasteur Institute in Paris). Former research associate at the Massachusetts Institute of Technology (MIT) in the field of biology and computer graphics, he was successively Scientific Attaché to the French Embassy in the United States, and Scientific Director of European Enterprises Development Company (a venture capital group) from 1971 to 1975.

As well as several reports, namely : Biotechnologies and Bio Industry (1979), an annex to the report Sciences de la vie et Société by Professors Gros, Jacob and Royer. He was also co-responsible for the report which led to the creation of CESTA (Centre d'Etudes des Systèmes et des Technologies Avancées / Center for the study of systems and advanced technologies, 1982).

=== As author ===
De Rosnay is particularly interested in advanced technologies and the applications of system theory; his concept of the macroscope, a "big picture" view of the globe and its residents, was published in 1975. On these subjects, he wrote :

- Le Macroscope (1975);
- Les Chemins de la Vie (The paths of life) (1983) and
- Le Cerveau Planétaire (The planetary brain) (1986).

De Rosnay wrote for several years on new technologies for the economic magazine L'Expansion. He speaks on the same subject for Europe1, a radio network. De Rosnay is the author of several scientific books aimed at a wider public, such as:

- Les origines de la vie, (The origins of life) (1966);
- La malbouffe (the wrong food) (1979);
- La Révolution Biologique, (the biological revolution) (1982);
- Branchez-vous (Plug-in!), (1984), a book on personal computers;
- L'Aventure du Vivant (The adventure of life) (1988);
- L'avenir en direct (Live from the future) (1989);
- Les rendez-vous du Futur (Rendez-vous with the future) (1991);
- L'Homme Symbiotique, regards sur le 3eme millénaire (The Symbiotic Man, a look into the third millennium) (1995);
- La plus belle histoire du monde, (The most beautiful history of the World) with Yves Coppens, Hubert Reeves and Dominique Simonnet, Seuil, 1996;
- Une vie en plus with Jean-Louis Servan-Schreiber, François de Closets and Dominique Simonnet, Seuil 2005;
- La révolte du Prolétariat with the collaboration of Carlo Revelli, Fayard, 2006.
- 2020 : Les scénarios du futur, Fayard, 2008.
- Surfer la Vie, Sur-Vivre dans la société fluide, LLL, May 2012;
- Je cherche à comprendre...les codes cachés de la nature LLL, 2016;
- La Symphonie du vivant, comment l'épigénétique va changer votre vie, LLL, 2018.

De Rosnay’s ideas have inspired various technology businesses and modern cultural works by creatives, entrepreneurs, and academics, notably around his notion of the cybiont. In The Symbiotic Man, De Rosnay defines a unit of a holistic social structure, expanding on the concept of the singular living holobiont to also include the totality of human-made machines. He terms this set the cybiont - an emerging “planetary macro-organism” of biological and synthetic entities, all operating in synchrony as a cybernetic system.

== Personal life ==
De Rosnay's wife Stella is the daughter of Gladwyn Jebb, 1st Baron Gladwyn. His daughter is novelist Tatiana de Rosnay.

De Rosnay is famous for pioneering surfing in France in 1957 and created the Surf Club de France in 1964.
