= Serge Joncour =

French novelist and screenwriter (born 1961)

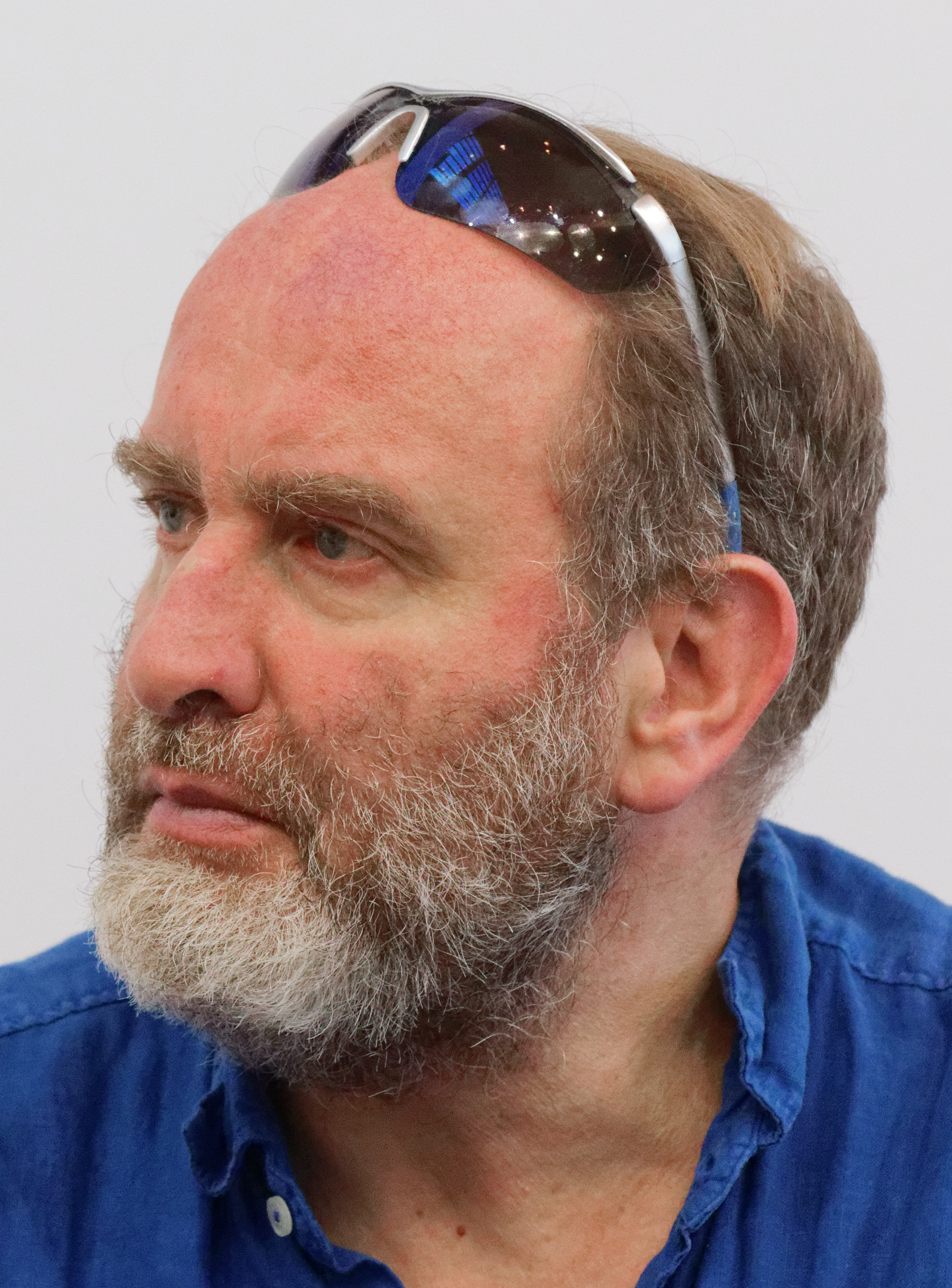
Serge Joncour in 2017

Serge Joncour (French: [sɛʁʒ ʒɔ̃kuʁ]; born 1961) is a French novelist and screenwriter. He was born in Paris and studied philosophy at university. His debut novel UV was published in 1998. Notable books include:

- L'Écrivain national, which won the Prix des Deux Magots
- Repose-toi sur moi winner of the Prix Interallié
- Chien loup, winner of the Prix Landerneau des Lecteurs, which became the first of his novels to appear in English translation.
- Nature humaine, winner of Prix Femina 2020.

As a screenwriter, he wrote the script for Elle s'appelait Sarah (2011) starring Kristin Scott Thomas.

He was recently suspended from Twitter.
