= Tatiana de Rosnay =

French-British author

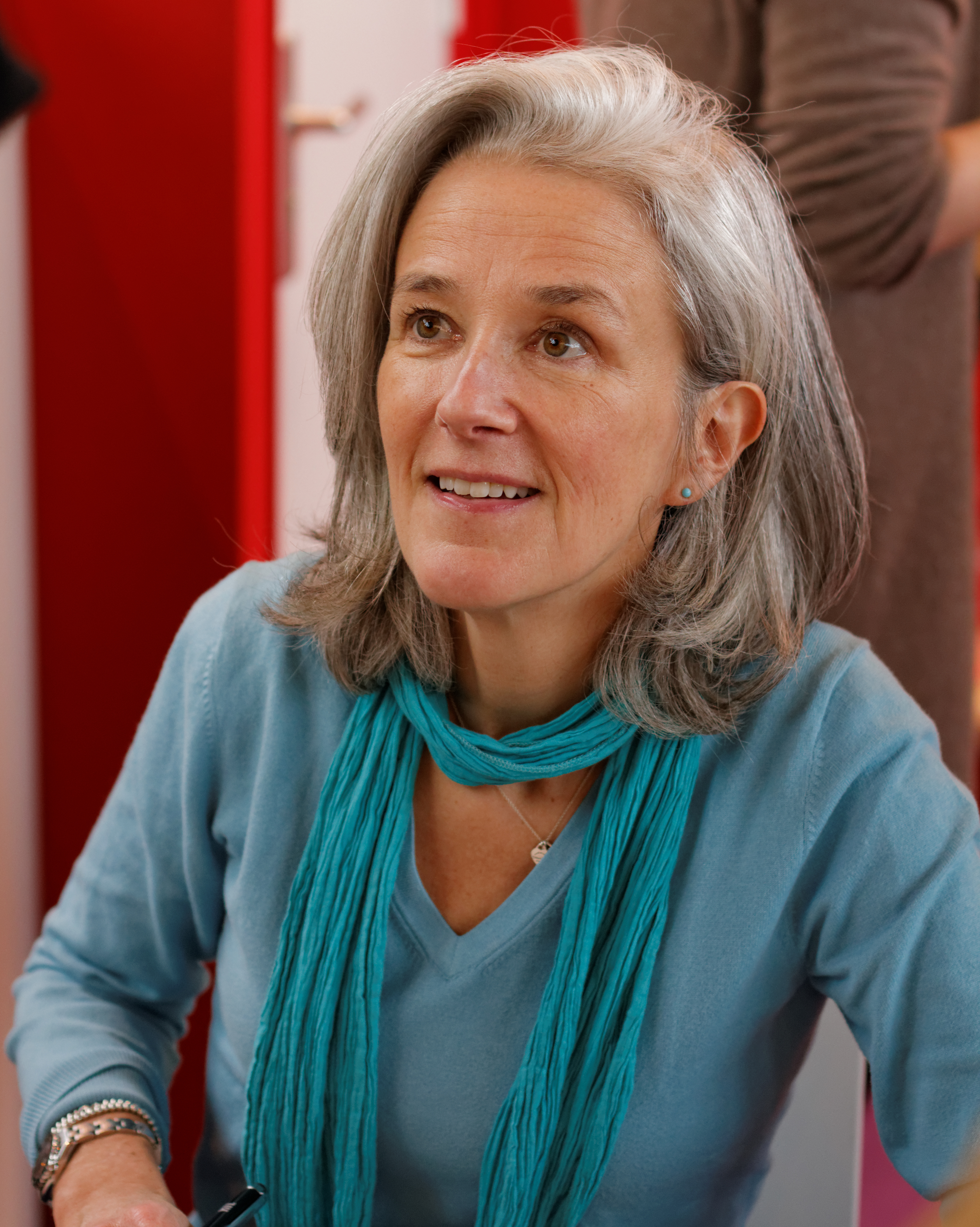
- Tatiana de Rosnay in 2013
- Born: 28 September 1961 (age 65); Neuilly-sur-Seine, France
- Occupation: Writer
- Spouse: Nicolas Jolly
- Children: 2
- Father: Joël de Rosnay
- Relatives: Gaëtan de Rosnay (grandfather); Gladwyn Jebb (grandfather); Cynthia Jebb (grandmother)

Tatiana de Rosnay (born 28 September 1961) is a French-British writer.

== Life and career ==
Tatiana de Rosnay was born on 28 September 1961 in the suburbs of Paris. She is of English, French and Russian descent. Her father is French scientist Joël de Rosnay, her grandfather was painter Gaëtan de Rosnay and they were born in Mauritius. Rosnay's paternal great-grandmother was Russian actress Natalia Rachewskïa, director of the Leningrad Pushkin Theatre from 1925 to 1949.

Rosnay's mother, Stella Jebb, is English, daughter of diplomat and former Secretary-General of the United Nations, Gladwyn Jebb, and great-great-granddaughter of Isambard Kingdom Brunel, the British engineer. Rosnay is also the niece of historian Hugh Thomas. Rosnay was raised in Paris and then in Boston, when her father taught at MIT in the 1970s. She moved to England in the early 1980s and obtained a bachelor's degree in English literature at the University of East Anglia, in Norwich. On her return to Paris in 1984, she was a press officer, then became a journalist and literary critic for the magazine Psychologies.

Since 1992, Rosnay has published more than twenty volumes of fiction in French and English. She has also worked on the series Family Affairs for which she has written two episodes with the screenwriter Pierre-Yves Lebert. This series was broadcast on TF1 during the summer of 2000.

In 2007, Rosnay published her most popular novel, Sarah's Key. According to her French publisher, it had sold 758,000 copies worldwide by November 2008 and had passed two million copies worldwide by late 2010, reaching this milestone even before the film version was released. Rosnay's U.S. publisher suggests that the global total had reached four million copies by the northern summer of 2011, and eleven million copies by 2020.

The film version — Elle s'appelait Sarah, or Sarah's Key in anglophone markets — was directed by Gilles Paquet-Brenner, with a screenplay by Paquet-Brenner and Serge Joncour, and with Kristin Scott Thomas as Julia. It opened in France on 13 October 2010 and in the United States, where the book enjoyed great success, on 22 July 2011.

Rosnay has twice appeared in the annual list of the ten top-selling French authors produced by market researcher GfK for the French daily Le Figaro, ranking fifth in 2010 and sixth in 2011.

== Published works ==
=== Fiction ===
==== Composed in French ====
- L'Appartement témoin, Fayard, 1992
- Mariés, pères de famille, short stories, Plon, 1995
- Le Dîner des ex, Plon, 1996 — reissued in pocket format as Partition amoureuse
- Le Cœur d'une autre, Plon, 1998
- Le Voisin, Plon, 2000
- La Mémoire des Murs, Plon, 2003
- Spirales, Plon, 2004
- Moka, Plon, 2005
- Amsterdamnation et autres nouvelles, short stories, Plon, 2013
- Café Lowendal et autres nouvelles, short stories, Le Livre de Poche, 2014
- Son carnet rouge, short stories, Héloïse d'Ormesson, 2014
  - A Paris Affair: Stories, St. Martin's Press, 2015, translated into English by Sam Taylor
- Les Fleurs de l'ombre, Robert Laffont and Héloïse d'Ormesson, 2020
  - Flowers of Darkness, St. Martin's Press, 2021
- L'Envers du décor et autres nouvelles, short stories, Pocket, 2020
- Célestine du Bac, Robert Laffont and Héloïse d'Ormesson, 2021
- Nous irons mieux demain, Robert Laffont, 2022
- Leurs petites vies et autres nouvelles, short stories, Le Livre de Poche, 2024
- Poussière blonde, Albin Michel, 2024
  - Blonde Dust, Grand Central, 2025, forthcoming

==== Composed in English ====
Rosnay has written five novels in English, entrusting their translation into French to others. In each case the French translation appeared before the English original.

- Sarah's Key, St. Martin's Press, 2007
  - Elle s'appelait Sarah, Héloïse d'Ormesson, 2007, translated into French by Agnès Michaux — a preview edition was published by the book club France Loisirs in September 2006, with the retail edition from Héloïse d'Ormesson following in March 2007
- A Secret Kept, St. Martin's Press, 2010
  - Boomerang, Héloïse d'Ormesson, 2009, translated into French by Agnès Michaux
- The House I Loved, St. Martin's Press, 2012
  - Rose, Héloïse d'Ormesson, 2011, translated into French by Raymond Clarinard — the main theme of this novel is Baron Haussmann's renovation of Paris and the consequences for the inhabitants of the areas to be reconstructed
- The Other Story, St. Martin's Press, 2014
  - À l’encre russe, Héloïse d'Ormesson, 2013, translated into French by Raymond Clarinard
- The Rain Watcher, St. Martin's Press, 2018
  - Sentinelle de la pluie, Héloïse d'Ormesson, 2018, translated into French by Anouk Neuhoff

=== Nonfiction ===
- Manderley for ever, Albin Michel and Héloïse d'Ormesson, 2015
  - Manderley Forever: A Biography of Daphne du Maurier, St. Martin's Press, 2017, translated into English by Sam Taylor
- Tamara par Tatiana, sur les traces de Tamara de Lempicka, Michel Lafon, 2018
