= Frank Walters (diplomat) =

British diplomat (1888–1976)

Deputy Secretary-General of the League of Nations
- In office 1 June 1939 – 29 May 1940
- Succeeded by: Position abolished

Personal details
- Born: Francis Paul Walters; 8 June 1888 Castletown, Isle of Man
- Died: 1976 (aged 87–88) Paris, France

Francis Paul Walters (1888–1976) was a British diplomat.

He was born on the Isle of Man in 1888. During the 1920s and 1930s he was a member of the League of Nations Secretariat and the Deputy Secretary-General from 1 June 1939 to 29 May 1940.

In 1952, he authored A History of the League of Nations.

Walter's daughter, Anne-Marie Walters was a member of the United Kingdom's clandestine Special Operations Executive organization during World War II.

Francis Paul Walters died in Paris in 1976.
