= Pablo de Azcárate =

Spanish diplomat (1890–1971)

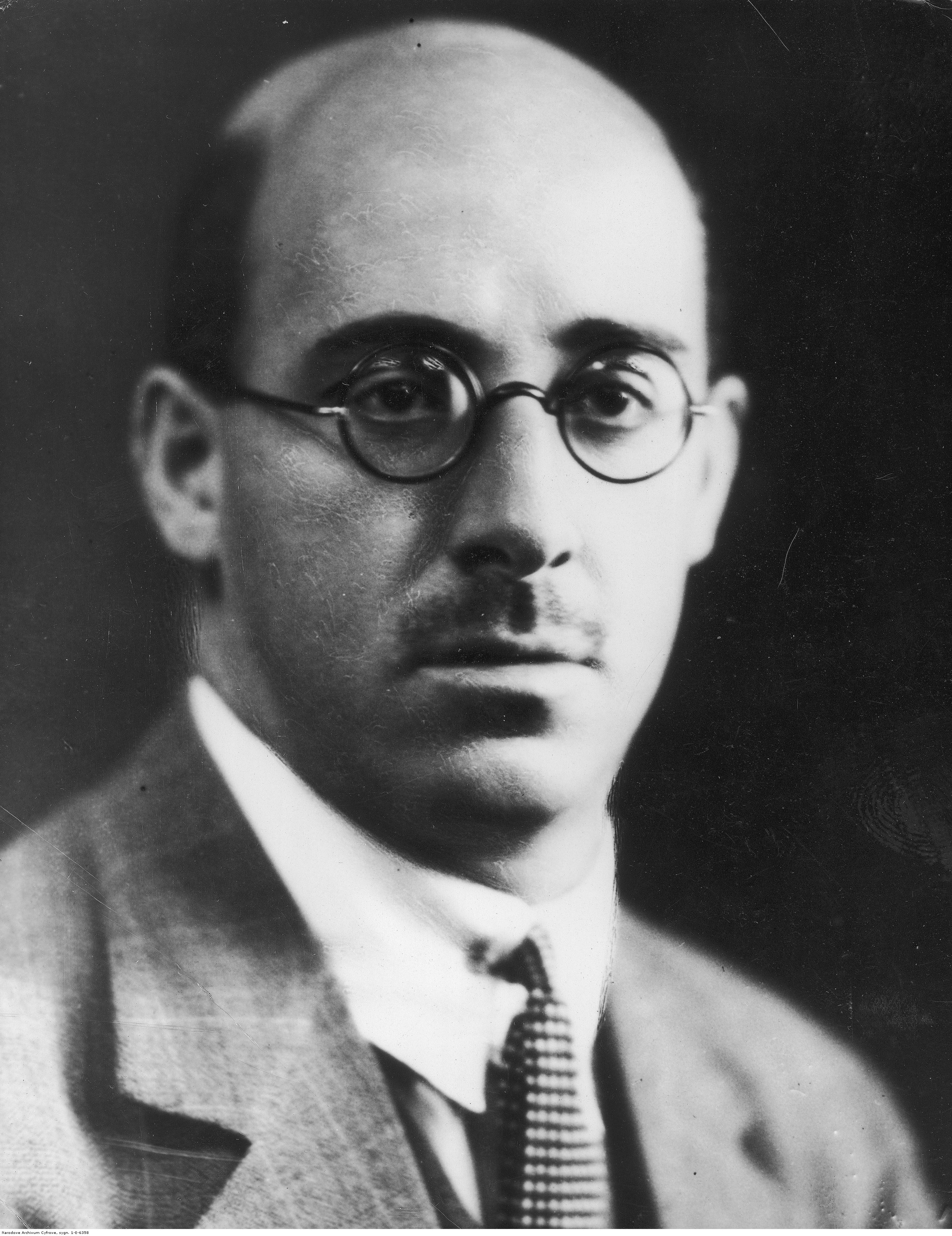
Azcárate in 1925

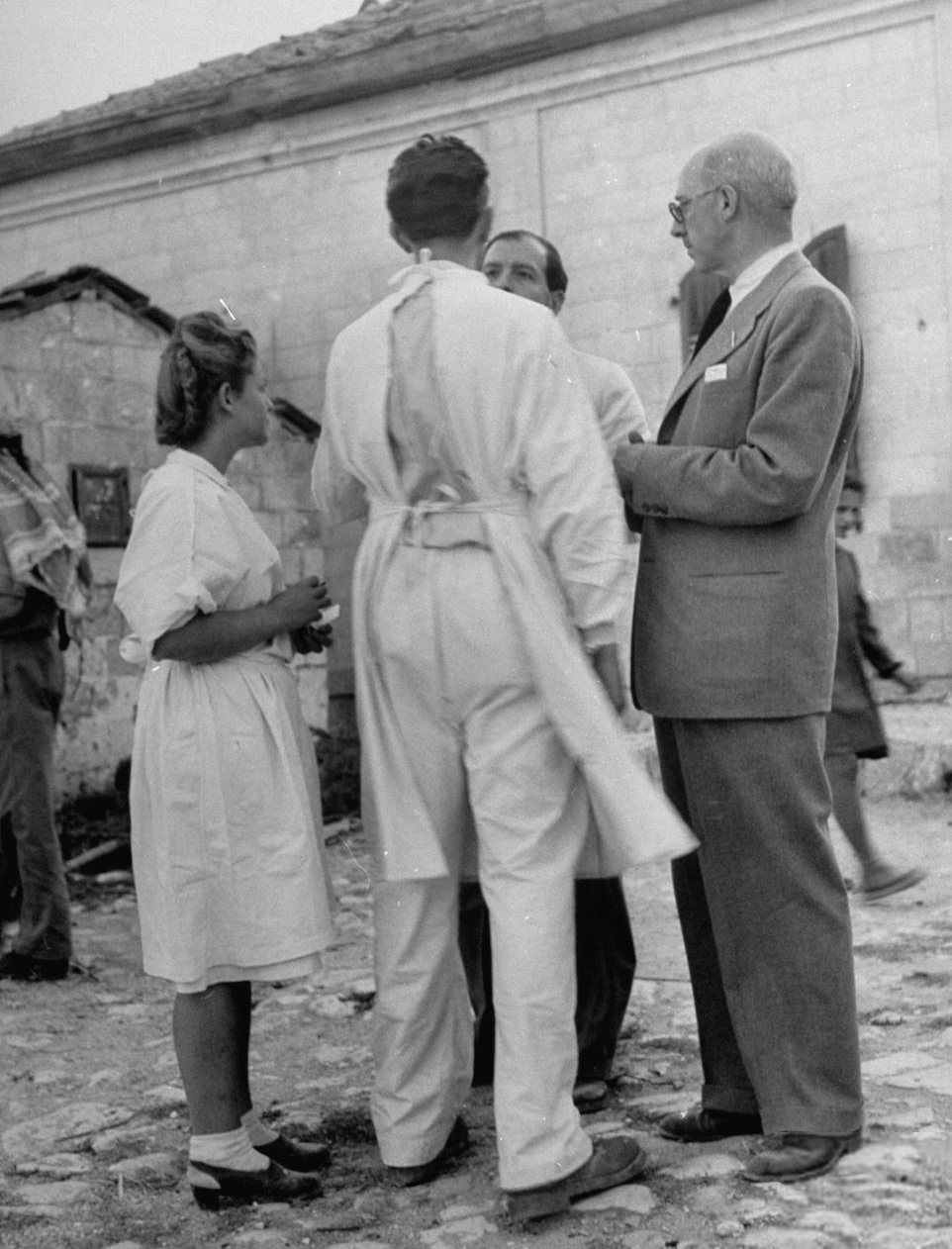
Pablo de Azcárate (R) of the United Nations Truce Commission, talking to Dr. Egon Riss Israel (with his back to the camera) who volunteered to join as a POW so he could continue treating the Israeli wounded POWs being taken to Jordan, Mr. Mosa el Husaini (the nephew of the Mofti Haj Amin al-Husseini, he was not an MD) and an Israeli nurse (Masha), in Jerusalem, 1 June 1948.

Pablo de Azcárate y Flórez (1890–1971) was a Spanish diplomat. He was born in Madrid. During the 1920s he worked in Minorities Section of the League of Nations Secretariat. During the Spanish Civil War, Azcárate served as Ambassador of the Spanish Republican government to London. Following the British recognition of the Nationalist government in early 1939, he went into exile in Switzerland. From 1946 onward, he was attached to the UN. In 1948-1952 he served as secretary of the Consular Truce Commission in Jerusalem on behalf of the UN. Azcárate died in Geneva in 1971.

Azcárate's son, Manuel Azcárate (1916–1998), became one of the leaders of the Spanish Communist Party.

== Works ==
- League of Nations and National Minorities: An Experiment (Carnegie Endowment for International Peace, Washington D.C. 1945)
- Azcarate, Pablo de, Mission in Palestine, 1948-1952 (Washington, DC: Middle East Institute, 1966)
- Ramos Tolosa, Jorge, La Comisión de Palestina de 1948: la misión imposible de Pablo de Azcárate (Ayer, nº 93, 2014, págs. 189–213. ISSN 1134-2277, https://www.revistasmarcialpons.es/revistaayer/article/view/La-comision-de-palestina-de-1948/1788)
