= Opposition to World War I =

- Part of World War I and the anti-war movement
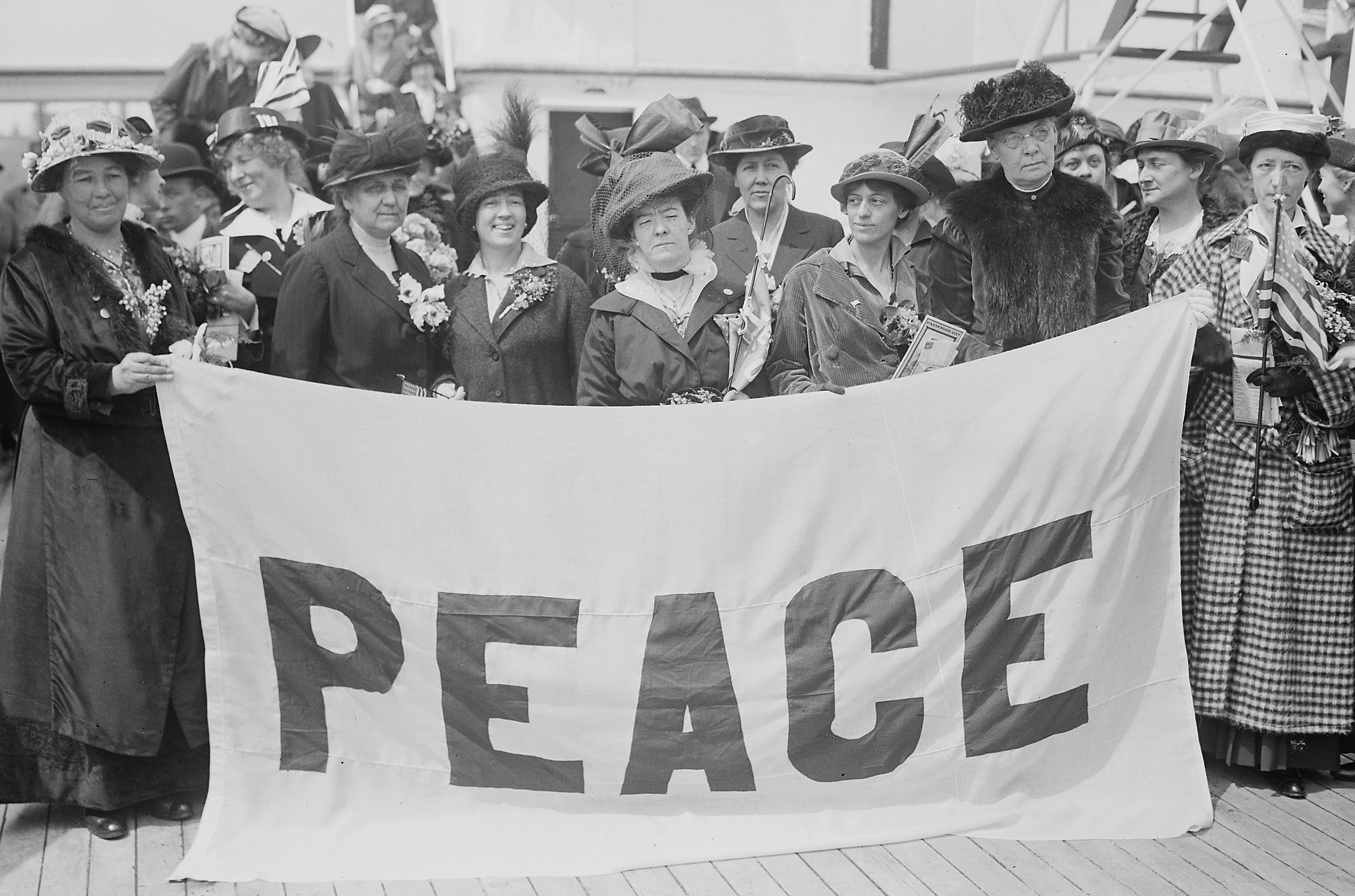
- Protests against World War I at the 1918 Women's Peace Conference in The Hague
- Date: 1914–1918
- Location: Allied and Central Powers
- Caused by: World War I
- Goals: End of any participation in World War I
- Methods: Opposition
- Result: Various mutinies; Revolutions of 1917–1923

Opposition to World War I was widespread during the conflict and included socialists, such as anarchists, syndicalists, and Marxists, as well as Christian pacifists, anti-colonial nationalists, feminists, intellectuals, and the working class. The socialist movement had declared before the war their opposition to a war which they said could only mean workers killing each other in the interests of their bosses.

Once the war was declared, most socialists and trade unions decided to back the government of their country and support the war. For example, on 25 July 1914, the executive of the Social Democratic Party of Germany (SPD) issued an appeal to its membership to demonstrate against the coming war, only to vote on 4 August for the war credits the German government wanted. Likewise, the French Socialist Party and its union, the CGT, especially after the assassination of the pacificist Jean Jaurès, organized mass rallies and protests until the outbreak of war, but once the war began they argued that in wartime socialists should support their nations against the aggression of other nations and also voted for war credits.

Groups opposed to the war included the Russian Bolsheviks, the Socialist Party of America, the Italian Socialist Party, and the socialist faction led by Karl Liebknecht and Rosa Luxemburg in Germany (later to become the Communist Party of Germany). In Sweden, the socialist youth leader Zeth Höglund was jailed for his anti-war propaganda, even though Sweden did not participate in the war.

== Women ==
Women across the spectrum were much less supportive of the war than men. Women in church groups were especially anti-war; however, women in the suffrage movement in different countries wanted to support the war effort, asking for the vote as a reward for that support. In France, women activists from both the working-class socialist women's and the middle-class suffrage movements formed their own groups to oppose the war. They were unable to coordinate their efforts because of mutual suspicion due to class and political differences. After 1915, the groups weakened and dissolved entirely as their leading militants left to work within nonfeminist organizations opposing the war.

The women's suffrage movement in Britain split on the war issue. The main official groups supported the war but it was opposed by a number of prominent women's rights campaigners, including Helena Swanwick, Margaret Ashton, Catherine Marshall, Maude Royden, Kathleen Courtney, Chrystal Macmillan, and Sylvia Pankhurst. It was an early coalition of women's campaigning with pacifism that led to the formation of Women's International League for Peace and Freedom in 1915.

== Pacifists ==
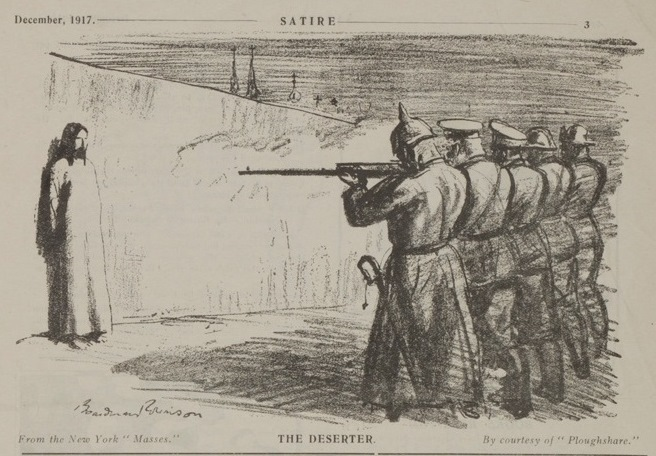
The Deserter (1916) by Boardman Robinson

Although the onset of the First World War was generally greeted with enthusiastic patriotism across Europe, peace groups were still active in protesting the starting of the war.

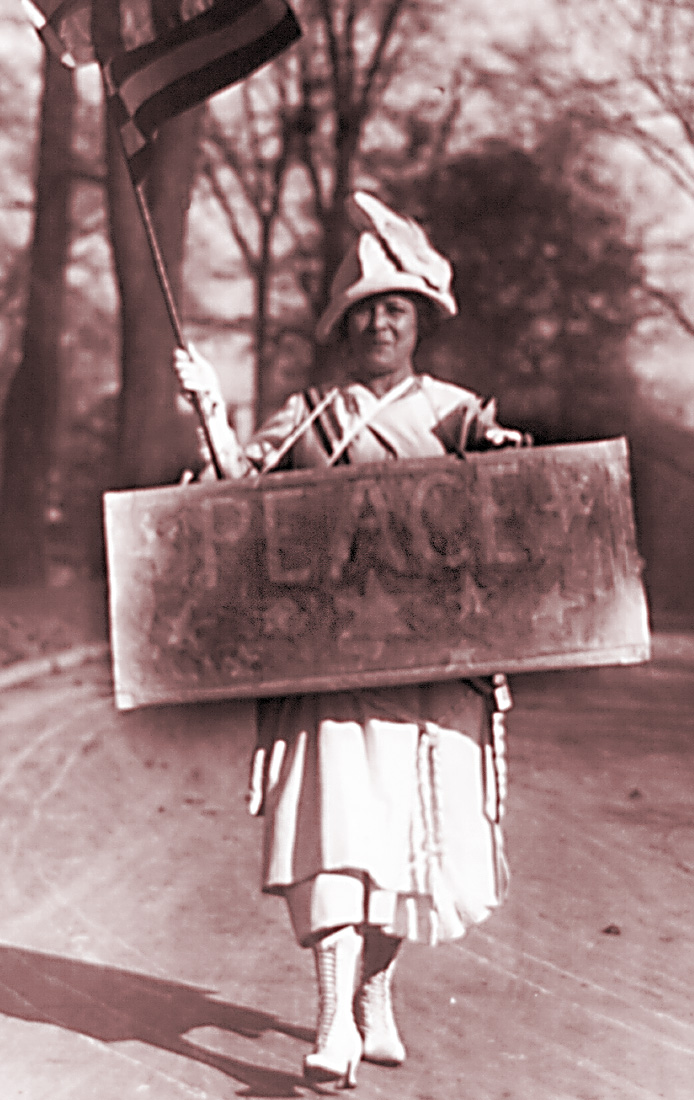
A World War I-era female peace protester

In 1915, the League of Nations Society was formed by British Liberal Party leaders to promote a strong international organization that could enforce the peaceful resolution of conflict. Later that year the League to Enforce Peace was established in America to promote similar goals. Hamilton Holt published an editorial in his New York City weekly magazine The Independent called "The Way to Disarm: A Practical Proposal" on 28 September 1914. It called for an international organization to agree upon the arbitration of disputes and to guarantee the territorial integrity of its members by maintaining military forces sufficient to defeat those of any non-member. The ensuing debate among prominent internationalists modified Holt's plan to align it more closely with proposals offered in Great Britain by Viscount James Bryce, a former ambassador from Britain to the U.S. These and other initiatives were pivotal in the change in attitudes that gave birth to the League of Nations after the war. Christian pacifists and the traditional peace churches such as the Religious Society of Friends (Quakers) opposed the war. Most American Pentecostal denominations were critical to the war and encouraged their members to be conscientious objectors.

In the United States, some of the many groups that protested against the war were the Woman's Peace Party (which was organized in 1915 and led by noted reformer Jane Addams), the American Union Against Militarism, the Fellowship of Reconciliation, and the American Friends Service Committee. Jeannette Rankin, the first woman elected to Congress, was another fierce advocate of pacifism, the only person to vote no to America's entrance into both World Wars.

== Catholic Church ==
Pope Benedict XV, elected to the papacy less than three months into WW1, made the war and its consequences the main focus of his early pontificate. In stark contrast to his predecessor, Pope Pius X, five days after his election he spoke of his determination to do what he could to bring peace. His first encyclical, Ad beatissimi Apostolorum, given 1 November 1914, was concerned with this subject. Benedict XV found his abilities and unique position as a religious emissary of peace ignored by the belligerent powers. The 1915 Treaty of London between Italy and the Triple Entente included secret provisions whereby the Allies agreed with Italy to ignore papal peace moves towards the Central Powers. Consequently, the publication of Benedict's proposed seven-point Peace Note of August 1917 was roundly ignored by all parties except Austria-Hungary.

== International socialists ==
Many socialist groups and movements were antimilitarist, arguing that war by its nature was a type of governmental coercion of the working class for the benefit of capitalist elites. However, the national parties in the Second International increasingly supported their respective nations in war and the International was dissolved in 1916.

=== Before 1914 ===
When the Second International, the primary international socialist organization before World War I, was founded in 1889, internationalism was one of its central tenets. "The workers have no Fatherland", Karl Marx and Friedrich Engels had declared in The Communist Manifesto. Between 1889 and 1914 the Second International repeatedly declared its opposition to war and that "[the working class shall] do all they can to prevent the outbreak of war"

The exact means of combating the outbreak of war was a matter of conflict within the Second International. On the far-left the radical French pacifist Gustave Hervé promoted building anti-government militias and instigating mutinies in the army. The center of the party, embodied by the German August Bebel and the French Jean Jaurès, were more circumspect with their preferred means. Jaurès particularly warned of the potential for a diversionary war.

Alarmed by the growth of the socialist movement, a government might attempt to create a foreign diversion rather than directly battle Social Democracy. If a war breaks out in this way between France and Germany, would we permit the French and German proletariat to murder one another on behalf of the capitalists and for their benefit without Social Democracy attempting to exert the greatest effort to stop it? If we were not to make the attempt, we would all be dishonored.

These statements were in tension with others. For example, Bebel was determined "never to abandon a single piece of German soil to the foreigner". Jaurès criticized Marx and Engels' maxim that the "workers have no Fatherland" as "vain and obscure subtleties" and a "sarcastic negation of history itself".

=== Germany ===
After the repeal of the anti-socialist law in 1890 the SPD steadily gained support in the lower house of the Imperial German Parliament, the Reichstag. By 1914 it was the largest party in the Reichstag. Prior to 1914, the SPD had consistently voted against all imperial military spending under the slogan "Not one man, not one farthing for the current system."

Map of Reichstag Delegates 1912-1919

During the July Crisis, it became clear that German mobilization, and therefor German war credit would be critical. A vote on war credits in the Reichstag was scheduled for 4 August, and required a simple majority to pass. This meant that a vote against war credits would only be symbolic for the SPD, unless a non-socialist party defected to their side.

On 2 August, the right faction of the German SPD met and agreed to support the upcoming war credits vote. On 3 August, the full SPD parliamentary delegation met. In the party's preparatory meeting on 3 August, there were, according to SPD representative Wolfgang Heine, "vile, noisy scenes" because of conflict between the right faction and Karl Liebknecht who believed that "the rejection of war loans was self-evident and unquestionable for the majority of the SPD Reichstag faction." In the end, the right faction successfully swayed the center of the party. On 4 August, the Reichstag, voted on war credits. Following a tradition of party discipline, the socialist delegates unanimously voted for the measures. The policy of supporting the government's war efforts became known as the Burgfrieden or civil truce.

=== France ===
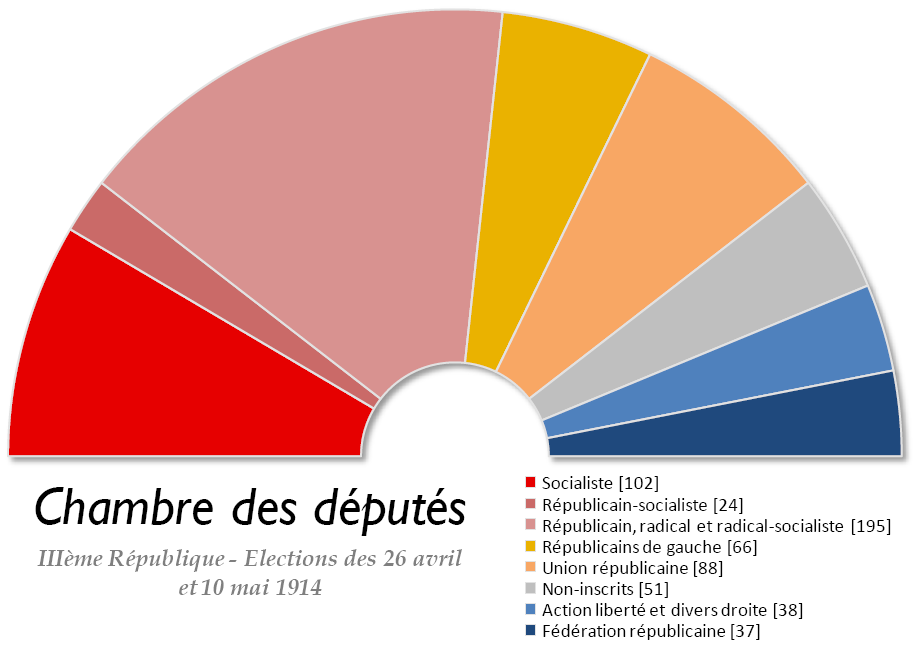
Composition of the French Chamber of Deputies 1914-1919

The socialist parties of France had split and reunited several times since the founding of the republic. At the outbreak of the July Crisis the French Section of the Worker's International (SFIO) was the most prominently anti-war party in France. Its leader, Jean Jaurès, was actively searching for allies against a European war. To this end, a special congress of the Second International was planned for 9 August in Paris. On 4 August, socialists also rallied behind the war in France, where socialist acquiescence became known as the union sacrée.

=== Great Britain ===
In Britain, the prominent peace activist Stephen Henry Hobhouse went to prison for refusing military service, citing his convictions as an "International Socialist and, a Christian" On 5 August, the Parliamentary Labour Party in the United Kingdom voted to support the government in the war.

=== Collapse of international resistance ===
After the largest socialist parties of the Second International had voted in favor of war funding and shifted to support their national governments, organized international resistance by the socialist parties disintegrated. Reaction to these events would lead to the Zimmerwald Conference, and the splitting of socialist and communist movements.

== Austria-Hungary ==
Like all the armies of mainland Europe, Austria-Hungary relied on conscription to fill its ranks. Officer recruitment, however, was voluntary. The effect of this at the start of the war was that well over a quarter of the rank and file were Slavs, while more than 75% of the officers were ethnic Germans. This was much resented. The army has been described as being "run on colonial lines" and the Slav soldiers as "disaffected". Thus conscription contributed greatly to Austria's disastrous performance on the battlefield.

== British Empire ==
=== Great Britain ===
In 1914, the Public Schools Officers' Training Corps annual camp was held at Tidworth Pennings, near Salisbury Plain. Head of the British Army, Lord Kitchener, was to review the cadets, but the imminence of the war prevented him. General Horace Smith-Dorrien was sent instead. He surprised the two-or-three thousand cadets by declaring (in the words of Donald Christopher Smith, a Bermudian cadet who was present):

that war should be avoided at almost any cost, that war would solve nothing, that the whole of Europe and more besides would be reduced to ruin, and that the loss of life would be so large that whole populations would be decimated. In their ignorance I, and many of the Britons, felt almost ashamed of a British General who uttered such depressing and unpatriotic sentiments, but during the next four years, those of us who survived the holocaust—probably not more than one-quarter of us—learned how right the General's prognosis was and how courageous he had been to utter it.

In Britain, some people resisted conscription. By 1918 several distinguished people were imprisoned for their opposition to it, including "the nation's leading investigative journalist, a future winner of the Nobel Prize, more than half a dozen future members of Parliament, one future cabinet minister, and a former newspaper editor who was publishing a clandestine journal for his fellow inmates." One of them was Bertrand Russell - a mathematician, philosopher and social critic engaged in pacifist activities, who was dismissed from Trinity College, Cambridge, following his conviction under the Defence of the Realm Act in 1916. A later conviction resulted in six months' of imprisonment in Brixton Prison from which he was released in September 1918.

Despite the mainstream Labour Party's support for the war effort, the Independent Labour Party was instrumental in opposing conscription through organizations such as the Non-Conscription Fellowship, while a Labour Party affiliate, the British Socialist Party, organized a number of unofficial strikes. Arthur Henderson resigned from the Cabinet in 1917 amid calls for party unity to be replaced by George Barnes. Overall, the majority of the movement continued to support the war for the duration of the conflict, and the British Labour Party, unlike most of its equivalents on the Continent, did not split over the war.

In the shipyards in and around Glasgow, Scotland, opposition to the war effort became a major aim during the Red Clydeside era. To mobilize the workers of Clydeside against World War I, the Clyde Workers' Committee (CWC) was formed, with Willie Gallacher as its head and David Kirkwood its treasurer. The CWC led the campaign against the coalition government in which David Lloyd George was a prominent member, and their Munitions Act, which forbade engineers from leaving the company they were employed in. The CWC negotiated with government leaders, but no agreement could be reached and consequently both Gallacher and Kirkwood were arrested and imprisoned under the Defence of the Realm Act. Anti-war activity also took place outside the workplace and on the streets in general. The Marxist John Maclean and Independent Labour Party member James Maxton were both jailed for their anti-war propagandizing.

=== Australia ===
In Australia two referendums in 1916 and 1917 resulted in votes against conscription, and were seen as opposition to an all-out prosecution of the war. In retaliation, the Australian government used the War Precautions Act and the Unlawful Associations Act to arrest and prosecute anti-conscriptionists such as Tom Barker, editor of Direct Action and many other members of the Industrial Workers of the World. The young John Curtin, at the time a member of the Victorian Socialist Party, was also arrested. Anti-conscriptionist publications were seized by government censors in police raids.

Other notable opponents to Conscription included the Catholic Archbishop of Melbourne Daniel Mannix, the Queensland Labor Premier Thomas Ryan, Vida Goldstein and the Women's Peace Army. Most labor unions actively opposed conscription. Many Australians thought positively of conscription as a sign of loyalty to Britain and thought that it would also support those men who were already fighting. However, trade unions feared that their members might be replaced by cheaper foreign or female labour and opposed conscription. Some groups argued that the whole war was immoral, and it was unjust to force people to fight. In Australia, women had full rights to vote which was then rare.

=== Canada ===
In Canada, opposition to conscription and involvement in the war centered on French Canadian nationalists led by Henri Bourassa. Following the 1917 elections, the government implemented the Military Service Act 1917 that came into effect in 1918, which sparked a weekend of rioting in Quebec City between 28 March and 1 April 1918. Invoking the War Measures Act of 1914, the federal government sent troops to restore order in the city, which opened fire on a demonstration on 1 April.

=== Ireland ===
Although large numbers of Irishmen had willingly joined Irish regiments and divisions of the New Army at the outbreak of war in 1914, the likelihood of enforced conscription created a backlash. This reaction was based particularly on the fact that, in a "dual policy", Lloyd George controversially linked implementation of the Government of Ireland Act 1914 or a new Home Rule Bill (as previously recommended in March by the Irish Convention) with enactment of the Military Service Bill. This had the effect of alienating both nationalists and unionists in Ireland.

The linking of conscription and Home Rule outraged the Irish nationalist parties at Westminster, including the IPP, All-for-Ireland League and others, who walked out in protest and returned to Ireland to organise opposition. Despite opposition from the entire Irish Parliamentary Party (IPP), conscription for Ireland was voted through at Westminster, becoming part of the 'Military Service (No. 2) Act, 1918' (8 Geo. 5, c. 5).

=== New Zealand ===
In New Zealand, the war (particularly conscription) was opposed by the New Zealand Socialist Party and its successor the New Zealand Labour Party. Several members were prosecuted for sedition in 1916 and imprisoned, including Peter Fraser, Bob Semple and Paddy Webb. Fraser was later Prime Minister of New Zealand for most of World War II.

== France ==
The 1917 French Army mutinies took place amongst French Army troops on the Western Front in northern France during World War I. They started just after the unsuccessful and costly Second Battle of the Aisne, the main action in the Nivelle Offensive in April 1917. The new French commander of the armies in France, General Robert Nivelle, had promised a decisive victory over the Germans in 48 hours; morale in French armies rose to a great height and the shock of failure soured their mood overnight.

== Russia ==
In Russia, opposition to the war was originally led by both Marxists and pacifist Tolstoyans under the leadership of Valentin Bulgakov. Bulgakov's first reaction to the outbreak of war was the appeal "Wake up, all people are brothers!" which he composed on 28 September 1914.

"Our enemies are - not the Germans, and - not Russians or Frenchmen. The common enemy of us all, no matter what nationality to which we belong - is the beast within us. Nowhere is this truth so clearly confirmed, as now, when, intoxicated, and excessively proud of their false science, their foreign culture and their civilization of the machine, people of the 20th century have suddenly realized the true stage of its development: this step is no higher than that which our ancestors were at in the days of Attila and Genghis Khan. It is infinitely sad to know that two thousand years of Christianity have passed almost without a trace upon the people.".

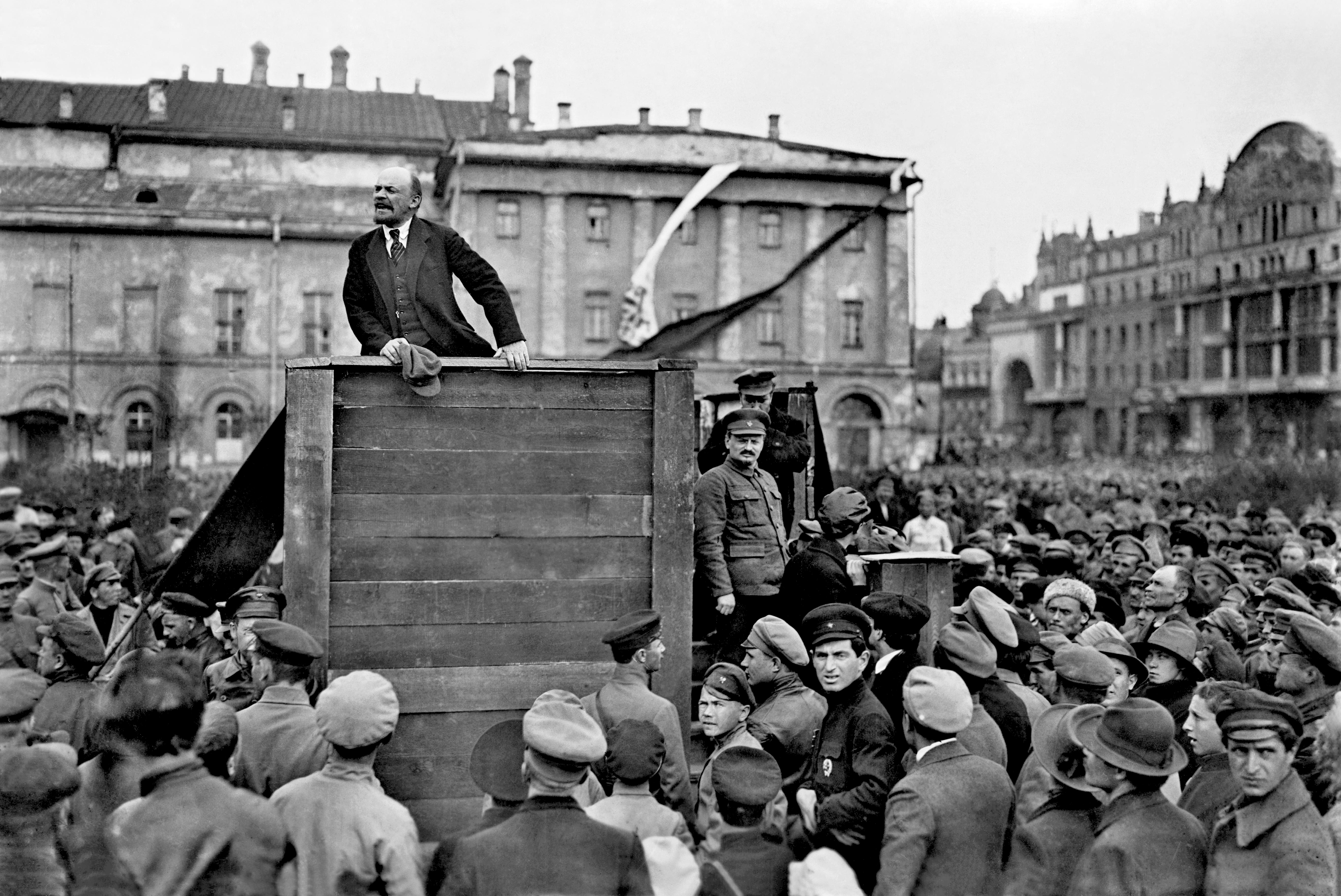
Bolshevik leaders Lenin and Trotsky promised "Peace, Land and Bread" to the impoverished masses

In October, Bulgakov continued circulating the appeal, collecting signatures and posting copies which were confiscated by the Tsarist secret police, or Okhrana. On 28 October, Bulgakov was arrested together with 27 signatories of the appeal. In November and December 1915, most defendants were released from custody on bail. A trial took place on 1 April 1916 and the defendants were acquitted. As Russia's involvement in the war continued anyway, soldiers began to establish their own revolutionary tribunals and began to execute officers en masse. After the October Revolution of 1917, Lenin's Bolsheviks called for unilateral armistice, but the other combatants refused, determined to fight until the bitter end. The Bolsheviks agreed a peace treaty with Imperial Germany, the Treaty of Brest-Litovsk, despite its harsh conditions. They also published the secret treaties between Russia and the Western Allies, hoping that the revelation of Allied plans for a vengeful peace would encourage international opposition to the war.

=== Russian forces outside Russia ===
In September 1917, Russian soldiers in France began questioning why they were fighting for the French at all and mutinied.

=== Central Asia ===
The Central Asian revolt started in the summer of 1916, when the Russian Empire government ended its exemption of Muslims from military service.

== United States ==
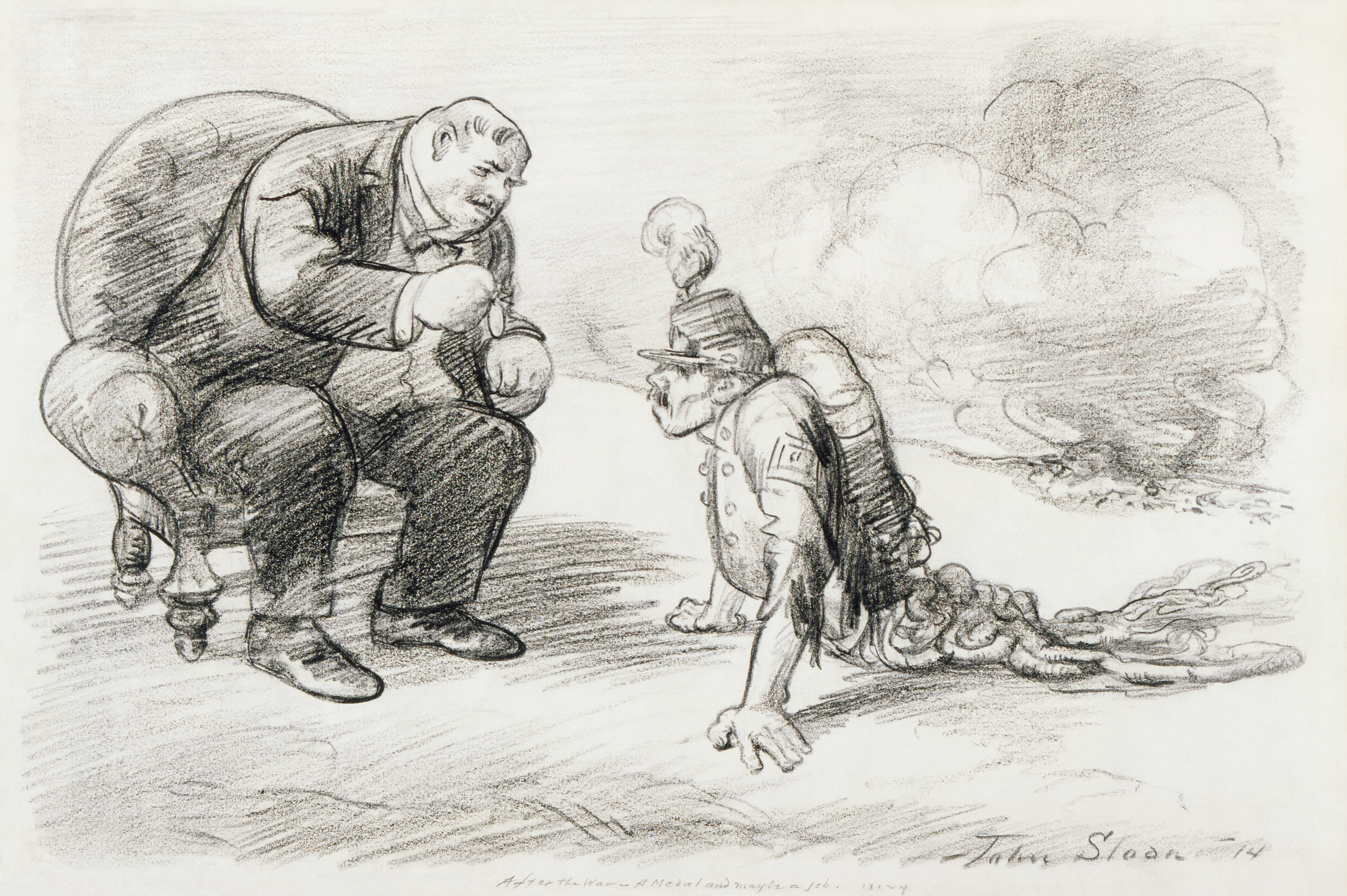
After the War a Medal and Maybe a Job, antiwar cartoon by John French Sloan, 1914

=== Henry Ford ===
Industrialist Henry Ford believed that capitalism could conquer war so he organized and funded a major effort of antiwar leaders traveling to Europe in 1915 to talk to diplomats in major countries about the need for prosperity and peace. Ford chartered an ocean liner and invited prominent peace activists to join him. He hoped to create enough publicity to prompt the belligerent nations to convene a peace conference and mediate an end to the war, but the mission was widely mocked by the press, which referred to the liner as the "Ship of Fools", as well as the "Peace Ship". Infighting between the activists, mockery by the press contingent aboard, and an outbreak of influenza marred the voyage. Four days after Oscar II arrived in Norway, a beleaguered and physically ill Ford abandoned the mission and returned to the United States. The peace mission was unsuccessful, which reinforced Ford's reputation as a supporter of unusual causes.

=== Religious groups ===
Leaders of most religious groups (except the Episcopalians) were pacifists, as were leaders of the women's movement. A concerted effort was made by anti-war leaders, including Jane Addams, Oswald Garrison Villard, David Starr Jordan, Henry Ford, Lillian Wald, and Carrie Chapman Catt. Their goal was to convince President Wilson to mediate an end of the war by bringing the belligerents to the conference table. Wilson indeed made an energetic, sustained and serious effort to do so, and kept his administration neutral, but he was repeatedly rebuffed by Britain and Germany. Finally in 1917 Wilson convinced some of them that to be truly anti-war they needed to support what Wilson promised would be "a war to end all wars". Once war was declared, the more liberal denominations, which had influenced the Social Gospel, called for a war for righteousness that would help uplift all mankind. The theme—an aspect of American exceptionalism—was that God had chosen America as his tool to bring redemption to the world.

=== Far-left and other groups ===
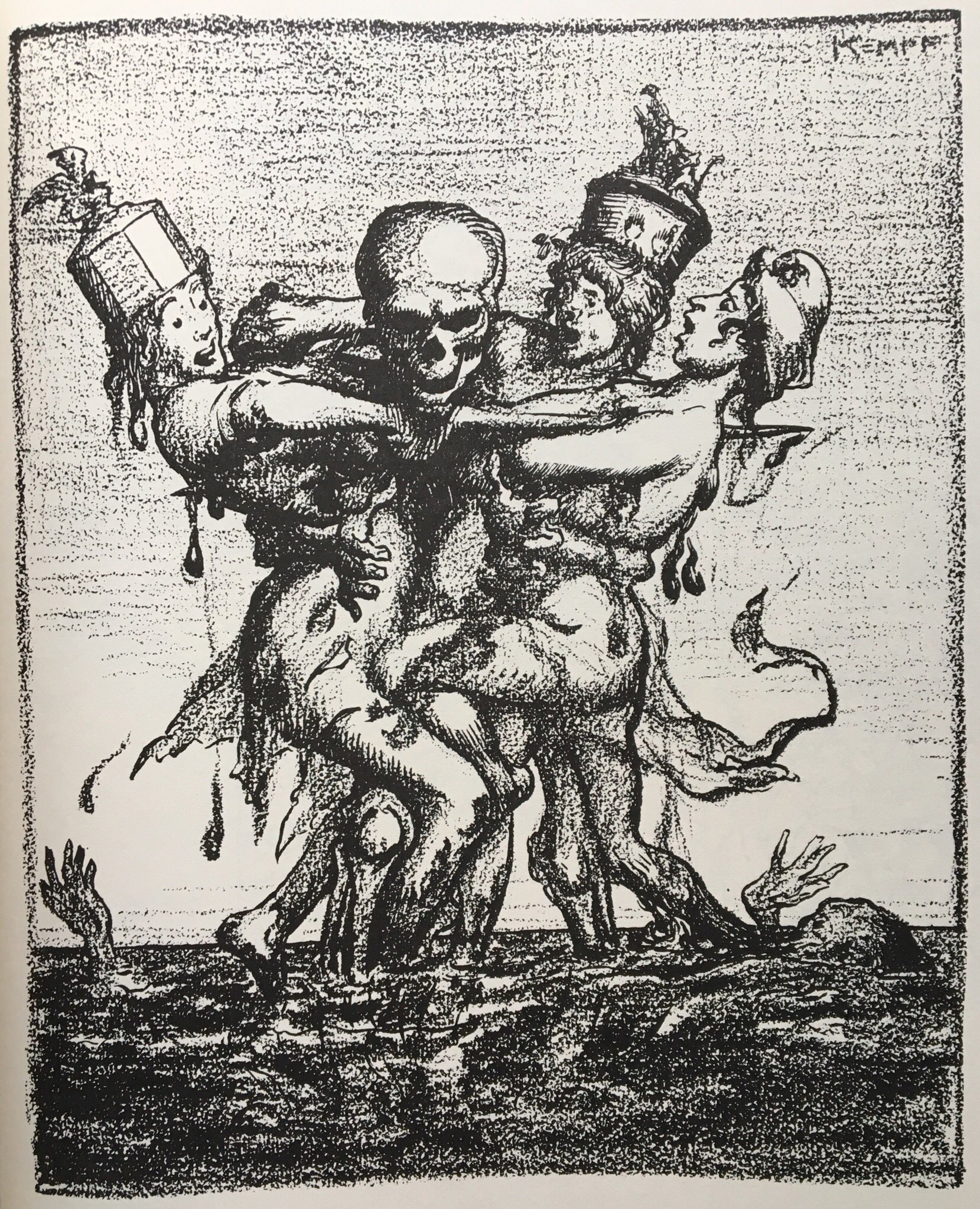
Come on in, America, the Blood's Fine! (1917) by M.A. Kempf

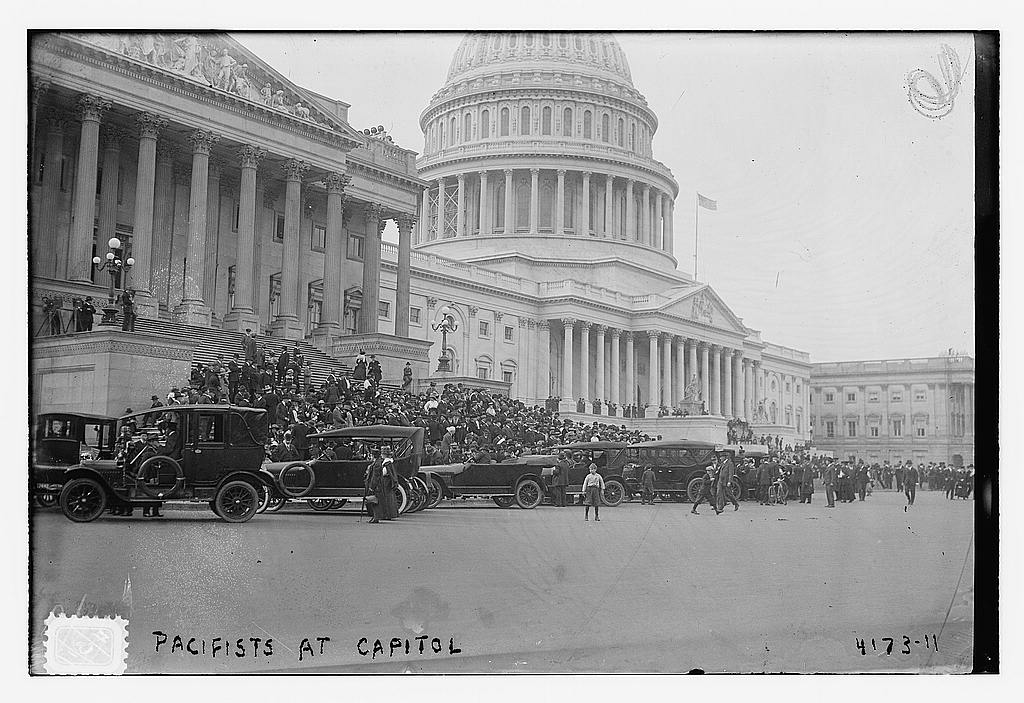
Anti-war protesters at the US Capitol in April 1917

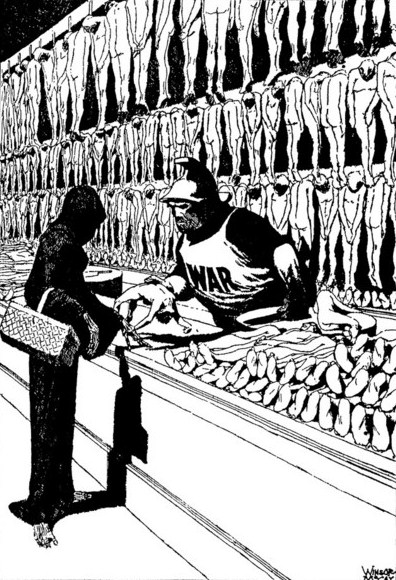
His Best Customer (1917) by Winsor McCay

Leading up to 1917 and the declaration of war against Germany, the labor unions, socialists, members of the Old Right, and pacifist groups in the United States publicly denounced participation, the obvious motive for the 1916 Preparedness Day Bombing stemming from this. When Woodrow Wilson ran for reelection in 1916 on the slogan "He Kept Us Out of War", he received support from these groups, although the Socialist Party of America ran its own candidate, Allan Benson. After Wilson was reelected, though, events quickly spiraled into war. The Zimmermann Telegram and resumption of unrestricted submarine warfare by Germany provoked outrage in the U.S., and Congress declared war on 6 April. Conscription was introduced shortly thereafter, which the anti-war movement bitterly opposed. Many socialists, typified by Walter Lippmann, became enthusiastic supporters of the war. So too did Samuel Gompers and the great majority of organized labor unions. However, the IWW—"Wobblies"—gained strength by opposing the war.

The Espionage Act of 1917 was passed to prevent spying but also contained a section which criminalized inciting or attempting to incite any mutiny, desertion, or refusal of duty in the armed forces, punishable with a fine of not more than $10,000, not more than twenty years in federal prison, or both. Thousands of Wobblies and anti-war activists were prosecuted on authority of this and the Sedition Act of 1918, which tightened restrictions even more. Among the most famous was Eugene Debs, chairman of the Socialist Party of the USA for giving an anti-draft speech in Ohio. The U.S. Supreme Court upheld these prosecutions in a series of decisions.

Conscientious objectors were punished as well, most of them Christian pacifist inductees. They were placed directly in the armed forces and court-martialed, receiving draconian sentences and harsh treatment. A number of them died in Alcatraz Prison, then a military facility. Vigilante groups were formed which suppressed dissent as well, such as by rounding up draft-age men and checking if they were in possession of draft cards or not. Ben Salmon was a Catholic conscientious objector and outspoken critic of Just War theology. During World War I, America's Roman Catholic hierarchy denounced him and The New York Times described him as a "spy suspect." The US military (in which he was never inducted) court-martialed him for desertion and spreading propaganda, then sentenced him to death (this was later revised to 25 years hard labor).

Around 300,000 American men evaded or refused conscription in World War I. Aliens such as Emma Goldman were deported, while naturalized or even native-born citizens, including Eugene Debs, lost their citizenship for their activities. Helen Keller, a socialist, and Jane Addams, a pacifist, also publicly opposed the war, but neither was prosecuted, likely because they were sympathetic figures (Keller working to help fellow deaf-blind people and Addams in charity to benefit the poor). In 1919, as the soldiers came home, disturbances continued, with veterans fighting strikers, the Seattle General Strike, race riots in the South and the Palmer Raids following two anarchist bombings. After the election of Warren G. Harding in 1920, Americans were eager to follow his campaign slogan of "Return to Normalcy." Anti-war dissidents in federal prison, such as Debs, and conscientious objectors, had their sentences commuted to time served or were pardoned on 25 December 1921. The Sedition Act was repealed in 1921, but the Espionage Act remains in force.

== In the African colonies ==
In many European colonies in Africa, the recruitment of the indigenous population to serve in the army or as porters met widespread opposition and resistance. In British Nyasaland (modern-day Malawi), the recruitment of Nyasa to serve in the East Africa Campaign contributed to the Chilembwe uprising in 1915.

== See also ==
- Recruitment to the British Army during the First World War
- British propaganda during World War I
- Dulce et Decorum est
- Home front during World War I
- Italian propaganda during World War I
- List of anti-war organizations
- List of peace activists
- Opposition to World War II
- Spirit of 1914
- Zimmerwald Conference
