= Covenant of the League of Nations =

League of Nations' charter

- Signed: 28 June 1919
- Location: Paris Peace Conference
- Effective: 10 January 1920
- Expiration: 18 April 1946
- Expiry: 31 July 1947
- Parties: League of Nations members
- Depositary: League of Nations

Full text
- Covenant of the League of Nations at Wikisource

The Covenant of the League of Nations was the charter of the League of Nations. It was signed on 28 June 1919 as Part I of the Treaty of Versailles, and became effective together with the rest of the Treaty on 10 January 1920.

== Creation ==
Early drafts for a possible League of Nations began even before the end of World War I. The London-based Bryce Group made proposals adopted by the British League of Nations Society, founded in 1915. Another group in the United States—which included Hamilton Holt and William B. Howland at the Century Association in New York City—had their own plan. This plan was largely supported by the League to Enforce Peace, an organization led by former U.S. President William Howard Taft. In December 1916, Lord Robert Cecil suggested that an official committee be set up to draft a covenant for a future league. The British committee was finally appointed in February 1918; it was led by Walter Phillimore (and became known as the Phillimore Committee) but also included Eyre Crowe, William Tyrrell, and Cecil Hurst. U.S. President Woodrow Wilson was not impressed with the Phillimore Committee's report, and would eventually produce three draft covenants of his own with help from his friend Colonel House. Suggestions were also made by Jan Christiaan Smuts in December 1918.

At the Paris Peace Conference in 1919, a commission was appointed to agree on a covenant. Members included Woodrow Wilson (as chair), Colonel House (representing the U.S.), Robert Cecil and Jan Smuts (British Empire), Léon Bourgeois and Ferdinand Larnaude (France), Prime Minister Vittorio Orlando and Vittorio Scialoja (Italy), Foreign Minister Makino Nobuaki and Chinda Sutemi (Japan), Paul Hymans (Belgium), Epitácio Pessoa (Brazil), Wellington Koo (China), Jayme Batalha Reis (Portugal), and Milenko Radomar Vesnitch (Serbia). Further representatives of Czechoslovakia, Greece, Poland and Romania were later added. The group considered a preliminary draft co-written by Hurst and President Wilson's adviser David Hunter Miller. During the first four months of 1919 the group met on ten separate occasions, attempting to negotiate the exact terms of the foundational Covenant agreement for the future League.

During the ensuing negotiations various major objections arose from various countries. France wanted the League to form an international army to enforce its decisions, but the British worried such an army would be dominated by the French, and the Americans could not agree as only Congress could declare war. Japan requested that a clause upholding the principle of racial equality should be inserted, parallel to the existing religious equality clause. This was deeply opposed, particularly by American political sentiment, while Wilson himself simply ignored the question.

During a certain interval while Wilson was away, the question of international equality was raised once again. A vote on a motion supporting the "equality of nations and the just treatment of their nationals" was made, and was supported by 11 of the 19 delegates. Upon Wilson's return he declared that "serious objections" by other delegates had negated the majority vote, and the amendment was dismissed. Finally on 11 April 1919, the revised Hurst-Miller draft was approved, but without fully resolving certain questions as had been brought forth regarding matters such as national equality, racial equality, and how the new League might be able to practically enforce its various mandates.

The new League would include a General Assembly (representing all member states), an Executive Council (with membership limited to major powers), and a permanent secretariat. Member states were expected to "respect and preserve as against external aggression" the territorial integrity of other members, and to disarm "to the lowest point consistent with domestic safety". All states were required to submit complaints for arbitration or judicial inquiry before going to war. The Executive Council would create a Permanent Court of International Justice to make judgements on the disputes.

The treaty entered into force on 10 January 1920. Articles 4, 6, 12, 13, and 15 were amended in 1924. The treaty shares similar provisions and structures with the UN Charter.

== Article 10 ==
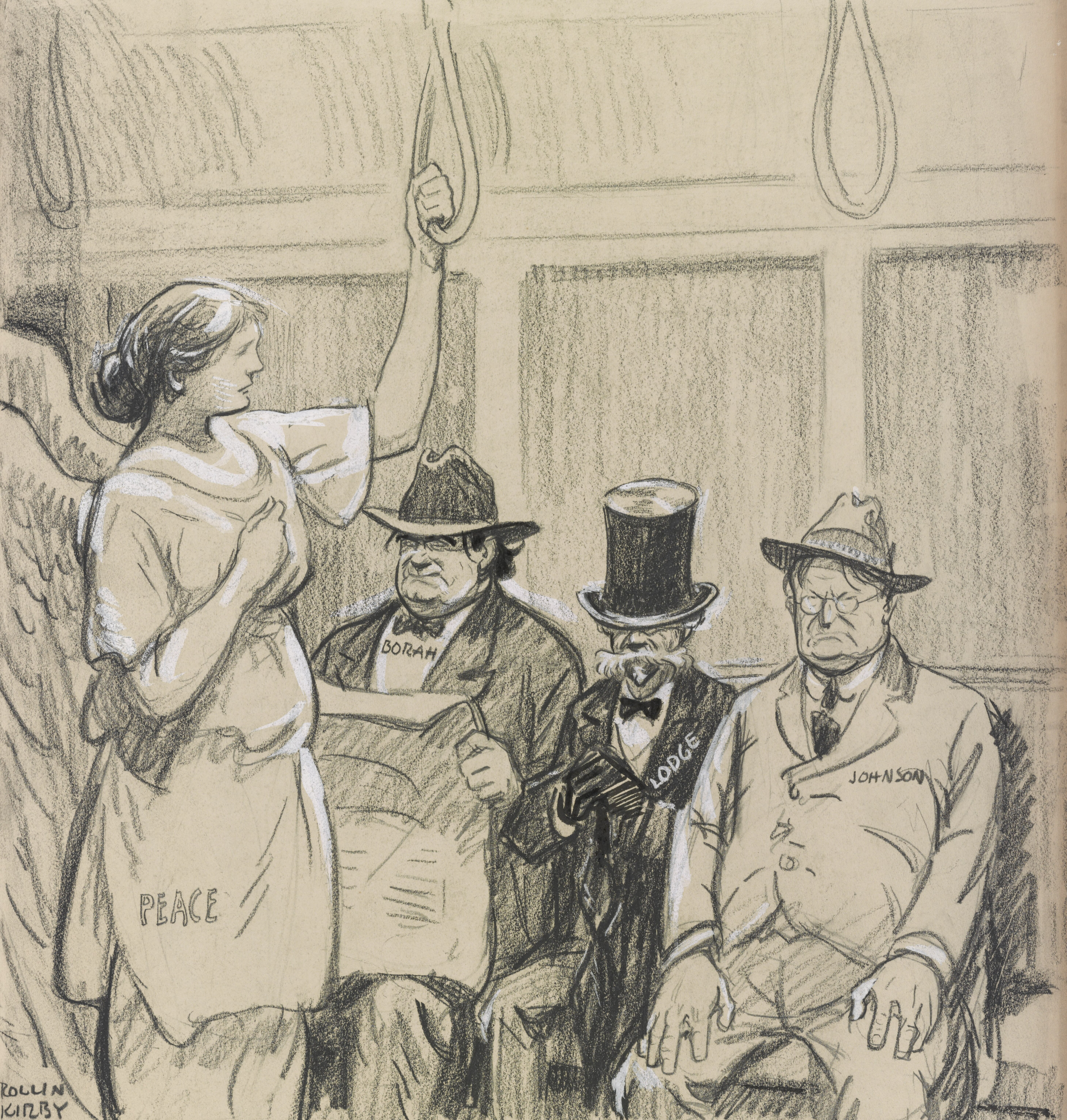
Cartoon showing Senators Borah, Lodge and Johnson blocking Peace

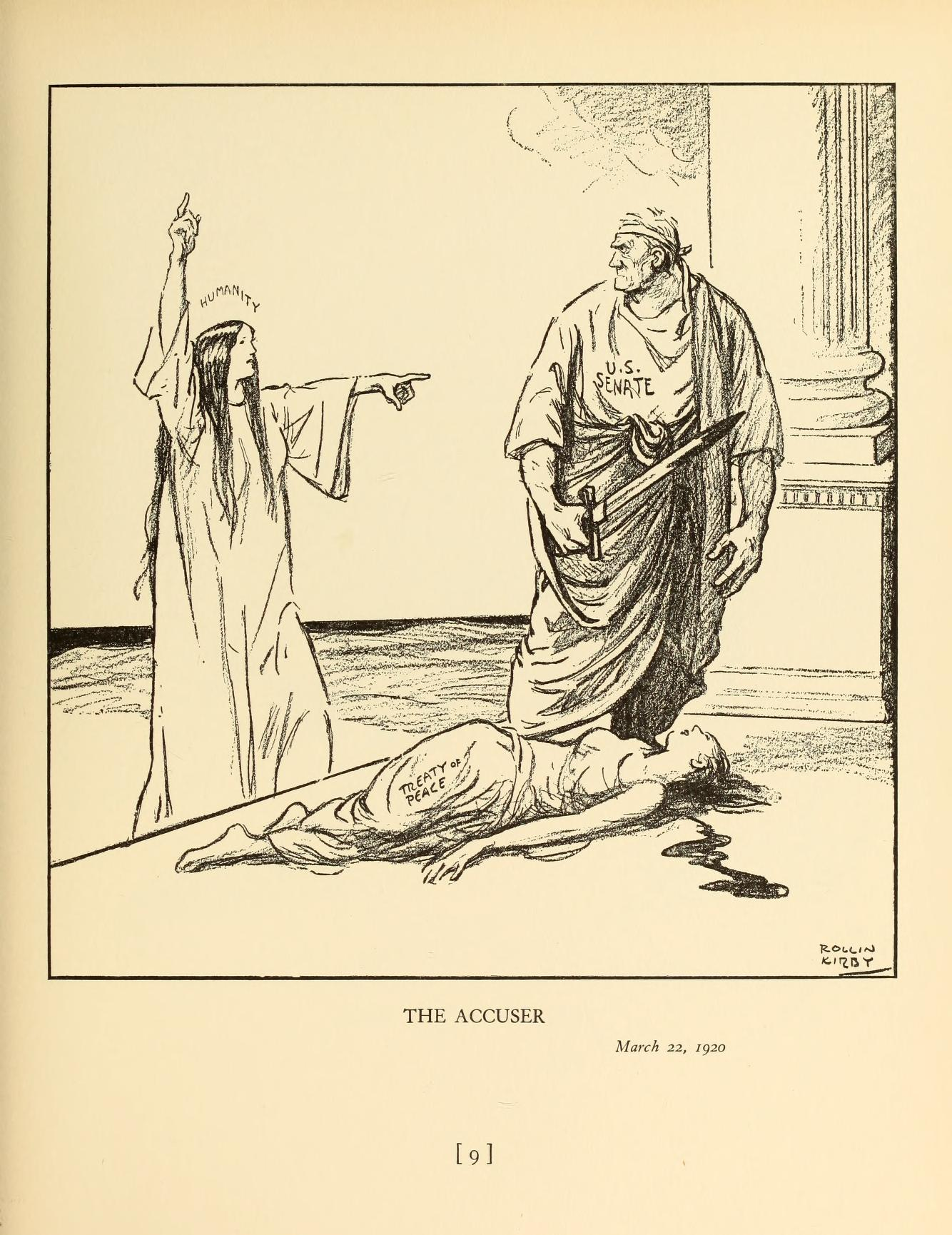
Cartoon showing Humanity accusing the US Senate who has just murdered the Peace Treaty

Article 10 of the Covenant of the League of Nations obliged members of the League "to respect and preserve as against external aggression the territorial integrity and existing political independence of all Members of the League". It was noted that a League of Nations member was not bound to assist a fellow member in combating internal secessionists, but also meant that no country should provide assistance to such rebels. It was also understood that if any member or non-member of the League was defeated while undertaking an aggressive war, the Covenant did not protect that defeated party against the consequence of a loss of territory and political independence (e.g., the Soviet Union's annexation of the northern part of East Prussia from Nazi Germany after World War II).

U.S. President Woodrow Wilson had secured his proposal to apply to become part of the League of Nations in the final draft of the Treaty of Versailles, but the United States Senate failed to consent to the ratification of the Treaty. (It had voted 49–35 in favor of ratification, but could not reach the necessary two-thirds majority.) For many Republicans in the Senate, Article 10 was the most objectionable provision. Their objections were based on the fact that, by ratifying such a document, the United States would be bound by an international contract to defend a League of Nations member if it was attacked. Henry Cabot Lodge from Massachusetts and Frank B. Brandegee from Connecticut led the fight in the U.S. Senate against ratification, believing that it was best not to become involved in international conflicts. Under the United States Constitution, the President of the United States may not ratify a treaty unless the Senate, by a two-thirds vote, gives its advice and consent. The primary intent of Article 10 was to preserve a balance of power by preventing one country from invading another.

In a statement by President Wilson to the Senate, he described Article 10 as advisory in nature, and that Congress under the War Powers Clause was free to interpret or reject even a unanimous vote of the League Council invoking Article 10. He went on to say that Article 10 "is a moral, not a legal, obligation...it is binding in conscience only, not in law."

== Article 16 ==
Article 16 gave the members of the League the power to levy sanctions or use force against another member that committed a war of aggression. However, this article was very weak in practice, as the Covenant had been written under the assumption that League members would be willing to cooperate with each other. Amid the Great Depression, the great powers were reluctant to further damage their own economies by sanctioning another great power, and the policy used was largely appeasement.

During the Japanese invasion of Manchuria, there was no attempt by the great powers to invoke Article 16, despite calls to do so from the small powers. The League of Nations Council did attempt to pass a resolution (outside of Article 16) stating that the Empire of Japan must withdraw, but it was vetoed by the single negative vote of the Empire of Japan. Afterward, the League invoked Article 15, treating the invasion as a 'dispute', and the Council referred the case to the Assembly. In a 35-page report, the Assembly voted 42–1 to recognize Manchuria as territory under Chinese sovereignty, with the negative vote of the Empire of Japan not counting under Article 15 rules, thus making the recognition unanimous. However, without Article 16, there was no way for the League to enforce this resolution, and the Empire of Japan withdrew from the League a month later.

During the invasion and occupation of Ethiopia by Italy under Mussolini, Article 16 was invoked for the first (and only) time. Proceedings were complicated by the fact that under the Covenant, neither the Council nor the Assembly was responsible for passing sanctions, making the measures voluntary by each state rather than obligatory. Therefore, there was no Council or Assembly resolution mandating sanctions. Instead, Article 15 was initially invoked again, treating the hostilities as a 'dispute', and a non-binding committee appointed by the Council to investigate the dispute (under Article 5) submitted a report explicitly stating that Italy had started a war in violation of the Covenant, and invoking Article 16. The Council then did not vote on the report, but all members other than Italy verbally stated that they agreed with it, and again referred the case to the Assembly. The Assembly then discussed sanctions, and 50 out of 54 members voluntarily agreed to apply them (Italy, Austria, Hungary, and Albania refused). The sanctions were weak and failed to stop the war, as member states were again reluctant to damage their own economies. Bank loans and arms were sanctioned, but oil and coal, viewed as necessary for Mussolini's war machine, were not.

By this point, the Axis powers had been created, consisting of great powers that had already withdrawn. This left the League powerless against Imperial Japan's full-scale invasion of China, the Anschluss, the German occupation of Czechoslovakia, and the Italian invasion of Albania. Article 17 made it theoretically possible to apply the sanctions of Article 16 against non-members of the League, but no member made any serious attempt to do this, instead preparing their militaries for the now-inevitable start of World War II in Europe.

Article 16, in addition to sanctions, also gave specifically to the Council the power to "recommend" military action against a member of the League that committed a war of aggression. Again there was no enforcement mechanism, the League had no peacekeepers of its own, and members were individually responsible for supplying any military forces. This part of Article 16 was never invoked.

Finally, Article 16 gave the League the power to expel Covenant-breaking members. This was only used once against the Soviet Union for its invasion of Finland.

== Article 22 ==
Article 22 referred to the creation of Mandate territories, which were given over to be administered by European powers. Though most Mandates were given to countries such as Britain and France, which possessed considerable colonial empires, the Covenant made the clear distinction that a Mandate territory was not a colony.

The Covenant asserted that such territories were "inhabited by peoples not yet able to stand by themselves under the strenuous conditions of the modern world" and so "the tutelage of such peoples should be entrusted to advanced nations who by reason of their resources, their experience or their geographical position can best undertake this responsibility" as "a sacred trust of civilization".

Mandate territories were sorted into several sub-categories:

- "Communities formerly belonging to the Turkish Empire" were considered "to have reached a stage of development where their existence as independent nations could be provisionally recognized" and the Mandatory powers were charged with "rendering administrative advice and assistance until such time as they are able to stand alone".
- Regarding "Other peoples, especially those of Central Africa" the Mandatory powers were charged to "guarantee freedom of conscience and religion, subject only to the maintenance of public order and morals, the prohibition of abuses such as the slave trade, the arms traffic and the liquor traffic, and the prevention of the establishment of fortifications or military and naval bases and of military training of the natives for other than police purposes and the defence of territory", and no mention was made of any eventual independence.
- With regard to "Territories, such as South-West Africa and certain of the South Pacific Islands", they were assumed "owing to the sparseness of their population, or their small size, or their remoteness from the centres of civilisation, or their geographical contiguity to the territory of the Mandatory, and other circumstances" to be "best administered under the laws of the Mandatory as integral portions of its territory, subject to the safeguards above mentioned in the interests of the indigenous population". The reference to "geographical contiguity to the territory of the Mandatory" clearly related to South West Africa (now Namibia) being made a Mandate of South Africa, rather than of Britain.

== See also ==
- Charter of the United Nations
- General Act for the Pacific Settlement of International Disputes
- Peace treaty
- Treaty series
