= Member states of the League of Nations =

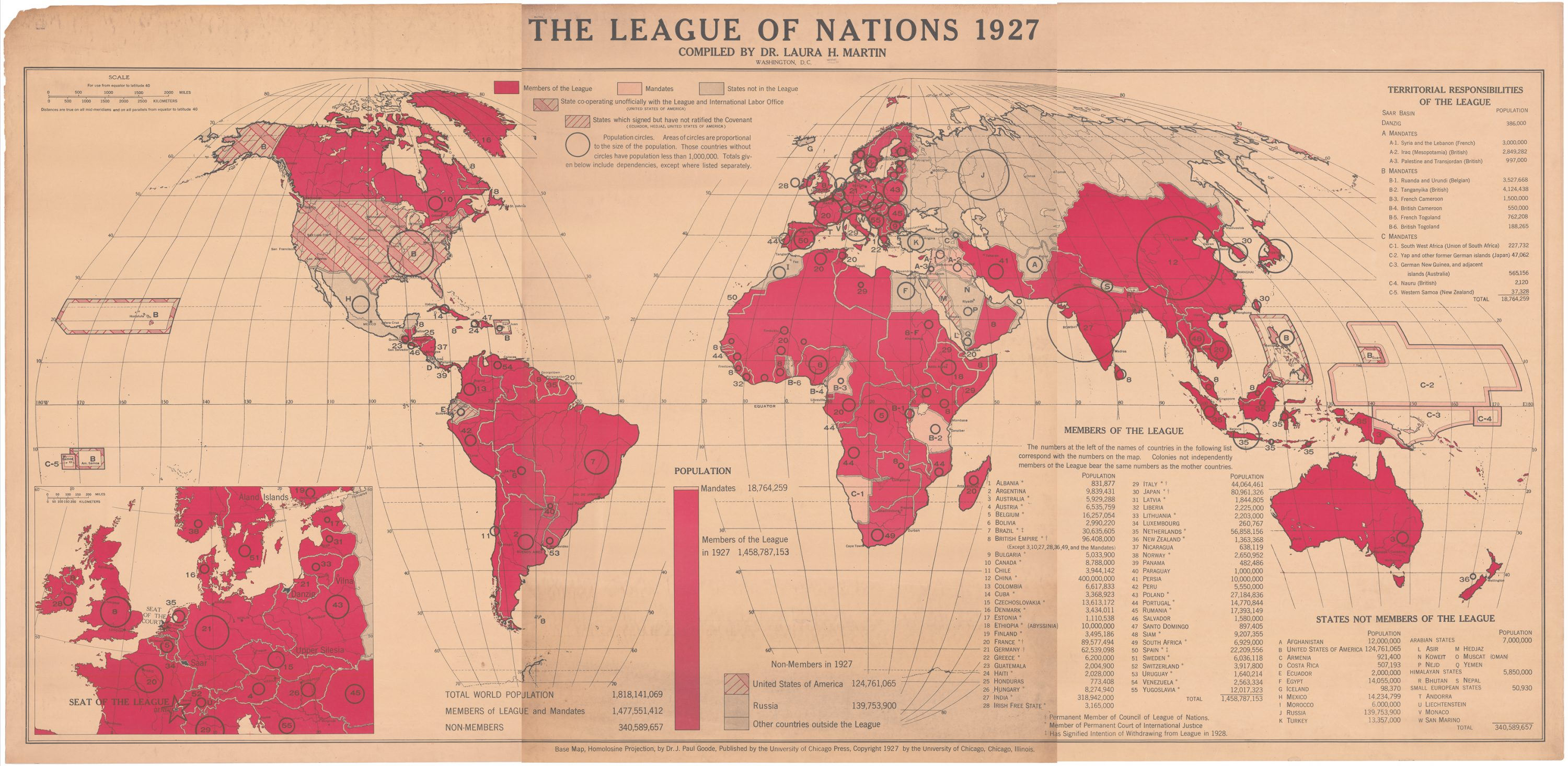
Map of League of Nations members as of 1927.

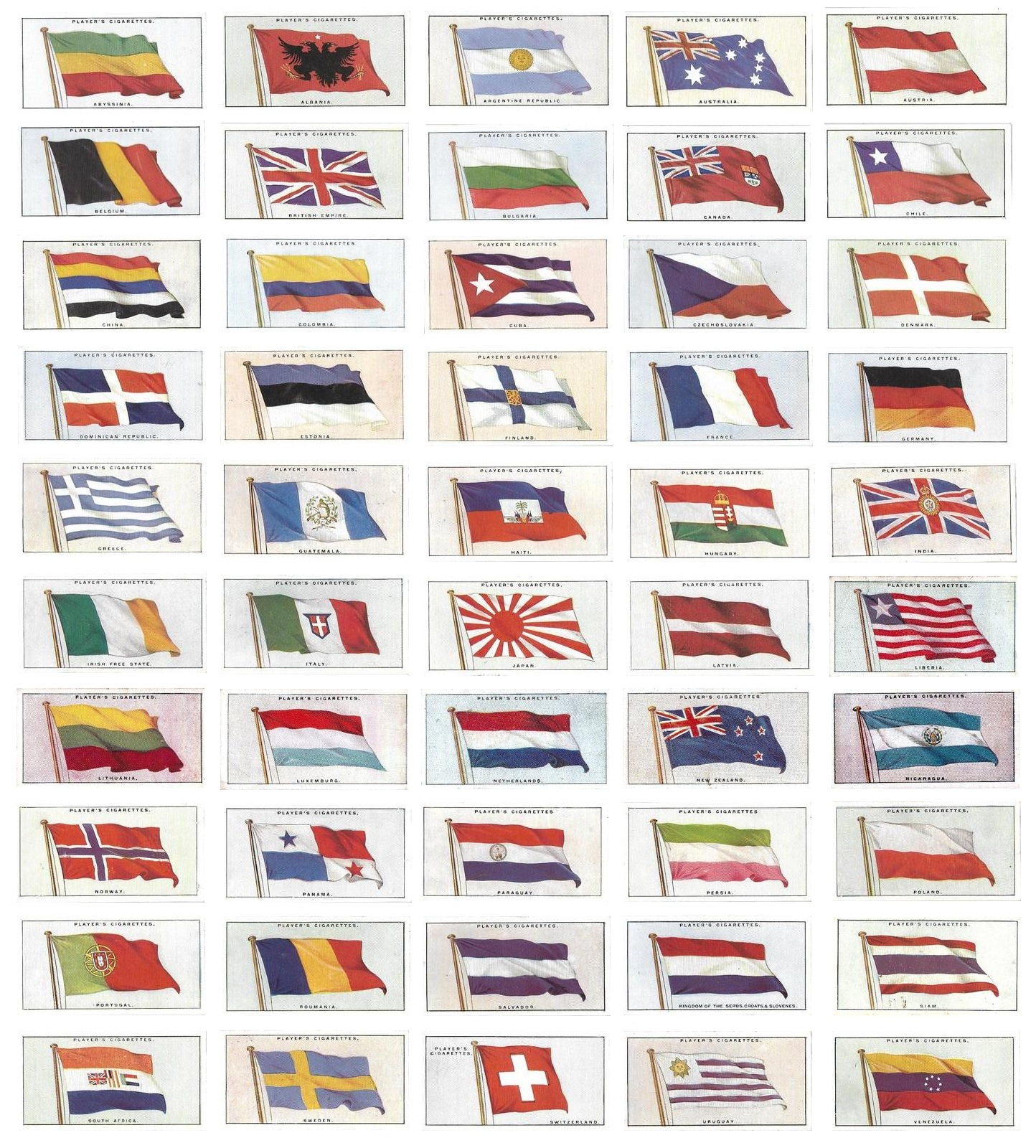
Flags of League of Nations members as of 1928.

Between 1920 and 1946, a total of 63 countries became member states of the League of Nations.

When the Assembly of the League of Nations first met, it consisted of 42 founding members. A further 21 countries joined between then and the dissolution of the League.

Since various nations left the League at different points, its full roster of 63 countries was never represented simultaneously. The League's greatest extent was from 28 September 1934 (when Ecuador joined) to February 1935 (when Paraguay withdrew) with 58 countries. At this time, only Costa Rica (December 1924), Brazil (June 1926), Japan (March 1933), and Germany (October 1933) had withdrawn, and only Egypt joined later (on 26 May 1937).

== Founding members ==
The Covenant of the League of Nations was part of the Treaty of Versailles, signed on 28 June 1919 between the Allies of World War I and Germany. In order for the treaty to enter into force, it had to be deposited at Paris; in order to be deposited, it had to be ratified by Germany and any three of the five Principal Powers (the United States of America, the British Empire, France, Italy, and the Empire of Japan). Any Allied signatory that ratified the treaty would automatically join the League.

Germany was forced to ratify the treaty first, which it did on 10 July 1919. Italy ratified on 7 October 1919, the British Empire and its colonies ratified on 10 October 1919, and France ratified on 12 October 1919. These ratifications were deposited (along with those of ten other countries) on 10 January 1920. All but three of the remaining signatories (the United States, Ecuador, and the Kingdom of Hejaz) had ratified by the time the Assembly first met on 15 November 1920. (Note: Panama's ratification document did not make it to the League until ten days after the first session of the Assembly, but it had communicated its ratification by telegram beforehand.)

The Covenant also invited 13 neutral nations to join the League. To join, an invitee had to agree ("accede without reservation") to the Covenant within two months of the League's founding. All 13 invitees accepted their invitations within the two-month deadline; four of them accepted their invitations even before the League was founded.

The United States Senate voted 49–35 in favor of ratification, but this failed to reach the necessary two-thirds majority. Hejaz refused to join the League due to the League giving control of Palestine from the broken-up Ottoman Empire to the British Empire. Ecuador would not ratify the treaty until 1934; as an original Allied signatory, it was entitled to join the League this way with no deadline or Assembly vote, and the League considered Ecuador to still be a founding member.

Uniquely, China (then the Beiyang government) joined the League by ratifying the Treaty of St. Germain (with Austria) instead of the Treaty of Versailles (with Germany), as both treaties included the Covenant of the League of Nations. It had refused to sign the Treaty of Versailles due to it giving the previously-German-controlled Shandong colony in China to the Empire of Japan.

Additional members could join the League by a two-thirds vote of the Assembly.

== List ==
Founding members below are listed in the order matching the Covenant (signatories first, followed by invitees), except for Ecuador. The colonies of the British Empire immediately followed it and did not sign in alphabetical order. Czechoslovakia and El Salvador were alphabetized under 'S'.

A country was allowed to send a withdrawal notice at any time, but it would take two years to come into effect after the League received it, and meanwhile the country would retain both its obligations and its membership. In practice, a withdrawing country quit the League immediately, and was absent from all sessions and votes for the last two years of its formal membership. The "Date of withdrawal" column shows when the withdrawal notice was sent.

Original Allied signatory Original invitee

List of members
Member state	Date of admission	Date of withdrawal (Note: Sources:)	Notes
Belgium	10 January 1920		
Bolivia	10 January 1920		
Brazil	10 January 1920	12 June 1926	Withdrew upon rejection of a resolution to give Brazil the United States' vacant permanent Council seat.
British Empire (Note: The League switched from using "British Empire" to "United Kingdom of Great Britain and Northern Ireland" after the Statute of Westminster 1931. The short names "Great Britain" and "United Kingdom" were both used, at times within the same document. The United Kingdom continued to be alphabetized under "British" or "Britain".)	10 January 1920		All six members joined from one ratification document.
Canada	10 January 1920		All six members joined from one ratification document.
Australia	10 January 1920		All six members joined from one ratification document.
South Africa (Note: South Africa was alphabetized under 'A' even in English.)	10 January 1920		All six members joined from one ratification document.
New Zealand	10 January 1920		All six members joined from one ratification document.
India	10 January 1920		All six members joined from one ratification document.
China	16 July 1920		
Cuba	8 March 1920		
France; Free France (1943-44)	10 January 1920		Vichy France sent a notice of withdrawal 19 April 1941, which the League recognized. Free France did not recognize Vichy France's withdrawal and rescinded the notice 15 and 16 April 1943, (Note: On 15 April 1943, General Henri Giraud sent the message to the League's Supervisory Commission. On 16 April 1943, General Charles de Gaulle sent the message to the Secretary-General of the League.) which the League also recognized.
Greece	30 March 1920		
Guatemala	10 January 1920	14 May 1936	Withdrawal notice received by the League 26 May 1936.
Haiti	30 June 1920	16 February 1942	Withdrawal notice received by the League 8 April 1942.
Honduras	3 November 1920	22 June 1936	Withdrawal notice received by the League 10 July 1936.
Italy	10 January 1920	11 December 1937	Quit after the League sanctioned it for invading Ethiopia.
Japan	10 January 1920	25 March 1933	Quit after the League refused to recognize the puppet state of Manchukuo.
Liberia	30 June 1920		
Nicaragua	3 November 1920	26 June 1936	
Panama	25 November 1920		
Peru	10 January 1920	4 April 1939	
Poland	10 January 1920		
Portugal	8 April 1920		
Romania	14 September 1920	10 July 1940	
Kingdom of Serbs, Croats, and Slovenes	10 February 1920		Renamed Yugoslavia in 1929.
Siam	10 January 1920		Renamed Thailand in 1939. Briefly renamed back to Siam in 1945, but reverted to Thailand 1949.
Czechoslovakia	10 January 1920		Occupied and annexed by Nazi Germany 15 March 1939; never withdrew.
Uruguay	10 January 1920		
Argentina	10 January 1920		Invitee; accepted 18 July 1919. Quit 4 December 1920 without sending a notice of withdrawal; resumed participation 26 September 1933.
Chile	10 January 1920	31 May 1938	Invitee; accepted 4 November 1919.
Colombia	16 February 1920		Invitee.
Denmark	8 March 1920		Invitee. Occupied by Nazi Germany 9 April 1940 and forced to withdraw 19 July 1940; withdrawal not recognized by the League. Withdrawal notice rescinded in 1945.
Netherlands	9 March 1920		Invitee.
Norway	9 March 1920		Invitee.
Paraguay	10 January 1920	23 February 1935	Invitee; accepted 29 October 1919. Quit during the Chaco War after rejecting the League's arbitration.
Persia	10 January 1920		Invitee; accepted 21 November 1919. Renamed Iran in 1935.
El Salvador	10 March 1920	26 July 1937	Invitee. Withdrawal notice received by the League 10 August 1938.
Spain; Spanish Republic	10 January 1920	8 May 1939	Invitee. Withdrew 8 September 1926 with the formal 2-year notice; rejoined 22 March 1928 before the 2 years were up. Quit after Francisco Franco came to power.
Sweden	9 March 1920		Invitee.
Switzerland	8 March 1920		Invitee.
Venezuela	3 March 1920	11 July 1938	Invitee.
Austria	15 December 1920	18 March 1938	The League recognized the Anschluss (five days afterward) and removed Austria from its list of members.
Bulgaria	16 December 1920		
Costa Rica	16 December 1920	24 December 1924	Gave slightly more than two years' notice, with its membership formally ceasing 1 January 1927.
Finland	16 December 1920		
Luxembourg	16 December 1920		
Albania	17 December 1920		Occupied by Italy 12 April 1939; the puppet government sent a notice of withdrawal to the League 13 April 1939, but the League did not recognize the puppet government or accept the notice.
Estonia	22 September 1921		Occupied by the Soviet Union and annexed 6 August 1940; never withdrew.
Latvia	22 September 1921		Occupied by the Soviet Union and annexed 5 August 1940; never withdrew.
Lithuania	22 September 1921		Occupied by the Soviet Union and annexed 3 August 1940; never withdrew.
Hungary	18 September 1922	11 April 1939	
Irish Free State	10 September 1923		Renamed Ireland in 1937.
Abyssinia	28 September 1923		The League switched from using "Abyssinia" to "Ethiopia" between September 1934 and September 1935. Occupied by the Italian Empire and annexed from 9 May 1936 to 5 May 1941; never withdrew.
Dominican Republic	29 September 1924		
Germany	8 September 1926	19 October 1933	Quit after Hitler came to power.
Mexico	12 September 1931		The League invited Mexico to join on 8 September 1931.
Turkey	18 July 1932		
Iraq	3 October 1932		
Soviet Union	18 September 1934	14 December 1939	§ Expulsion of the Soviet Union
Afghanistan	27 September 1934		
Ecuador	28 September 1934		
Egypt	26 May 1937		

== Expulsion of the Soviet Union ==
On 14 December 1939, the Soviet Union was expelled for invading Finland in violation of the Covenant of the League of Nations, by a Council vote of 7–0–4–3 (7 in favor, 0 against, 4 abstaining, 3 absent). The United Kingdom, France, Belgium, Bolivia, the Dominican Republic, South Africa, and Egypt voted in favor; the Republic of China, Finland, Greece, and Yugoslavia abstained; and Iran, Peru, and the Soviet Union itself were absent. Three of the votes in favor had been made Council members the day before the vote (South Africa, Bolivia, and Egypt). This was one of the League's final acts before it practically ceased to function.

It has been disputed whether the expulsion was legally valid. Article 16 paragraph 4 of the Covenant stated that the Council may expel a member from the League if all members of the Council other than the to-be-expelled member concur. However, it is unclear if abstentions or absences were permitted for expulsion votes, though it is undisputed that they were allowed for all of the council's other unanimous decisions. Even so, it is disputed whether the expulsion could be legally valid without a majority (8 out of 14) of the Council in favor.

Regardless, both the expulsion and any possible dispute of it had little practical effect. The Soviet Union had already declared nine days earlier that it would be absent from the League until further notice; it acknowledged its expulsion and made no effort to challenge it on any grounds. No other member was ever expelled from the League to demonstrate any precedent, and the League took no further significant actions with the outbreak of the Second World War.

== Non-members ==
Between November and December 1920, Armenia, Azerbaijan, Georgia, and Ukraine applied for membership amid the dissolution of the Russian Empire and the Russian Civil War, but were denied because they did "not appear to have a stable government whose authority extends over the whole of its territory". (Some extra consideration was given to Armenia due to it being a signatory of the Treaty of Sèvres, which would have given Armenia some territory from the broken-up Ottoman Empire, but the treaty failed to be ratified.) Estonia, Latvia, and Lithuania also applied in 1920 and were denied that year because they "had not achieved a definite international status" at the time (the three would be admitted the next year).

Some of the European microstates, namely Liechtenstein, Monaco, and San Marino, also applied for membership but were denied, explicitly "by reason of their small size". Monaco applied for membership on 6 April 1920, but withdrew the application on 22 October 1920. San Marino applied on 25 April 1919, but its application lapsed when it failed to respond to a request for information by 22 August 1920. Liechtenstein pursued its application with vigor, leading its application to be considered by the League admissions committee. The committee concluded, "there can be no doubt that juridically the Principality of Liechtenstein is a sovereign State", but found that because Liechtenstein delegated some state functions to other states, it "could not discharge all the international obligations which would be imposed on her by the Covenant." The committee voted 28 to 1 (with only Switzerland voting in favor of admission) against admission for Liechtenstein (with 13 abstentions). The decision has been criticized by international lawyers who have noted that other entities, which lacked the powers typically associated with sovereign states, were allowed to be member states.

Andorra and Vatican City never sought membership. Iceland was given the opportunity to join the League of Nations in 1920, but opted not to, primarily due to limited administrative resources.

Newfoundland was the only British dominion which did not apply for membership of the League, which Arthur Berriedale Keith attributed to its "small size and microscopic population" (less than 300,000 people at the time). It had also been denied separate representation at the Paris Peace Conference and was less active in foreign affairs compared to the other dominions.

Some relatively-isolated sovereign states in Asia also did not join, including Bhutan, Nepal, and Yemen, at least in part due to having no diplomatic relations with the major powers. Mongolia (from 1921) and Tibet were de facto independent, but their independence was not recognized by the major powers. The Chinese Soviet Republic declared independence in 1931, had no diplomatic relations, and criticized the Lytton Commission and the League while making no attempt to join. (Note: By contrast, the CCP praised the United Nations and sent its own delegate to the UNCIO in 1945.)

The Kingdom of Hejaz declined to join in 1920, and was conquered by the Sultanate of Nejd in 1925, creating the Kingdom of Hejaz and Nejd. The dual monarchy was consolidated to become Saudi Arabia in 1932. Saudi Arabia never joined the League.

The Sultanate of Muscat and Oman never joined the League of Nations; it was de jure an independent state but was considered a de facto British protectorate.

At the IX Congress of European Nationalities, an organization of the League of Nations, held in Bern, the first three autonomous jurisdictions of Spain (Basque Country, Galicia, and Catalonia), were recognized as nations, but since they were not constitutionally independent, they were represented by the Spanish government.

== World War II and aftermath ==
Several member states were occupied or annexed during World War II, during which the League was largely paralyzed and held no sessions or votes. With the exception of the Anschluss, the League did not recognize any of these occupations, and the occupied states remained members of the League on paper. With the exception of Vichy France (later rescinded by Free France), the League also did not recognize any notices of withdrawal sent by puppet regimes, considering them to have been sent under duress. Not all puppet regimes attempted to withdraw.

The membership table above notes occupations that began before the start of World War II in Europe, those that continued after the end of World War II, and those whose puppet states attempted to withdraw. For brevity, the large number of occupations that do not meet these criteria (such as in the case of Luxembourg) are not listed.

The 20th annual session of the Assembly took place in 1939, but the 21st session did not take place until April 1946, after which the League ceased to exist. During this last session, 35 out of 44 League members attended, with Albania, Bulgaria, Ethiopia, Iraq, Liberia, Thailand, and the Baltic states not present. (Colombia was present, but only as a non-voting observer as its government had not authorized its representative on whether to vote for or against the dissolution of the League. Allied-occupied Austria was also permitted to send an observer with approval from its occupiers and the rest of the League.)

The League partially did not recognize the Soviet occupation of the Baltic states, which were the only member states of the League to remain occupied after the end of World War II. In its last session, Estonia, Latvia, and Lithuania remained on the list of members of the League. However, two months before the session, the League (Note: Specifically, the Secretary-General of the League, with agreement from the President of the Assembly and the President of the Council) stated that it would not consider the 1939 documents of any representatives as valid, and required the governments of the League members to furnish new documents naming representatives. When the representatives of the Latvian government-in-exile and Lithuanian government-in-exile attempted to attend the session, a Secretariat staff member denied their 1939 documents as instructed, and explicitly stated that there did not exist any government which could provide them with the necessary credentials. The letter documenting this incident refers to the representatives as the "permanent delegate of Latvia" and "permanent delegate of Lithuania" as titles. (The letter does not mention the presence of the delegate of Estonia.) The staff member offered the representatives, and their family members and assistants, entry into the League's diplomatic gallery to spectate the session, but the representatives refused the offer for themselves, while accepting it for their family members and assistants. In addition, the offered entry card, and even the envelope containing the card, explicitly omitted a country name and a title.

The League of Nations was formally dissolved on 18 April 1946; its assets and responsibilities were transferred to the United Nations.

== Map ==
A map of the world in the years 1920–1945, which shows the League of Nations members during its history. Members Colonies of members Mandates Non-members Colonies of non-members

== See also ==
- Latin America and the League of Nations
- Member states of the United Nations
