= Goldsworthy Lowes Dickinson =

British historian and activist (1862–1932)

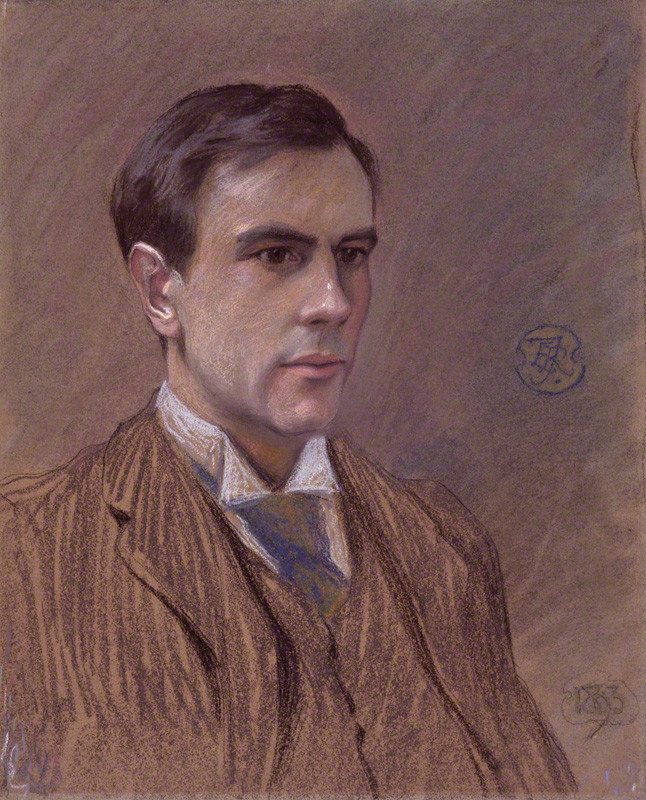
Dickinson in 1893, by Roger Fry

Goldsworthy Lowes Dickinson (6 August 1862 – 3 August 1932), known as Goldie, was a British political scientist and philosopher. He lived most of his life at Cambridge, where he wrote a dissertation on Neoplatonism before becoming a fellow. He was closely associated with the Bloomsbury Group.

Dickinson was deeply distressed by Britain's involvement in the First World War. Within a fortnight of the war's breaking out, he drew up the idea of a League of Nations, and his subsequent writings helped to shape public opinion towards the creation of the League.

Within the field of international relations, Dickinson is prominent for popularizing conceptions of the international system as being an international anarchy. In contrast to many of his contemporaries who attributed the causes of war to national and imperial expansion or to population growth, Dickinson argued that war was rooted in fear and suspicion caused by anarchy and arms races.

== Life ==
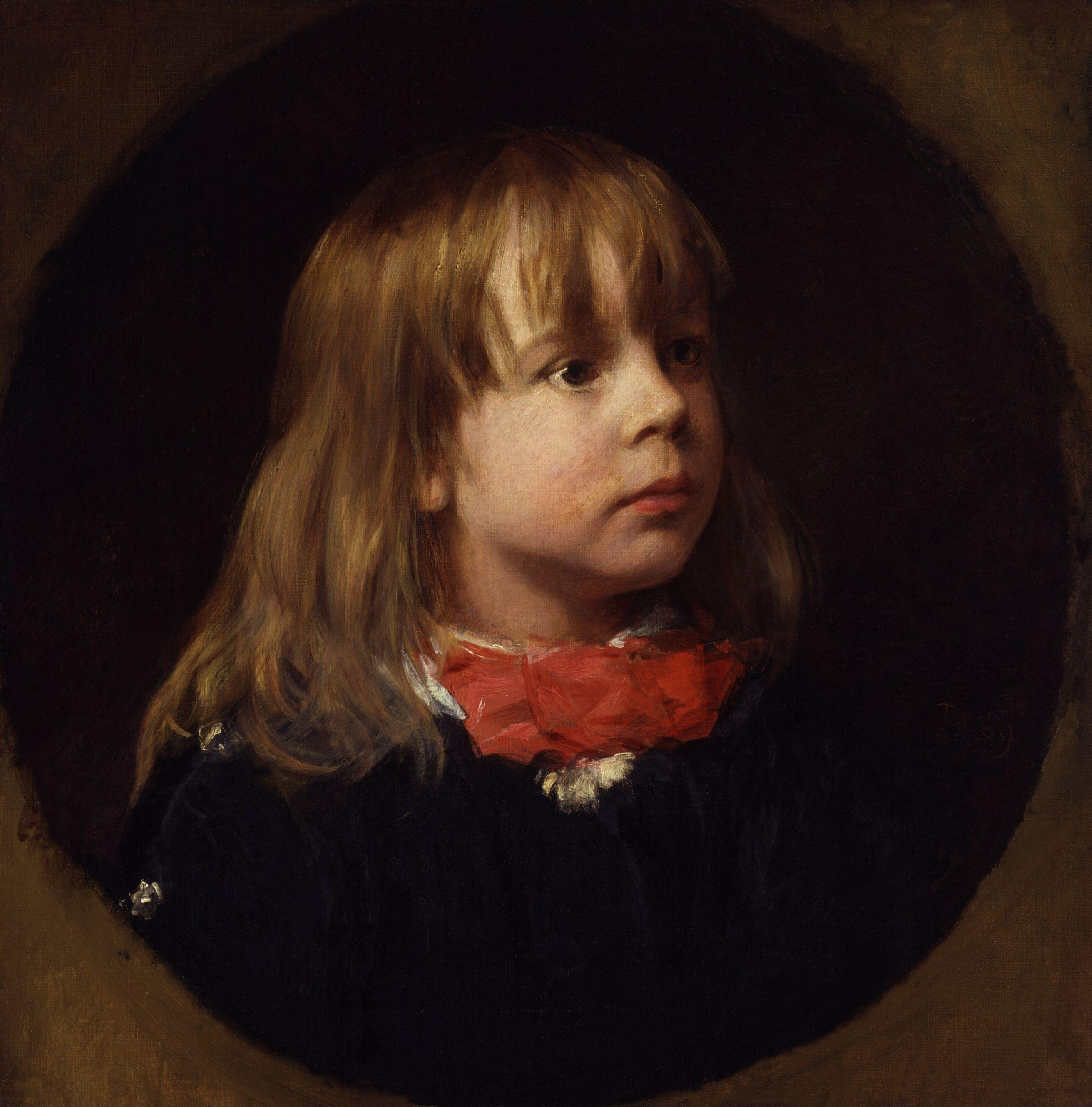
Dickinson in 1869, by his father

=== Early years ===
Dickinson was born in London, the son of Lowes Cato Dickinson (1819–1908), a portrait painter, by his marriage to Margaret Ellen Williams, a daughter of William Smith Williams who was a literary advisor to Smith, Elder & Company and had discovered Charlotte Brontë. When the boy was about one year old his family moved to the Spring Cottage in Hanwell, then a country village. The family also included his brother, Arthur, three years older, an older sister, May, and two younger sisters, Hester and Janet.

His education included attendance at a day school in Somerset Street, Portman Square, when he was ten or eleven. At about the age of twelve, he was sent to Beomonds, a boarding school in Chertsey, and his teenage years from 14 to 19 were spent at Charterhouse School in Godalming, where his brother Arthur had preceded him. He was unhappy at Charterhouse, although he enjoyed seeing plays put on by visiting actors, and he played the violin in the school orchestra. While he was there, his family moved from Hanwell to a house behind All Souls Church in Langham Place.

In 1881 Dickinson went up to King's College, Cambridge, as an exhibitioner, where his brother, Arthur, had again preceded him. Near the end of his first year, he received a telegram informing him that his mother had died from asthma. During his college years, his tutor, Oscar Browning, was a strong influence on him, and Dickinson became a close friend of his fellow King's undergraduate C. R. Ashbee. Dickinson won the chancellor's English medal in 1884 for a poem on Savonarola, and in graduating that summer he was awarded a first-class degree in the Classical Tripos.

After travelling in the Netherlands and Germany, Dickinson returned to Cambridge late that year and was elected to the Cambridge Conversazione Society, better known as the Cambridge Apostles. In a year or two he was part of the circle that included Roger Fry, J. M. E. McTaggart, and Nathaniel Wedd.

=== Career ===
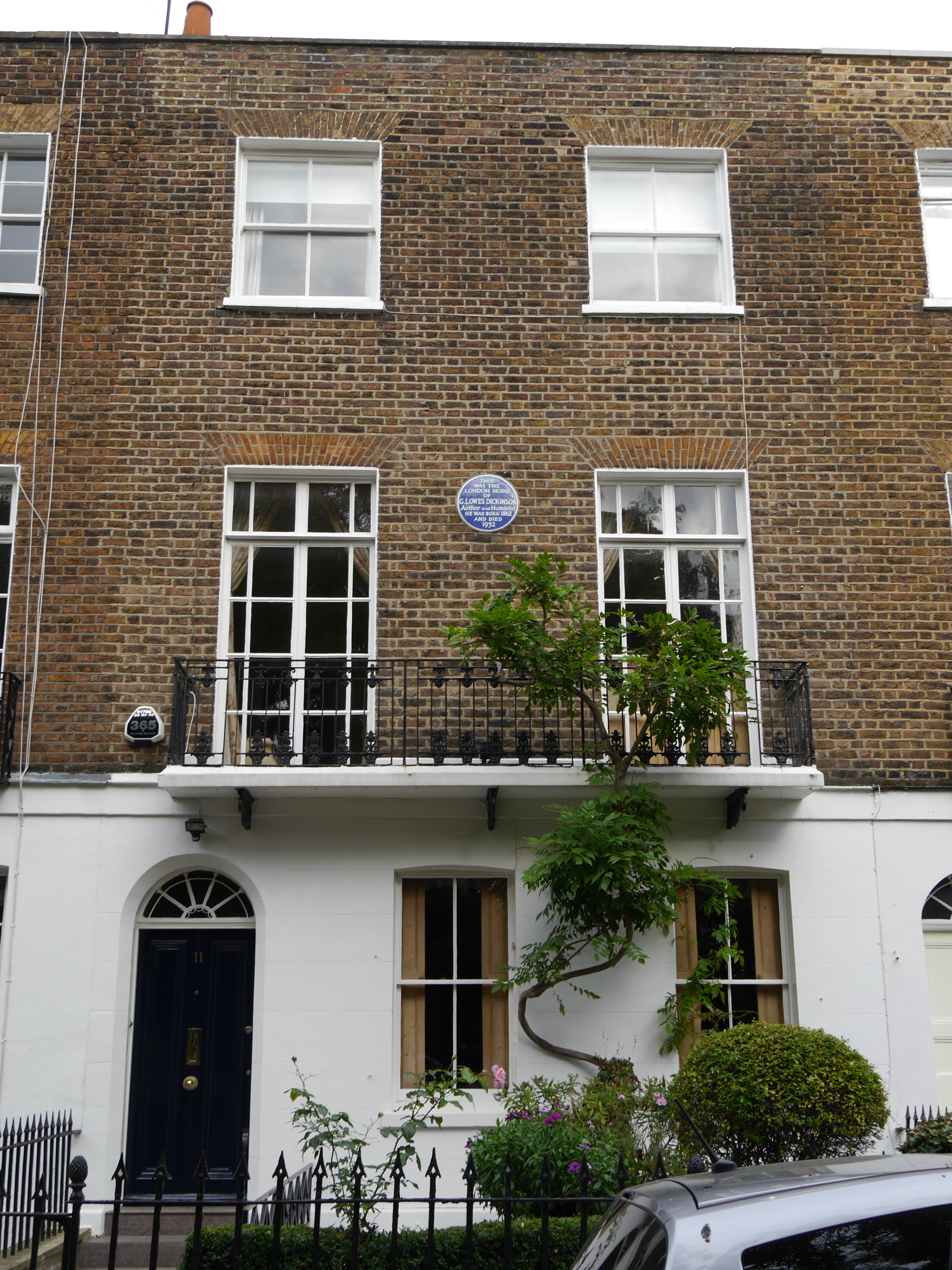
11 Edwardes Square, London W8, Dickinson's London home

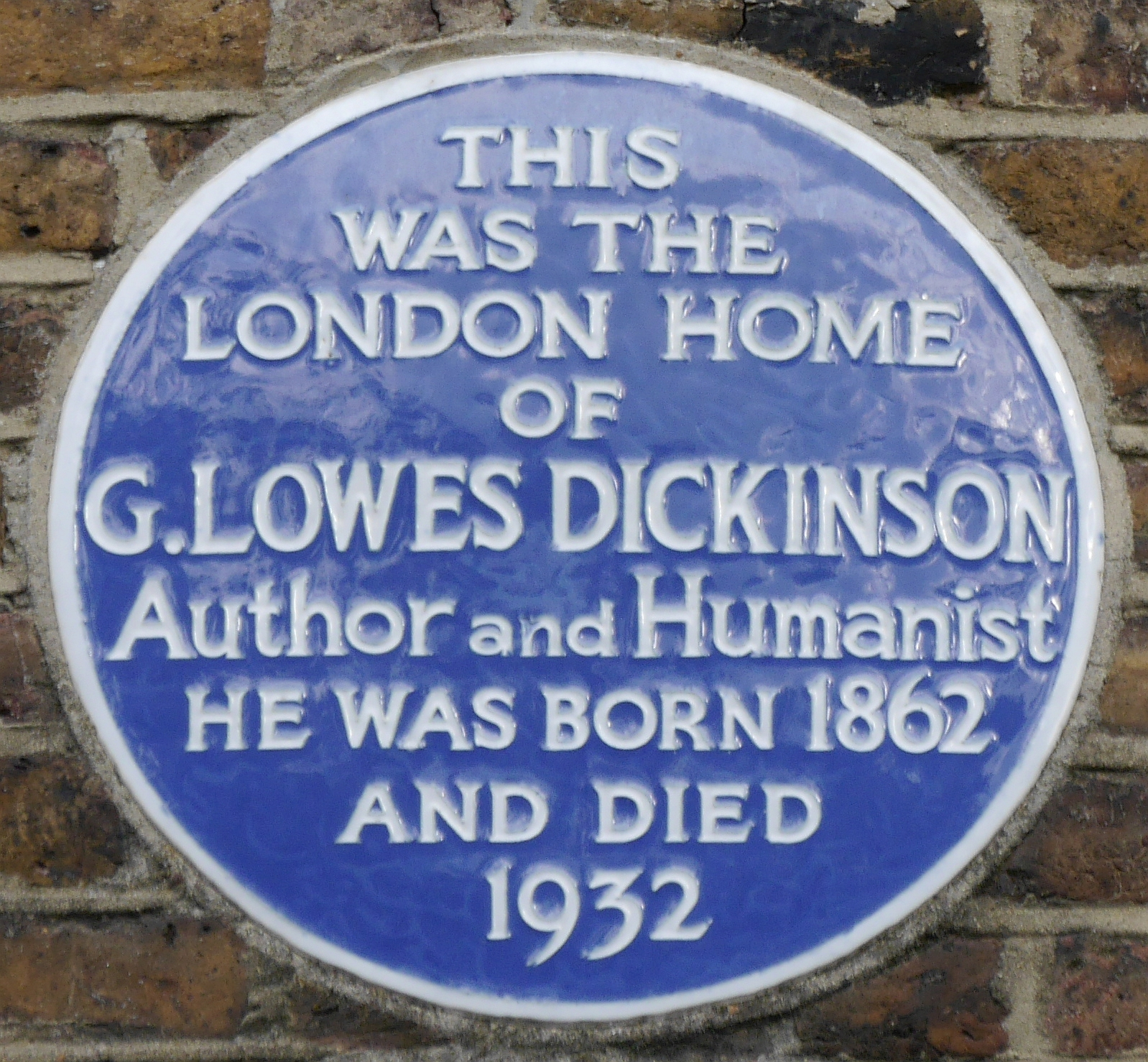
Blue plaque

In the summer of 1885, he worked at a co-operative farm, Craig Farm at Tilford near Farnham in Surrey. The farm had been started by Harold Cox as an experiment in simple living. Dickinson was proud of his hoeing, digging, and ploughing. That autumn, and continuing to the spring of 1886, Dickinson joined the University Extension Scheme to give public lectures that covered Carlyle, Emerson, Browning, and Tennyson. He toured the country, living for a term at Mansfield and for a second term at Chester and Southport. He spent a brief time in Wales afterwards.

With financial help from his father, Dickinson then began to study for a medical degree, beginning in October 1886 at Cambridge. Although he became dissatisfied with his new subject and nearly decided to drop out, he persevered and passed his M.B. examinations in 1887 and 1888. Yet he finally decided he was not interested in a career in medicine.

In March 1887 a dissertation on Plotinus helped his election to a fellowship at King's College. During Roger Fry's last year at Cambridge (1887–1888), Dickinson, a homosexual, fell in love with him. After an initially intense relationship (which according to Dickinson's biography did not include sex with Fry, a heterosexual), the two established a long friendship. Through Fry, Dickinson soon met Jack McTaggart and F. C. S. Schiller.

Dickinson then settled down at Cambridge, although he again lectured through the University Extension Scheme, travelling to Newcastle, Leicester, and Norwich. His fellowship at King's College (as a historian) was permanently renewed in 1896. That year his book The Greek View of Life was published. He later wrote a number of dialogues in the Socratic tradition.

Dickinson did not live the detached life of a stereotypical Cambridge academic. When G. K. Chesterton chose contemporary thinkers with whom he disagreed for his book Heretics (1905), the focus of Chapter 12 was "Paganism and Mr. Lowes Dickinson". There Chesterton writes:

Mr. Lowes Dickinson, the most pregnant and provocative of recent writers on this and similar subjects, is far too solid a man to have fallen into this old error of the mere anarchy of Paganism. To make hay of that Hellenic enthusiasm which has as its ideal mere appetite and egotism, it is not necessary to know much philosophy, but merely to know a little Greek. Mr. Lowes Dickinson knows a great deal of philosophy, and also a great deal of Greek, and his error, if error he has, is not that of the crude hedonist. But the contrast which he offers between Christianity and Paganism in the matter of moral ideals—a contrast which he states very ably in a paper called "How Long Halt Ye?" which appeared in the Independent Review—does, I think, contain an error of a deeper kind.

Dickinson was a lecturer in political science from 1886 to his retirement in 1920, and the college librarian from 1893 to 1896. Dickinson helped establish the Economics and Politics Tripos and taught political science within the University. For 15 years he also lectured at the London School of Economics.

In 1897 he made his first trip to Greece, travelling with Nathaniel Wedd, Robin Mayor, and A. M. Daniel.

He joined the Society for Psychical Research in 1890, and served on its Council from 1904 to 1920.

In 1903 he helped to found the Independent Review. Edward Jenks was editor, and members of its editorial board included Dickinson, F. W. Hirst, C. F. G. Masterman, G. M. Trevelyan, and Nathaniel Wedd. Fry designed the front cover. Over the years Dickinson contributed a number of articles to it, some later reprinted in Religion: A Criticism and a Forecast (1905) and Religion and Immortality (1911).

=== First World War and after ===
Within a fortnight of the start of the First World War, Dickinson had drafted schemes for a "League of Nations", and together with Lord Dickinson and Lord Bryce he planned the ideas behind of the League of Nations and played a leading role in the founding of the group of internationalist pacifists known as the Bryce Group. The organisation eventually became the nucleus of the League of Nations Union. In his pamphlet After the War (1915) he wrote of his "League of Peace" as being essentially an organisation for arbitration and conciliation. He felt that the secret diplomacy of the early twentieth century had brought about war and thus could write that, "the impossibility of war, I believe, would be increased in proportion as the issues of foreign policy should be known to and controlled by public opinion." Dickinson promoted his ideas with a large number of books and pamphlets, including his book The International Anarchy. He also attended a pacifist conference in The Hague in 1915, and in 1916 he set off on a lecture tour of the United States promoting the idea of a League of Nations.

In the 1920s, Dickinson joined the Labour Party, and he was appointed to the party's Advisory Committee on International Questions. In 1929, the Talks Department of the BBC invited him to give the first and last lectures in a series called "Points of View". He went on to give several series of BBC talks on various topics, including Goethe and Plato.

=== Death and legacy ===
After a prostate operation in 1932, Dickinson appeared to be recovering, but he died on 3 August. Memorial services were held in King's College Chapel, Cambridge, and in London.

E. M. Forster, by then a good friend, who had been influenced by Dickinson's books, accepted the appointment as Dickinson's literary executor. Dickinson's sisters then asked Forster to write their brother's biography, which was published as Goldsworthy Lowes Dickinson in 1934. Forster has been criticised for refraining from publishing details of Dickinson's sexual proclivities, including his foot fetishism and unrequited love for young men.

E. M. Forster stated (in "the Art of Fiction") that he used Dickinsons' sisters as his inspiration for Margaret and Helen Schlegel, the central characters in Howards End.

== Works ==
- Revolution and Reaction in Modern France, 1892
- The Development of Parliament during the Nineteenth Century, 1895
- The Greek View of Life, 1896, 1909
- Letters from John Chinaman and Other Essays, 1901
- The Meaning of Good: A Dialogue, 1901
- Letters from a Chinese Official; Being an Eastern View of Western Civilization, 1903 (published anonymously)
- Religion. A Criticism and a Forecast, 1905
- A Modern Symposium, 1905
- From King To King, 1907
- Justice and Liberty: A Political Dialogue, 1908
- Is Immortality Desirable?, 1909
- Religion and Immortality, 1911
- An Essay on the Civilisations of India, China & Japan, 1914
- Appearances; Being Notes of Travel, 1914
- After the War, 1915
- The European Anarchy, 1916
- The Choice Before Us, 1917
- The War and the Way Out, 1917
- Causes of International War, 1920
- The Magic Flute: A Fantasia, 1920; Dickinson, Goldsworthy Lowes (1923). 1923 reprint.
- War: Its Nature, Cause and Cure, 1923
- The International Anarchy, 1904–1918, 1926
- After Two Thousand Years: A Dialogue between Plato and a Modern Young Man, 1930
- Plato and His Dialogues, 1931
- J. McT. E. McTaggart, 1931, 'With chapters by Basil Williams & S.V. Keeling' (Cambridge)
- The Contribution of Ancient Greece to Modern Life, 1932

Posthumous:

- The Autobiography of G. Lowes Dickinson: and other unpublished writings, 1973, edited by Dennis Proctor, published by Duckworth, 287 pages, ISBN 0-7156-0647-6 (hardcover)
