= Margery Spring Rice =

English social reformer (1887–1970)

- Born: Margaret Lois Garrett; 10 June 1887; London
- Died: 21 April 1970 (aged 82); Aldeburgh, Suffolk

Margery Spring Rice (10 June 1887 – 21 April 1970) was an English social reformer. She was Secretary of the League of Nations Society and a founding member of the National Birth Control Association (later Family Planning Association). She authored the book Working-Class Wives: Their Health and Conditions in 1939.

== Early life ==
Spring Rice was born in London, the daughter of Clara Thornbury and Samuel Garrett (solicitor and president of the Law Society). She was niece to Dr. Elizabeth Garrett Anderson and Dame Millicent Garrett Fawcett.

Spring Rice studied at Bedford College before reading Moral Sciences at Girton College, Cambridge, from 1907 to 1910. She subsequently trained as a factory inspector. In April 1911, she married Captain Charles Edward Coursolles Jones, who was killed in 1916 at the Battle of the Somme. The couple had two sons, Ronald and Charles Garrett-Jones.

In 1919, she married financier (Edward) Dominick Spring Rice, with whom she had two children, Stephen and (Theodosia) Cecil. Edward and Margery divorced in 1936. Her son Stephen died, on Christmas Day 1942, while serving in a submarine in the Mediterranean.

After World War I, Spring Rice became involved with the inception of the League of Nations working as first Secretary to the League of Nations Society (later to become part of the League of Nations Union). Between 1922 and 1927 she served as honorary treasurer of the Women's National Liberal Federation.

== Women's health ==
In 1924 Spring Rice became involved with the issues of poverty and access to birth control within the borough of North Kensington through the instigation of a friend Margaret Pyke (then Pollock). Spring Rice would set up and become chair of the North Kensington birth control clinic (later North Kensington Women's Welfare Centre). Using her contacts at the Women's National Liberal Federation, Spring Rice convinced Lady Gertrude Denman in 1930 to become the founding chair of the National Birth Control Association (later Family Planning Association). Spring Rice would serve on the executive body until 1958

In 1933, Spring Rice became a member of the Women's Health Enquiry Committee which collected a survey of 1250 married working women. Spring Rice would use this information as the basis for her 1939 book Working-Class Wives: Their Health and Conditions. This work drew attention to the widespread poverty and poor health experienced by many women, much of it due to repeated pregnancies, miscarriages, and minor gynaecological problems.

== Later life ==
During World War II, she ran a residential nursery for pre-school children evacuated from London at her home in the village of Iken on the Alde Estuary, close to Aldeburgh. She became a founder member of the Aldeburgh Festival, providing financial support in the early years of the Festival. Her home, Iken Hall, was the location of Benjamin Britten's The Little Sweep, part of his Let's Make an Opera of 1949. After the Second World War she founded the Suffolk Rural Music School in memory of her son Stephen.

Spring Rice spent the 1950s continuing to develop family planning services, particularly in Suffolk where she helped to establish several clinics, including one in Ipswich to which she became chairman.

Spring Rice died at Aldeburgh Cottage Hospital in April 1970.
