= Nathaniel Wedd =

British academic and historian, 1864–1940

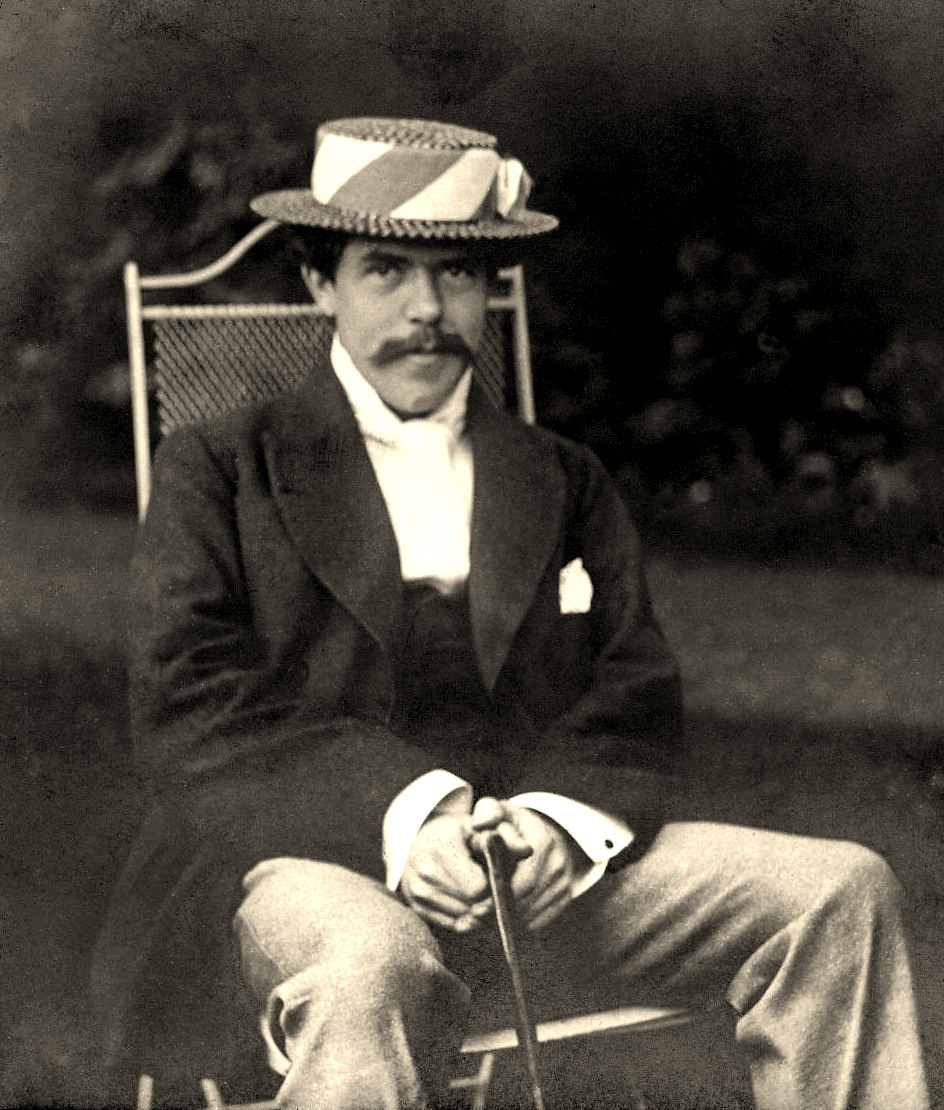
- Born: 10 April 1864; Northumberland
- Died: 27 September 1940 (aged 76); Herefordshire
- Education: City of London School, King's College, Cambridge
- Occupations: Historian, lecturer, tutor
- Organization(s): Cambridge Apostles, South Place Ethical Society
- Spouse: Rachel Evelyn White

Nathaniel Wedd (10 April 1864 – 27 September 1940) was a historian, lecturer, tutor, and a noted influence on E. M. Forster. Like Forster, he was a humanist, who attended South Place Ethical Society and admired the freethinking Moncure D. Conway.

== Life ==
Nathaniel Wedd was born in Northumberland in 1864, though he was raised in London. His father died while Wedd was still young, so he was principally raised by his mother. Both of his parents were freethinkers, and encouraged this in Wedd. From the City of London School, he went up to King's College, Cambridge in 1883. There, he excelled, taking firsts in both parts of the classical tripos, and was made a Fellow of King's in 1888.

Wedd's contemporaries at Cambridge included Goldsworthy Lowes Dickinson, E. M. Forster, and Oscar Browning. Wedd was a member of the Cambridge Apostles, a secret society, alongside Roger Fry and J. M. E. McTaggart. Wedd was highly regarded as an inspirational teacher and a devoted scholar, who put his own intellect at the service of others. Publishing little of his own besides a translation of Euripides' Orestes, he is credited with playing a significant role in the reinvigoration of classics at Cambridge during his time there, and - with Goldsworthy Lowes Dickinson - fostering 'the atmosphere of inspiration and individuality that dominated the college at the turn of the century'.

Wedd was 'the decisive influence' on the young E.M. Forster. Forster himself wrote that it was 'to him rather than to Dickinson - indeed to him more than to anyone - that I owe such an awakening as has befallen me.' He later recalled:

Wedd... helped me by remarking in a lecture that we all know more than we think. A cry of relief and endorsement arose from my mind, tortured so long by being told that it knows less than it pretended to know.

Wedd was his classics tutor, and imbued a love for Greece and for the classics, as well as with his own social and political ideals, that stayed with Forster. As a character, Wedd was fondly described by his contemporaries, and by subsequent biographers of them. He was noted for possessing the:

gift of winning the confidence of the most reserved....He understood undergraduates of all kinds and cared to see only their merits, of which he was always the first and sometimes the only discoverer; and once he knew his man, he knew exactly how best to help and stimulate him.

In 1903, a group that included Wedd, Dickinson, and G. M. Trevelyan founded The Independent Review, in Forster's words, 'to advocate sanity in foreign affairs and a constructive policy at home. It was not so much a Liberal Review as an appeal to Liberalism from the left to be its better self.'

In 1906, Wedd married Rachel Evelyn White (1867-1943). White had been educated at the Collegiate School in Aberdeen, followed by University College, Dundee, and Newnham College, Cambridge. She taught classics at Newnham until December 1906.

In his biography of Forster, Wilfred Stone describes Wedd as 'openly and scandalously anti-God,' this facet of his character providing 'some amusing bits of King's folklore':

To complaints about his playing croquet on Sundays, he replied, "I deplore a faith so fragile that it can't survive the click of croquet balls heard on the way to Chapel."

Upon finding the South Place Institute in Finsbury, Wedd wrote admiringly of the American Moncure Conway, and the freethinking and inclusive atmosphere of South Place:

There, the appeal was to reason solely, to reasonableness, to humanity. Instead of lessons from the Prayer-book or chapters from the Bible, he read passages from Plato, from Positive philosophy, from Buddhist writers, from Confucius and Zoroaster, from Hindu philosophers... The effect of attending South Place Institute was that I became a strong partisan of the Cause of Freedom of Thought, and a correspondingly strong opponent of organised religion as an institution for limiting freedom.

Wedd died in Hereford at the age of 76, on 27 September 1940. He was described in his obituary in The Times as serving King's College 'down to the last weeks of his life... with his whole heart and rare gifts of mind and spirit.' It described his 'genius for teaching', as well as his being 'something of a firebrand':

... indeed throughout his life his wit, his vigorous independence, and his fine audacity of language, always used in the service of his quickening sympathy with youth, made him provocative as well as stimulating, a kindler of live sparks in many stubbles.
