= Bryce Group =

The Bryce Group was a loose organisation of British Liberal Party members which was devoted to studying international organisation. The organization was the first to fully flesh out a blueprint for a League of Nations and organize a popular movement around establishing the League.

The group was founded in 1914 by Goldsworthy Lowes Dickinson, and some of its early meetings were attended by Viscount Bryce. Bryce chaired the Committee on Alleged German Outrages, and its 1915 report, popularly known as the "Bryce Report", became the focus of much of the group's work.

The group concluded that, to minimise future atrocities, nations should agree on a binding treaty, which would compel them to take disputes to arbitration, and provide sanctions against both signatories and non-signatories, to compel them to accept this arbitration. Some group members disagreed with these conclusions; for example, Arthur Ponsonby objected to all use of force, while John A. Hobson believed that any international organisation would be ineffective unless it had the power to reduce international inequalities.

While the Bryce Group was small, it proved highly influential, as through its links with the League to Enforce Peace it influenced Woodrow Wilson's thinking. Late in 1915, the group merged into the Fabian Society Research Committee, and thereby its proposal became a key part of Labour Party international policy.

Membership of the group overlapped with that of the League of Nations Society, and also the 1917 Club. Over the next decade, most of its members joined the Labour Party.
