= Latin America and the League of Nations =

Nine Latin American nations became charter members of the League of Nations when it was founded in 1919. The number grew to fifteen states by the time the first League Assembly met in 1920 and later, several others joined in the decade that followed. Although only Brazil had any participation in World War I (and a minor role at that), these nations supported the idealistic principles of the League and felt it offered some measure of juridical protection from the interventionist policies of the United States before the proclamation of the non-interventionist Good Neighbor Policy by Franklin D. Roosevelt in 1933. Latin American nations also felt that being members of the League would bring prestige and notoriety to Latin America. All twenty Latin American countries were members of the League at one point, yet they were never all members at the same time.

To guarantee Latin American representatives in the Assembly and Council, an unofficial bloc was established early on. This movement, in turn led to the creation of a special Latin American Liaison Bureau. Latin American delegates emphasized their contributions and hopes for world peace which eventually would anticipate their actions in the United Nations.

The Latin American nations became increasingly disillusioned with the League in the 1920s. This was partly due to the failure of the United States to join the League, and partly because the major powers in the League paid little attention to Latin America's problems. The League did have some role in two conflicts in South America in the 1930s: the Leticia dispute between Colombia and Peru, and the Chaco War between Bolivia and Paraguay.

While Latin American delegates were frequently frustrated with the political institutions of the League, they participated avidly in the so-called "technical" bodies. In the field of intellectual cooperation, for instance, they introduced a number of initiatives – such as translation into French of major Latin American literary works, or the elaboration of a history of the Americas – that became hallmarks of cultural internationalism. Also in the field of public health and nutrition there were productive exchanges between Geneva and Latin American actors.
