= Ben Salmon =

American Christian pacifist, conscientious objector, and critic

Benjamin Joseph Salmon
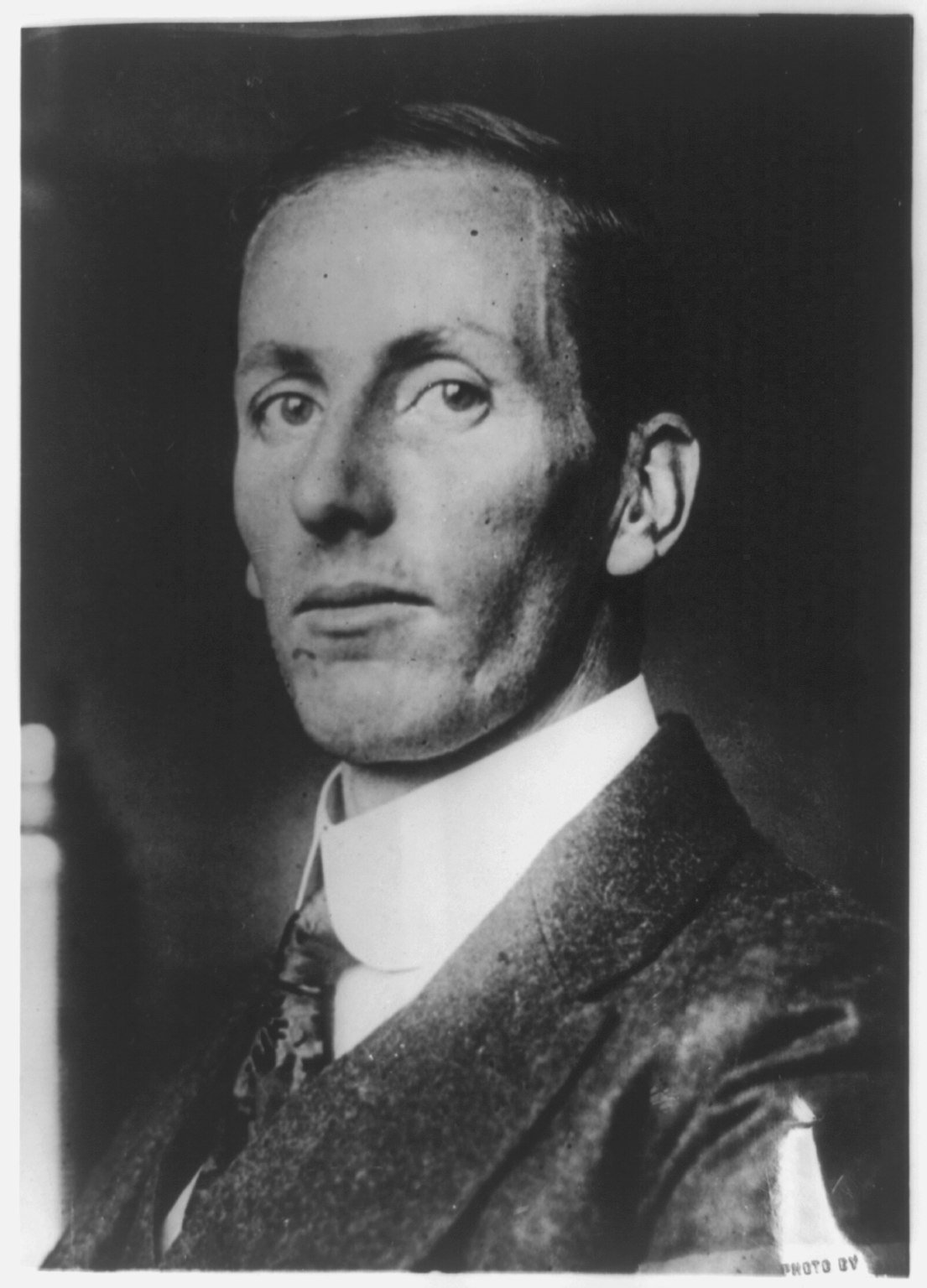
- Salmon in 1920
- Born: October 15, 1888; Denver, Colorado
- Died: February 15, 1932 (aged 43); Chicago, Illinois
- Education: High school
- Spouse: Elizabeth Smith
- Children: Charles, Margaret, Geraldine, John Paul
- Parent(s): Michael Andrew Anthony Salmon, Catherine Cecilia Reardon

Benjamin Joseph Salmon (October 15, 1888 – February 15, 1932) was an American Christian pacifist, Roman Catholic, conscientious objector and outspoken critic of just war theory. Salmon believed no war could be morally justified.

== Biography ==
Salmon was born and raised in a working-class Catholic family, and became an office clerk with the Colorado and Southern Railroad. Outraged by the Ludlow Massacre, he became more active in populist causes such as unionism and the single tax. When President Woodrow Wilson ordered a draft, Salmon was one of a number of Americans to refuse to cooperate. On June 5, 1917, Salmon wrote in a letter to President Wilson:

Regardless of nationality, all men are brothers. God is "our Father who art in heaven." The commandment "Thou shalt not kill" is unconditional and inexorable.... The lowly Nazarene taught us the doctrine of non-resistance, and so convinced was he of the soundness of that doctrine that he sealed his belief with death on the cross. When human law conflicts with Divine law, my duty is clear. Conscience, my infallible guide, impels me to tell you that prison, death, or both, are infinitely preferable to joining any branch of the Army.

Salmon was arrested in January 1918 for refusing to complete a Selective Service questionnaire. While out on bail, he was re-arrested for refusing to report for induction. He was locked in the guardhouse for refusing to wear uniform and forced to work in the yard. Despite not having been inducted, he was court-martialed at Camp Dodge, Iowa on July 24, 1918, charged with desertion and spreading propaganda. Salmon was sentenced to 25 years in prison with hard labor. He arrived at Fort Leavenworth on October 9, 1918, to start his sentence, just one month before World War I ended on November 11, 1918. He began a hunger strike "for liberty or death" on July 13, 1920. The government claimed that his fast was a symptom of mental illness and sent him to a ward reserved for the "criminally insane" at St. Elizabeths Hospital in Washington, D.C., on July 31, 1920.

The fledgling American Civil Liberties Union (ACLU) eventually took up his case and post-war public opinion favored the release of conscientious objectors. Salmon was pardoned and released along with 32 others on November 26, 1920, Thanksgiving Day, and given a dishonorable discharge from the military service he had never joined.

Upon his release, Salmon led a quiet life with his family, but his prison ordeal, which included beatings and force-feedings, had permanently damaged his health. He died of pneumonia in 1932.

== Opposition to "just war" theory ==
Either Christ is a liar or war is never necessary.

— Ben Salmon, A Critique of Just War Doctrine, p.86

Salmon based his pacifism partly on political analysis and humanitarian principles, but also on religious principle derived from his Catholicism. That put him at odds with the leadership of the Catholic Church. Traditional Catholic doctrine advanced the Just war theory. Archbishop James Gibbons, de facto head of the Catholic Church in the United States, had directed that all Catholics were to support the war. The majority of Catholic Bishops supported President Wilson, citing the just war teaching of the Church, and Cardinal John Farley of New York remarked in 1918 that "criticism of the government irritates me. I consider it little short of treason... Every citizen of this nation, no matter what his private opinion or his political leanings, should support the President and his advisers to the limit of his ability."

Salmon explained his objections to just war theory in a hand-written 200-page manuscript produced during his time in St. Elizabeths Hospital. His only reference tools were a Bible and the Catholic Encyclopedia. He cited Christ's blessing of the merciful (Matthew 5:7) and the peacemakers (Matthew 5:9). He noted that Jesus said "Do not murder" (Matthew 19:18). He declared there was no such thing as a just war and urged Christians to "listen to the voice of Christ echoed from the pages of the New Testament."

Salmon's position was so offensive to others in the Catholic Church that some priests refused him the Sacraments even when he was sick and in prison.

Decades later, Catholic peace activists, including Fathers Daniel Berrigan and John Dear, cited Salmon as an inspiration for their anti-war beliefs.

== See also ==
- Christian anarchism
