= League of Nations Society =

Political group

The League of Nations Society was a political group devoted to campaigning for an international organisation of nations, with the aim of preventing war.

The society was founded in 1915 by Baron Courtney and Willoughby Dickinson, both members of the British Liberal Party, and Baron Parmoor, a member of the Conservative Party. The group campaigned for the establishment of the League of Nations, its interest mostly motivated by pacifism, and opposition to World War I.

The society was influenced by the proposals of the Bryce Group, and many of that group's members also held membership of the society. However, it differed from the Bryce Group in proposing that the future international league should be able to impose sanctions in order to enforce arbitration decisions, not just to compel nations to take disputes into arbitration.

The society grew quickly, appointing Margery Spring Rice as its secretary, and within a couple of years had several thousand members. By 1917, Woodrow Wilson supported the principle of a League of Nations, and less radical supporters of the idea formed the League of Free Nations Association. In 1918, the two organisations merged, forming the League of Nations Union.
