= 1919 in art =

Events from the year 1919 in art.

== Events ==
- January–June – Paris Peace Conference at Versailles; Sir William Orpen attends as British official artist and Noël Dorville as a French journalist-illustrator.
- April 15 – Publication in England of W. Somerset Maugham's novel The Moon and Sixpence, loosely based on the life of Paul Gauguin.
- April 25 – The Bauhaus architectural and design movement is founded in Weimar, Germany, by Walter Gropius.
- May 5 – The Royal Academy Exhibition of 1919 opens at Burlington House in London
- December – The National War Paintings and Other Records exhibition staged at the Royal Academy of Arts in London.
- Seven and Five Society established in London.
- Piet Mondrian, in Paris, begins painting his grid-based compositions (Neo-Plasticism).
- The first bronze castings from Degas sculptures are made, posthumously.
- Musée Rodin opens in Paris at the Hôtel Biron and Villa des Brillants, Meudon.
- Chaïm Soutine first visits Céret in the Pyrenees where he begins a series of landscapes.
- Les Champs Magnétiques, the first book produced using the techniques of surrealist automatism, is written by André Breton and Philippe Soupault.

== Works ==
John Singer Sargent – Gassed

- Norman G. Arnold – The Last Fight of Captain Ball, VC, DSO and 2 Bars, MC, 7th May 1917
- Max Beckmann – The Night
- George Bellows – Tennis at Newport
- David Bomberg – Sappers at Work: A Canadian Tunnelling Company, Hill 60, St Eloi
- John Arnesby Brown – The Line of the Plough
- Sydney Carline
  - Flying Above Kirkuk, Kurdistan
  - Flying Over the Desert at Sunset, Mesopotamia
  - The Trail of War
- Harry Clarke – illustrations to Tales of Mystery & Imagination
- Dorothy Coke – War Allotments in a London Suburb
- Philip Connard
  - The Guns of HMS 'Caesar' 1919 – Off Constantinople, looking towards the Golden Horn
  - The Port of Constantinople – The Guns of HMS 'Caesar'
- Leonard Crunelle – Statue of Richard J. Oglesby
- Evelyn De Morgan – The Gilded Cage
- Marcel Duchamp – L.H.O.O.Q.
- Aleksandra Ekster – City at Night
- Jacob Epstein – Sergeant D. F. Hunter VC, 1/5 Highland Light Infantry (bronze bust)
- Max Ernst
  - Aquis Submersus
  - Trophy, Hypertrophied (line-block printing and drawing)
- Luke Fildes – Paul Fildes
- Stanhope Forbes – Fitting Out, Mousehole Harbour
- Elsa von Freytag-Loringhoven – Portrait of Marcel Duchamp (sculpture of found objects)
- Colin Gill
  - Evening, After a Push
  - Heavy Artillery
  - Observation of Fire
- Eileen Gray – "Dragons" armchair
- Elioth Gruner – Spring Frost
- Childe Hassam – The Avenue in the Rain
- Hannah Höch – Schnitt mit dem Küchenmesser DADA durch die letzte weimarer Bierbauchkulturepoche Deutschlands ("Cut with the Dada Kitchen Knife through the Last Weimar Beer-Belly Cultural Epoch in Germany"; collage)
- Augustus John – Marchesa Casati
- Lucy Kemp-Welch – The Straw Ride
- Henry Lamb – Irish troops in the Judean hills surprised by a Turkish bombardment
- Fernand Léger
  - The City
  - The Railway Crossing
- Ivor Lewis – Timothy Eaton statues
- Wyndham Lewis – A Battery Shelled
- David Low – Strange, I seem to hear a child weeping (political cartoon)
- Hermon Atkins MacNeil – Statue of Ezra Cornell
- Albert Marquet – La femme blonde (Femme blonde sur un fond de châle espagnol)
- Henri Matisse – Les plumes blanches ("White Plumes")
- Claude Monet – paintings in Water Lilies series
  - Le Bassin Aux Nymphéas
  - Water Lilies
- Edvard Munch – Self-Portrait with the Spanish Flu
- Paul Nash – The Menin Road
- C. R. W. Nevinson – The Harvest of Battle
- Georgia O'Keeffe – Red and Orange Streak
- Sir William Orpen
  - A Peace Conference at the Quai d'Orsay
  - The Signing of Peace in the Hall of Mirrors, Versailles, 28th June 1919
- Pablo Picasso
  - Le Tricorne
  - Still Life with Pitcher and Apples
- John Singer Sargent – Gassed
- Zinaida Serebriakova – House of Cards
- Charles Sims – The Old German Front Line, Arras, 1916
- Stanley Spencer – Travoys with Wounded Soldiers Arriving at a Dressing Station at Smol, Macedonia, September 1916
- Edward Wadsworth – Dazzle-ships in Drydock at Liverpool

== Births ==
=== January to June ===
- January 5 – Frederick Hammersley, American painter (d. 2009)
- January 9 – Henrietta Berk, American painter (d. 1990)
- January 19 – Joan Brossa, Catalan poet, playwright, graphic designer and plastic artist (d. 1998)
- January 22 – John Russell, British American art critic (d. 2008)
- January 24 – William Copley, American artist (d. 1996)
- March 23 – Salvatore Scarpitta, American sculptor (d. 2007)
- April 9 – Gordon Lambert, Irish art collector (d. 2005)
- April 24 – César Manrique, Spanish artist and architect (d. 1992)
- May 3 – John Cullen Murphy, American comics artist (d. 2004)
- May 9 – Anne Yeats, Irish painter and stage designer (d. 2001)
- May 27 – Emvin Cremona, Maltese artist (d. 1987)
- June 2 – Nat Mayer Shapiro, American painter (d. 2005)
- June 7 – Mira Schendel, born Myrrha Dub, Swiss-Brazilian modernist artist and poet (d. 1988)
- June 18 – Gordon A. Smith, Canadian artist and teacher (d. 2020)
- June 21 – Jean Joyet, French artist (d. 1994)

=== July to December ===
- July 6 – Oswaldo Guayasamín, Ecuadorian painter and sculptor (d. 1999)
- July 17 – Jean Leymarie, French art historian (d. 2006)
- July 18 – Daniel du Janerand, French painter (d. 1990)
- July 31 – Maurice Boitel, French painter (d. 2007)
- September 8 – Maria Lassnig, Austrian painter (d. 2014)
- September 29 – Vladimír Vašíček, Czech painter (d. 2003)
- November 3 – Jesús Blasco, Spanish comic books author and artist (d. 1995)
- December 12 – Cliff Holden, English painter, designer and silk-screen printer (d. 2020)
- December 24 – Pierre Soulages, French "painter of black" (d. 2022)

=== Full date unknown ===
- Avni Arbaş, Turkish artist (d. 2003)

== Deaths ==
- January 22 – Carl Larsson, Swedish painter (b. 1853)
- February 18 – Antonin Carlès, French sculptor (b. 1851)
- February 27 – Robert Harris, Canadian painter (b. 1848)
- March 24 – Franz Metzner, German sculptor (b. 1870)
- March 25 – Wilhelm Lehmbruck, German sculptor (b. 1881) (suicide)
- May 2 – Evelyn De Morgan, English painter (born 1855)
- May 13 – Helen Hyde, American etcher and engraver (b. 1868)
- August 9 – Ralph Albert Blakelock, American painter (b. 1847)
- November 18 – John Dibblee Crace, British interior decorator (b. 1838)
- December 2 – Henry Clay Frick, American founder of the Frick Collection (b. 1849)
- December 3 – Pierre-Auguste Renoir, French Impressionist painter (b. 1841)
- December 18 – James Coutts Michie, Scottish painter b. 1859)
- Full date unknown – Edmund Elisha Case, American painter (b 1844)
