= Gaëtan de Rosnay =

French painter (1912–1992)

Gaëtan de Rosnay (17 May 1912 – 19 October 1992) was a French painter born and raised in Mauritius, he belonged to the art movement called "La Jeune Peinture" ("young picture") of the School of Paris, with painters like Bernard Buffet, Yves Brayer, Louis Vuillermoz, Pierre-Henry, Daniel du Janerand, Maurice Boitel, Gaston Sébire, Paul Collomb, Jean Monneret, Maurice Verdier.

From his Russian spouse Natalia, née Koltchine, he was the father of Zina, Joël (biologist and writer) and Arnaud (1946–1984).
