= Jean Joyet =

French painter

Jean Joyet (21 June 1919 – 14 April 1994) was a French painter of the School of Paris, born in Saint Victurnien.

He was married to the painter Marcelle Deloron. Joyet was linked to other painters of the "Young Picture of the School of Paris" and chiefly to Louis Vuillermoz, Jean-Pierre Alaux and Maurice Boitel, in the group of whom he was invited in the Salon "Comparaisons" with Paul Collomb, Noe Canjura, Daniel du Janerand, Louis Vuillermoz, and André Vignolles.

The city of Paris and the French State bought some of his works. He died in 1994.
