= Maurice Boitel =

French painter (1919–2007)

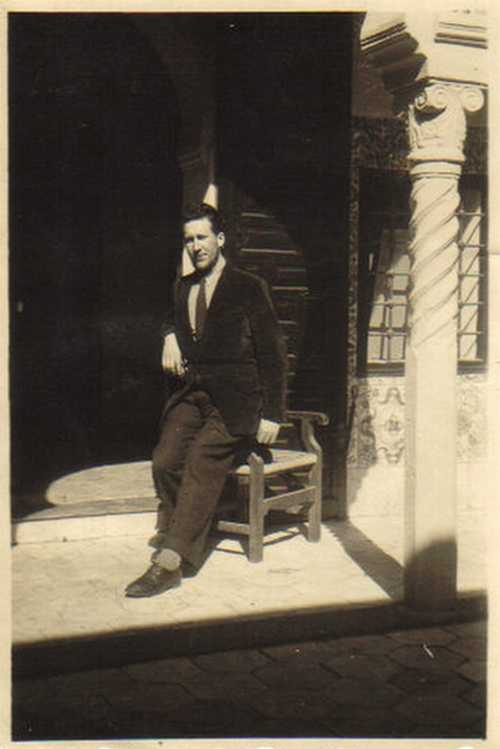
Maurice Boitel in 1946

Maurice Boitel (July 31, 1919 – August 11, 2007) was a French painter.

== Artistic life ==
Boitel belonged to the art movement called "La Jeune Peinture" ("Young Picture") of the School of Paris, with painters like Bernard Buffet, Yves Brayer, Jansem, Jean Carzou, Louis Vuillermoz, Pierre-Henry, Daniel du Janerand, Gaston Sébire, Paul Collomb, Jean Monneret, Jean Joyet and Gaëtan de Rosnay.

=== A precocious vocation ===
He was born in Tillières-sur-Avre, Eure département, in Normandy, from a Picard lawyer father, a member of the Saint Francis third order, and from a Parisian mother, of Burgundian ancestry. Until the age of twelve Maurice Boitel lived in Burgundy at Gevrey-Chambertin. In this beautiful province his art reflected his major love of nature, and also the feeling of joie de vivre expressed in his works. He began drawing at the age of five.

=== Fine arts studies ===
Boitel studied at the Fine Arts schools of Boulogne-sur-Mer and of Amiens, cities where his parents lived for a few years. Then his family came back to Burgundy, to Nuits-Saint-Georges. He studied at the Fine Arts Academy of Dijon before fighting in a mountain light infantry platoon at the beginning of World War II.

He successfully sat the competitive examination to enter the National Academy of Fine Arts École nationale supérieure des Beaux-Arts (Paris). In 1942 and 1943, during the most difficult period of the German occupation, in his studio located in the center of Paris he hid Jewish refugees, among them the journalist Henry Jelinek.

A great number of his paintings from between 1942 and 1946 were bought by a British collector and are still in London.

=== Exhibitions, awards and "Salons" ===
- In 1946, he received the Abd-el-Tif prize which enabled him to remain for two years in Algiers with Marie-Lucie, his wife, and his son. On his return from Algeria he exhibited in Paris in the exhibitions of the Young Painters, Jeune Peinture, Independent Artists, Société des Artistes Indépendants, the Salon d'Automne, and after, in the Salon du dessin et de la peinture à l'eau (drawing and water painting), the Société des Artistes Français, Terre Latine (Latin land), the Salon of the National Society of Fine Arts, Société Nationale des Beaux-Arts, and with Comparisons, Salon "Comparaisons"; until 2004, he was a member of these two last Societies' Committees.
- In 1949 he presented an individual exhibition of his paintings of Algeria in the Gallery of the Elysée, rue du Faubourg Saint-Honoré (Paris), at that time the center of the European art trade.
- In 1951, new individual exhibition in this same gallery; he also took part in a group exhibition in the Suillerot Gallery and topic exhibition, chaired by the producer Jacques Hébertot, within the framework of the Association of the Amateurs of painting.
- In 1958, he received the Robert Louis Antral award from the Town of Paris, and he had simultaneously an individual exhibition in the Modern Art Museum of the Town of Paris (Palais de Chaillot) and in the Gallery Rene Drouet, rue du Faubourg Saint-Honoré (Paris), where he presented biennial individual exhibitions during twenty years.
- In 1959, he won the Winsor & Newton (Paris-London) award;
- During the fifties, he was commissioned to decorate two educational state establishments: in Montreuil-sous-Bois (Seine-Saint-Denis county ) and in Montgeron (Essonne county).
- In 1963, the Puvis de Chavannes award, decreed by the National Society of Fine Arts, enabled him to exhibit all of his works at the Museum of Modern art of Paris.
- In 1966, he received the Francis Smith award which offers a stay in Portugal (Peniche, Óbidos).
- In 1968, he received the French Artists Gold Medal and the Academy of Fine Arts decrees the Bastien Lepage Prize to him.
- In 1980, the Institute of France gave him the Dumas-Milliers award.
- Different other awards come to crown his career of painter, among which the Grand-Prix (Great award) of the General Council of Seine-et-Marne (1974), the Prize Roger Deverin watercolour decided by the Taylor Foundation (1984).
- Individual exhibitions, in the museums of the following towns: Boulogne-sur-Mer in 1976, Saint-Maur-des-Fossés in 1977, Montbard in 1982, Montreuil-sur-Mer in 1993, enabled him to present in several rooms, of the retrospectives with large tables where appear of the compositions as well as landscapes of France, Italy, Spain, Portugal, the Netherlands, etc.
- In 1990, the Salon d'Automne of Paris voted him a homage in three halls of the Grand Palais of Paris.
- In 1999, President Jean Monneret and the Committee of the Salon des Indépendants of Paris invited him to present a retrospective of his works.
- In 2003, the members of the National Society of Fine Arts (Société Nationale des Beaux-Arts) voted the Gold Medal to him.
- In 2007, the committee of the Société Nationale des Beaux-Arts created the title of Member of Honour which was given to Maurice Boitel, as one of the most famous painters of the Salon, still alive.
- In 2009, Boitel's paintings were shown in à "Art en capital" in the Grand Palais de Paris: two of Maurice Boitel' works: a watercolor in the Salon du dessin et de la peinture à l'eau, & an oil on canvas representing a factory in Crossas (Ambazac, Limousin) in the hall dedicated to the members of the Société Nationale des Beaux-Arts.
- In 2010, 26 paintings of Maurice Boitel were shown in the king-count hall of the castle-museum of Boulogne-sur-Mer with six paintings of his friends among whom Bernard Buffet in May; 12 paintings in the Patio of the council hall of Saint-Mandé (surrounding of Paris) in September; 2 paintings in the Grand Palais de Paris in November; one painting in the Carrousel du Louvre (Paris) in December, organized by the Société Nationale des Beaux-Arts.
- In 2011, he exhibited in the museum of Nuits-Saint-Georges (capital of the wine of Burgundy).

He was the guest of honor in several exhibitions of painting like: Rosny-sous-Bois (1980), Blois (1983), Wimereux (1984), Villeneuve-le-Roi (1984), Yvetot (1986), Alfortville (1987), Bourges (1987), Saumur (1987), Metz (1991), Limoges (1992), Tours (1992).

=== Friends ===
Among his closest friends were the painters Daniel du Janerand, Gabriel Deschamps, Louis Vuillermoz, Pierre-Henry, André Vignoles, Pierre Gaillardot, Rodolphe Caillaux, Jean-Pierre Alaux, Bernard Buffet, André Hambourg, Emilio Grau Sala, Jean Carzou, Paul Collomb, composer Henri Dutilleux, and the two brothers Ramon and Antoni Pitxot.

Family links: Henri Corblin (Corblin Burton), Albert Besson (Académie de Médecine), Olivier Lazzarotti (université d'Amiens).

== Death ==
Maurice Boitel died on August 11, 2007, in Audresselles, Pas-de-Calais.

== Legacy ==
The municipality of Paris gave its name to the walk which surrounds the lake Daumesnil in 2014 and the municipality of Audresselles in the path which lines the English Channel in 2008.

Some municipalities gave the name of Maurice Boitel to a street or a monument:

- in Paris: "Promenade Maurice Boitel" of a mile and half long, around the Daumesnil lake, Paris 12th arrondissement.
- in Paris:marble panel on the wall of the building where he had his studio: "Here lived and worked Maurice Boitel,..."
- in Audresselles (Pas-de-Calais), along the sea-side, "Maurice boitel allee".
- In Conches-sur-Gondoire (center of Marne-la-Vallée, Seine-et-Marne), along the church, "espace familial Maurice Boitel" ( familial leisure space Maurice Boitel).
- The council of Ambazac, Haute-Vienne, gave the name of Maurice Boitel to the city hall square. The inauguration occurred on August 11, 2017. The town council ordered the reproduction on canvas of ten pictures of the painter, for decorating the town buildings. They are exhibited in the townhall from August 1 to October 15, 2017.

=== Locations of the paintings ===
The "Municipal Fund contemporary art" of the city of Paris hold about 30 pictures of Maurice Boitel.

Art connoisseurs from Great Britain, United States, Germany, Switzerland, Brazil, Iran, Japan, Venezuela, Saudi Arabia, Lebanon, Mexico, etc., acquired many paintings, as well as the French State and the Town of Paris.

Some of his works may be seen in museums of the following towns: Dijon, St-Maur des fossés, Sceaux, Valence, Algiers, Constantine, Béjaïa in particular and also in the town council hall of Paris and in French embassies around the world.

Ceramics and frescoes (1953 and 1955):

- Voltaire school, in Montreuil-sous-Bois (Seine-Saint-Denis county)
- and Jean-Charles Gatinot school, in Montgeron (Essonne county).

Maurice Boitel painted single-handedly all the frescoes on the classroom walls. In order to make the ceramics himself, he had a kiln built in his own studio. These ceramic panels can still be seen in these schools of Paris close suburbs.

== Work ==
The painter's evolution continued during all his life: up to 1946, the year of his marriage, expressive painting; then from 1946 to 1952, a very coloured painting especially in Algeria. From 1952 to 1965, his landscapes were very constructed, the objects defined by black contours with some flat tints in the knife. During this period, he initially painted close to his home in Paris and Saint-Mandé and also the Cap Gris Nez sober and dark paintings of storms, of boats on the beach, ruins of the war. He also painted characters: clowns, poultry stockbreeders, sailors. Then, from 1958 to 1965, he painted in Cadaqués (Spain) every summer. It is always the same style, firmly framed, but where pass the light and the colors sharp of the Mediterranean (landscapes, navy, portraits, crowd on the beach).

From 1965, his work remained structured but contours disappear. He painted many watercolours, in particular in Nice, in Italy and in Sancerrois. Each year, he visited the Cape Gris-Nez, in Audresselles, or in Ambazac, in the Limousin. The Paris area, where he usually resided, also provided him many subjects (Montmartre, the Bois de Vincennes, islands of the Seine river, the Marne, Guermantes and Conches-sur-Gondoire ). During the eighties, he tended to evoke an idealized reality.

== Bibliography ==
- Bénézit "dictionary of artists" in French (ed.1976 and following), in English (ed. April 2006).
- Catalogue Museum of Boulogne-sur-Mer (1976).
- Young Painting (1941–1961) by Guy Vignoht. Collection Ground of the Painters - Presses of Workshop B.P.C. (1985).
- Surroundings of the Marne and their painters, by Michel Riousset. Press Lienhart printing works and Co (1986).
- The School of Paris (1945–1965) by Lydia Harambourg. Dictionary of the painters. Collection Ides and Calendes (1993) Switzerland.
- Art Gallery collection Japanese woman 1997 - printed in Japan
- Promenade autour de l'Art contemporain (walk around contemporary art), by Jean Monneret, 2001, ed. SAI Société des Artistes Indépendants, Grand Palais, Paris.
- "Voyages en Italie, carnet de croquis de Maurice Boitel"

collection terre des peintres - 3 avenue Percier 75008 Paris - ed. Compagnie Internationale de Banque.

== Artprice reference ==
artist details
