= Ambazac =

- Commune
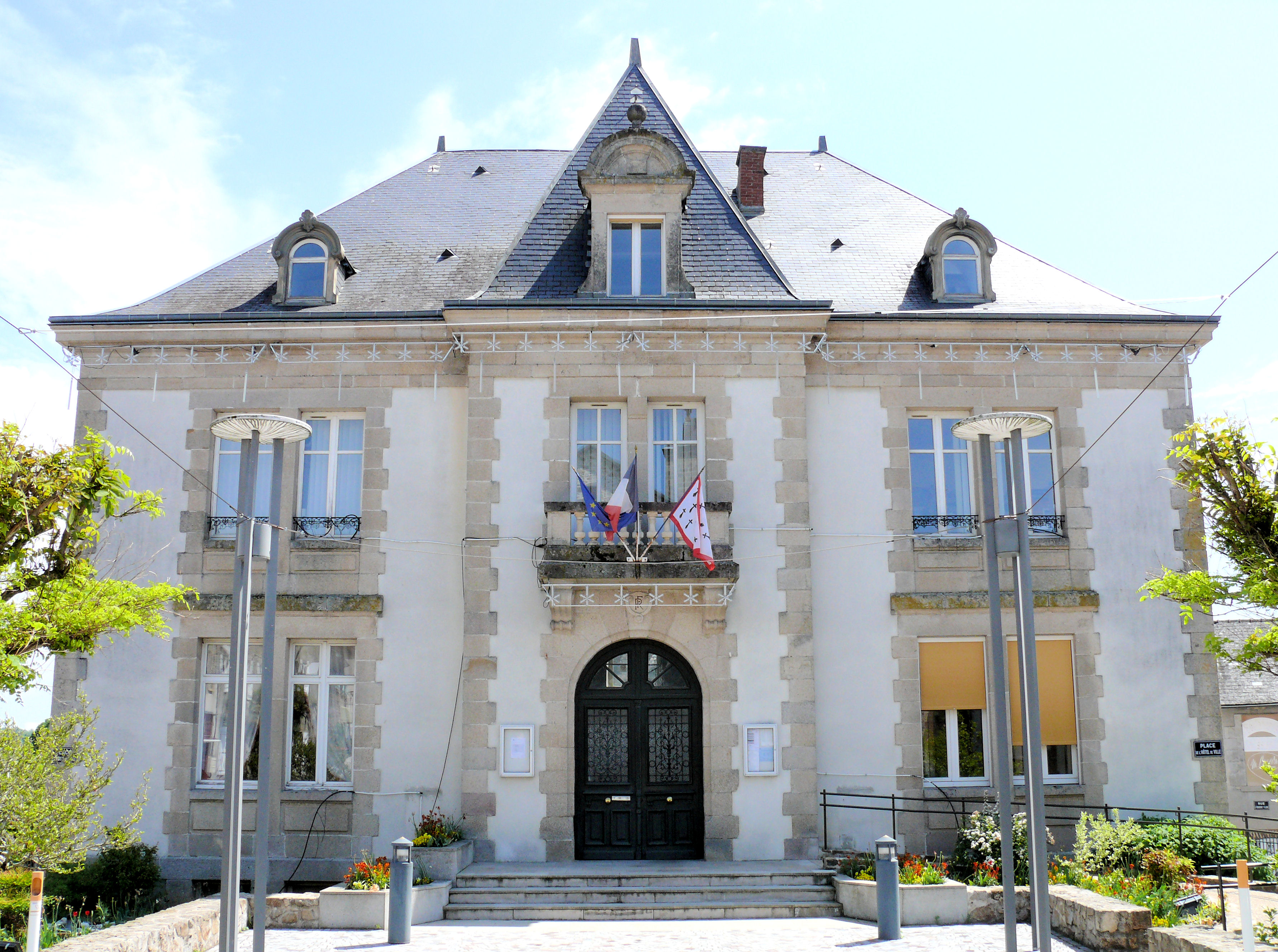
- The town hall in Ambazac

- Coat of arms
- Location of Ambazac
- Location within France Location within Nouvelle-Aquitaine
- Coordinates: 45°57′30″N 1°24′03″E
- Country: France
- Region: Nouvelle-Aquitaine
- Department: Haute-Vienne
- Arrondissement: Limoges
- Canton: Ambazac
- Intercommunality: Élan Limousin Avenir Nature

Government
  - Mayor (2022–2026): Peggy Bariat
- Area^{1}: 57.83 km^{2} (22.33 sq mi)
- Highest elevation: 666 m (2,185 ft)
- Lowest elevation: 243 m (797 ft)
- Population (2023): 5,556
  - Density: 96.07/km^{2} (248.8/sq mi)
- Time zone: UTC+01:00 (CET)
  - Summer (DST): UTC+02:00 (CEST)
- INSEE/Postal code: 87002 /87240
- ^{1} French Land Register data, which excludes lakes, ponds, glaciers > 1 km^{2} (0.386 sq mi or 247 acres) and river estuaries.

Ambazac (French pronunciation: [ɑ̃bazak]; Occitan: Embasac) is a commune in the Haute-Vienne department in the Nouvelle-Aquitaine region in western France.

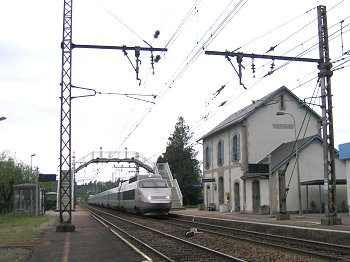
The TGV Brive-la-Gaillarde - Lille-Europe passing at the Ambazac station

== Population ==
Historical population

Year	Pop.	±% p.a.
1968	3,767	—
1975	3,929	+0.60%
1982	4,657	+2.46%
1990	4,889	+0.61%
1999	4,836	−0.12%

Year	Pop.	±% p.a.
2007	5,254	+1.04%
2012	5,604	+1.30%
2017	5,667	+0.22%
2023	5,556	−0.33%

Source: INSEE

== Personalities ==
- Maurice Boitel, painter artist, he painted in Ambazac between 1947 et 1996
- Raymond Desèze, barrister and member of the Académie française
- Canon Landon, épigraphist and Latinist, priest of Ambazac
- Catherine Cesarsky, astrophysicist
- Albert Besson, bacteriologist

== Partner Communities ==
- Eckental (Germany), since 1987
- (France) Soufflenheim (Alsace)

== See also ==
- Communes of the Haute-Vienne department
