= Françoise Ardré =

French phycologist (1931–2010)

- Born: 17 February 1931; Paris, France
- Died: 9 February 2010 (aged 79); Saint-Rémy-lès-Chevreuse, France
- Scientific career
- Fields: Phycology; Marine Science

Françoise Ardré (1931–2010) was a French phycologist and marine scientist, honoured as the namesake of the red alga known as Pterosiphonia ardreana.

After gaining a Doctorate in Sciences, Ardré was in charge of the phycology department of the Muséum national d'Histoire naturelle in Paris. She also conducted research programs in Portugal, in Spain (Cadaqués) and in France (Ile d'Yeu), among other locations. Skilled at holding her breath and diving without a wetsuit in the cold water of the ocean, she personally collected the specimens she was studying.

Her most well known published literary work is Contribution à l'étude des Algues Marines du Portugal I: La Flore (English: Contribution to the Study of the Marine Algas of Portugal I: Flora).

== Bibliography ==
Some of her works:

- Contribution à l'étude des Algues Marines du Portugal (publisher Cino del Duca), Biarritz).
- Observations sur quelques espèces du genre Centroceras (Ceramiaceae, Rhodophyta) 1987.
- Observations nouvelles sur la morphologie et la repartition géographique de trois ceramiales: Ceramium cinnabarinum, Mesothamnion caribaeum et Ctenosiphonia hypneoides. In collaboration with Ir. Hardy-Halos and L. Saldanha, 1982.

== Other ==
Portraits of Françoise Ardré were painted, inspiring painters such as Maurice Boitel and Pierre Béchon.
