= Audresselles =

Audresselles Ouderzelle
- Commune
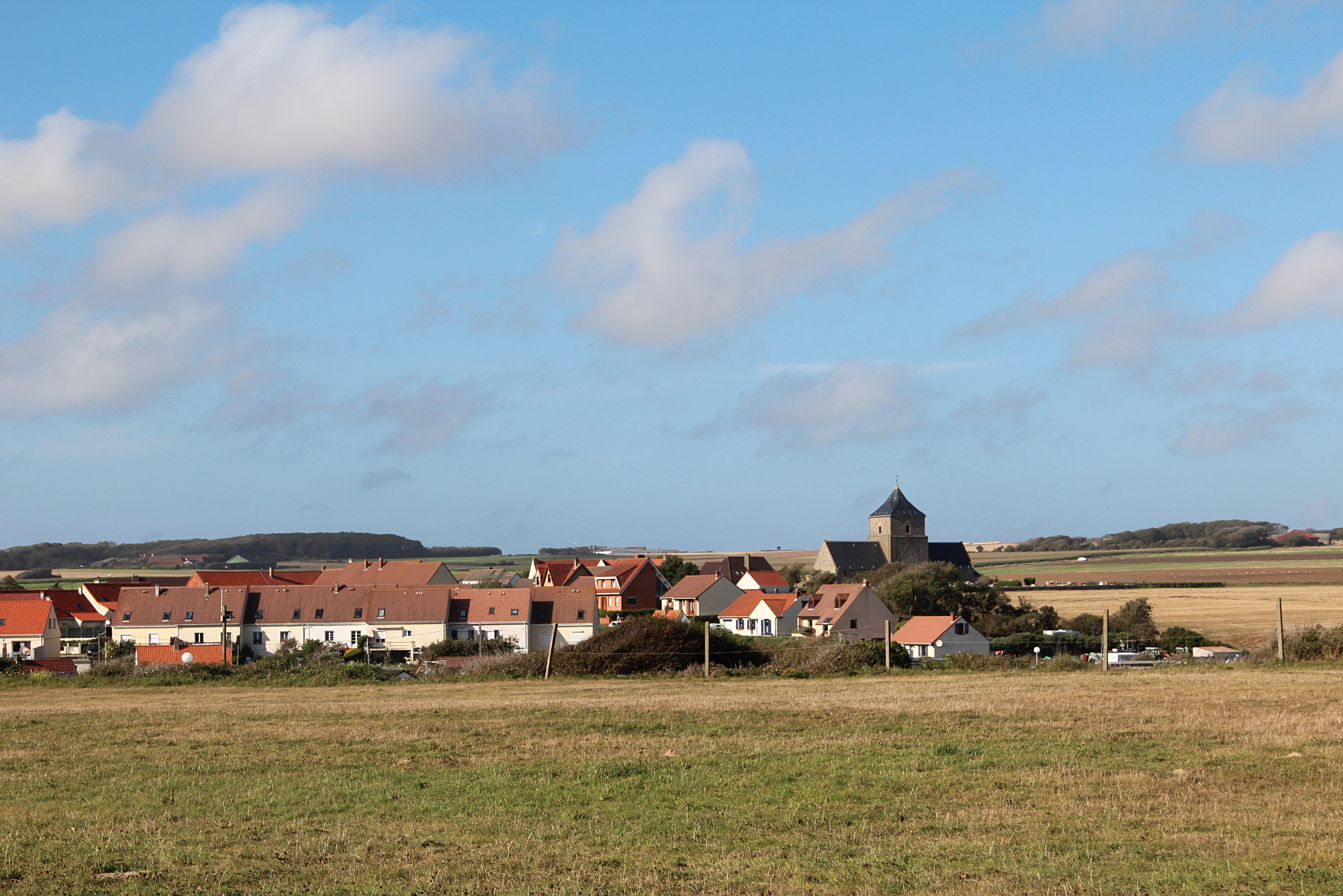
- The village

- Coat of arms
- Location of Audresselles
- Location within France Location within Hauts-de-France
- Coordinates: 50°49′28″N 1°35′41″E
- Country: France
- Region: Hauts-de-France
- Department: Pas-de-Calais
- Arrondissement: Boulogne-sur-Mer
- Canton: Desvres
- Intercommunality: CC Terre des Deux Caps

Government
  - Mayor (2026–32): Antoine Benoit
- Area^{1}: 5.72 km^{2} (2.21 sq mi)
- Elevation: 30 m (98 ft)
- Highest elevation: 114 m (374 ft)
- Lowest elevation: 0 m (0 ft)
- Population (2023): 608
  - Density: 106/km^{2} (275/sq mi)
- Demonym: Audressellois
- Time zone: UTC+01:00 (CET)
  - Summer (DST): UTC+02:00 (CEST)
- INSEE/Postal code: 62056 /62164
- ^{1} French Land Register data, which excludes lakes, ponds, glaciers > 1 km^{2} (0.386 sq mi or 247 acres) and river estuaries.

Audresselles (French pronunciation: [odʁəsɛl]; Dutch: Oderzele; Picard: Auderselle) is a commune south of Cape Gris Nez in the Pas-de-Calais department in northern France.

The commune covers about 2,000 acres (810 ha) of cultivated lands, two beaches, and seashore cliffs. In the 12th century it was known as Oderzelle.

== History ==
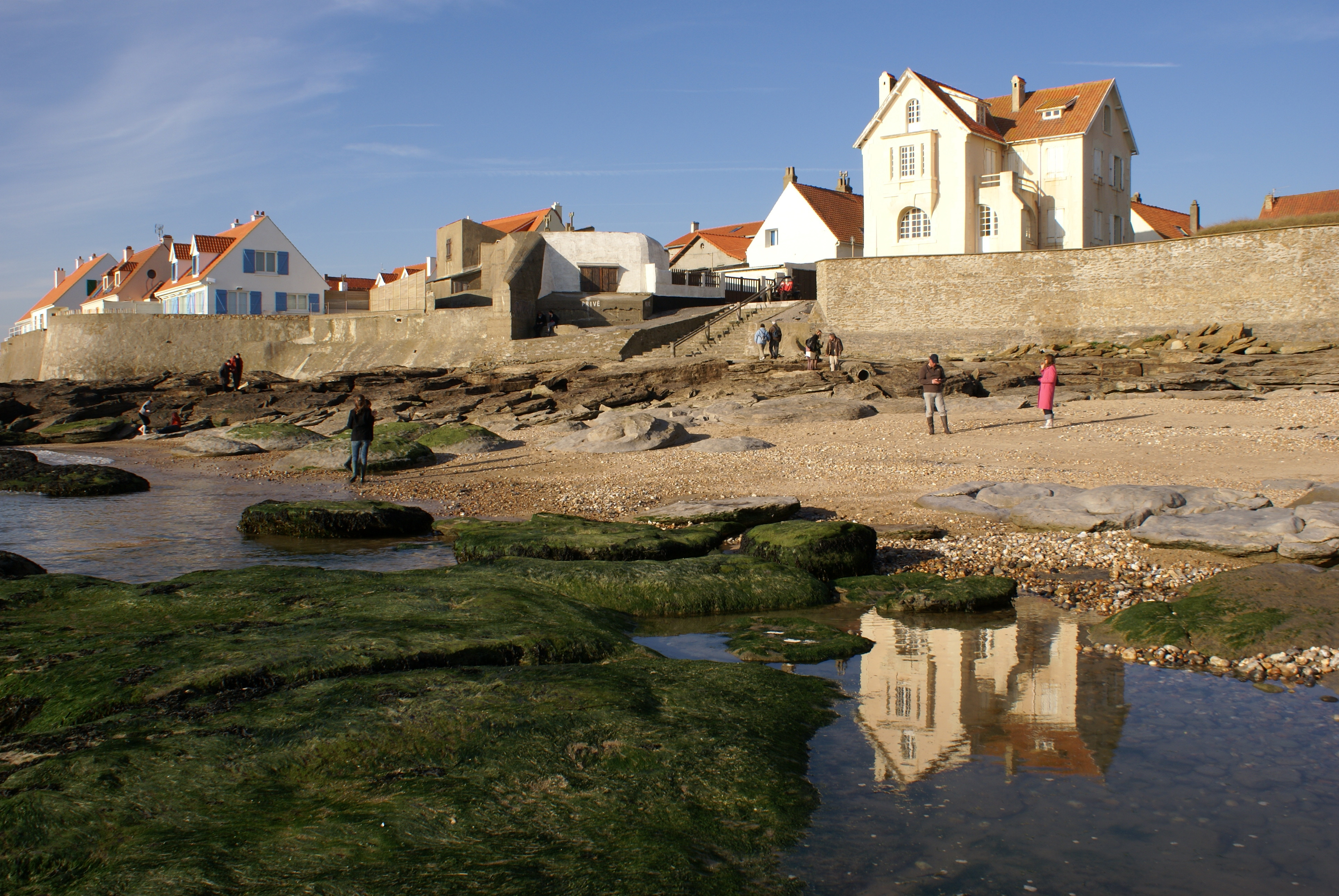
Seafront

Between the end of English occupation in 1558 and the middle of the 17th century, Audresselles seigneury included Haringzelle hamlet; today, this is now a forest hiding the former German artillery batteries of Audinghen. This seigneury was owned by the Acary family, which gave some admirals to the French fleet and from whom most of the borough fishermen are descended.

An old fishers' village, Audresselles has kept its characteristic features: its long houses with a colored strip along the lower part of the walls, in the village center, and some villas of the "Belle Époque" in front of the English Channel. Professional fishing families still live in Audresselles, and one of them uses the village sand beach to land its ship. The traditional flobarts (little truncated longships) are still used by the holiday yachtsmen.

== Population ==
Historical population
Year	Pop.	±% p.a.
1968	447	—
1975	489	+1.29%
1982	538	+1.37%
1990	587	+1.10%
1999	681	+1.66%
2007	709	+0.50%
2012	692	−0.48%
2017	649	−1.27%
2023	608	−1.08%
Source: INSEE

== Sights ==
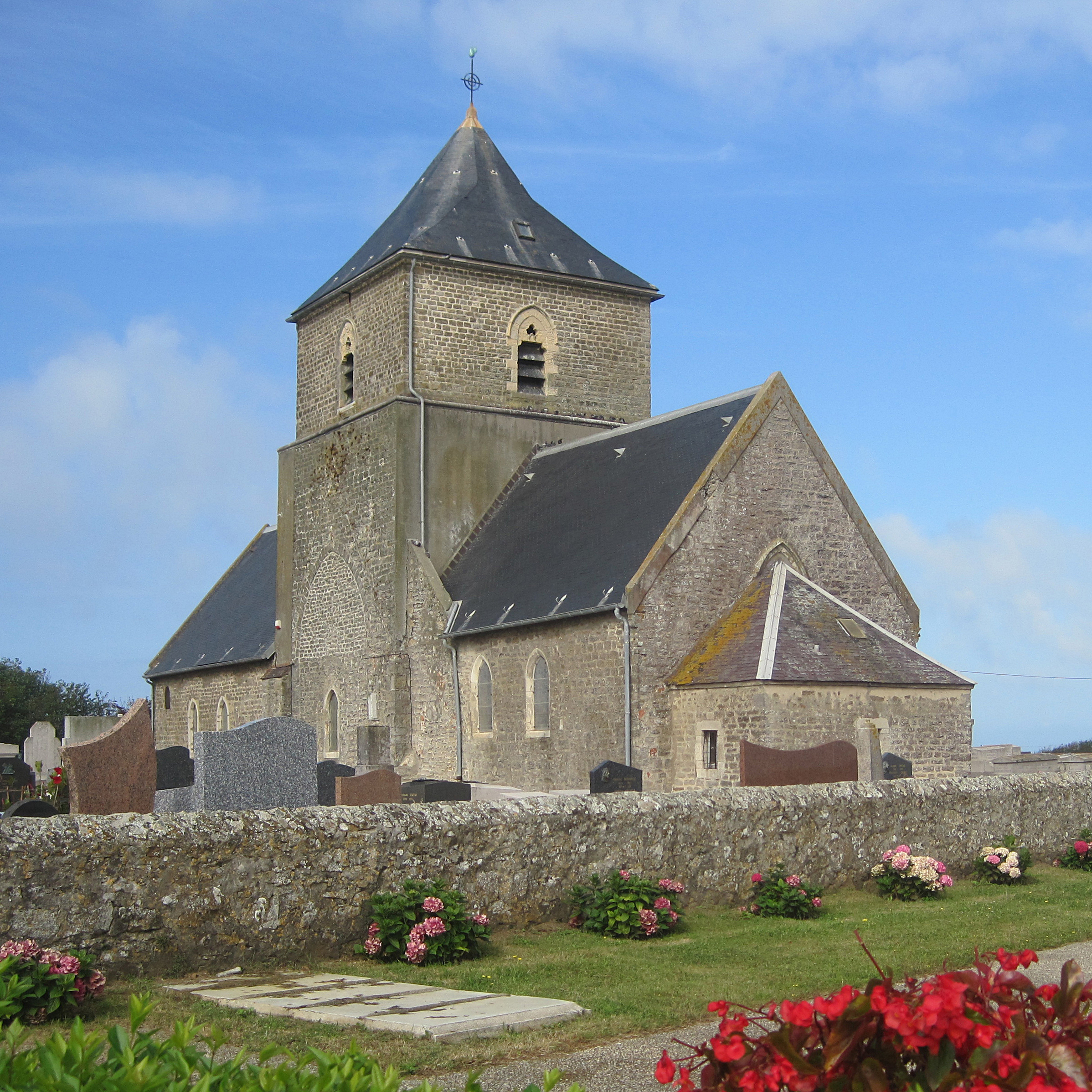
The church of Saint-Jean-Baptiste (12th century)

- The Church of Saint John the Baptist, fortified, 12th century, with large canvas of the Second Empire painted in the Catholic workhalls of Father Jacques Paul Migne by Arthur Gilbert and a little 18th century reredos
- Saint-John farm (11th century) with the stone-cross of the crusader in the front wall
- The coaching inn, rue Édouard Quénu (18th century)
- The panoramic allée Maurice Boitel

== Beach and dune fauna ==
=== Birds ===
Birds found here include gulls, cormorants, jackdaws, loons, mallards, bitterns, sandpipers, snipes, oystercatchers, herons, curlews, egrets, guillemots, peregrine falcons, swans, and geese.

=== Marine mammals ===
Some black-headed seals have settled down in the creeks behind the village since July 2006 and dislike to be disturbed, following the swimmers to the beach. Also present are orcas (killer whales), pilot whales, dolphins and porpoises.

== Flora ==
Plants of this region are those that can resist the salt-laden southwesterly wind. Species include lyciet, privet, spindle-tree, eleagnus, speedwell, marram grass and Armeria maritima.

== Personalities ==
- Robert Beauvais, writer and journalist
- Albert Besson, bacteriologist
- Maurice Boitel, painter
- Carolus-Duran, painter
- Albert-Ernest Carrier-Belleuse, painter
- Catherine Destivelle, alpinist
- Henri Dutilleux, composer
- Arthur Gilbert, English painter whose paintings can be seen in the choir of the church
- Philippe de Hauteclocque said Leclerc, marshal of France
- Edmond Marin la Meslée, aviator

== See also ==
- Communes of the Pas-de-Calais department

== Bibliography ==
- "Audresselles, éléments d'une histoire", éd. Association Mémoire d'Audresselles, by Daniel Leunens.
- "Rivages boulonnais", éd. Association Mémoire d'Audresselles, by Olivier Lazzarotti (December 2006).
- "Nobiliaire de Picardie", page 1, written in 1698 by Jérôme Bignon.
