= Société Nationale des Beaux-Arts =

Professional organization in France

Société Nationale des Beaux-Arts | Salon du Champ-de-Mars
- 1890 Headquarters
- Years active: Established in 1862. Annual exhibitions began in 1890.
- Location: France
- Major figures: Eugène Delacroix, Carrier-Belleuse, Puvis de Chavannes, Léon Bonnat, Jean-Baptiste Carpeaux, Charles-François Daubigny, Gustave Doré, and Édouard Manet, Ernest Meissonier, Carolus-Duran, Bracquemond, Carrier-Belleuse,
- Influences: Likely inspired by the 1791 Champ de Mars Massacre, which killed 50 civilians in a clash with the military, and radicalized Paris as a result
- Influenced: Multiple (art) Secessions in Munich (1892), Vienna (1897), and Berlin (1898)

Société Nationale des Beaux-Arts (SNBA; French: [sɔsjete nɑsjɔnal dɛ boz‿aʁ]; English: National Society of Fine Arts) was the term under which two groups of French artists united, the first for some exhibitions in the early 1860s, the second since 1890 for annual exhibitions.

== 1862 ==
Established in 1862 by the painter and gallery owner Louis Martinet and the writer Théophile Gautier, the Société Nationale des Beaux-Arts was first chaired by Gautier, with the painter Aimé Millet as deputy chairman. The committee was composed of the painters Eugène Delacroix, Carrier-Belleuse, and Puvis de Chavannes, and among the exhibitors were Léon Bonnat, Jean-Baptiste Carpeaux, Charles-François Daubigny, Gustave Doré, and Édouard Manet. In 1864, just after the death of Delacroix, the society organized a retrospective exhibition of 248 paintings and lithographs of this famous painter and step-uncle of the emperor – and ceased to mount further exhibitions.

The 19th century in French art is characterised by a continuous struggle between traditionally educated artists supported by official politics, and a growing rate of artists who preferred to work individually and at their own risks. Reviewing the historical situation is difficult, even a century later. But evidently opponents to the official politics gained ground after the fall of the 2nd Empire, and were instrumental to redirect French cultural politics to liberal positions. Thus, the splitting-off of the Société Nationale des Beaux-Arts in 1890 can be considered as the first Secessionist manifestation.

== 1890 ==
In 1890, the Société Nationale des Beaux-Arts was re-vitalised under the rule of Puvis de Chavannes, Ernest Meissonier, Carolus-Duran, Bracquemond and Carrier-Belleuse, and since then its annual exhibition was reviewed as the Salon du Champ-de-Mars, traditionally opening a fortnight later than the official Salon des Champs-Élysées, organised by the Société des artistes français.

Suzanne Valadon became the first female painter to be admitted to the Société in 1894.

=== A new way ===
After World War I, in 1926, the "Puvis de Chavannes" prize was created consisting in a retrospective exhibition of the main works of the prizewinning artists, in Paris. During the twentieth century, this exhibition was located at the Grand Palais or the Musée d'Art Moderne.

Most famous awarded painters:

- 1941: Wilhem Van Hasselt,
- 1944: Jean Gabriel Domergue,
- 1952: Tristan Klingsor,
- 1955: Georges Delplanque,
- 1957: Albert Decaris,
- 1958: Jean Picard Le Doux,
- 1963: Maurice Boitel,
- 1966: Pierre Gaillardot,
- 1968: Pierre-Henry,
- 1969: Louis Vuillermoz,
- 1970: Daniel du Janerand,
- 1971: Jean-Pierre Alaux;
- 1975: Jean Monneret,
- 1987: André Hambourg.

During the last decades of the 20th century, after "living treasure" Takanori Oguiss, and during the rule of chairman François Baboulet, several Japanese artists exhibited their paintings as guests of the SNBA: Takaaki Matsuda, Katsufumi Toyota, Kazuko Kobayashi, Hideo Hando, Yoko Tsuishi and Noboru Sotoyama.

== Gallery ==
1891 Catalogue Cover

1892 Catalogue Cover

1893 Catalogue Cover

1904 Catalogue Cover
