= Longboat (disambiguation) =

A longboat is a type of ship's boat.

Longboat or long boat or variant, may also refer to:

== Places ==
- Longboat Key, Florida, an American town
- Longboat Corners, Ontario, in Canada

== People ==
- Tom Longboat (1887–1949), Canadian Onondaga athlete

== Nautical ==
- Long boat rescue, rescue boats formed by long boats
- MV Longboat, a World War II Empire Ship
- Long-tail boat, Southeast Asian boat
- Celtic longboat, racing rowing boat

== Other uses ==
- Longboat (horse) (1981–1997), UK thoroughbred racehorse
- Longboat Observer, American newspaper based in Longboat Key, Florida
- Tom Longboat Awards, awards established in 1951 to recognize aboriginal athletes of Canada

== See also ==
- List of longest ships
- Longship (disambiguation)
