= Trophy, Hypertrophied =

Drawing by Max Ernst

Trophy Hypertrophied
- Artist: Max Ernst
- Year: 1919
- Type: Line-block with Pen and ink on paper
- Dimensions: 41.9 cm × 28 cm (16 1/2 in × 11 in)
- Location: Museum of Modern Art; New York City

Trophy, Hypertrophied (1919) is a work of art by the German artist Max Ernst who was a pioneer of the Dada movement and Surrealism in Europe. This work is believed to be one of Ernst's earliest known pieces. The work was produced using a technique called line-block printing – a type of relief printing – to which Ernst later added further detail by drawing over the design with pen and ink. It depicts a complex mechanical instrument featuring a series of pulleys, gears and planetary symbols. The style of the work resembles a schematic drawing or architectural plan. Ernst created a similar piece the same year titled Farewell My Beautiful Land of Mary Laurencen. Help! Help! Trophy, Hypertrophied is a part of the collection of the Museum of Modern Art in New York City, USA.
