= Nat Mayer Shapiro =

American painter

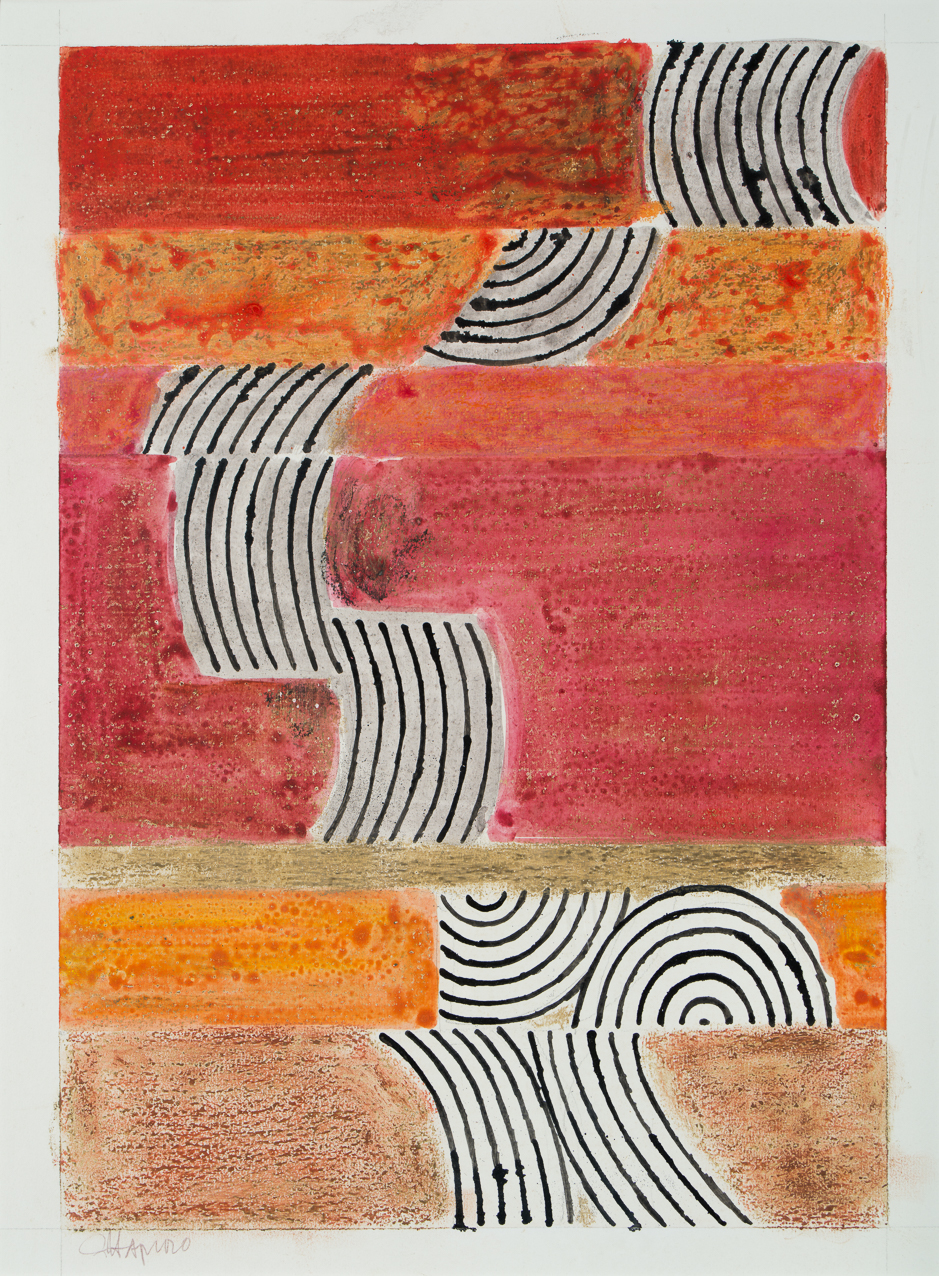
- Frieze, Nat Mayer Shapiro (India ink, oil stick and gouache on paper), 2001
- Born: June 2, 1919; New York, NY, USA
- Died: December 2, 2005 (aged 86); New York, NY, USA
- Resting place: Montefiore Cemetery, Wyandanch, NY, USA
- Website: https://nat.shapiro.fr/

Nathan Mayer Shapiro (1919 – 2005) was an American visual artist. He is known for his paintings on canvas and paper, as well as monumental sculptures. He was active in Chicago (USA), Paris (France) and the New York area (USA). Nat Mayer Shapiro's work and life are the subject of the book Nat Mayer Shapiro, Rigor and Joy.

== Artwork ==
Nat Mayer Shapiro is best known for his complex paintings on paper and canvas that may incorporate structural and whimsical imagery among areas of pure or constructed abstraction. He did not adhere to any particular school or art movement, remaining an individualist throughout his life. He was much inspired by his travels, particularly Greek and Byzantine churches, the mosaics of Ravenna, and the landscapes of Morocco, and by his Jewish culture.

His work is abundant (over 900 paintings, drawings, assemblages and sculptures) and highly diverse, ranging from the figurative to pure abstraction and Op art. With its dynamic mix of humorous vignettes, biblical scenes, rigorous geometric compositions, whimsical anthropomorphic sculptures, dancing kites, and visions of an unfathomable cosmos, his oeuvre is in turn serious, mischievous and ethereal. Shapiro asserts his style and personality by combining dynamics and clarity of composition, line and depth, and a subtle modulation of the chromatic scale. His work expresses an independent spirit, infinite curiosity and an abiding interest in humanity. There is a constant search for line, color, depth and movement, between lightness and rigor, with a poetic and mocking sense of deadpan humor.

=== The Bible: An Atheist’s Perspective ===
The Exodus series comprises seven acrylic paintings on canvas executed in Paris in 1966–1967, depicting scenes from the Bible of the Israelites’ exodus from Egypt. A monochrome palette eliminates color and depth, focusing attention on line and form. Subtle references to Kabbalistic texts testify to Shapiro's knowledge of the religious legacy, despite his avowed atheism. (See Worshipping False Gods, opposite.)

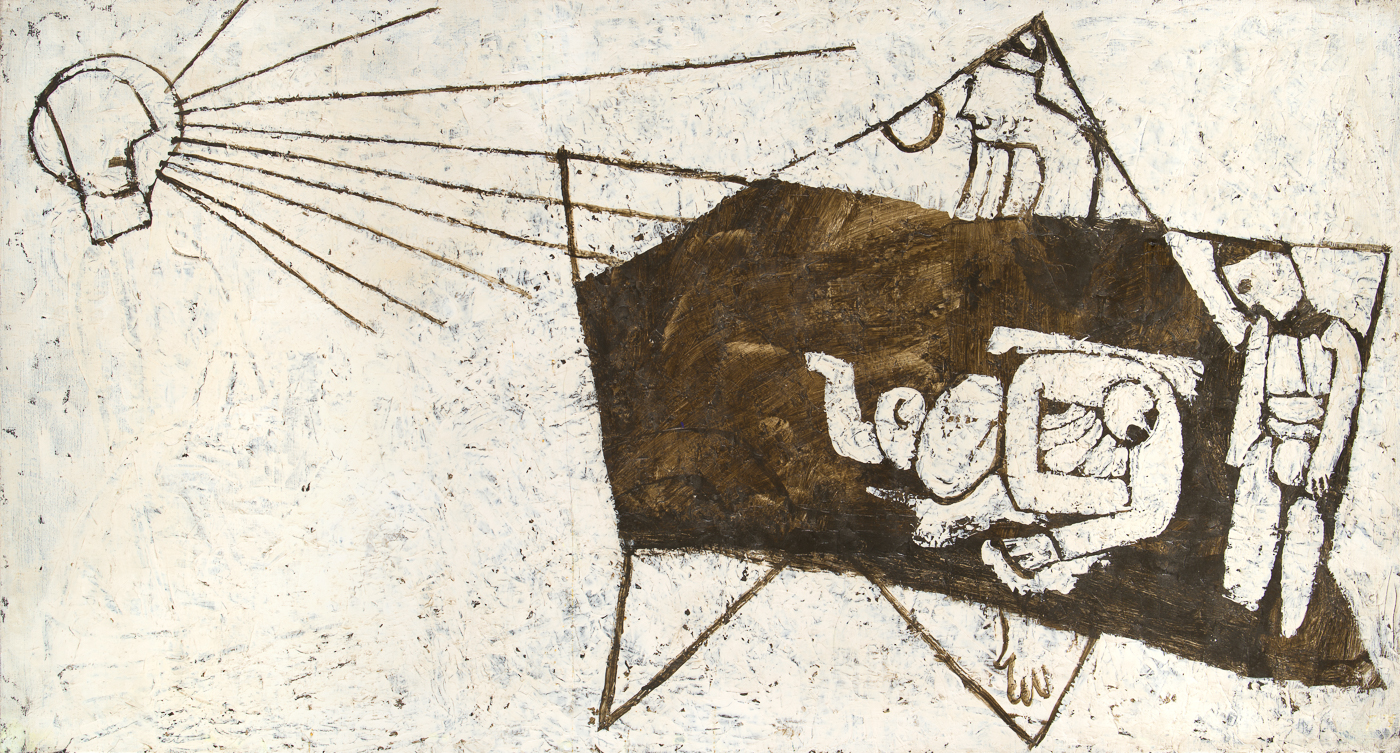
(Exodus) Worshipping False Gods. Acrylic on canvas, 1966–1967.

In 1998, in New York, Shapiro crafted a second biblical series of 32 acrylic paintings on canvas: Genesis, a playful rendering of the beginnings of humanity and of the Jewish people. In the same vein, the painting The Dictation – Moses on Mount Sinai – Les fesses de Dieu (opposite), presents Moses receiving the Tables of the Law. Echoing the Bible's edict that Moses not see the face of God, Shapiro paints God from the back, playfully accentuating his bare behind.

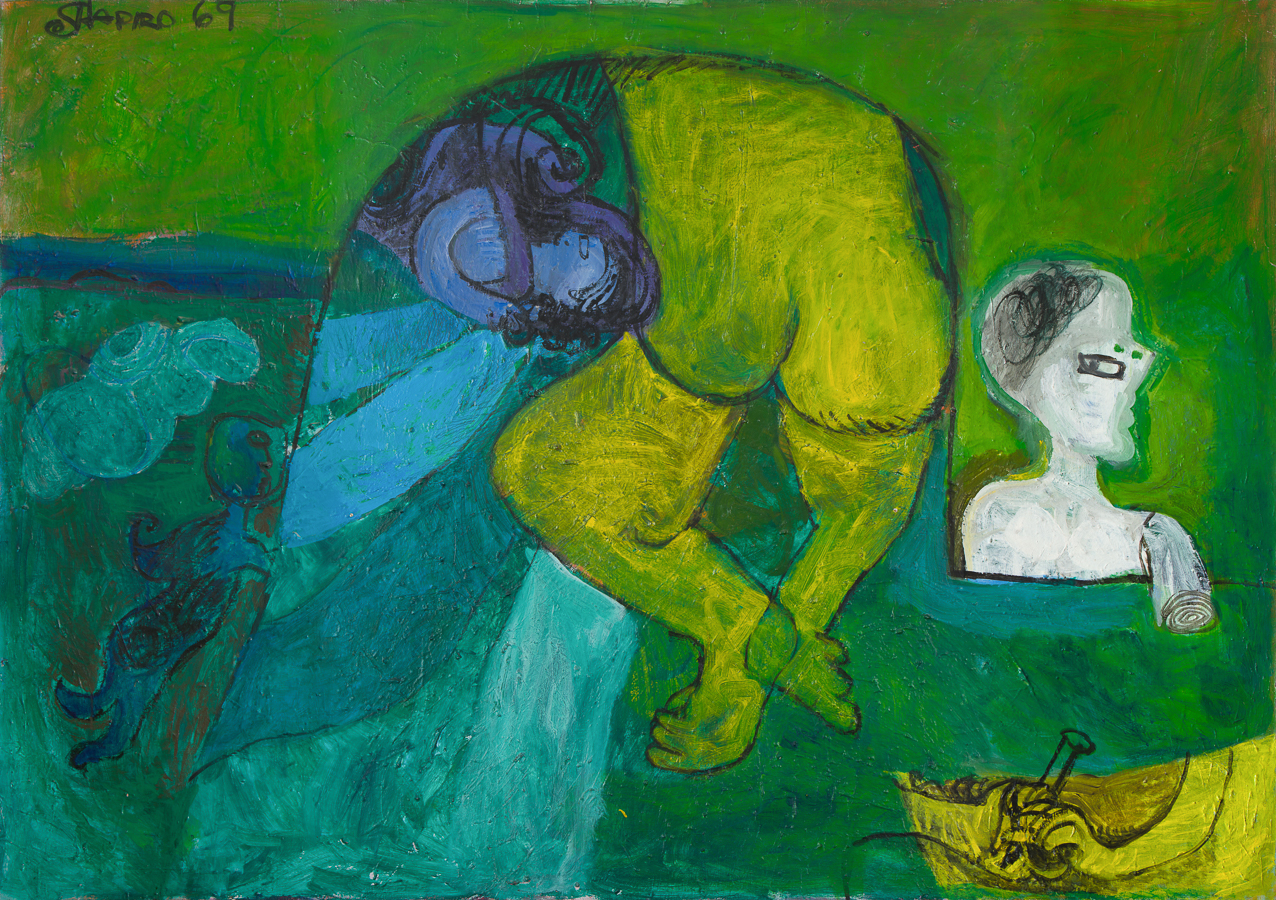
The Dictation – Moses on Mount Sinai – Les fesses de Dieu. Oil on canvas, 1969.

If Shapiro could poke fun at the Hebrew Bible, he could also express the darkness of the Jewish experience. He was deeply affected by the Old Jewish Cemetery in Prague, an area of less than two hectares in which 12,000 gravestones rest on more than 100,000 bodies, buried in layers. Shapiro produced seven paintings and works on paper inspired by this 15th century site.

=== Kites ===
Begun in 1979, the Kites series comprises 39 works, both paintings and assemblages.

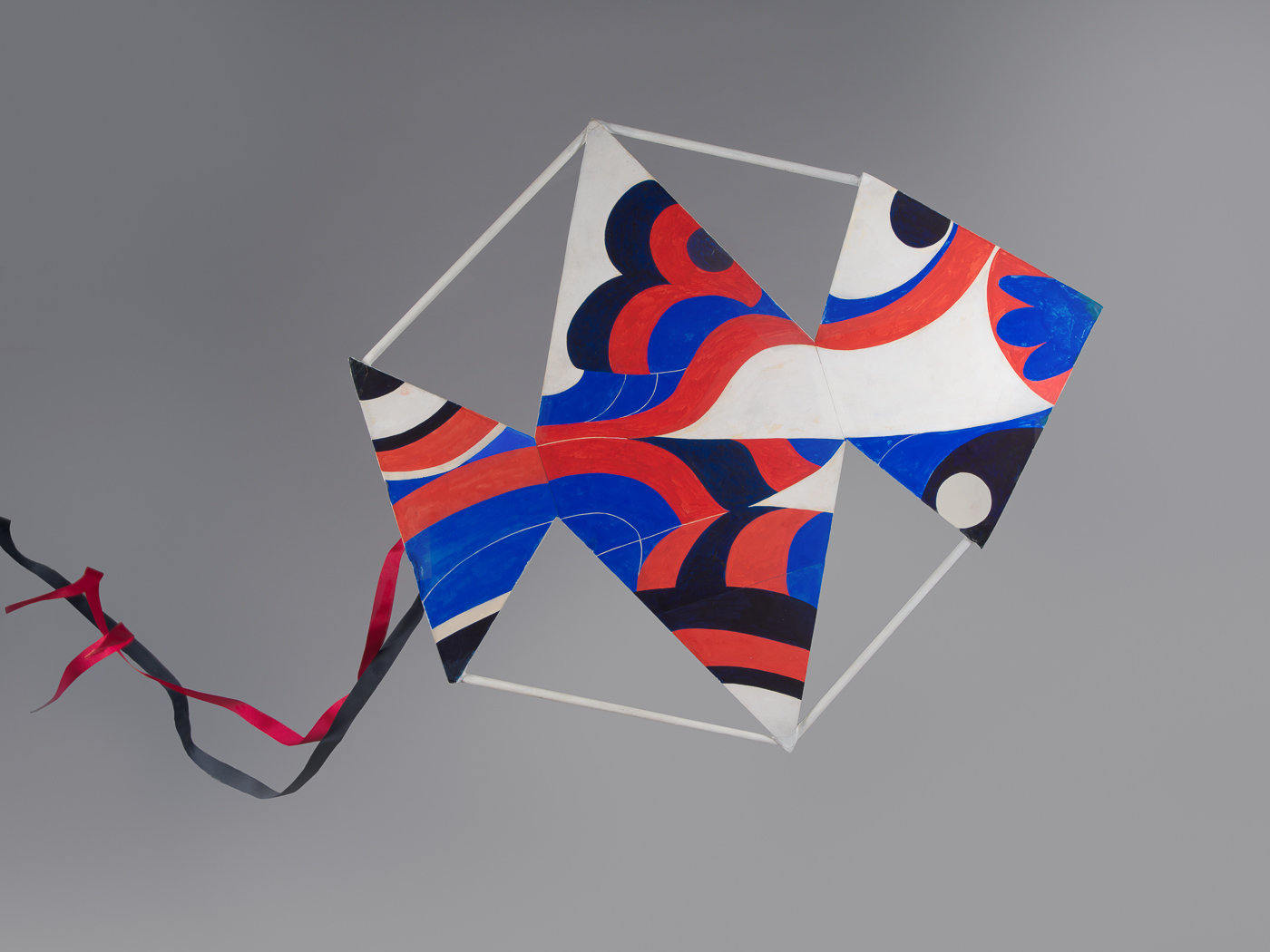
(Kites) Red, White and Blue Kite. NMS-0187 Acrylic on styrofoam and wood; undated.

Night Kites (opposite) depicts several kites against the background of a night-blue sky. Slight variations create the illusion of moving triangles, reminiscent of Kandinsky’s use of angular lines, basic geometric shapes and bold, contrasting colors. True to form, Shapiro references the Russian artist's existentialism through an object of whimsy.

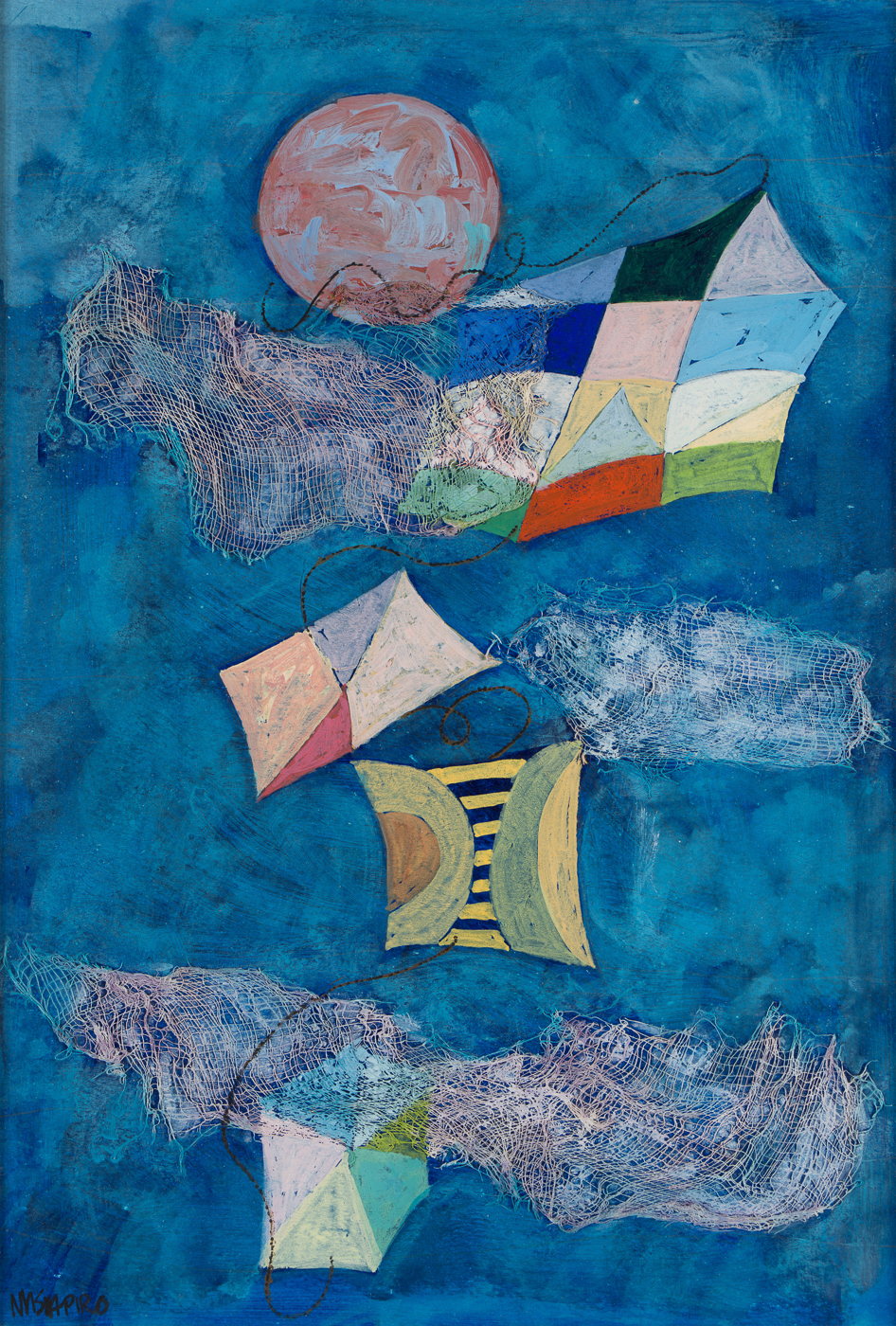
(Kites) Night Kites. Acrylic, gouache and gauze collage on paper, 1998.

=== Monumental sculptures ===
In the 1960s–70s, Shapiro produced a series of fanciful, anthropomorphic sculptures in wood or epoxy-lacquered expanded polystyrene. These sculptures blur the boundary between abstraction and figuration, incorporating shoes, legs and heads into bulbous organic forms.

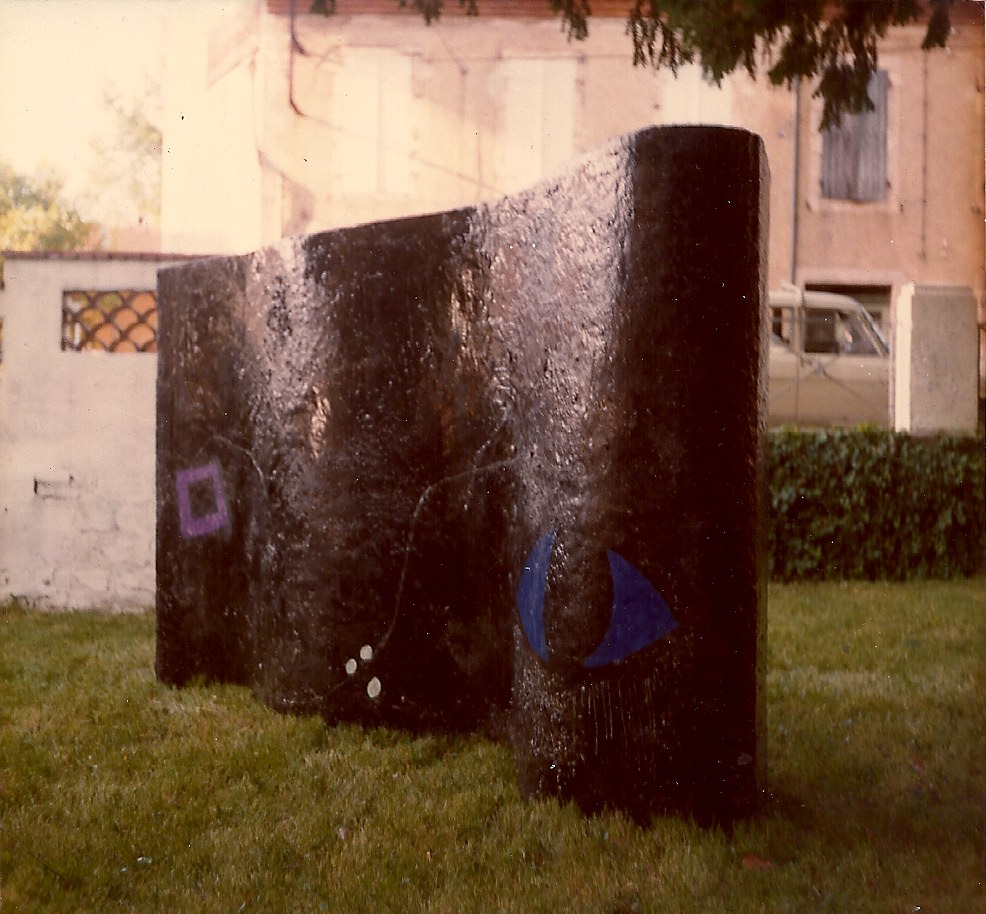
Evolution / The Wall. styrofoam; base: polyester resin with fibre glass, gravel, colored paper and acrylic paint, 1974.

The imposing sculpture Evolution/The Wall, 1974, a solitary, undulating wall section, appears as an abstract black void, decorated with organic white lines and colored shapes ranging from rudimentary squares to recognizable human eyes. In the artist's own words: “By the design and undulation on this sculpture, I have tried to show man in constant movement through the centuries, tying with a white line his most primitive expression (the square) to that of his intelligence, his intellectualism (the eye), by means of a white line, the whole calculated to vaguely resemble a face.”

=== The Greek series ===
Between 1965 and 1975, Shapiro made several trips to Greece, notably to testify on behalf of his friend Yannis Leloudas, on trial for his opposition to the Colonels' dictatorship. It was there that he found inspiration for two series of works. The "Byzantine" series comprises 35 works, with clean lines in Indian ink. It features the black robes of popes, and the curves and domes of Greek churches.

The later "Icons" series comprises 18 works, inspired by the icons and ex-votos that abound in Greek Orthodox churches. They are painted in acrylic on styrofoam board covered with papier-mâché. Highly colored and textured, they depict dreamlike scenes of barely sketched human silhouettes, cities and situations. In Meeting (opposite), for example, a royal-blue figure embraces a statue; a purple bubble above their heads resembles a comic-book speech bubble; all are set against a dark background in a temple-like frame.

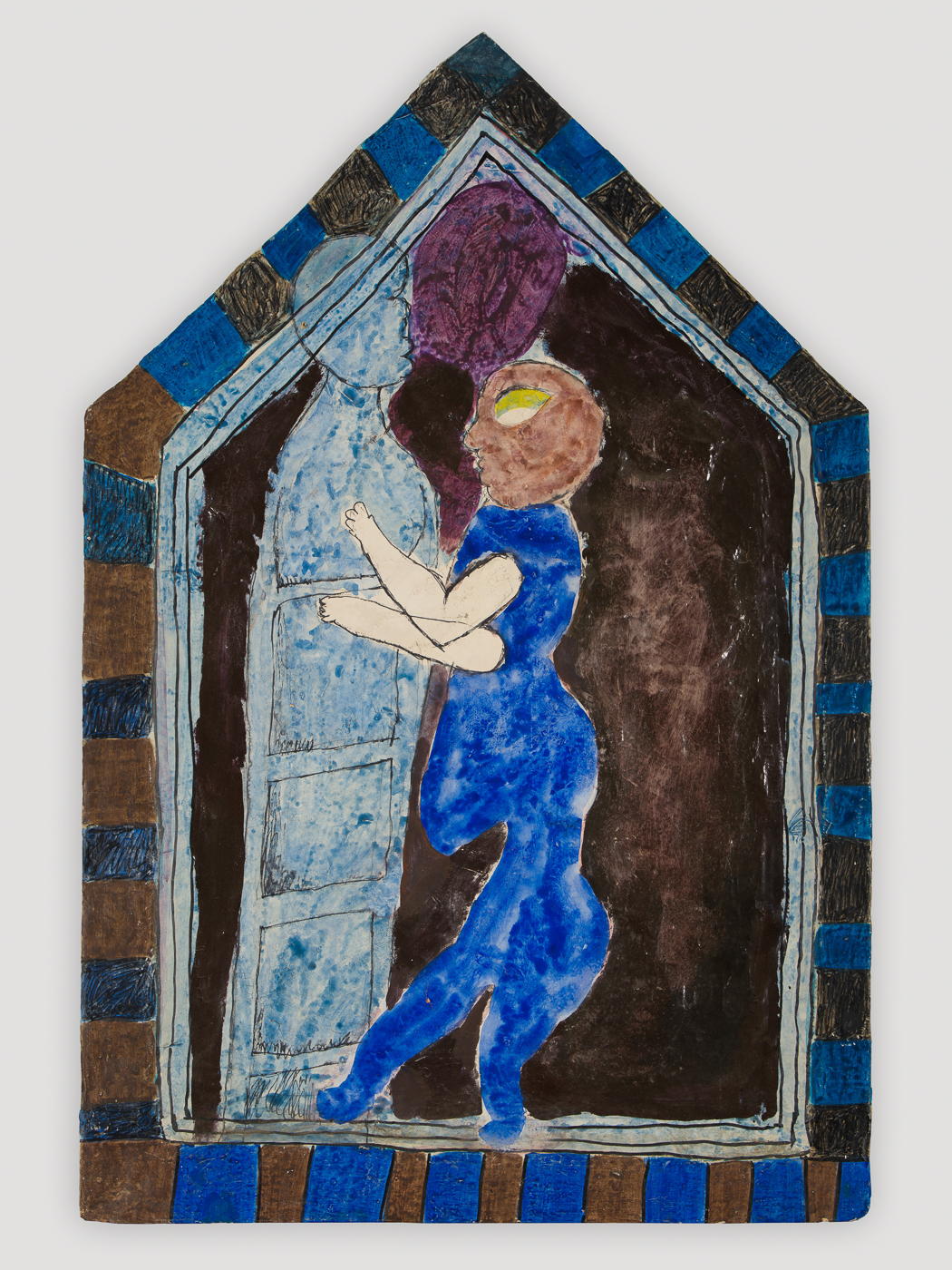
Meeting. Acrylic on styrofoam, 1976.

=== The Galaxy series ===
The theme of the afterlife takes greater importance towards the end of Shapiro's life, culminating in his Galaxy series. He calls the galaxy "mysterious, volatile and sublime". In this series, the paintings Blue Moon and Light Theory II represent a dark, melancholy search, offering an exploration of spirituality further removed from the religion of his childhood, and irony towards the religious. To quote Shapiro: “Art moves in all sorts of unimagined directions, and leads to unsuspected dimensions. My art, which lacks definable perimeters, seems to go outside myself. I am honestly unaware of its playful, positive nature, as I am of its weight. And yet, they are there. In the end, art is as much a mystery to me as it is to others.”

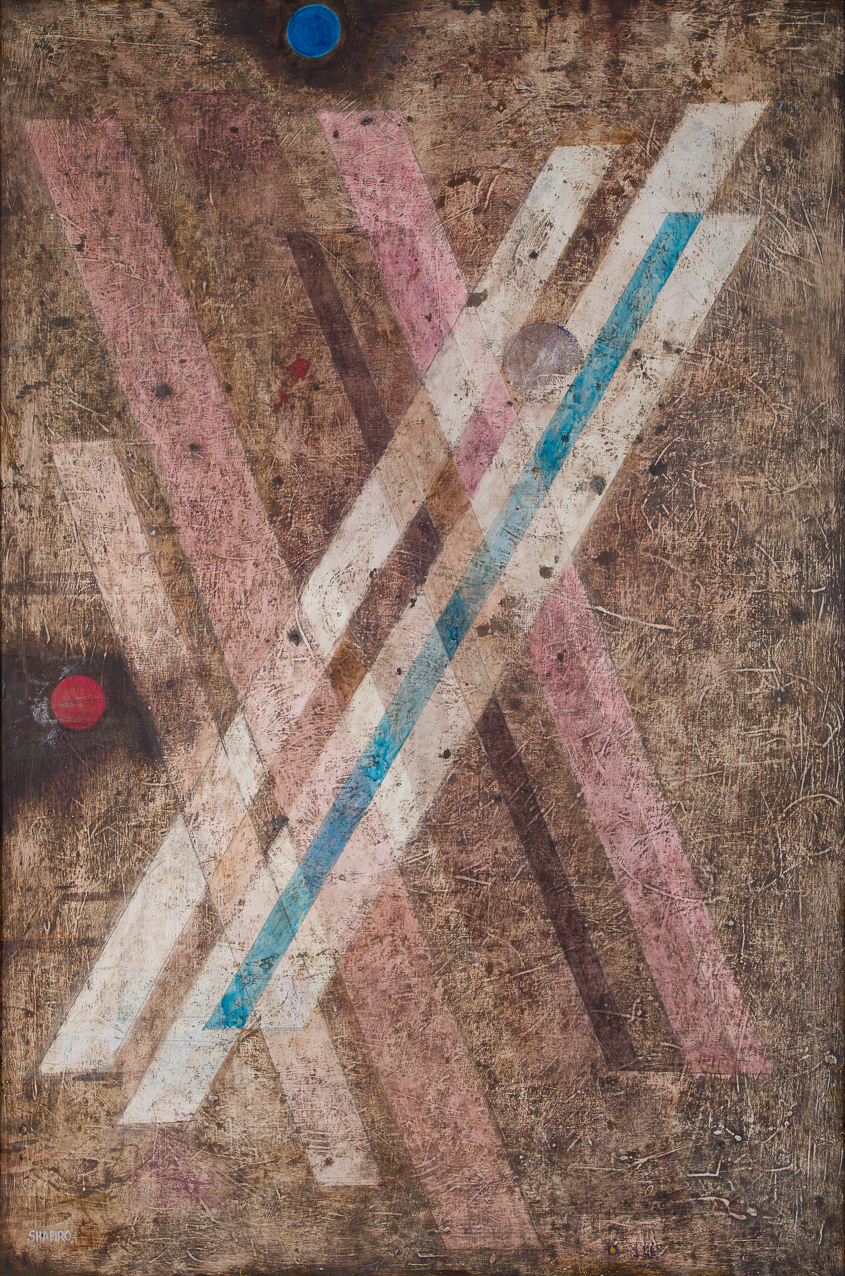
Blue Moon. Acrylic on canvas, NMS-0687, 1985

== Life ==
Nat Shapiro was born in New York City and grew up in Brooklyn. At the age of ten he decided to become an artist. As a teenager, he attended evening classes at the Pratt Institute.

In 1941, Shapiro joined the U.S. Army, and was assigned to the Medical Corps in Australia and New Guinea for four and a half years. Back in the United States, he spent eight months in the Rest & Rehabilitation Center in Lake Placid, New York, where he worked as an artist, painting theater sets, portraits and landscapes. In 1945, the War Department acquired some of his works for the planned War Museum.

Back to civilian life, he worked as an illustrator under the signature "Mayer" and attended the Art Students League of New York. In 1951, married with two children, he moved with his family to Chicago, where he established himself as an artist. Adventurous and curious, he traveled to Italy and France in 1960. He finally settled with his family in France in 1961, first in the South, near Grasse, then in Paris. In Paris, he studied at the Académie de la Grande Chaumière and experimented with various media and styles. His artistic personality developed, while he pursued a parallel career as an illustrator. He traveled extensively in Europe, finding inspiration in Greek churches, the mosaics of Ravenna, the landscapes of Morocco and the Jewish cemetery in Prague.

Jewish culture and history played an important role. His parents were religious and maintained Jewish traditions. Although he rejected religion as an adult, Shapiro nevertheless became interested in the Hebrew Bible, the Kabbalah and the writings of Roman historian Flavius Josephus.

In 1985, Shapiro returned to New York and settled in the YoHo artists' building in Westchester County. He was instrumental in locating, setting up and launching Westchester's oldest fine arts cooperative gallery in Dobbs Ferry, the Upstream Gallery of which he was president from 1995 to 2002. He died in New York City.

== Collections ==
Nat Mayer Shapiro's works of art can be found in numerous private art collections throughout the world, and are included in the permanent art collections of the Ministry of Culture (Fonds National d'Art Contemporain—FNAC), Paris, France, The Art Gallery of the Queensborough Community College, Queens, NY and Pfizer Inc. New York City. He is represented by Galerie Saphir in Paris and Dinard, France.

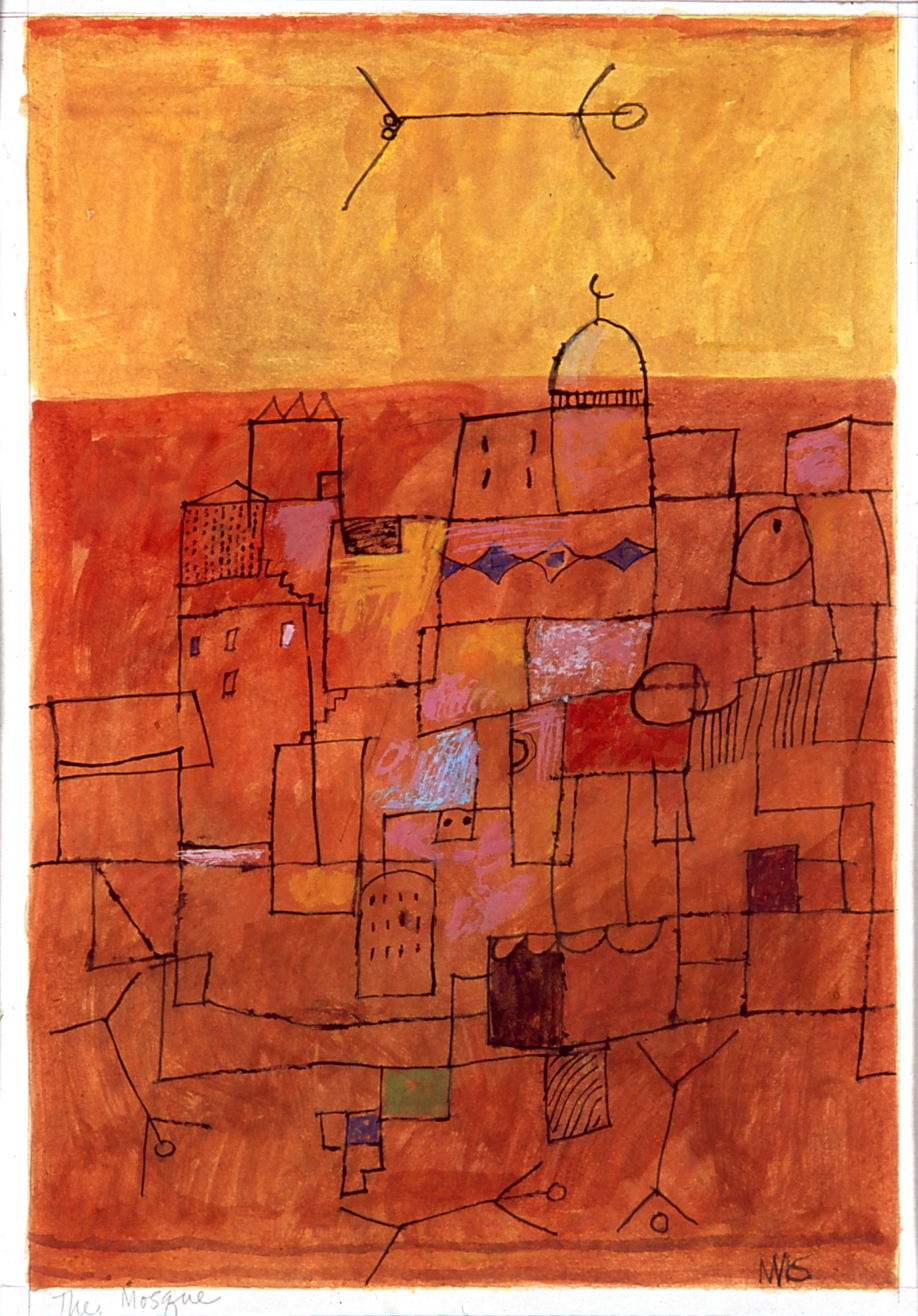
Moroccan Village —The Mosque. Gouache and India ink on paper, undated.

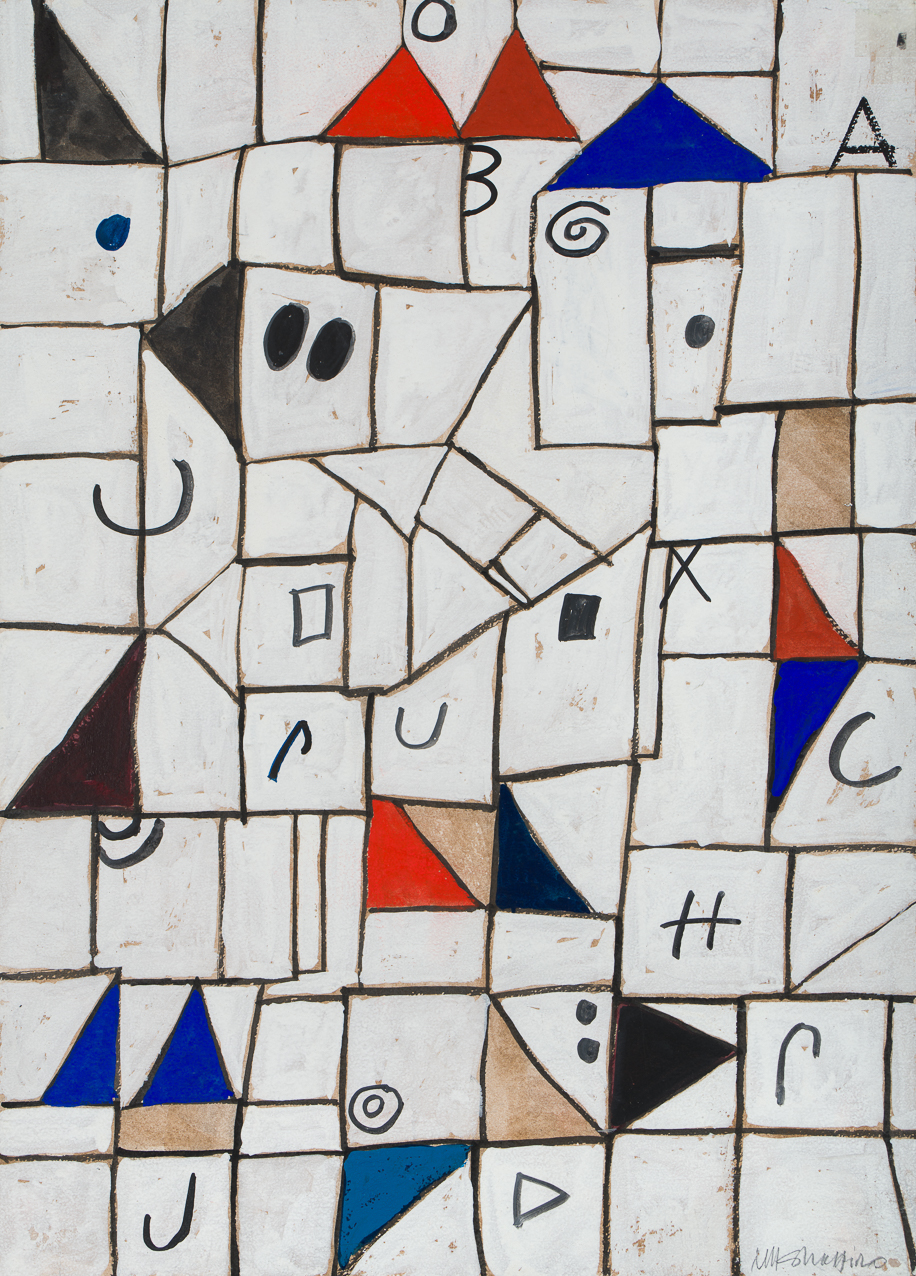
A, B, C. Acrylic on cardboard, 1993.

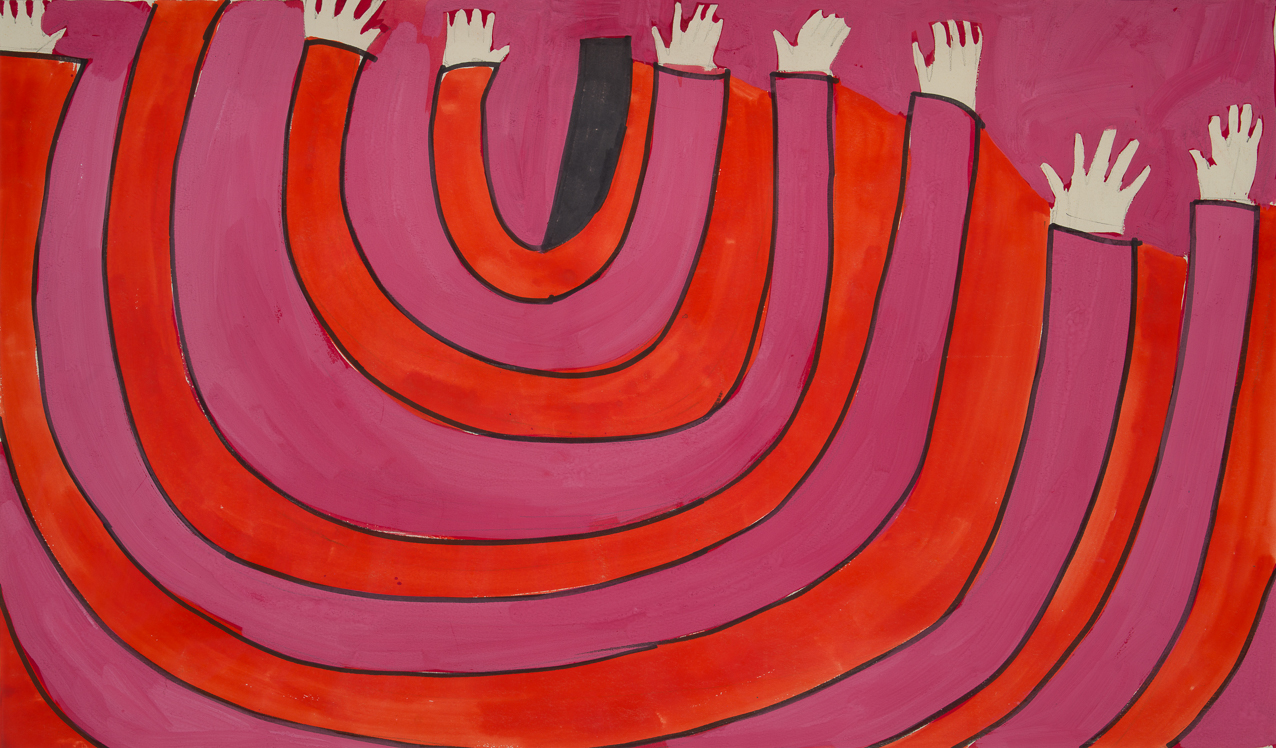
Menorah. Pencil, felt pen, gouache on paper, ≈2002.
