= Albert Besson =

Albert Besson (18 April 1896 – 17 May 1965) was a French hygienist, physician and member of the French Académie Nationale de Médecine.

== Biography ==
He was born in Montgeron. In 1916, as officer cadet, he was seriously injured at the fort Vaux, during the battle of Verdun, after saving wounded soldiers, and at first, was considered as dead.

On the way to recovery, he went back to the Faculty of Medicine of Paris, and published his first work even before the end of World War I (see below), on relationship with the war diseases. Although he was originally a bacteriologist, he defended his thesis of medicine in the service of professor Levy-Valensi, psychiatrist, who remained one of his best friends.

Elected as general councillor of Paris in 1929, and deputy chairman of the council of Paris and departement of the Seine in 1933, he returned to medicine in 1936 as general director of the Town of Paris Laboratories.

In the 1950s he promoted the vaccination against poliomyelitis, looked after the water quality for the inhabitants of Paris, obtained a law forbidding the hooter in town, and was one of the first to alert the authorities and the public about atmospheric and acoustic pollution. He was elected as a member of the French "Academie de Médecine" in 1956.

At the end of his life, he was also asked to give lectures about human habitation hygiene at the École Spéciale d'Architecture in Paris, where future empress Farah Diba was one of his students. In this time, he was also elected as a member of the Agriculture Academy.

At the Academy of Medicine, he was Professor Jean Quenu's colleague, Both had their summer residence in the fishers village of Audresselles.

Besson inspired numerous thesis topics, including summer camps, rational nutrition in school canteens, primary school vaccination, and the prevention of tuberculosis among schoolchildren.

Albert Besson was painter Maurice Boitel's father-in-law.

Sources:

- North and north-east Armees Great headquarter – general staff – order n°6,735 "D" 9 April 1918
- Bulletin of the National Academy of Medicine ( election 24 April 1956, eulogy 17 January 1967) .

== Publications ==
His main work is L'Hygiène de l'habitation, in which he made the link between medicine and architecture. At the beginning of the 20th century, slums were still numerous in the town centres, and Albert Besson put as an evidence that, dark, damp and overcrowded, they were the main source of epidemics, chiefly tuberculosis and diphtheria.

Among the European physicians, he is the theoretician of architecture with large windows and use of materials impervious to water and parasitics, architecture that was developed by Le Corbusier.

Two works of his own are registered at the institut Pasteur:

- Questions d'hygiène et de technique hospitalières: de la construction et de l'aménagement des établissements hospitaliers / par le Docteur Albert Besson; préf. de M. le Docteur Dujarric de la Rivière. – Paris: J. B. Baillière et Fils, 1951.
- Technique microbiologique et sérothérapique: (microbes pathogènes de l'homme et des animaux); guide du médecin et du vétérinaire pour les travaux de laboratoire / par le Dr Albert Besson. – 7e éd. ref. et augm.- Paris: J. B. Baillière et Fils, 1920.

A fourth edition of this last book can also be found at the Universidad de Navarra, Navarra, Spain:

- Technique microbiologique et sérothérapique: microbes pathogénes de l'homme et des animaux: guide du médecin et du veterinaire pour les travaux de laboratoire / par Albert Besson. Publicac. Paris: Librairie J.-B. Baillière et Fils. Edición 4e ed. ref. et augm.
