= Water Lilies (1919) =

1919 painting by Claude Monet

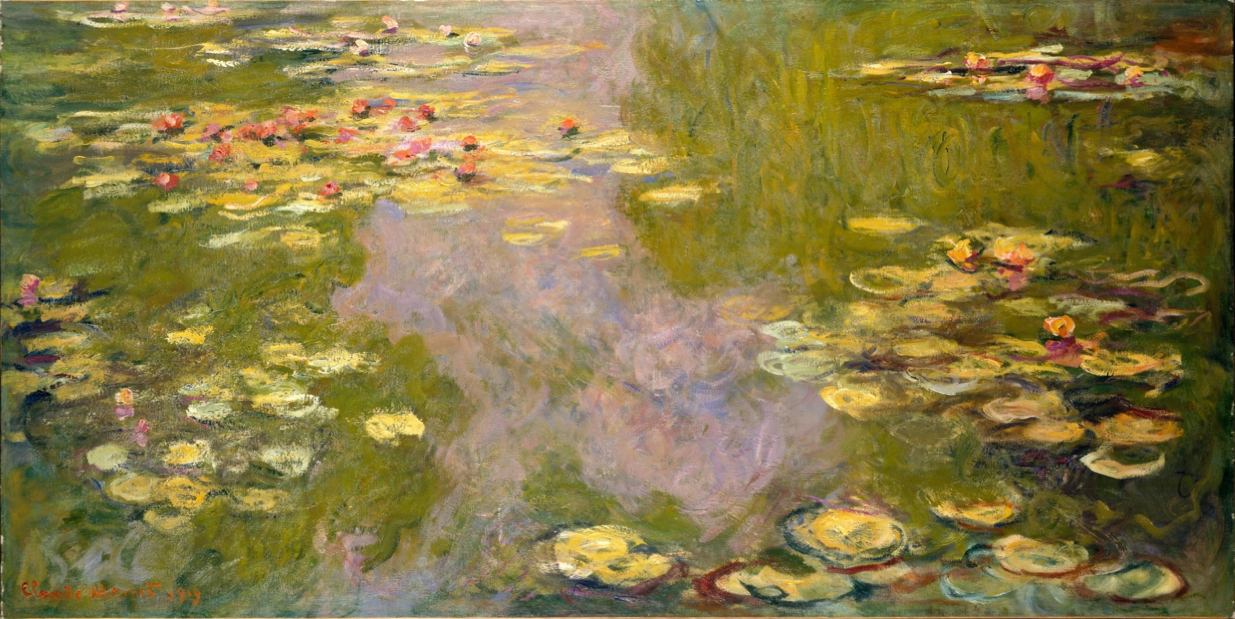
- Artist: Claude Monet
- Year: 1919
- Medium: Oil on Canvas
- Dimensions: 101 cm × 200 cm (40 in × 79 in)
- Location: Metropolitan Museum of Art; New York City

The Water Lilies is a 1919 painting by impressionist Claude Monet, one of his Water Lilies series. The painting, the left hand panel of a large pair, depicts a scene in Monet's French pond showing light reflecting off the water with water lilies on the surface. It is on display in New York's Metropolitan Museum of Art.

One of Monet's larger paintings, it shows the beauty of the sunset reflecting off the water. In 1919, Claude Monet was an elderly man who had already been painting for almost 70 years, and his Water Lilies series came during a time when he was mainly painting water lilies in his pond, the pond's bridge, and his garden.

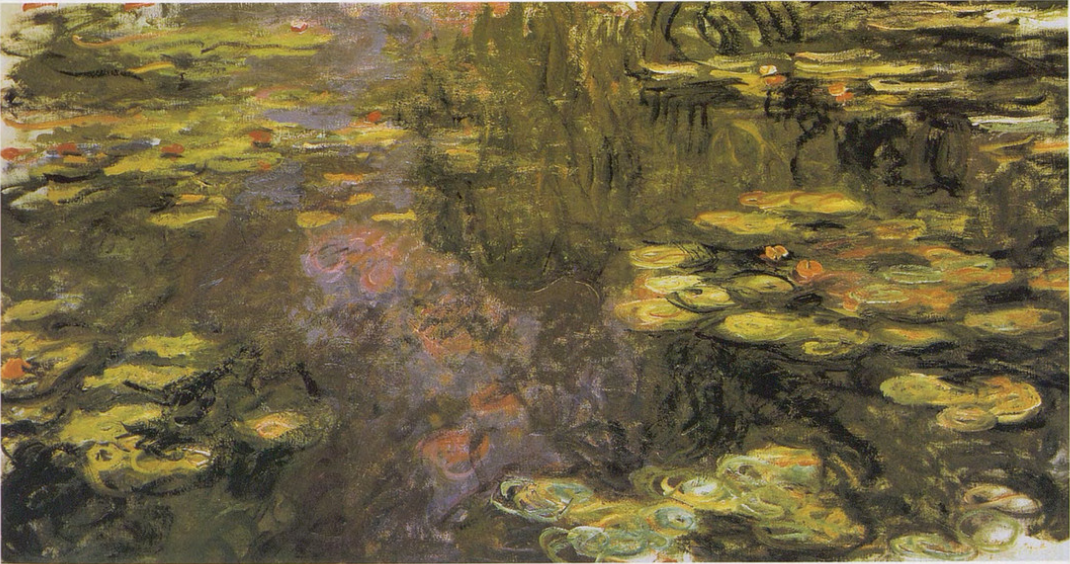
The right hand panel

== See also ==
- List of paintings by Claude Monet
