= André Vignolles =

French Contemporary artist

Mr ANDRÉ VIGNOLES
- Born: 1920; France
- Died: 2017 (aged 96–97)
- Occupation: Painter

André Vignolles was a French Contemporary artist active around France from the mid 20th century.
