= Red and Orange Streak =

Painting by Georgia O'Keeffe

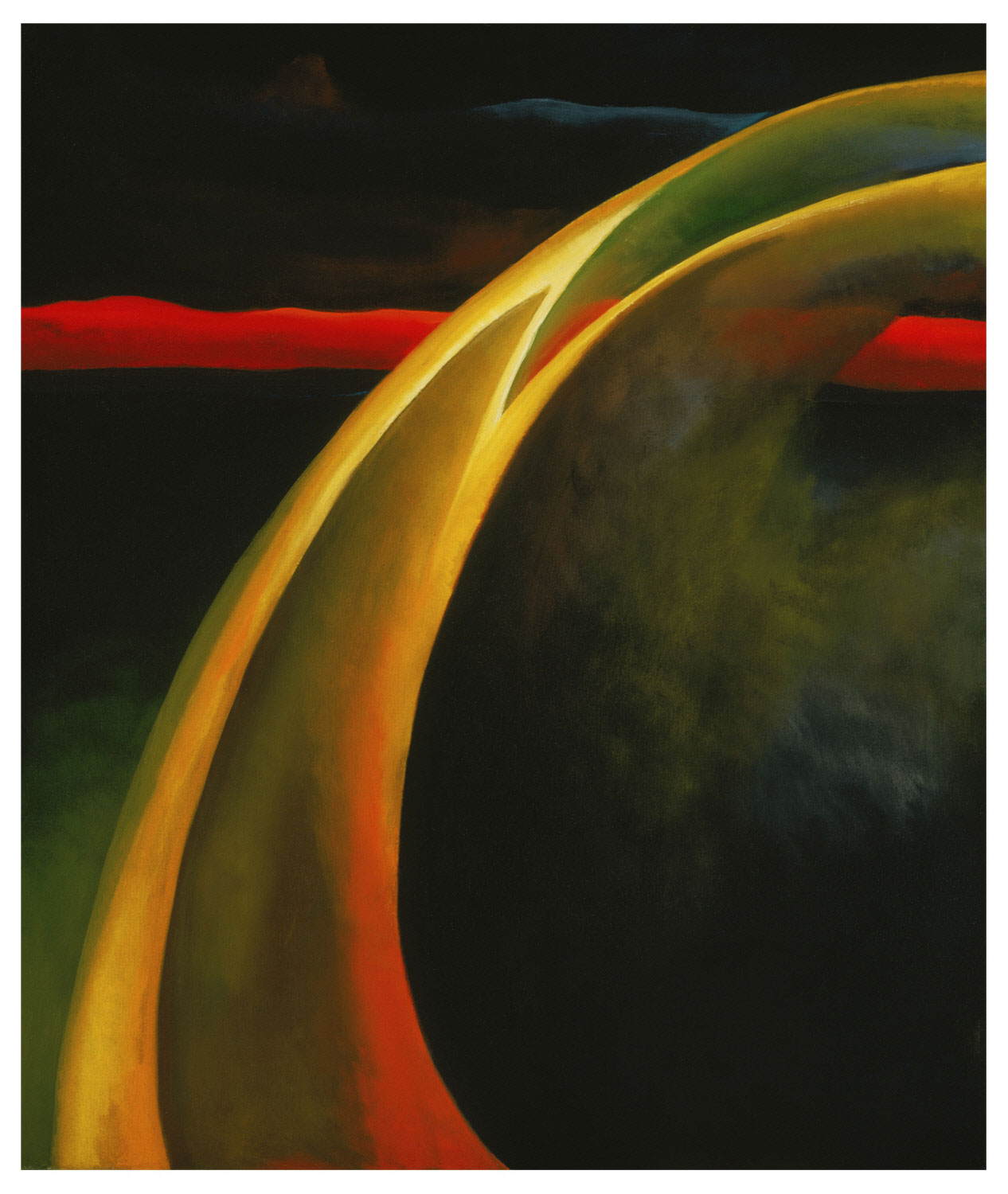
- Artist: Georgia O'Keeffe
- Year: 1919
- Medium: Oil on canvas
- Subject: Lightning
- Dimensions: 68.6 cm × 58.4 cm (27.0 in × 23.0 in)
- Location: Philadelphia Museum of Art, Philadelphia
- Accession: 1987-70-3
- Website: Red and Orange Streak; Philadelphia Museum of Art

Red and Orange Streak is a 1919 painting by Georgia O'Keeffe. She painted it in New York, after arriving there from Texas. In a letter to a friend, O'Keeffe wrote: "the whole thing—lit up—first in one place—then in another with flashes of lightning—sometimes just sheet lightning—and sometimes sheet lightning with a sharp bright zigzag flashing across—I … sat on the fence for a long time—just looking at the lightning."
