= Longship (disambiguation) =

A longship is a Nordic sea-going ship of the Viking Age.

Longship or long ship may also refer to:

== Places ==
- Longships, Cornwall, Land's End, Cornwall, England, UK; rocks off the coast

== Entertainment ==
- "The Longships" (song), 1988 song by Enya
- The Long Ships (1941 novel; Swedish: Röde Orm) adventure novel by Frans G. Bengtsson
- The Long Ships (film), 1964 film based on the 1941 novel

== Carbon capture and storage ==
- Longship, a Norwegian carbon capture and storage project

== See also ==
- List of longest ships
- Longboat (disambiguation)
