= Yves Brayer =

French painter (1907–1990)

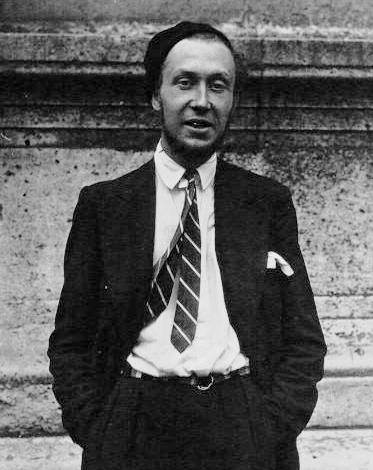
Yves Brayer (1930)

Yves Brayer (18 November 1907 – 29 May 1990) was a French painter known for his paintings of everyday life.

He was born in Versailles. He studied in Paris at the academies in Montparnasse starting in 1924, and then at the École des Beaux-Arts with Lucien Simon.

Although he was independent and never belonged to a school, he was friends with Francis Gruber, the founder of the Nouveau Réalisme school.

He first exhibited in the salons of 1927, and then traveled to Spain, where the masterpieces in the Prado Museum had a profound influence on him. After a stay in Morocco, he went to Italy, where he won the Grand Prix de Rome in 1930.

He settled back in Paris in 1934, organizing his first solo exhibition. He remained in occupied Paris during World War II.

After the war, he traveled widely to Mexico, Egypt, Iran, Greece, Russia, the United States and Japan, trying to capture the light and colors of each country. He was interested in the techniques of copper plate engraving and lithography and produced illustrations for editions of such authors as Charles Baudelaire and Paul Claudel. He also created murals and wall ornamentations, tapestry cartoons, maquettes, sets, and costumes for the Théâtre Français and the operas of Paris, Amsterdam, Nice, Lyon, Toulouse, Bordeaux, and Avignon.

In 1954 Brayer was awarded to Grand prix des Beaux-Arts de la Ville de Paris, and he was elected to the Académie des Beaux-Arts in 1957. He was president of the Salon d'Automne for five years. In 1977 he was made curator of the Musée Marmottan in Paris, a position he held for 11 years.

Brayer died in Paris in 1990.

== Books with Dust Jacket Art by Brayer ==
- Bottineau, Yves, L'Espagne (Arthaud, 1968)

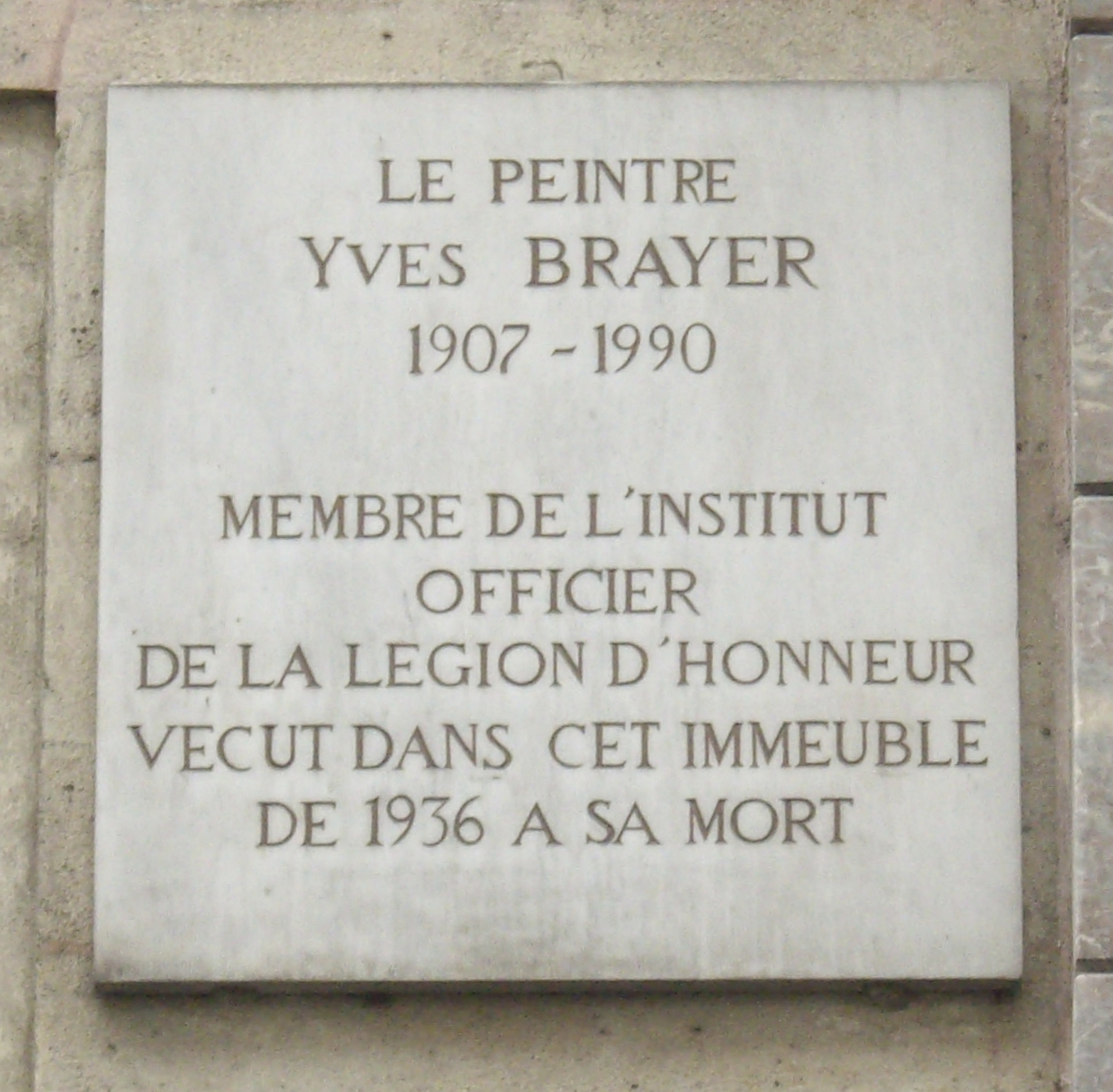
Commemorative plaque
