= Gaston Sébire =

French painter (1920–2001)

Gaston Sébire (August 18, 1920 - 2001) was a French painter of seascapes, landscapes, still lifes and flowers.

== Early life ==
Sébire was born in Saint-Samson, Calvados, and grew up in Bretteville-sur-Odon. He began to paint around eighteen years old. He studied at the Maitrise Sainte Evode in Rouen.

== Career ==
Sébire joined the Post Office, working at night and painting during the day. In 1951 Sébire moved to Paris, and one year later held his first exhibition in the city at the Galerie Visconti.

In 1953, the Marquis of Cuevas asked him to design the costumes and scenery of L’Ange gris, a ballet based on orchestrations of Claude Debussy's Suite bergamasque by André Caplet and Gustave Cloëz. During that same year Sébire won both the Prix de la Critique and the Prix Casa Valasquez, the latter giving him the opportunity to spend a year and a half working in Spain. Winning the Greenshields Foundation Prize in 1957, allowed him to continue this study for another two years.

Sébire settled in Normandy. His works from this period show influence from the Neo-Realist movement.

Sébire participated in many group exhibitions in Paris including: the Salon of Independants beginning in 1956, the Salon of Tuileres and the Comparisons Salon beginning in 1962, and the Salon des Artistes Francais beginning in 1964. The artist was also included in exhibitions of the Paris School at the Galerie Charpentie in Paris from 1953 to 1958 and in 1961, as well as the Biennale de Jeunes at the Pavillon de Marsan in 1957. His work appeared in many international shows in London with Lorjou and Clave, as well as in Munich, Washington and Japan.

In 1966 Sébire won the Grand Prix of the Biennale of Trouville. Two years later, he was awarded the Gold Medal of the Salon des Artistes Francais, as well as the Medal of Honour of the Salon de la Marine. In 1975, Sébire became the official painter of the Marine National, or French Navy, and established himself as a lithographer. Also in 1975, he was made Chevalier dans l’Order National du Merite.

A retrospective of the artist's figurative paintings was presented at the Musee de la Marine in Paris. The Amateurs Rouennais d’Art published a literary work including his biography and more than 200 of his pieces.

After a sixty-year career, Sébire died in 2001 in France.

IN 2015, a collection of Sébire's work was exhibited at the Métropol'Art.

== Solo exhibitions ==
- Galerie Gosselin, Rouen (1944)
- Galerie Visconti, Paris (1952)
- Galerie Charpentier, Paris (1956)
- Galerie Combes, Clermont-Ferrand (1961)
- Galerie Drouant, Paris (1962, 1965, 1968)
- Musee de Rouen (1964)
- Wally Findlay Gallery, New York City, and Chicago (1965)
- Wally Findlay Gallery, Paris (1965,1976,1992)
- Cultural Center, Le Mesnis-Esnard
- Retrospective, Museum of Fine Art, Rouen (1986)
- Ville de Montfermeil (1991)

== Public collections ==
- Musee d’Art Moderne in Paris
- The Chazen Museum of Art at the University of Wisconsin
- The Joe and Emily Low Art Gallery of Syracuse University
- Norwich Castle Museum and Art Gallery
- Rouen Museum of Fine Arts

== Bibliography ==
1. Osenat, Pierre: ‘Sébire’ in coll. Éloges, Les Heures Claires, Paris.
2. Osenat, Pierre: Gaston Sébire, exhibition leaflet, Palais des arts et de la culture, Brest, 1973.
3. Sébire: Mers et Jardins, exhibition leaflet, Wally Findlay Gallery, Paris, 1983.
4. Harambourg, Lydia: L'École de Paris 1945–1965. Dictionnaire des peintres, Ides et Calendes, Neuchâtel, 1993.
