= Daniel du Janerand =

French painter (1919–1990)

Daniel du Janerand (18 July 1919 – 19 July 1990) was a French painter, muralist, and book illustrator.

== Artistic life ==
He was born in the "Marais", center of Paris, on 18 July 1919. He studied at the École nationale supérieure des Beaux-Arts (National School of Fine Art) in Paris. He was a founder-member of the Salon "Comparaisons" and a member of the Salon d'Automne, Salon de la Société Nationale des Beaux Arts (Fine Arts National Society), and the Salon des Peintres Témoins de leur Temps (Painters Witnesses of their Time).

Daniel du Janerand exhibited in France, and internationally in the US, Great Britain, Belgium, Germany, Switzerland, Canada, Mexico, Italy, Spain, Russia, and Japan. His work is in museum collections in Fontainebleau, Lyon, Poitiers, Valenciennes, Villeneuve sur Lot, Créon, Gassin, and Saint-Maur des Fossés.

== Awards ==
- Prix de la revue "Le Peintre" ("The Painter" magazine) (1953)
- Prix de la Société des Amateurs d'Art et des Collectionneurs (1955)
- Prix Puvis de Chavannes (1970)
- Prix de Saint-Affrique (1984)
- Pictures bought by the State, Town of Paris, Museums of Valenciennes, Lyon, Créon, Fontainebleau

== Wall paintings ==
He created murals in French public and grammar schools; eight mural paintings for radio-industry Thomson in Paris, and in 1985, one for S.N.C.F. (French railways company) at Quimper (Brittany).

== Book illustrations ==
- "Le Chemin des Dames" by J.Rousselot
- "Feu d'artifice à Zanzibar" (Fireworks in Zanzibar) by Pierre Benoît
- "Lève-toi et marche" ("Stand up and walk") by Hervé Bazin

== His work ==
In February 1991, doing homage to Daniel du Janerand, his colleague and close friend Maurice Boitel wrote in the catalogue of the exhibition for the centenary of the Fine Arts National Society:

Daniel du Janerand left several unfinished works, including one on his easel at the time of his death. He continued to paint until his final days, moving toward a more restrained style focused on his core themes. His pastels, drawn from life, reflect the spontaneity and energy of his later work. These pieces convey an optimism that he maintained throughout his illness, and his output during this period reflects a consistent artistic vision.

Daniel du Janerand, in the conversations about our art, our life, was always lenient with the others, as the greatest. Formerly, a long time ago, we used to go together in Brie for painting. I still see him in front of his easel..."
