= Paul Collomb =

French painter

- Born: 8 October 1921; Oyonnax, France
- Died: 6 October 2010 (aged 88); Paris, France
- Occupations: Painter; Lithographer

Paul Collomb (8 October 1921 – 6 October 2010) was a French painter and lithographer. A native of Ain, he studied art in Paris before World War II. He won the Premier Second Grand Prix de Rome in 1950.

== Exhibited in salons ==
The Nude in the Armchair, 1949, oil on canvas, exhibited in Clermont-Ferrand in 2007

Landscape of Toledo, 1951, exhibited at the Salon d'Automne

The Passenger of Gois, acquired by the City of Angers in 1987

The Great Wheat Fields, Salon Comparisons of 1992

The Knitter, featured in the La Ruche exhibition at the Musée du Montparnasse in Paris in 2003

Holiday lunch, Françoise in the basket, Salon of Le Poiré-sur-Vie (Vendée) in 2003, among twelve of his paintings

Man in the Tree, The Big Umbrella, Salon de Bourges in 2003, with thirteen other works

Apple picking, Compotiers in the landscape, Cherry compote, Florist in front of the sea, 2007 Cannes Motor Show.
