= Guide to League of Nations Publications =

1951 book by Hans Aufricht

- Title page for Guide to League of Nations Publications: A Bibliographical Survey of the Work of the League, 1920—1947 (1951)
- Author: Hans Aufricht
- Subject: League of Nations history
- Published: 1951 (Columbia University Press)

Guide to League of Nations Publications: A Bibliographical Survey of the Work of the League, 1920—1947 is a book of the German-American political scientist Hans Aufricht; it is a bibliographic review of the activities of the League of Nations for the entire period of its existence; the work — that includes an introduction to the topic, a list of documents published by various organs of the League, and a “good” index — was first published in 1951.
