= UK Chagos Support Association =

- Headquarters: London
- Chair: Tom Guha

The UK Chagos Support Association was an organisation based in the United Kingdom that supported the Chagossian people in advocacy activities and lobbied to improve the welfare of Chagossian people in the UK. Its patrons included Ben Fogle and Benjamin Zephaniah. Philippa Gregory was another patron, and she also acted as secretary for the Association.

The Association supported the right for Chagossian people to return to the Chagos Islands after their expulsion and also lobbied for Chagossians to be compensated and be given access to British citizenship. It additionally worked to improve the lives of Chagossian people living in the UK. For example, in 2017, it organized a debate with parliamentary candidates in Crawley, which has the largest Chagossian population in the UK, about issues experienced by the local Chagossian community, such as difficulty finding affordable housing, the expense of obtaining a British passport, and lack of support for Chagossian children in local schools. The Association also gave out small grants to Chagossian families in financial need. In 2020, it worked with Mauritian-Chagossian artist Audrey Albert to create holiday cards whose purchase raised funds for the association.

In November 2022, the Association announced that after running for more than 20 years, it would halt operations. The closure came about because the group had primarily consisted of non-Chagossian volunteers, and they felt volunteer efforts would be of more use in supporting other organizations that had since been established by Chagossians themselves.
