= Chagossians =

People of the Chagos Archipelago and their descendants

Ilois
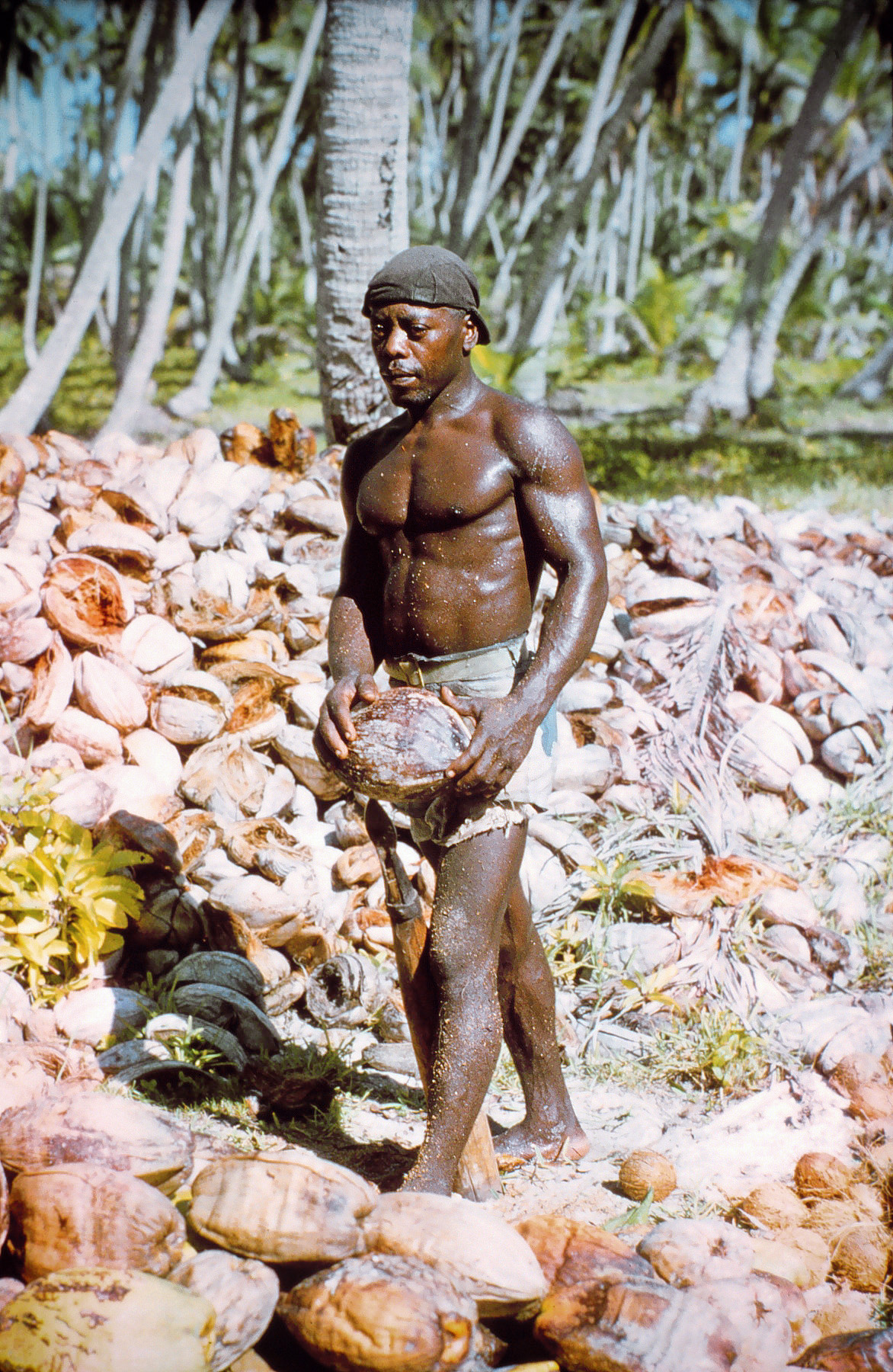
- An inhabitant of Diego Garcia in 1971, at the time of the US encampment

Total population
- c. 10,000 (2022 estimate)

Regions with significant populations
- Mauritius: c. 8,700 (2016)
- United Kingdom: c. 3,500 in Crawley (2024)
- Seychelles: c. 350 (2016)

Languages
- Chagossian Creole · Mauritian Creole · Seychellois Creole · English · French

Religion
- Predominantly Roman Catholic

Related ethnic groups
- Mauritian Creoles · Seychellois Creoles

The Chagossians, also known as Chagos Islanders or Ilois (from the French îlois, "islanders"), are the people born in the Chagos Archipelago, in the central Indian Ocean, and their descendants. The community was formed in a dependency of colonial Mauritius. The archipelago, uninhabited until the 1780s, was settled from Mauritius, then the French colony of Île de France, by planters based there, and most of the enslaved Africans and Malagasy who formed its first population arrived from Mauritius. The plantations belonged to proprietors in Mauritius, and after emancipation their workforce was supplemented by labourers recruited there and, later, in Seychelles. From 1814 until 1965 the islands were governed from Port Louis as a dependency of the colony of Mauritius. By the end of the nineteenth century a distinct island society had formed, with its own Creole. Most islanders were Roman Catholics, and their form of séga, Sega tambour Chagos, was listed by UNESCO in 2019 as intangible cultural heritage in need of urgent safeguarding.

In 1965 the United Kingdom detached the archipelago from Mauritius to form the British Indian Ocean Territory, and in 1966 it made the territory available for the defence purposes of the United Kingdom and the United States, agreeing in a confidential minute to take measures that included "resettling any inhabitants". Between 1967 and 1973 the whole population was either prevented from returning or removed, most of them to Mauritius and a minority to Seychelles, to make way for a United States military base on Diego Garcia. In Lord Hoffmann's words, "the community was left to fend for itself in the slums of Port Louis". The £650,000 that the United Kingdom paid Mauritius for their resettlement was distributed in cash in 1977–1978, and under an agreement of 1982 the United Kingdom paid a further £4 million "ex gratia with no admission of liability". The British government has since called the manner of the removal and the islanders' later treatment "shameful and wrong". In 2023 Human Rights Watch described the continuing displacement as crimes against humanity, a characterisation the government rejected.

In 2022 the British government estimated that there were about 10,000 Chagossians in the United Kingdom, Mauritius and Seychelles. Those born in the islands were citizens of the United Kingdom and Colonies, and most also became Mauritian citizens when Mauritius became independent in 1968. The British Overseas Territories Act 2002 made them British citizens, and many moved to Britain, above all to Crawley in West Sussex, home to an estimated two-thirds of the country's Chagossians. Since 2022 their descendants have been able to register as British citizens. Mauritius regards the Chagossians as its nationals.

Chagossian women led hunger strikes and demonstrations in Mauritius from 1978, and the Chagos Refugees Group, founded in about 1983 and later led by Olivier Bancoult, became the best-known of the community's organisations. Since 1975 Chagossians have brought cases in the courts of England and Wales, the United States, the European Court of Human Rights and the British Indian Ocean Territory. Their exclusion from the islands was quashed in 2000, but new orders made in 2004 were upheld by the House of Lords in 2008, and in 2016 the British government decided against resettlement. Under the 2025 treaty by which the United Kingdom agreed to recognise Mauritian sovereignty over the archipelago, Mauritius is free to implement resettlement on the islands other than Diego Garcia, and the United Kingdom is to pay £40 million into a trust fund for Chagossians; the treaty had not entered into force by November 2026. The community is divided over the treaty and over sovereignty: the Chagos Refugees Group supports it, while groups based in Britain such as Chagossian Voices and BIOT Citizens oppose it, saying that Chagossians do not primarily identify as Mauritians or that they are British. In February 2026 four Chagossians led by Misley Mandarin landed on Île du Coin in protest against the transfer. Whether the Chagossians are an indigenous people is disputed.

== Names and identity ==
Location of the Chagos Archipelago in the Indian Ocean

Those born in the archipelago came to be known by the Kreol name Ilois (French îlois), "islanders", as distinct from the contract workers from Mauritius and Seychelles who worked alongside them. The word, also written Ilwa or Zilwa in Kreol, derives from the French îlot, "islet".

In Chagos Islanders v Attorney General (2003) the High Court in London observed that the term had not always been used with "a precise or commonly agreed definition", and that the islanders had come to prefer "Chagossians" because "Ilois" had "come to have pejorative connotations"; the anthropologist David Vine notes that in exile it was often used as a slur. According to the anthropologist Laura Jeffery, the word was "already racialised and pejorative" by the 1980s; in the 1990s the Chagossian Social Committee popularised "Chagossian", which tied the community to the archipelago, and in 2011 the Mauritian government moved to replace "Ilois" with "Chagossian" in the Ilois Welfare Fund Act "to make more precise reference to the place of origin of the Chagossian community".

The two governments use the names differently: Mauritius describes the Chagossians as "Mauritian nationals" who were removed from the archipelago. The United Kingdom uses "Chagossian" on the basis that the term has "no implications for the legal status of the islands or the nationality of the Chagossians", who are "sometimes also referred to as Ilois". In 2019 the British government conceded, for the purposes of a High Court case, that the Chagossians form an ethnic group within the meaning of the Equality Act. In exile, according to Jeffery, they were given derogatory names, Ilwa or Ilois in Mauritius and anara in Seychelles.

The loss of the islands has itself become central to Chagossian identity, according to Jeffery, and Chagossians commonly describe themselves as an uprooted people (enn lepep derasine, from the French déraciner) living in exile. Islanders describe their lives in exile in terms of sagrin, tristes and mizer (sorrow, sadness and impoverishment); a study funded by the World Health Organization, cited by Human Rights Watch, described sagren as "nostalgia for the Chagos Islands" and "the profound sadness of facing the impossibility of being unable to return to one's home in the archipelago". Whether the Chagossians are an indigenous people is disputed: Minority Rights Group and Human Rights Watch regard them as one, while the British and Mauritian governments have argued that a population that originated in colonial settlement, with no continuity with any pre-colonial society, cannot be indigenous to the islands.

== Origins ==
The Chagossian community was formed in a dependency of colonial Mauritius, from which its first settlers, its owners and much of its labour came. The archipelago had no permanent inhabitants until the 1780s, when it was settled from Île de France, as Mauritius was then called: coconut plantations were established under concessions granted by the French authorities there to planters based on the island, among them Pierre Marie Le Normand, Lapotaire of Port Louis and the brothers Cayeux, and other businessmen from Mauritius followed them. Most of the enslaved people who formed the first population arrived from Mauritius, and the recorded birthplaces of some of the first ancestors include Mauritius as well as Mozambique, Madagascar and India. The plantations belonged to proprietors who lived in Mauritius, and after emancipation their workforce was supplemented by labourers recruited there and, later, in Seychelles. From 1814 until 1965 the United Kingdom administered the islands from Port Louis as a dependency of the colony of Mauritius. In the words of the diplomat and historian Nigel Wenban-Smith, the descendants of the first workforce came to form, with those of the other minor dependencies of Mauritius, "a community of islanders—the Ilois—distinct from the increasingly Indianised population of Mauritius". The two governments describe the connection differently: Mauritius says that some of the Chagossians removed from the archipelago "can trace their roots back as much as 200 years to the first 22 slaves", who arrived in 1783, while the United Kingdom has said that the islands were administered from Mauritius "purely as a matter of convenience" and had "no economic relevance to Mauritius, other than as a supplier of coconut oil and an employer of a limited number of contract labourers".

=== Enslaved Africans and Malagasy ===
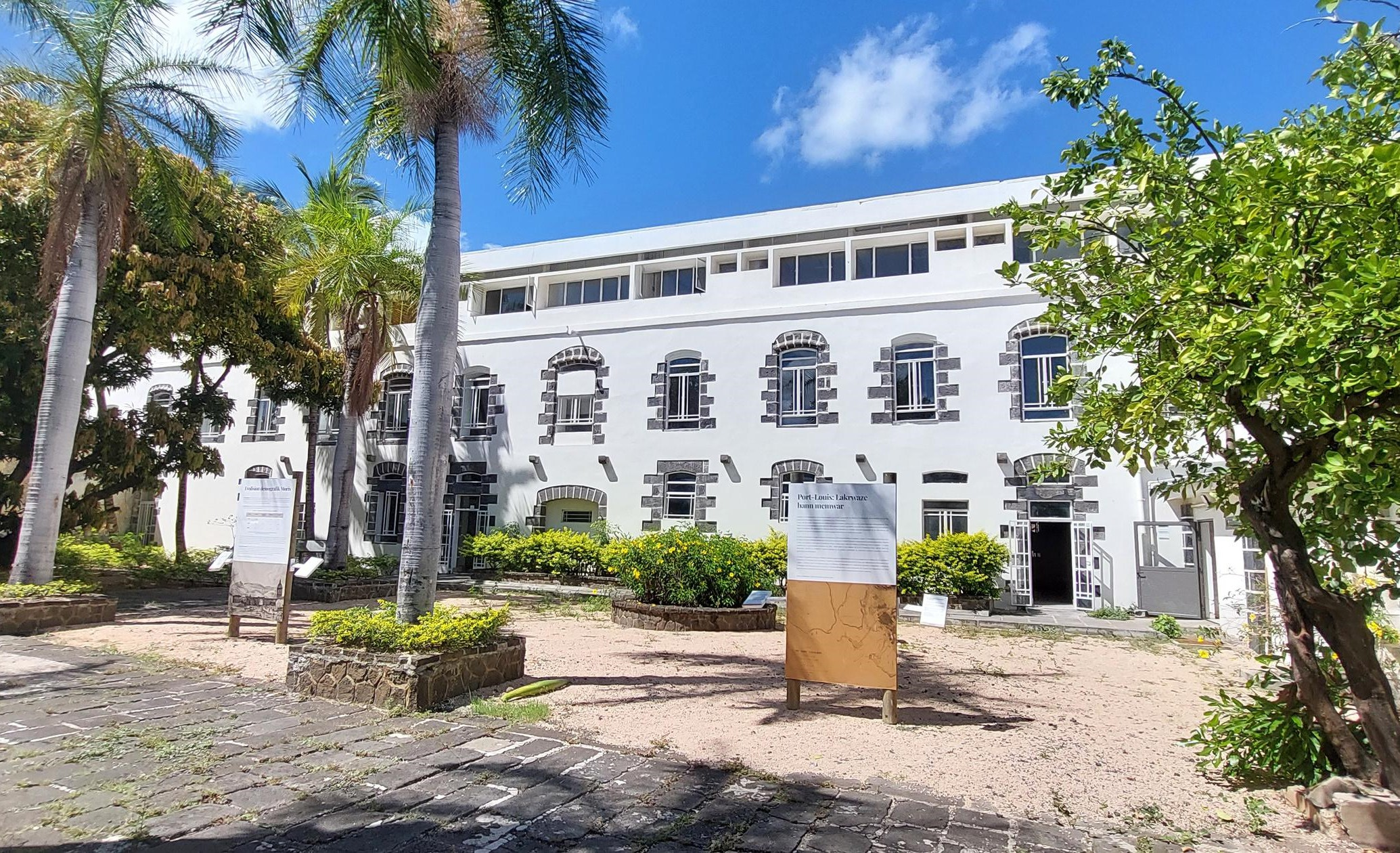
The Intercontinental Slavery Museum, in the former military hospital building in Port Louis, Mauritius, 2025

French settlers on Île de France had built a society on enslaved labour, for which the French Company of the Indies developed a slave trade from Madagascar and Mozambique; most of the people enslaved on the Chagos came from these two regions. Some may have come through Seychelles, or directly from Madagascar and the African mainland in an illegal trade that took advantage of the islands' isolation. Vine wrote that the first permanent inhabitants were probably 22 enslaved Africans brought to Diego Garcia by Le Normand around 1783, some of whose descendants are likely to be among today's Chagossians; Mauritius adopted this account in its 2012 Memorial. The Mauritian historian Satyendra Peerthum's account, from the Mauritian archives, is that Le Normand sailed from Mauritius in 1784 with 79 enslaved Mozambicans and Malagasies and a few free people of colour. (Note: Accounts of the first settlement differ: Minority Rights Group's World Directory dates the arrival of the first enslaved Ilois to 1776, and Edis places the first concessions, Le Normand's among them, in the later 1780s and regards it as unclear whether they involved permanent establishments.) Returns for 1826 recorded 377 enslaved people in the archipelago, 269 men and 108 women, with 9 white and 22 free inhabitants.

Vine sets planters' descriptions of their workforce as "happy and content" against a working day "from sunrise to sunset for six days a week", and notes that the small garden plots (petites plantations) allowed to enslaved workers were the beginnings of Chagossian land tenure. The former British Indian Ocean Territory Commissioner Richard Edis, by contrast, wrote that contemporary accounts do not suggest that the overseers actively mistreated the enslaved workers, whose tasks were relatively light.

=== Emancipation and indentured labour ===
Slavery was abolished in Mauritius and its dependencies under the Slavery Abolition Act 1833, and the period of apprenticeship that followed ended by 1840. Because freed slaves were entitled to remain in the colony where they had been freed, many continued to work on the plantations, and unlike Mauritius the archipelago saw no large-scale departure of freed people.

The Aapravasi Ghat in Port Louis, the former immigration depot through which indentured labourers entered Mauritius, 2018

Accounts differ on the share of Indian ancestry: Vine writes that Indian indentured immigration to the Chagos was relatively light and that people of African descent remained the majority. Minority Rights Group, followed by Human Rights Watch, states that of the 426 families living in the archipelago in 1900, about 60 per cent were of African-Malagasy origin and 40 per cent descended from indentured labourers from the Indian subcontinent, and a 1986 estimate by the anthropologist Iain Walker put the share of Chagossians of Tamil ancestry at perhaps 40 per cent. Further labour was recruited from Mauritius, Madagascar and Mozambique, Mauritian labourers being employed in theory on contracts of one or two years. Recruits from Mauritius who stayed on married into the families of the descendants of slaves, and after the Second World War labourers were also recruited from Seychelles, some of whom also married into island families.

=== Formation of a distinct society ===
According to Vine, a distinct society was well established by the end of the nineteenth century: the population was close to 1,000, Diego Garcia alone had six villages, a Chagos Kreol related to the creoles of Mauritius and Seychelles had emerged, and people born in the islands had become known collectively as Ilois. He attributes the islands' demographic stability after emancipation to better labour relations and "the development of a society rooted in the islands". Vine describes a distinct culture des îles fostered by the islands' isolation, which the former Governor of Mauritius Sir Robert Scott called a system peculiar to the Lesser Dependencies, "indigenous and spontaneous in its emergence".

Scott also wrote, however, that the population had been "drafted to the lesser Dependencies in the first place because there was work for it there", and that "It was not a natural island society". In 1964 the Colonial Office official Robert Newton found "little trace of the sense of a distinct Diego Garcian community". Jeffery has argued that registration forms collected by the Chagos Refugees Group in the early 2000s strongly suggest that Chagossians share descent from a small number of common ancestors.

== Life in the islands ==
=== Work and the plantations ===
Coconuts (left, early 1970s) and dried coconut kernel, or copra (right, 2006), in Seychelles. On the Chagos plantations men gathered and husked a daily quota of coconuts, women broke the nuts and extracted the kernels, and the dried kernels were ground in donkey-driven mills.

The plantations were run by companies based in Mauritius until 1962, when they were sold to Chagos Agalega Ltd, a company formed in Seychelles. Island life was organised around the plantations, which, in the words of the High Court, the companies ran "in a somewhat feudal manner": the company was almost the only employer, and it provided rations, a small dispensary, limited schooling and a priest, while the manager, as a peace officer, could imprison insubordinate labourers. Most men collected and husked coconuts, 500 or more a day, while most women shelled them with a special knife, the kuto dekoke; the kernels were dried in a heated shed, the kalorifer. Children often began work early, after at best a rudimentary education.

By the 1960s men harvesting coconuts earned about £2 a month and the women who shelled them less than half that, with rations of rice or flour, coconut oil, salt, lentils, fish and wine, and everyone was guaranteed work and a pension on retirement. A visiting official of the Mauritian Labour Office described labour relations in 1949 as "patriarchal", "a system of benevolent rule with privileges and no rights". In 1931 a three-month strike and revolt on Peros Banhos ended when a magistrate arrived from Mauritius with police and 36 islanders were convicted.

=== Housing, food, health and education ===
Housing was free, and from the late nineteenth century labourers at East Point could build their own houses, of wood and coconut thatch, with materials supplied by the management. Rations were supplemented by gardens, pigs and poultry, and by fishing for fish, octopus, sea cucumber and turtles. By 1900 Diego Garcia had a hospital on each arm of the atoll, and in the 1960s Peros Banhos had an eight-bed hospital, but serious cases had to go to Mauritius. The colonial government in Mauritius set up nurseries and schools in the mid-twentieth century.

Vine describes a plantation society that nonetheless provided "a secure life, generally free of want". In 2003 the High Court accepted as "a reasonably accurate picture of life in the 1960s on Chagos", though seen "through longing eyes", a Chagossian witness's account of houses with gardens, varied work, no unemployment and "a community life, peculiar to the islands, which had their own food, drink, games and festivities". Newton, by contrast, reported in 1964 that most of the inhabitants of Diego Garcia "would gladly work elsewhere if given the opportunity".

=== Family, women and religion ===
Women were a minority for much of the islands' history: there were 108 enslaved women to 269 men in 1826, and in the mid-nineteenth century women rarely made up more than 20 per cent of the population. Vine writes that the imbalance had generally evened out by the mid-twentieth century and may help to explain the authority Chagossian women came to exercise, though Edis records that women were still a minority on Diego Garcia in the 1950s. Many couples lived together without formal marriage, locally called being "married from behind the kitchen", and the efforts of the visiting Catholic priest Roger Dussercle to change this in the 1930s had little success. Jeffery describes a matrifocal system of female-headed households, akin to that of Creoles in Seychelles, which largely persisted in exile; Minority Rights Group describes Chagossian society as "traditionally matrilineal".

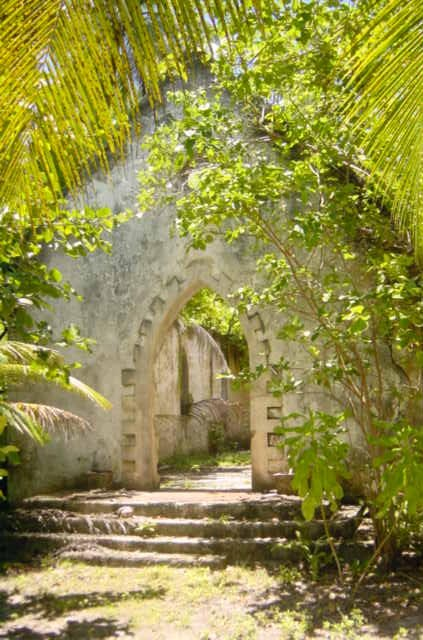
The abandoned church on Boddam Island, in the Salomon Islands, in 2008. Most islanders were Roman Catholics.

Most islanders were Roman Catholics, although religious practices and beliefs of African, Malagasy and Indian origin persisted. There was no resident priest: a priest visited about once a year for baptisms and weddings, and the administrators held weekly services in between. Non-Christian funeral rites, intended to stop the dead from haunting the living, were still practised in the 1930s, to Dussercle's dismay. Jeffery identifies the rite as aniwawa, thought to be of African or Malagasy origin, which releases the spirit of the dead (nam) so that it does not become a jab, a spirit stuck in purgatory; it was still performed in Mauritius in 2006.

=== Links with Mauritius and Seychelles ===
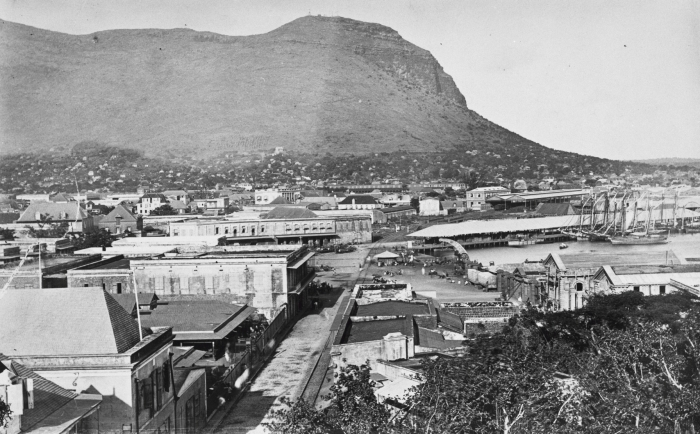
The harbour of Port Louis, Mauritius, photographed between 1870 and 1890

The islands' economy was tied to Mauritius: most of the copra was produced for the Mauritian market, and Vine calls the archipelago "a colony of a colony". From 1935 a regular steamer linked the islands with Mauritius four times a year, replacing twice-yearly boats. The ship, run by the companies' agent with a subsidy from the Mauritius government, carried workers going on leave or needing medical treatment, and expectant mothers often went to Mauritius to give birth; by the 1960s workers had regular holidays with free passage to Mauritius. Families were linked across the two places: some children left for Mauritius, where relatives might live, and a Foreign Office paper of 1969 noted that the men went to Mauritius, "where many have family connexions", and that the Ilois "still regard themselves as Mauritians" but "also look on themselves as Chagos islanders".

Church and state services also came from Mauritius: the Anglican Bishop of Mauritius visited in 1859 and Catholic priests in 1875 and 1884, and from 1933 the Archbishop of Port Louis sent Dussercle, who preached in Creole. In 1964 Newton recorded that magistrates from Mauritius inspected the islands about once a year and that the Mauritius government supplied schoolteachers, midwives and dispensers, though he described the administrative connection as tenuous.

While the archipelago was a dependency of Mauritius, births, marriages and deaths there were registered under Mauritian law: under an 1875 ordinance each island's manager could be appointed an officer of the civil status, notifying them to the Registrar General of Mauritius, and the United Kingdom has likewise described the managers as "Civil Status Officers" responsible for recording them. The British Indian Ocean Territory Administration retained the records made between 1878 and 1971, and has digitised them. The Civil Status Office in Mauritius also holds records of people born in the archipelago, and Mauritian law keeps copies of the 1965–1973 entries, certified in Seychelles, as a permanent record in Port Louis. In 2022 Olivier Bancoult said that the islanders' birth certificates record that the islands were a dependency of Mauritius until 1965. (Note: In French: «Jusqu'à 1965 nous étions une dépendance de Maurice, ce qui est écrit sur nos actes de naissance.»)

Ties with Seychelles grew in the twentieth century: by 1964, 311 of Diego Garcia's 483 inhabitants were Seychellois, and Newton considered that the islands were being drawn into the Seychelles sphere of influence, with "nothing remotely resembling life in modern Mauritius".

== Culture ==
=== Language ===
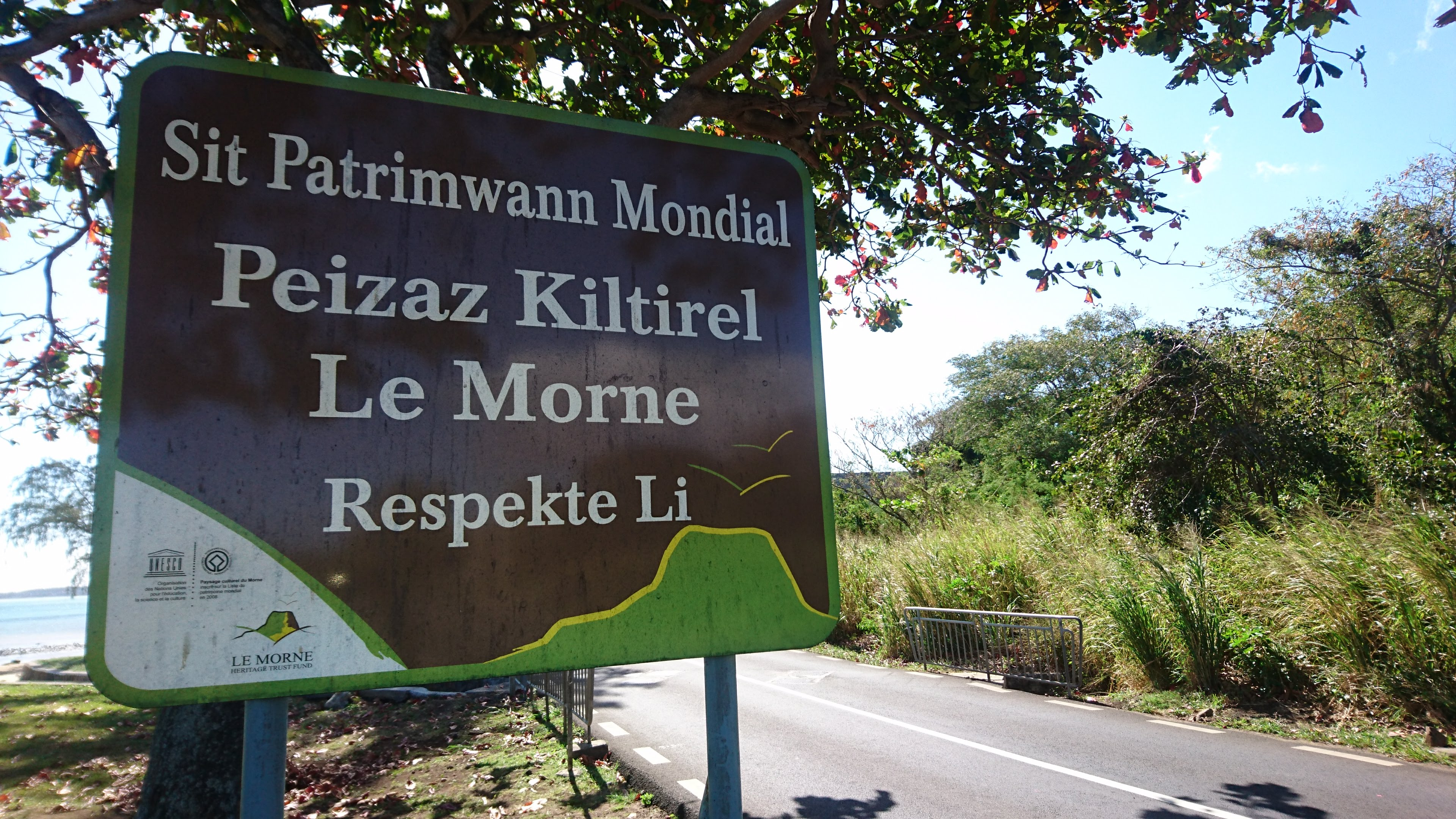
An anti-littering sign in Mauritian Creole, 2018. Chagossian Creole is related to the creoles of Mauritius and Seychelles.

The enslaved workers would soon have adopted Creole as a common language, and by the end of the nineteenth century a Chagos Kreol related to those of Mauritius and Seychelles had emerged. It is a French-lexified creole with a mainly Bantu and Malagasy substrate; one study found the islanders' speech closest to that of conservative speakers of Rodriguan Creole, to which speakers themselves claim a similarity, while others have argued that it has become increasingly aligned with Mauritian Creole. According to Walker, "One distinctive feature of the Ilois Kreol is the extensive vocabulary pertaining to the coconut palm and the copra industry". A Mauritian Kreol dictionary of 2011 lists some 30 Chagossian words, such as sipay (coconut crab).

Since the expulsion, all Chagossians speak their creole as a heritage language, "far removed from their native shores". No reliable figures for speakers exist and little research has been published; a 2024 survey by linguists and members of the UK group Chagossian Voices rated the language's vitality at 6b on the Expanded Graded Intergenerational Disruption Scale and called for a research agenda led by the community.

=== Music and dance ===
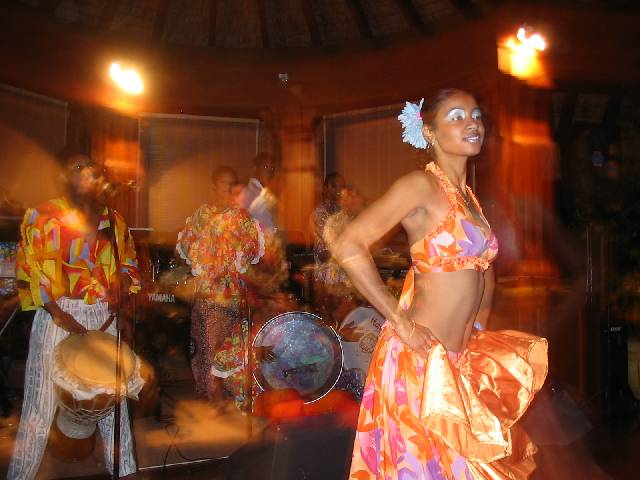
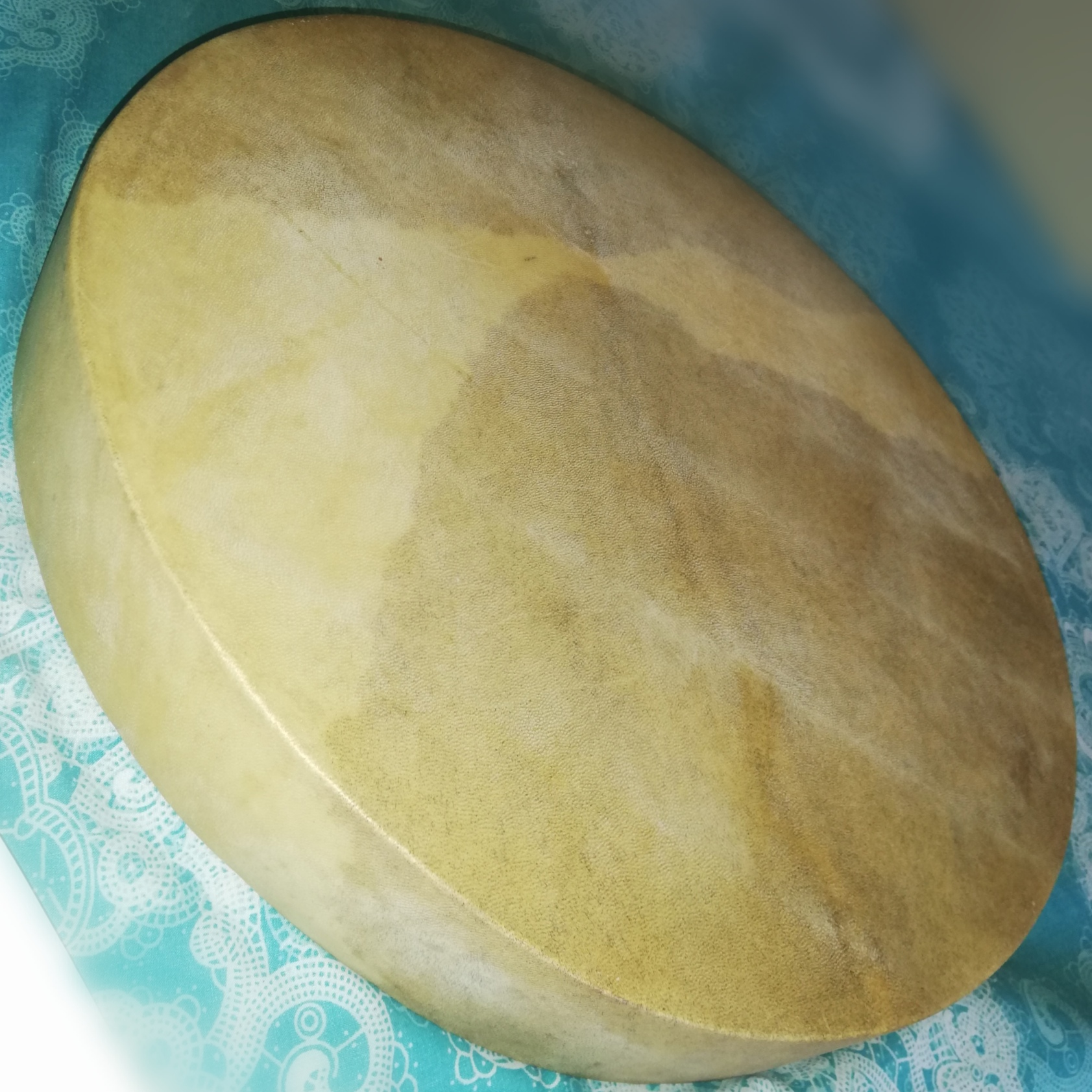
A woman dancing the séga in Mauritius in 2004 (left), and a ravanne, a goatskin frame drum (right). In Chagossian séga, the drum, also called tambour, is heated over a fire before it is played.

The characteristic music and dance of the islands was the séga, whose name probably derives from the Mozambican tschiéga and the Malagasy chéga; Edis traces the dance to central Mozambique, the origin of many of the islanders. On Saturday nights the islanders gathered around a fire, where drummers heated their goatskin ravanne drums and began a slow beat; soloists sang verses, and dancers, musicians and onlookers joined in the chorus, often until morning. Other instruments included the triangle, rattles, a musical bow (bobre), the one-stringed makalapo and zez, and the accordion.

Songs were often composed during the working week and sung on Saturday; their themes included misery, happiness, sadness and rebellion, and a person mocked in one song might reply with another. Vine and Jeffery identify love, separation, loss, work, colonial violence and sexual exploitation among their themes; songs composed in exile added the displacement and calls for return. The Catholic Church disapproved of séga, and in 1937 a manager's attempt to ban it on Salomon, during which the drums were confiscated, led to an insurrection. Chagossian dancers distinguish their style from Mauritian séga: women wear skirts and underskirts that conceal their legs and a headscarf (konde), keep their feet flat on the ground, said to come from dancing on sand, and dance to a slower tempo.

In exile, the Chagos Refugees Group formed a Chagos Tambour Group in 2002, which performed at Creole festivals and recorded albums in 2004 and 2018, after an earlier album in 1985; a youth group, Tambour Chagos Junior UK, was formed in Crawley in 2017. In 2004 the Pôle régional des musiques actuelles of Réunion released Charlésia, la voix des Chagos, recordings of Charlesia Alexis and her musicians made in Mauritius in 2003, which received a coup de cœur from the Académie Charles Cros. Mauritius's national inventory lists among the art's practitioners Charlesia Alexis, Lisette Talate and Rita Bancoult, all of whom had died by 2018. In 2019, on a nomination by Mauritius, UNESCO inscribed Sega tambour Chagos on its List of Intangible Cultural Heritage in Need of Urgent Safeguarding, describing it as "one of the types of Sega music of Mauritius, with origins in the Chagos Archipelago", "born from slavery" and played on a heated drum, the tambour. The committee found that it served Chagossians as "a source of social and group cohesion, identity retention, self-confidence and pride", but that displacement, poverty, the death of elders and the misappropriation of lyrics by non-Chagossians threatened it, and that "only one group consistently performs it on the island".

=== Food and crafts ===
Chagossian drinks included baka, fermented from grain or lentils, and kalou, fermented coconut-palm sap, which were shared at séga parties; a common dish was seraz, fish in coconut milk. The Chagossian vocabulary in the Mauritian dictionary also names other brews, stews and coconut cakes, coconut-leaf baskets (kapas) and brooms (zig). The islands produced wooden toys, model boats, brooms and brushes from coconut palms, and Salomon was known for its boatbuilding. Drums were made from goat, donkey, ray or shark skin, though Chagossian drummers now generally use goatskin or synthetic drums made in Mauritius. Workshops held in 2017–2018 to pass on Chagossian cuisine, coconut handicrafts and medicinal plants found these harder to transmit in the United Kingdom, where ingredients and coconut fronds are scarce.

=== Religion and festivals ===
Dussercle celebrated Christmas midnight mass under the stars at East Point, after which the whole population walked in procession round the settlement. The feast of the Assumption on 15 August and the New Year, for which people traditionally wore new clothes, were marked with séga. Chagossians say that the makalapo sounds of its own accord, especially on All Souls' Day, as a message from the ancestors buried underground. In exile, séga is performed at events such as the Festival International Kreol and Chagos Day in Mauritius, and in 2017 a Chagossian Day was held at Crawley Library during Black History Month.

=== Sport ===
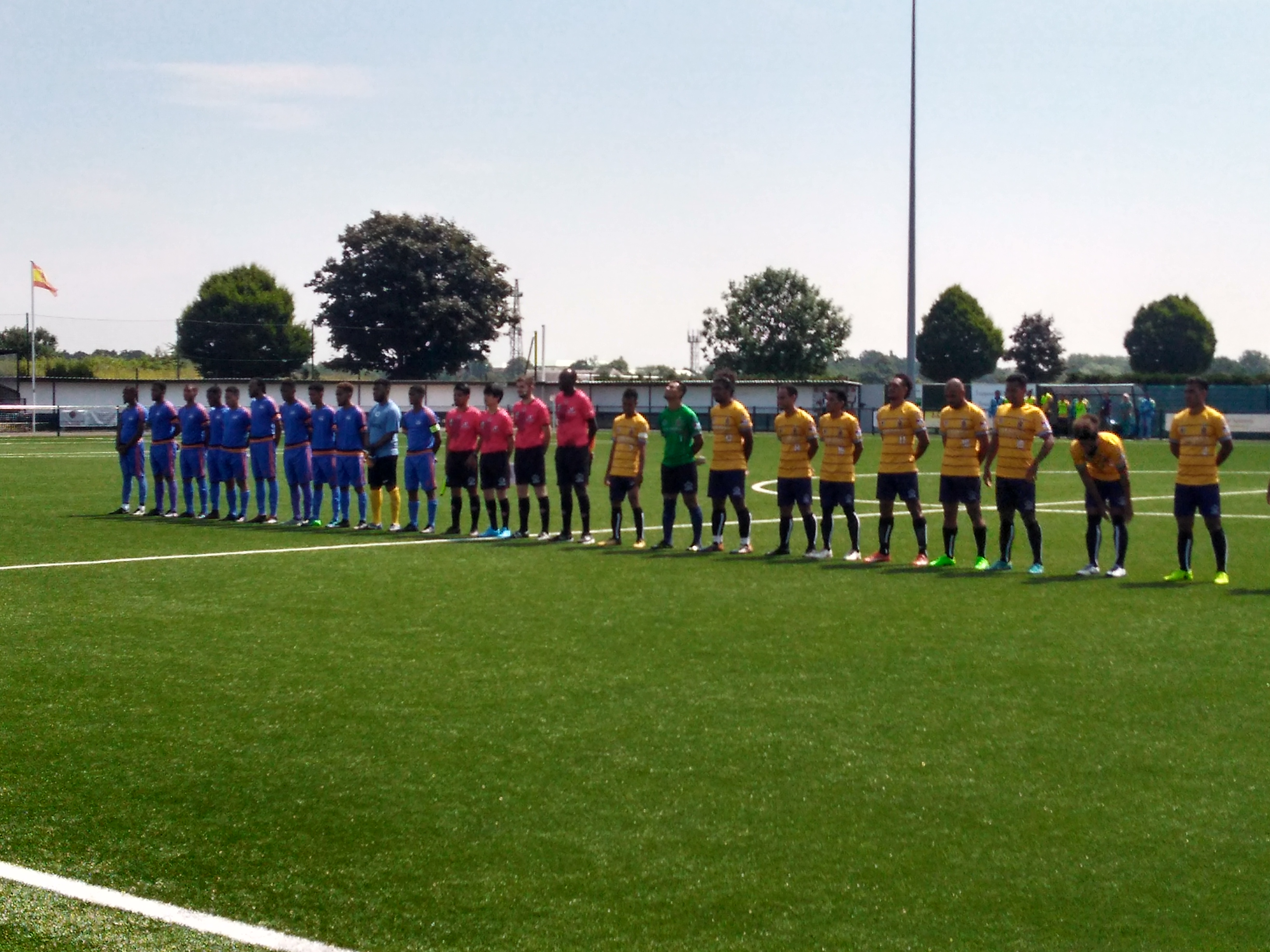
The Chagos Islands and Tuvalu teams lining up for their national anthems, 9 June 2018

Holidays on the islands were marked by sports days with donkey races, sack races, tug of war and swimming competitions. Scott, visiting Diego Garcia in 1955, saw the islanders play football "with an obvious and noisy consciousness that the match was for real and in earnest". In 2009 a team called Chagos Island was playing in the bottom division of the Crawley and District Football League. A Crawley-based Chagos Islands team, most of whose players had never been to the islands, crowdfunded its way to the 2016 ConIFA World Football Cup in Abkhazia, where it lost all its games.

== Population before the expulsion ==
Census and survey figures from 1883 onwards give no separate count of the Ilois. The archipelago had about 760 inhabitants in 1880, about 400 of them on Diego Garcia, and approached 1,000 by 1900; according to Wenban-Smith it peaked at 1,158 in 1952 and fell to around 900 in the 1960s. Figures accepted by the High Court show a fall to 747 in 1962, as low wages, monotonous work and isolation discouraged recruitment.

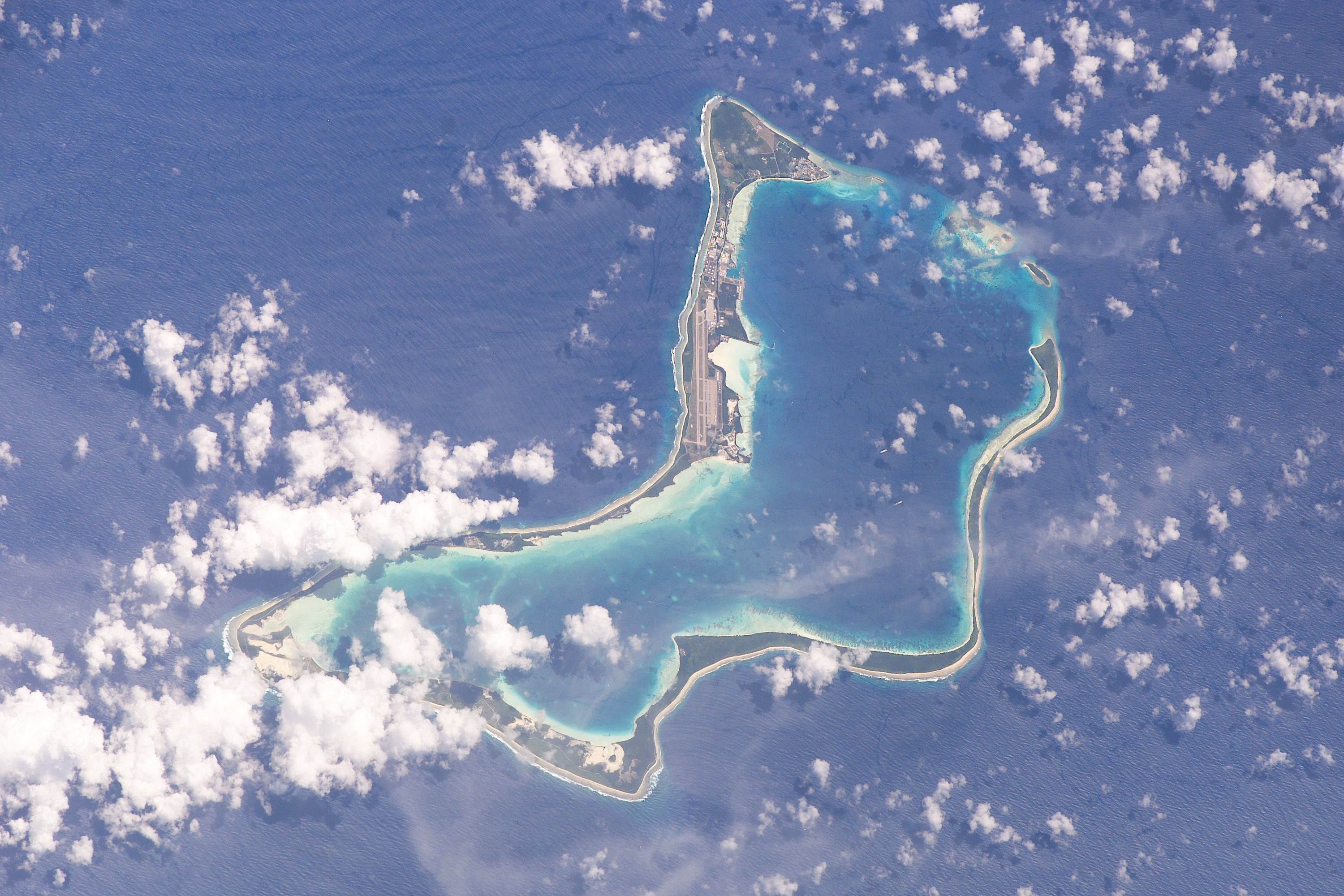
Diego Garcia (left, 2003), Peros Banhos (centre, false-colour image, 2003) and the Salomon Islands (right, 2001), seen from space. The 1964 Anglo-American survey counted 993 people on these three atolls.

The 1964 Anglo-American survey counted 993 people on the three inhabited atolls: 483 on Diego Garcia, of whom 311 were Seychellois, 291 on Peros Banhos and 219 on Salomon; its total of 1,364 included 371 people on Agaléga. Official counts of the Ilois, which the court called "neither a readily defined nor ascertained category", ranged from 343 to 487 between 1967 and 1971. For 1965 the arbitral tribunal in Mauritius v United Kingdom, following the 1964 survey's total, put the number of residents at about 1,360, and the Chagossian population, including people born in the islands, at between 1,500 and 1,750.

Whether the islands had a permanent population became a central question: in 1965 the Colonial Secretary described the islands as having "few if any permanent inhabitants", and a Foreign Office memorandum stated that "none of them should be regarded as being permanent inhabitants of the islands". A Foreign Office paper of 1969 acknowledged that "Some are second generation, a few third" and that the Ilois "can be regarded as having their main roots in Chagos", but in 1970 a legal adviser listed among the aims of an immigration ordinance "to maintain the fiction that the inhabitants of Chagos are not a permanent or semi-permanent population". In 2000 the Divisional Court found that the papers showed "the concern of the British authorities to present to the outside world a scenario in which there were no permanent inhabitants". Before the International Court of Justice, Mauritius said that the United Kingdom had denied a permanent population "contrary to what it well knew to be the facts", and that the Chagossians "have always been, and are citizens of Mauritius"; the United Kingdom said that it "regrets not putting before the United Nations in the 1960s a complete picture as to the number of second and third generation inhabitants".

== Expulsion (1967–1973) ==
In 1965 the United Kingdom detached the archipelago from the colony of Mauritius to form the British Indian Ocean Territory (BIOT). By notes exchanged with the United States on 30 December 1966 it made the territory available for the defence purposes of both governments, and a confidential Agreed Minute listed "resettling any inhabitants" among the administrative measures it was to take. Islanders who went to Port Louis in 1967 and 1968 on leave, at the end of their contracts or for medical treatment were refused passage home. The High Court held in 2003 that "The UK Government compelled the closure of Diego Garcia and the removal of the Ilois from it", and that the resulting economic decline led to the later departures from the other atolls.

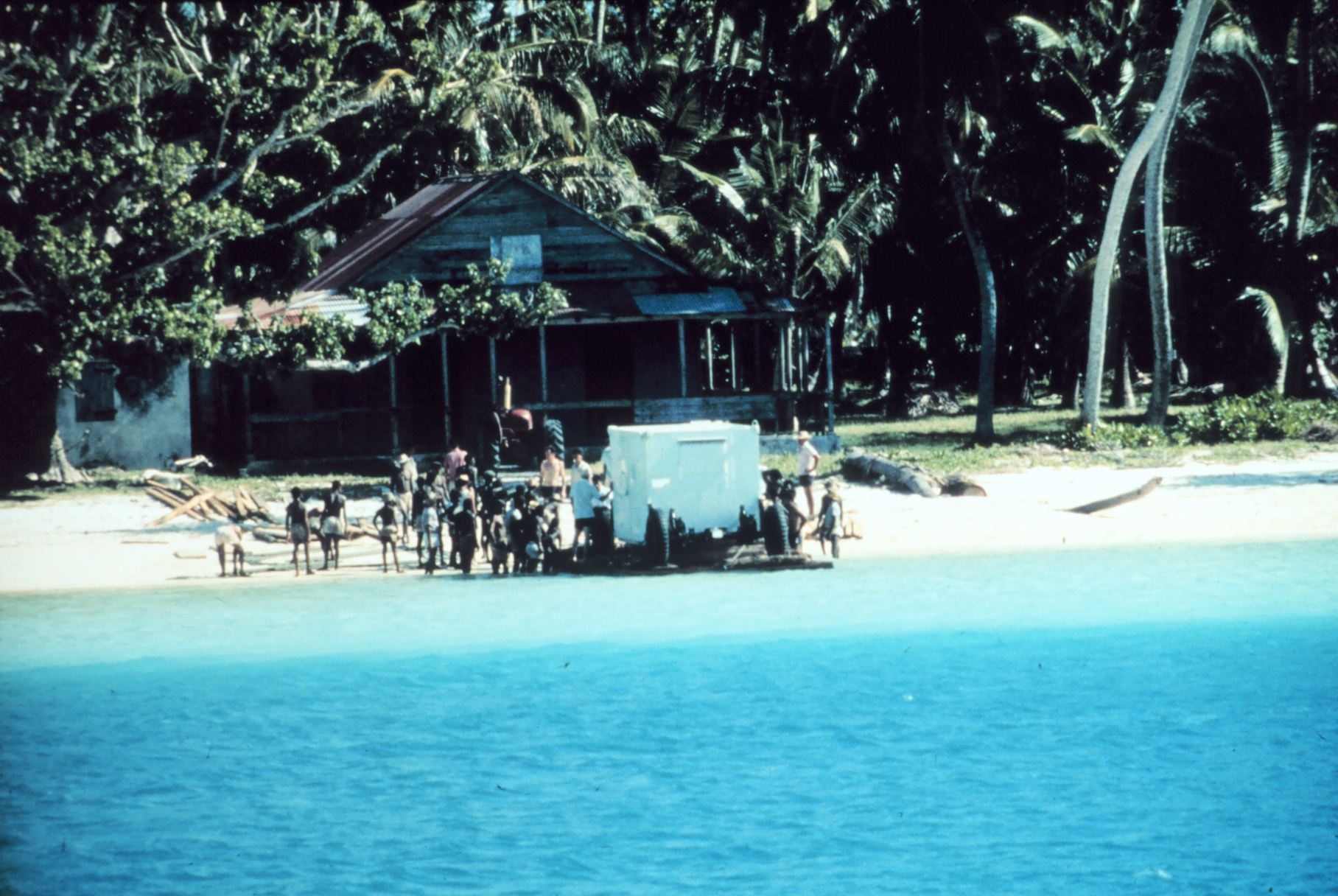
Ilois helping US personnel to bring equipment ashore on Diego Garcia, 1971

The Immigration Ordinance of 16 April 1971 made it unlawful to enter or remain in the territory without a permit. Lord Hoffmann said in 2008 that there was no evidence that it had been used to expel anyone; those who left did so because the alternative was "being abandoned without support or supplies". Between July and October 1971 the cargo ship Nordvaer and the schooner Isle of Farquhar took the people of Diego Garcia to Peros Banhos and the Salomon Islands or to Seychelles and Mauritius. As the remaining plantations closed, the people of Salomon and Peros Banhos were shipped to Mauritius in 1972 and 1973; the last voyage left Peros Banhos on 26 May 1973.

The High Court described the voyage to Mahé in 1971 as "dreadful", leaving "many bitter memories of the horses being better cared for than the passengers"; in Mahé the islanders were lodged in an unused part of the prison before sailing on to Port Louis. According to Vine, the Nordvaer had space for 72 passengers but carried 146 on its last voyage from Diego Garcia, and two women were reported to have miscarried. When it reached Port Louis in April 1973, its passengers at first refused to disembark because "they had nowhere to go, no money and no employment"; they were offered accommodation in the Dockers Flats area and a small sum of money. The International Court of Justice found in 2019 that the whole population had been "either prevented from returning or forcibly removed and prevented from returning by the United Kingdom". The British government has accepted that the removal was carried out "with a callous disregard of their interests", and told the court that the manner of the removal and the islanders' later treatment "was shameful and wrong".

== Exile and diaspora ==
=== Mauritius ===
Port Louis, the capital of Mauritius, seen from the citadel in 2019. Most of the islanders were taken to Mauritius.

The islanders arrived in a country with high unemployment and widespread poverty; most were illiterate, spoke only Creole and knew only plantation work. The High Court found that no resettlement scheme awaited them, that "extreme poverty routinely marked their lives", and that their background exposed them to insults and discrimination. Jeffery writes that in Mauritius Chagossians tend to be classed as a minority within the Creole community, itself a minority, and that ethnic discrimination, especially in the first decades, hampered their access to housing and jobs. In Lord Hoffmann's words, "the community was left to fend for itself in the slums of Port Louis". Chagossian communities remain in poorer districts around Port Louis, such as Roche Bois, described in 2023 as an impoverished suburb, and Baie du Tombeau, where in 2025 some still lived in corrugated-iron houses; the Chagos Refugees Group has its headquarters at Pointe aux Sables.

In October 1974 a petition from Ilois representatives to the British High Commission said that forty of them had died "through sorrow, poverty, lack of food and care". Vine records that one group counted at least 44 deaths by 1975 "because of unhappiness, poverty and lack of medical care". Chagossians attribute some of these deaths to sagren, the grief of separation from their homeland.

The £650,000 that the United Kingdom paid to Mauritius in 1973 for resettlement went unused for years; reduced by inflation, it was distributed in cash, with interest, in 1977 and 1978 to 595 families. After a damages claim in London (Vencatessen v Attorney General), an agreement of 7 July 1982 provided £4 million from the United Kingdom, paid "ex gratia with no admission of liability", and land worth £1 million from Mauritius. The money was disbursed by an Ilois Trust Fund set up by Mauritian statute, with five Ilois on its board, and in 1983 and 1984 just over £4 million was paid to 1,344 Ilois. On collecting the final instalment most signed or thumbprinted a renunciation of further claims, which the High Court described as "a one-page legal document, written in legal English, without a Creole translation".

Since 2010 Mauritius has marked 3 November as a day of commemoration of the Chagossians' uprooting. The Mauritian government says that Chagossians, "as full-fledged citizens of Mauritius", have the same rights as other citizens, and that it gives them extra help through the Chagossian Welfare Fund, whose board includes elected community representatives and which provides scholarships, house repairs, medical check-ups and funeral grants. In 2023 the fund, overseen by Olivier Bancoult, was reported to receive an annual government grant of seven million rupees. In 2025 the Committee on the Elimination of Racial Discrimination noted these measures, including land allocation, but remained concerned about "the ongoing effects of forced displacement, including poverty and discrimination". In December 2025 its cabinet approved a bill for a Trust Fund for the Benefit of Chagossians, to be capitalised with £40 million from the United Kingdom under the 2025 treaty and run by a board with a Chagossian majority.

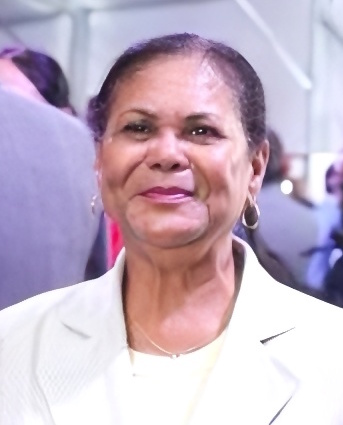
Arianne Navarre-Marie, a Chagossian who is the current Deputy Prime Minister and Minister of Gender Equality and Family Welfare of Mauritius

Arianne Navarre-Marie, born to Chagossian parents, is Deputy Prime Minister of Mauritius and Minister of Gender Equality and Family Welfare. Her father came from Six Islands and her mother was born on Diego Garcia; she was born in Port Louis and grew up in the Dockers Flats at Baie-du-Tombeau, where, she recalled, Chagossian families occupied five of the blocks. A member of the Mauritian Militant Movement, she was first elected to the National Assembly in 1982 at the age of 21, was minister for women's rights, child development and family welfare from 2000 to 2005, and has held the gender equality and family welfare portfolio since November 2024. On 4 May 2026 the President, Dharam Gokhool, acting on the advice of the Prime Minister, appointed her Deputy Prime Minister, and she was sworn in on 6 May, keeping her ministry; she is the first woman to hold the office. The Prime Minister, Navin Ramgoolam, highlighted the significance of appointing someone born to Chagossian parents "in the context of ongoing discussions relating to the Chagos Archipelago", and called her appointment "un signal fort" (a strong signal).

Chagossians interviewed by Human Rights Watch in 2021 and 2022 described discrimination in Mauritius, and a 2021 communication from United Nations experts stated that "information received indicates a specific experience of racial discrimination against the exiled Chagossian population". Claudette Lefade, a former member of the Chagos Refugees Group who leads Chagos Asylum People in Roche Bois, regards Bancoult as beholden to the government that funds the welfare fund, and cites the alleged mismanagement of the 1972 and 1982 payments. In a 2025 survey by a House of Lords committee, many respondents, mostly in the United Kingdom, distrusted the Mauritian government, some saying that it had neglected its Chagossian minority, though about half of those in Mauritius expressed some confidence in it. The Mauritian government rejects these accusations: in November 2025 the Prime Minister, Navin Ramgoolam, called press reports that Chagossians were mistreated in Mauritius "faussetés" (falsehoods), and in December the Attorney General, Gavin Glover, said that the Lords survey amplified the voices most opposed to the treaty, while most Chagossians in Mauritius supported the Mauritian role.

=== Seychelles ===
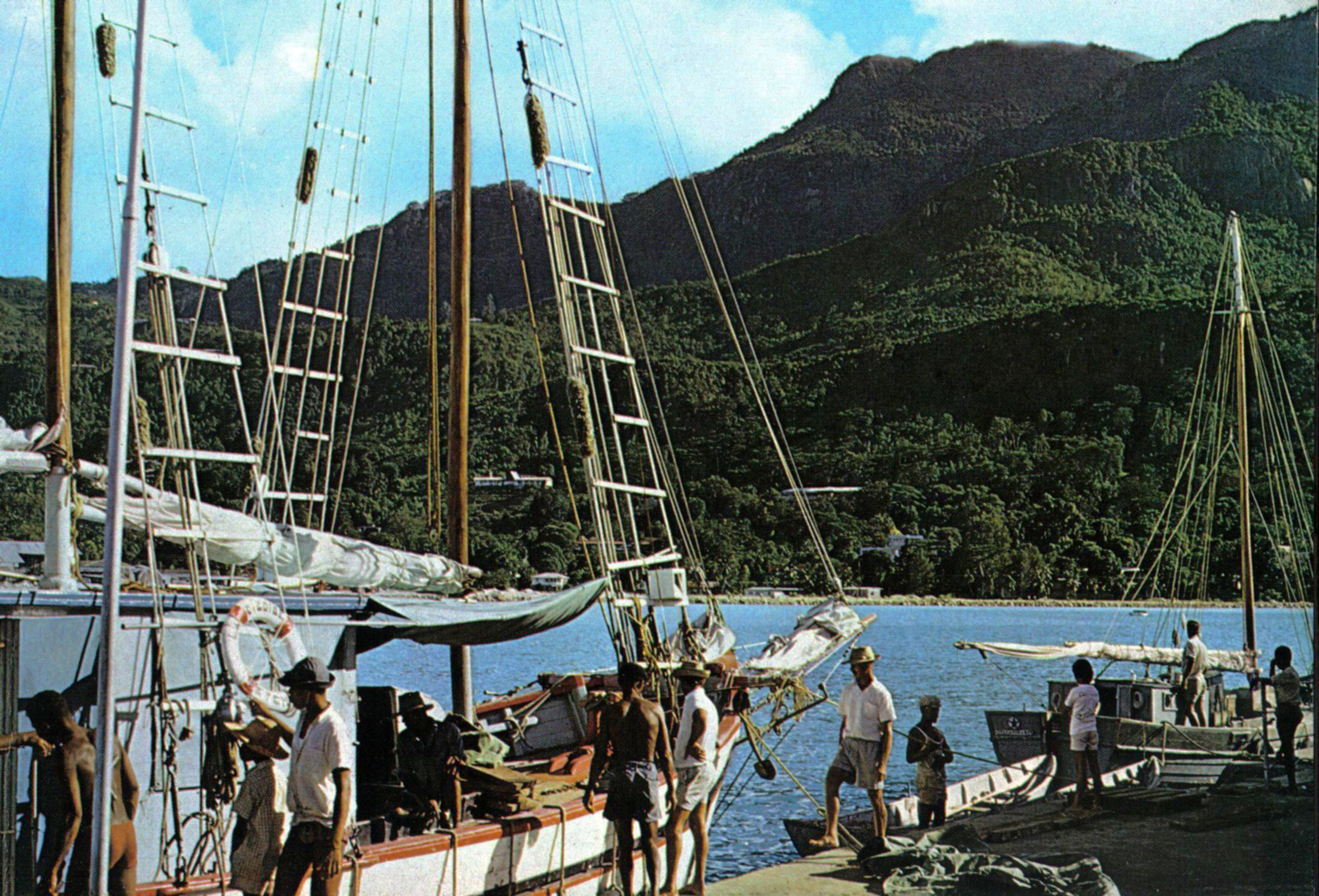
Inter-island schooners in the harbour of Victoria, Seychelles, in the early 1970s

About 100 Seychellois contract workers were returned to Seychelles when Diego Garcia closed in 1971; the Chagossians who settled there included children of Seychellois workers born in the islands and islanders married to Seychellois. According to Jeffery, 232 islanders had been relocated to Seychelles by 1973, against between 1,328 and 1,522 to Mauritius; the Seychelles News Agency puts the number deported to Mahé at more than 200. The High Court found that "There was nothing for Ilois on the Seychelles": the contract workers were paid only the balance of their contracts, and the Seychelles Ilois took no part in the 1982 settlement and received nothing from the Ilois Trust Fund. In 1997 the British High Commission rejected the claims of the Chagos Social Committee (Seychelles), saying that most of those who went to Seychelles had been contract labourers and that the problems the compensation addressed in Mauritius did not exist there.

Chagossians in Seychelles told Human Rights Watch that they had been called foreigners and that their identity cards marked them as born in Chagos; a Seychellois anthropologist said that many hid their accent to avoid discrimination in housing, credit and jobs. Pierre Prosper, chair of the Chagossian Committee Seychelles, has said that those who left the islands as adults "fared badly"; the committee has pressed for compensation, boycotted British-funded heritage visits in 2018 and 2019 and supported Solange Hoareau's challenge to the British decision of 2016 against resettlement. It seeks political autonomy for the islands under Mauritian sovereignty, on what Prosper called a "Rodrigues Plus" model, saying: "We do not want to be diluted amongst other Mauritians." The Seychelles government told the International Court of Justice in 2018 that the Chagossians brought to Seychelles had obtained citizenship and integrated, but that "no compensation has ever been rendered" to them. In March 2026 President Patrick Herminie backed Mauritian sovereignty and welcomed assurances that Seychellois Chagossians would be treated equally in compensation under the 2025 treaty.

=== United Kingdom ===
The South Terminal of Gatwick Airport, 2018. Many Chagossians who moved to Britain arrived at Gatwick and settled in nearby Crawley.

After the British Overseas Territories Act 2002 made British citizens of the islanders and many of their children (see § Nationality and citizenship), many moved on to Britain in search of better education and jobs; an initial group of 19 landed at Gatwick Airport in 2002. The Chagos Islands Community Association told a parliamentary committee in 2008 that its members had spent days sleeping at the airport and then in hostels, and had held a 24-hour demonstration outside the council offices in Crawley in the winter of 2005–06 to obtain council housing and benefits. Most settled in Crawley, where, according to the UK Chagos Support Association, the newcomers "arrived into Gatwick with very little money" and were given "little to no support". According to Chagossian Voices, many found work around the airport; the community association said in 2008 that those in work were mostly in "the lowest-paid jobs". Community organisations in Crawley have included a branch of the Chagos Refugees Group and Chagossian Voices, whose founder runs a weekly lunch club where islanders converse in Chagossian Creole.

Crawley has the largest Chagossian community in Britain (see § Population today); a smaller community lives in Greater Manchester, notably in Wythenshawe. Until 2022 grandchildren of the islanders born outside British territory could not inherit British citizenship, so families were divided between Britain and Mauritius, and according to activists hundreds of relatives lived in Britain without legal status.

Before the 2022 citizenship route for descendants opened, Crawley's council leader warned that the expected arrival of 3,000 to 5,000 people could create "a crisis situation for Crawley", and by October 2023 the council's request for government funding was still unanswered. On 10 June 2024, 52 people arrived from Mauritius at Gatwick, joining 25 earlier arrivals; 40 of the 77 were offered emergency accommodation and the rest were sheltered in a leisure centre. The council, which had declared a housing emergency in February, said that the protests accompanying the arrivals showed that "a deep sense of injustice remains". The London Borough of Hillingdon, which includes Heathrow Airport, said that 171 people from the territory sought its help between July 2024 and February 2025, and a briefing for voluntary organisations in Greater Manchester recorded about 16 households arriving at Manchester Airport in September 2024 and 127 in March 2025. The government expects Chagossian British citizens to arrange accommodation before they travel, and said in 2025 that Hillingdon had received additional funding. Of the £40 million support package for Chagossian communities announced in 2016, £1.6 million had been spent by July 2024; in December 2025 the government said that it was increasing support for Chagossians in the United Kingdom.

== Population today ==
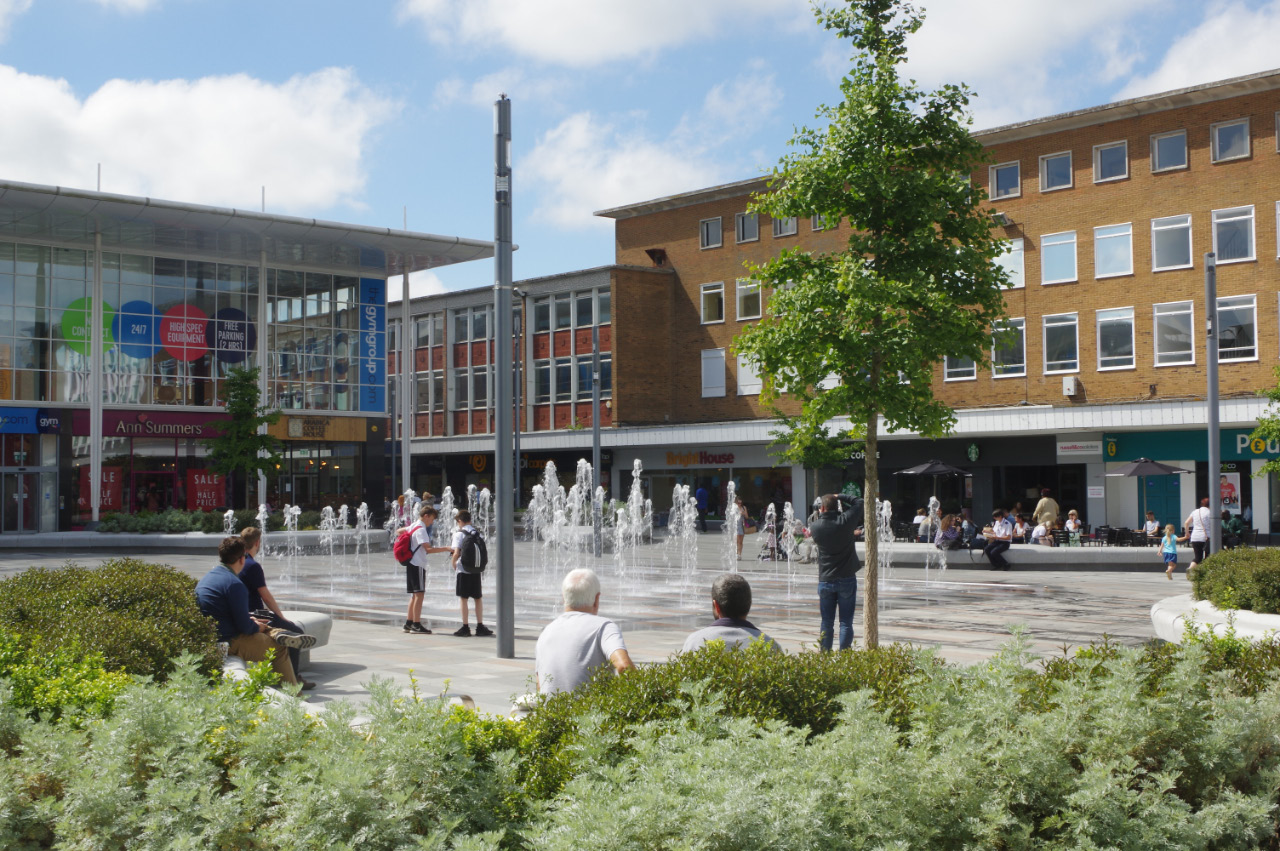
Queens Square, in the centre of Crawley, West Sussex, 2018. In 2022 the British government estimated that some 3,000 of about 10,000 Chagossians lived in the town.

There is no census of Chagossians, and the British Home Office does not record applicants' ancestry or hold an estimate of their numbers. In 2016 the National Security Adviser told the Prime Minister that the global diaspora numbered about 9,000. The same year L'Express estimated about 8,700 Chagossians in Mauritius, 350 in Seychelles and 3,000 in Britain, of whom 483, 75 and 127 respectively had been born in the islands. In 2022 the British government estimated that there were about 10,000 Chagossians in the United Kingdom, Mauritius and Seychelles, a figure repeated in the press in 2024 and 2025. Estimates for the United Kingdom vary: Al Jazeera put the number at about 3,000 in 2021 and in 2024, while Crawley Borough Council estimated 3,500 in the town alone in 2024, two-thirds of the national total, and the group Chagossian Voices put the number in Sussex at about 4,000. Crawley's community had been put at about 3,000 by a community leader in 2016 and by the British government in 2022. According to the council, 6,600 people had applied under the descendants' citizenship route by October 2023, and 3,200 had been approved; in 2025 there were 271 grants under the route on applications made in the United Kingdom.

Counts differ partly because the terms are loosely defined: the High Court observed in 2003 that both "Ilois" and "Chagossians" were used without "a precise or commonly agreed definition". Of the 4,959 claimants in the 2002 group action, only 1,072 had been born in the islands, and by 2025, according to Bancoult, the youngest of those born there were in their fifties. The British citizenship route is open to all direct descendants of people born in the islands, whereas the Mauritian trust fund bill of 2025 recognised as Chagossians only those born there before 31 December 1973 and their children, a definition that the group Chagossian Voices called restrictive and discriminatory. Many Chagossians hold more than one nationality: in April 2025, 94 per cent of Chagossians with British nationality also held Mauritian citizenship.

== Nationality and citizenship ==
Until 1965 the Chagos Archipelago was a dependency of Mauritius, and the islanders were citizens of the United Kingdom and Colonies (CUKCs) by birth. When Mauritius became independent on 12 March 1968, section 20(4) of its constitution treated a person born in the archipelago before the creation of BIOT as born in Mauritius, so that most Chagossians became Mauritian citizens automatically; the exception was those whose fathers had been born in Seychelles.

The British government treated the islanders as Mauritians or Seychellois: from 1966 officials planned to describe them as "Mauritians and Seychellois", to issue them with temporary residence permits and to establish that they were "belongers" of Mauritius or Seychelles, so that the territory would have no permanent population for which the United Kingdom would have to account to the United Nations. In 1974 the British High Commissioner told Chagossian petitioners that he "cannot intervene between yourselves as Mauritians and the Government of Mauritius".

The British Overseas Territories Act 2002 (left) made Chagossians born in the islands, and some of their children, British citizens; the Nationality and Borders Act 2022 (right) opened a free registration route for the direct descendants of Chagossians born in the islands.

Under the British Nationality Act 1981 the first generation became British Dependent Territories citizens in 1983, and they became British citizens under the British Overseas Territories Act 2002. Section 6 of the 2002 Act, in force from 21 May 2002, also made British citizens of those born between 26 April 1969 and 1 January 1983 to a mother who was a CUKC by birth in the territory. As Jeffery noted, the Act excluded third and later generations born outside the archipelago, who were generally Mauritian or Seychellois citizens only. The Nationality and Borders Act 2022 created a free route for the direct descendants of Chagossians born in the islands to register as British Overseas Territories citizens and British citizens; applications opened on 23 November 2022, adults must apply within five years, and those who were children when it opened have until the age of 23.

Mauritius regards the Chagossians as its nationals, describing those removed as "Mauritian nationals". The questions put to the International Court of Justice in 2017 referred to "the inability of Mauritius to implement a programme for the resettlement on the Chagos Archipelago of its nationals, in particular those of Chagossian origin", and the court's 2019 advisory opinion described the resettlement of "Mauritian nationals, including those of Chagossian origin" as a human rights issue for the United Nations General Assembly. Under the 2025 treaty, Mauritius is "free to implement a programme of resettlement on the islands of the Chagos Archipelago other than Diego Garcia". In December 2025 Mauritius confirmed that people born in the archipelago before 31 December 1973, and the children of a parent so born, would be eligible to resettle, and that those in Britain without Mauritian citizenship could acquire it while keeping British citizenship. The same month its Attorney General reaffirmed that the Chagossians are an integral part of the Mauritian people.

Islanders collecting the first compensation payment in 1982 were to bring a birth certificate, and descendants applying under the 2022 British citizenship route must normally supply a series of birth certificates tracing their descent from someone born in the islands. In 2024 seven Chagossians told The Guardian that new Mauritian and Seychellois passports and birth certificates gave their birthplace as Mauritius; the Mauritian government did not comment. After Baroness Foster and Baroness Hoey made similar allegations in the House of Lords in November 2025, the British government said that Mauritius had confirmed that its civil status documents would record the place of birth as the Chagos Archipelago, and would review and amend any that did not.

Some Chagossians reject Mauritian identity: Lefade seeks Chagossian self-determination under the British flag, and members of the self-declared Chagossian Government‑in‑Exile, formed in December 2025, said that they wanted to remain British citizens and subjects of the King. In the 2025 Lords survey some respondents, mostly in Britain, cited their British identity, one writing: "we are English, and we remain Chagos English". The Chagos Refugees Group, by contrast, supports the 2025 treaty because it allows resettlement.

== Campaigns and organisations ==
=== Early activism (1968–1990s) ===
The islanders began to organise soon after their removal. Those who arrived in Port Louis on the Nordvaer in 1973 demonstrated and refused to leave the ship, and were eventually given housing in poor conditions. From 1974 Ilois petitioned the British government for permission to return to Diego Garcia to tend their ancestors' graves, and a committee formed by Christian Ramdass in the early 1970s organised petitions and meetings. A petition of 1975 to the British and American governments, quoted by Vine, declared "that we are the heirs of those islands", adding: "We were living free." In February 1975 Michel Vencatessen, who had been removed from Diego Garcia in 1971, sued the British government in London, in a case that came to be treated as group litigation on behalf of all the islanders.

According to Human Rights Watch, Chagossian women led a series of hunger strikes and demonstrations from 1978 over the delayed and inadequate first compensation, housing and the return to Chagos, which the Mauritian authorities tried to suppress, "including through violence and arrests". Charlesia Alexis and Lisette Talate led a group of women campaigners, and Alexis took part in hunger strikes at Cassis, Terre Rouge and the Jardin de la Compagnie in Port Louis. In 1979 a committee elected at Beau-Bassin, with Alexis as president and Talate among its members, led the campaign against renunciation forms that the islanders were asked to sign in return for a British offer of £1.25 million; it became the Ilois committee of the Creole association Organisation Fraternelle (CIOF). In 1980 the CIOF broke away from a Joint Ilois Committee, which included the Ilois Support Committee of the Mauritian politician Kishore Mundil, to pursue a more militant line of demonstrations and hunger strikes. The committees claimed £8 million in 1981, and Ilois representatives joined the Mauritian delegations in talks that led to the agreement of July 1982, under which the United Kingdom paid a further £4 million (see Expulsion of the Chagossians). The High Court later described the islanders as "extremely determined", and as having been effective in obtaining "compensation which the UK Government had never wished to pay". In Britain the cause was taken up by members of Parliament, the churchman Trevor Huddleston and a support committee.

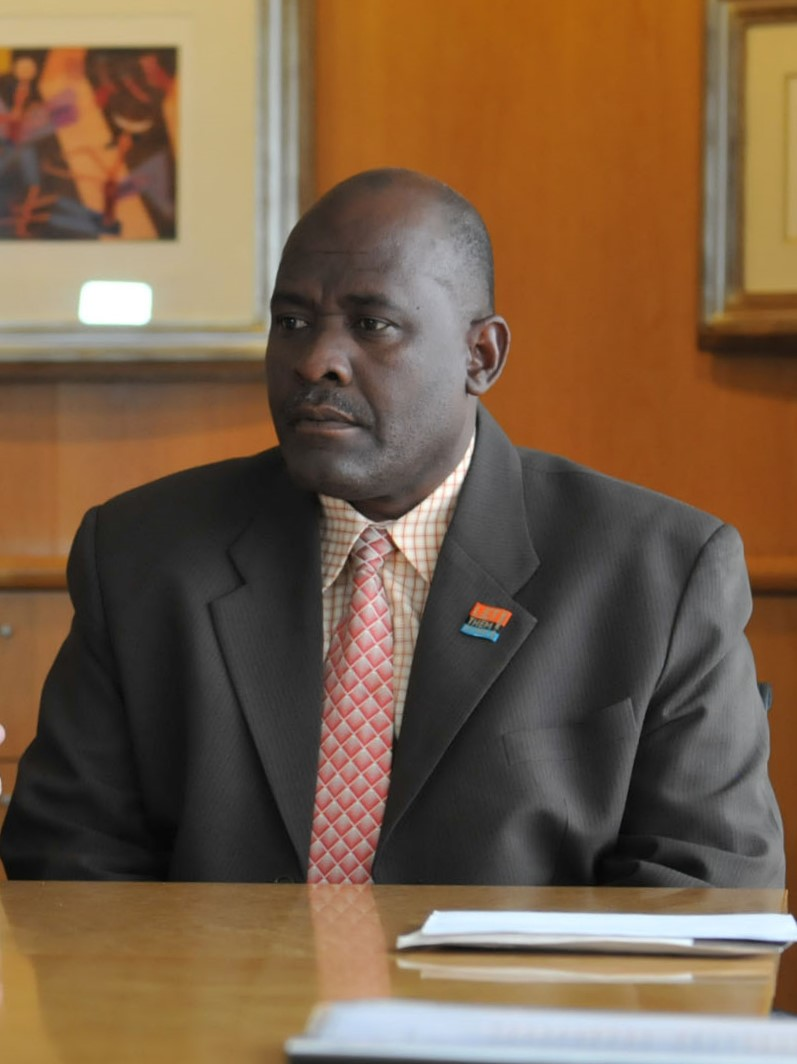
Olivier Bancoult, president of the Chagos Refugees Group, in 2013

Dissatisfaction with the trust fund that distributed the 1982 money led to the founding of the Chagos Refugees Group (CRG) in about 1983, with Alexis as its first president, joined by Talate, Claudette Lefade and Olivier Bancoult. By 1985 the CRG was arguing that the islanders had been exiled through coercion in violation of their human rights; it lost influence to the CIOF in about 1989, the year in which an Ilois demonstration called for a new delegation to seek further compensation. In 1993 Chagossians applied to visit the islands to press their claimed right to return; permission was granted on appeal in 1995, subject to conditions, but the trip never took place. A BIOT Social Committee was formed in 1995. In Seychelles, where the islanders had received nothing under the 1982 agreement, a group petitioned the United Nations, the Queen and the British and American governments for compensation in 1996, and the Chagos Social Committee (Seychelles) was registered in 1997 to establish their rights as British citizens. In 1998 Bancoult, by then chairman of the revived CRG, began a new phase of litigation.

=== Organisations ===
Chagossian organisations are based in Mauritius, Seychelles and the United Kingdom. In 2023 Human Rights Watch named the CRG, Chagos Asylum People, Chagossian Voices and the Seychelles Chagossian Committee as representative groups whose members it had interviewed. In 2025 Bancoult listed three groups in England, the Chagos Islanders Movement, the UK Native Chagossian Council and the CRG's British branch, as supporting the bill to implement the treaty with Mauritius, and said that only Chagos Asylum People, Chagossian Voices and BIOT Citizens opposed it. The UK Chagos Support Association, run by non-Chagossian volunteers, worked with the community for more than twenty years before announcing in 2022 that it would close, to leave the field to Chagossian-led groups.

Chagossian organisations
Organisation	Founded	Base	Leader(s)	Aims and stated positions
Comité Ilois Organisation Fraternelle (CIOF)	1979–1980	Mauritius	Charlesia Alexis (president, 1979); Elie Michel	Refused to renounce the right of return; took part in negotiating, and supported, the 1982 compensation agreement
Chagos Refugees Group (CRG)	c. 1983	Pointe aux Sables, Port Louis; British branch in Crawley	Charlesia Alexis (first president); Olivier Bancoult (chairman since the 1990s); Sabrina Jean (British branch, 2016)	Return and compensation; brought the Bancoult cases; backed Mauritian sovereignty after its British cases failed, and supports the 2025 treaty
Chagos Social Committee (Seychelles)	1997 (registered)	Seychelles	Jeanette Alexis (chair, 2002)	Rights of the Seychelles islanders as British citizens and compensation; represented the Seychelles claimants in the 2002 group action
Chagossian Committee Seychelles	–	Seychelles	Pierre Prosper (chair)	Called for boycotts of British-run heritage visits in 2018 and 2019; sought to make submissions to the International Tribunal for the Law of the Sea in 2021; in 2020 sought political autonomy for Chagossians, with Mauritius as the "parent state"
Chagossian Social Committee	–	Mauritius	Fernand Mandarin (died 2016); Guy Bruno Mandarin (chairman from 2017)	Engaged with the British support package of 2016; its members made a heritage visit paid for by the British High Commission in 2017
UK Chagos Support Association	–	United Kingdom	Non-Chagossian volunteers	Supported the campaigns for return and for citizenship; published a costed resettlement proposal with the CRG in 2008; announced its closure in 2022
Diego Garcia and Chagos Islands Council	2011	Crawley	Allen Vincatassin (president)	Elected as a "provisional administration in waiting"; favours continued British sovereignty and coexistence with the base on Diego Garcia
Chagossian Voices	2020 (according to the group)	United Kingdom	Frankie Bontemps (chair, 2024)	Recognition of Chagossians as an Indigenous people; rejects the 2019 advisory opinion; opposes the 2025 treaty, saying that Chagossians were not consulted
Chagos Asylum People	–	Roche Bois, Port Louis, and London	Claudette Lefade	Self-determination under the British flag; opposes the 2025 treaty
BIOT Citizens	By 2022	United Kingdom	Misley Mandarin (founder)	Continued British sovereignty; has called for a referendum on the 2025 treaty
Chagossian Government‑in‑Exile	16 December 2025	United Kingdom; Île du Coin (from 2026)	Misley Mandarin (interim "first minister")	Return under British sovereignty; described by PA Media in 2026 as "unrecognised"

=== Divisions within the community ===
Human Rights Watch found that the Chagossians it interviewed in 2021–2022 had "different views on key issues affecting them, including which country should govern Chagos", but overwhelmingly supported the right to return. Writing in openDemocracy in 2011, Alex Morrison described the islanders as "deeply divided" between those who wanted British sovereignty to continue and the many who considered the islands part of Mauritius. In 2008 Bancoult told a House of Commons committee that sovereignty was "an issue between two Governments"; according to Al Jazeera, he later opted to back Mauritian sovereignty after reaching "a legal dead end in the UK".

Chagossian Voices said in 2024 that it did not accept the 2019 advisory opinion of the International Court of Justice because Chagossians had not been consulted and "do not primarily identify as Mauritians". BIOT Citizens wrote on Twitter in 2022: "Chagossians are not Mauritian. We are British." In November 2024 members of the BOT Citizen Platform, a group of descendants loyal to Britain, protested at the British High Commission in Port Louis and then went to the CRG's centre at Pointe-aux-Sables, saying that Mauritian nationality had been imposed on them; native-born Chagossians gathered there under Bancoult replied that they were Mauritian. Bancoult has questioned the opponents' standing, saying that most of them were born in Mauritius rather than on the islands. In Seychelles, Pierre Prosper of the Chagossian committee called in 2020 for "political autonomy, while with Mauritius remaining as the parent state", and said in 2023: "We want a clear say on what happens to us." In January 2025 Navarre-Marie, then Minister of Gender Equality and Family Welfare and herself the daughter of Chagossians, said that she was saddened to see the community dividing over the agreement when its priority should be to unite.

Consultation has been a recurring grievance. In 2023 Human Rights Watch observed that there was "no clear declaration" that Chagossians would be meaningfully consulted on the British–Mauritian negotiations. Chagossian Voices withdrew in January 2024 from the British government's engagement meetings, which it called "tokenistic". In 2024 Bancoult said that the Mauritian prime minister had consulted the Chagossians "every time he had a negotiation". In December 2025 a Foreign Office minister told the Commons that Chagossians "do not speak with one voice".

From 2021 to 2025 Mauritian law made it an offence, punishable by a fine of up to five million rupees and imprisonment for up to ten years, for a person acting under the authority or instructions of, under contract with, or with the financial support of a foreign state found by an international court or tribunal to have no valid claim to Mauritian territory, to produce or distribute coins, stamps, official maps or other official objects or documents misrepresenting Mauritius's sovereignty over any part of its territory. The National Assembly repealed the provision on 28 October 2025; according to the British government, concerns had been raised that Chagossians might face prosecution for expressing their affiliation with the United Kingdom, although no one had been prosecuted under it.

== Litigation ==
The Royal Courts of Justice in London (left), home of the High Court and the Court of Appeal, and Middlesex Guildhall (right), seat of the Supreme Court of the United Kingdom

Chagossians have brought cases in the courts of England and Wales, the United States, the European Court of Human Rights and the British Indian Ocean Territory since 1975. Vencatessen, brought in one man's name, came to be treated as a test case for all the islanders and was withdrawn in 1982 as a condition of the compensation settlement. From 1998 Olivier Bancoult, as chairman of the CRG, brought the series of judicial reviews known as the Bancoult cases, and in 2002 the CRG and the Chagos Social Committee (Seychelles) represented about 5,000 claimants in a group action for compensation. The islanders' exclusion was quashed in 2000 and 2006, but the House of Lords upheld the 2004 orders in 2008, and later challenges to the marine protected area, to the 2016 decision against resettlement and to the 2025 treaty failed. Refusing permission to appeal in the group action in 2004, Lord Justice Sedley wrote that it might not be too late to make return possible, but that "such an outcome is a function of economic resources and political will, not of adjudication". Chagossians have also turned to international bodies: the Chagossian Committee Seychelles sought to file submissions as amicus curiae in the Mauritius–Maldives maritime boundary case in 2021, which the tribunal declined, and in 2025 Bertrice Pompe and Bernadette Dugasse complained to the UN Human Rights Committee about the 2025 treaty.

Cases brought by Chagossians
Case	Court(s)	Years	Outcome
Vencatessen v Attorney General	High Court	1975–1982	Damages claim by a Chagossian over his removal from Diego Garcia; stayed by agreement in October 1982 after the 1982 agreement on compensation
Bancoult (No 1)	High Court (Divisional Court)	1998–2000	Section 4 of the 1971 Immigration Ordinance, which excluded the islanders, quashed; the government did not appeal
Chagos Islanders v Attorney General	High Court; Court of Appeal	2002–2004	Group claim for compensation and a right of return struck out; permission to appeal refused
Bancoult v. McNamara	US District Court, D.C.; Court of Appeals, D.C. Circuit; US Supreme Court	2001–2007	Claims against the United States and former officials dismissed as raising non-justiciable political questions; certiorari denied
Bancoult (No 2)	Divisional Court; Court of Appeal; House of Lords	2004–2008	Section 9 of the 2004 Constitution Order quashed (2006) and the government's appeal dismissed (2007); the House of Lords allowed the government's further appeal by three to two, upholding the 2004 orders
Chagos Islanders v United Kingdom	European Court of Human Rights	2004–2012	Application by 1,786 Chagossians declared inadmissible
Bancoult (No 3)	Divisional Court; Court of Appeal; Supreme Court	2010–2018	Challenge to the marine protected area dismissed; final appeal dismissed by five to two
R (Horeau) v Secretary of State for Foreign and Commonwealth Affairs	High Court	2016	Permission to challenge the 2015 consultation on resettlement refused
Bancoult (No 2) (application to set aside)	Supreme Court	2015–2016	Application to set aside the 2008 decision, on the ground of undisclosed documents about the 2002 feasibility study, refused by three to two
Hoareau and Bancoult	Divisional Court; Court of Appeal	2017–2020	Challenge to the 2016 decision against resettlement dismissed
Pompe and Mandarin	High Court	2025–2026	Out-of-hours injunction delaying the signature of the 2025 treaty granted and discharged on 22 May 2025; permission to challenge the failure to consult Chagossians refused on 10 March 2026
Mandarin v Commissioner	Supreme Court of the BIOT; BIOT Court of Appeal	2026	Injunction against the removal of four Chagossians from Île du Coin; section 9 of the 2004 Constitution Order and the removal notices quashed, with the effect stayed pending appeal; appeal heard in July 2026

== Right of return and resettlement ==
=== Feasibility studies and the 2004 orders ===
After Bancoult (No 1) in November 2000 the Foreign Secretary, Robin Cook, accepted the ruling, and the BIOT Commissioner made a new immigration ordinance that allowed the islanders to return to the outer islands, though not to Diego Garcia. No one went to live there, and the islanders awaited the outcome of a feasibility study on resettlement begun in 1999. The study, produced in 2002, found that short-term resettlement might be feasible but that in the long term the need for sea defences would make the cost of living on the low-lying atolls prohibitive. A House of Commons Library briefing later noted that it "was viewed by many as seriously flawed". On 10 June 2004 the government made the British Indian Ocean Territory (Constitution) Order 2004, whose section 9 declares that "no person has the right of abode in the Territory", and an Immigration Order requiring a permit to enter or be present; the Chagossians were not consulted. Announcing the orders, the minister Bill Rammell said that it would be "impossible for the Government to promote or even permit resettlement to take place". The House of Lords upheld them in Bancoult (No 2), where Lord Hoffmann observed that no one had gone to live on the islands while it was lawful to do so and called the right of abode "purely symbolic".

=== KPMG review and the 2016 decision ===
In December 2012 the government announced a review of resettlement policy, for which KPMG carried out a feasibility study between April 2014 and January 2015; it was published in February 2015. The study assessed three options, from a pilot settlement of 150 people to one of 1,500, each relying on infrastructure on Diego Garcia, and found no fundamental legal obstacles; its indicative capital costs ranged from £32.4 million for a reduced pilot to £423.3 million for the largest option. KPMG reported that those attending its consultations "expressed a preference for returning to BIOT permanently", and in a government consultation in 2015, 98 per cent of 895 Chagossian respondents supported resettlement.

On 16 November 2016 the government announced that it had "decided against resettlement of the Chagossian people to the British Indian Ocean Territory on the grounds of feasibility, defence and security interests, and cost to the British taxpayer". It acknowledged that the islanders' removal and treatment had been "wrong", and instead offered a package of about £40 million over ten years to improve Chagossians' lives where they lived, which was also to fund "a significantly expanded programme of visits". Bancoult said that this amounted to "putting the KPMG report in the bin". The CRG rejected the package, and some Chagossians saw it as an attempt to persuade them to abandon resettlement. Little was spent at first: the Foreign Office said in November 2020 that it had spent £570,000, and The Observer reported in January 2021 that less than £12,000 had reached Chagossians in the United Kingdom as direct support, with several hundred thousand pounds used for heritage trips. In 2023 the minister Lord Goldsmith wrote that "Disbursing these funds has been challenging". The decision was challenged without success in Hoareau and Bancoult.

=== Heritage visits ===
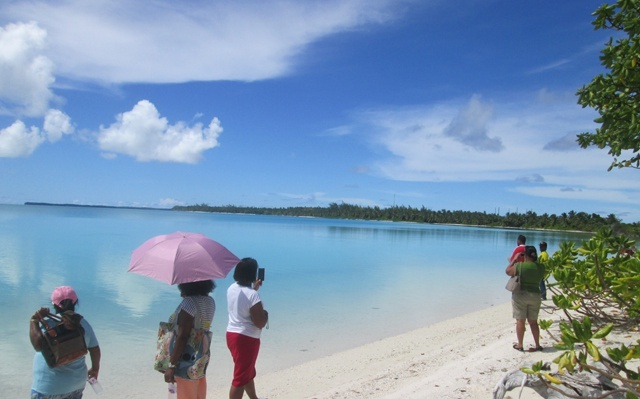
Chagossians from Seychelles on a visit to the territory sponsored by the British government, 2015

Some Chagossians had already visited the outer islands by permit to tend family graves, on trips funded by the territory's administration. In April 2006 almost 100 Chagossians, for whom it was a first visit in forty years, travelled to the islands on a trip arranged by the British and Mauritian governments; they tended family graves, attended mass and unveiled memorials, including a stone on Diego Garcia. Further visits followed in 2008, 2009, 2010, 2011, 2013, 2015, 2017, 2018 and 2019. In October 2017 a visit by seven members of the Chagossian Social Committee was arranged at the expense of the British High Commission in Port Louis. A group in Seychelles boycotted the visits, objecting to their being paid for from the support fund, and the CRG remained opposed to the government's programme. By February 2021 eight heritage visits involving 154 people had been funded, and the programme had been suspended because of the COVID-19 pandemic. Bancoult said that on a visit to Diego Garcia he had found relatives' graves neglected, while a cemetery for US military dogs was well kept.

In February 2022 a boat chartered by the Mauritian government, the Bleu de Nimes, took Chagossians to the archipelago during a Mauritian survey of Blenheim Reef for its maritime boundary case against the Maldives; five of them, including Bancoult and Liseby Elysé, landed on Peros Banhos, the first Chagossians to visit without a British escort or British authorisation. On 14 February Mauritian officials raised the Mauritian flag there; the Foreign Office said that the United Kingdom did not recognise Mauritius's claim, but would not interfere with the survey. A member of BIOT Citizens called the voyage "a huge political stunt", saying that Mauritius had not consulted the Chagossian community as a whole. The British-run visits stopped in 2020 and had not resumed by March 2026, although the Foreign Office had said that they would in 2025; the Chief Justice of the territory observed that Chagossians were "treated worse than tourists and yachtsmen". In February 2026 the Foreign Office said that it was working with Mauritius to resume them.

=== The 2025 agreement ===
Article 6 of the treaty signed by the United Kingdom and Mauritius on 22 May 2025 provides that Mauritius "is free to implement a programme of resettlement on the islands of the Chagos Archipelago other than Diego Garcia"; a House of Lords committee called the article "in substance declaratory", adding: "It does not secure the right to return of the Chagossian community." The United Kingdom is to pay £40 million into a trust fund for Chagossians, to be established by Mauritius. In December 2025 a British minister told the Commons that, under a Mauritian bill, seven of the fund's twelve board members would be Chagossians, among them a representative of those in the United Kingdom, and its chair would be a Chagossian; eligibility to resettle would extend to Chagossians born in the archipelago before 31 December 1973 and their children, and those in the United Kingdom who met the criteria would be eligible for Mauritian citizenship. Chagossian Voices objected to what it saw as the exclusive recognition of the CRG as the representative of Chagossians in Mauritius in the fund's governance. The treaty had not entered into force by November 2026.

The CRG supported the agreement because it allowed resettlement; Bancoult asked: "How could I oppose that even if it is not 100 percent satisfactory?" Frankie Bontemps of Chagossian Voices said: "People are discussing the future of our homeland without us", adding: "We feel voiceless, powerless". Misley Mandarin of BIOT Citizens said that a referendum was necessary. In December 2025 the Committee on the Elimination of Racial Discrimination objected that it "explicitly prevents the return of the Chagossian people to their ancestral lands in Diego Garcia Island". Allan Ngari of Human Rights Watch wrote that the treaty contained no recognition of the Chagossians "as the Indigenous people of the islands", no reference to the right of return and no guarantee of their participation in future governance. Claims by Bertrice Pompe and by Mandarin and his father that the government had failed to consult Chagossians were refused permission in March 2026, the High Court holding that "the Chagossians have never had any right of abode or settlement on the Islands since their ancestors were first brought there".

=== Landing on Île du Coin (2026) ===
Location of Île du Coin in Peros Banhos. Misley Mandarin and three other Chagossians landed on the island on 16 February 2026.

On 16 February 2026 Mandarin and three other Chagossians landed without permits on Île du Coin, in Peros Banhos, intending to establish a permanent settlement in protest against the transfer of the islands to Mauritius. His title of interim "first minister" of the Chagossian Government‑in‑Exile had been conferred in December 2025 by a poll organised by the Great British PAC; PA Media later described the body as "the unrecognised Chagossian government". The Foreign Office called the landing an "illegal, unsafe stunt". After the territory's Chief Justice granted an injunction against their removal, the BIOT Supreme Court on 31 March 2026 quashed section 9 of the 2004 Constitution Order and the removal notices, but held that the four were on the island illegally and that "Nothing in this decision creates a right for the Claimants to set up a permanent camp on the Ile du Coin without the necessary permits." Its decision was stayed pending an appeal heard in July 2026. Six Chagossians were living on the island in September 2026.

== Official attitudes and records ==
=== Officials' descriptions, 1965–1971 ===
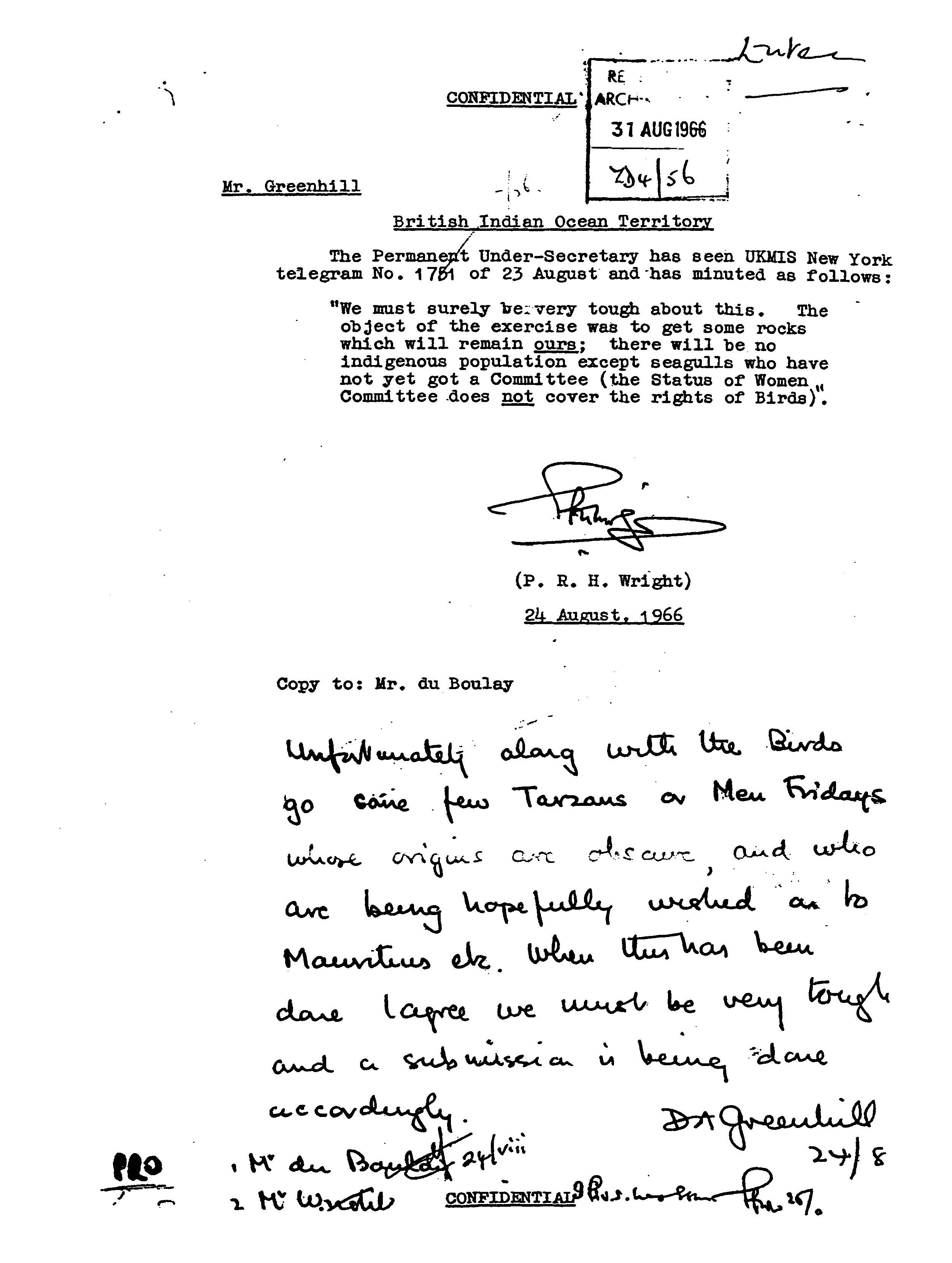
Foreign Office note of 24 August 1966 quoting the Permanent Under-Secretary's minute ("no indigenous population except seagulls"), with D. A. Greenhill's handwritten comment below it

A note of 24 August 1966 quoted a minute by the Permanent Under-Secretary at the Foreign Office, whom Vine identifies as Sir Paul Gore-Booth, saying that "there will be no indigenous population except seagulls". Below it another official, D. A. Greenhill, wrote by hand: "Unfortunately along with the Birds go some few Tarzans or Men Fridays whose origins are obscure, and who are being hopefully wished on to Mauritius etc." Lord Justice Laws, quoting the exchange in 2000, said that Greenhill "spoke the same language". Human Rights Watch later cited the comment as illustrating the "systematic racism and ethnic and racial discrimination" that, in its view, underlay British rule in the archipelago.

At a meeting in August 1968 officials concerned with the United Nations stressed the need to maintain the stance that the population was "merely a bunch of migrant labourers". A US State Department memorandum of June 1969 described the only inhabitants of Diego Garcia as "non-indigenous copra workers imported from Mauritius and the Seychelles", adding that "the British are obligated at our request to remove these workers". In March 1971 the Governor of Seychelles, who was also Commissioner for the British Indian Ocean Territory (BIOT), wrote that the Ilois were "extremely unsophisticated, illiterate, untrainable and unsuitable for any work other than the simplest labour tasks on a copra plantation". Giving evidence in a case decided in 2013, a later Commissioner, Colin Roberts, said that "Man Fridays" was "a quote from a colonial official from the 1960s" that the Foreign Office regarded as "highly regrettable in every sense and offensive to the Chagossians".

=== The 2009 embassy cable and the marine protected area ===
On 1 April 2010 the United Kingdom declared a "no-take" marine protected area around the archipelago, excluding Diego Garcia, in which commercial fishing was to end. Olivier Bancoult challenged the decision in the English courts. His case relied in part on a US embassy cable of 15 May 2009, published by The Guardian in December 2010 and by The Daily Telegraph in February 2011 from material obtained by WikiLeaks. It recorded Roberts as saying that there would be no "'human footprints' or 'Man Fridays'" on the uninhabited islands, and that "establishing a marine park would, in effect, put paid to resettlement claims of the archipelago's former residents". In evidence Roberts denied the "Man Fridays" remark, but accepted that he had told the American officials that the protected area would in effect put paid to resettlement claims, describing this as "a recognition of a reality". The claim failed: in 2018 the Supreme Court held that the cable was admissible in evidence, but decided by five to two that it would not have altered the finding that the Foreign Secretary had no improper motive. Separately, an arbitral tribunal in a case brought by Mauritius found in 2015 that the United Kingdom had breached the United Nations Convention on the Law of the Sea in declaring the area.

=== 2012 petition to the White House ===
On 5 March 2012 SPEAK, a human rights group based in Port Louis, launched a petition on the We the People website of the White House, asking the United States to provide the Chagossians with "resettlement to the outer Chagos islands, employment, and compensation". It passed the threshold of 25,000 signatures needed for an official response on 3 April 2012 and eventually gathered 30,037. The reply, signed by three assistant secretaries of state, Michael Posner, Philip Gordon and Andrew Shapiro, stated that "The U.S. recognizes the British Indian Ocean Territories, including the Chagos Archipelago, as the sovereign territory of the United Kingdom". It pointed to the steps the United Kingdom had taken to compensate the former inhabitants, "including cash payments and eligibility for British citizenship".

== Human rights assessments ==
=== United Nations bodies ===
The United Nations Human Rights Committee recommended in 2001 that the United Kingdom "seek to make exercise of the Ilois' right to return to their territory practicable", and in 2008 that it "ensure that the Chagos islanders can exercise their right to return to their territory". The Committee on the Elimination of Racial Discrimination (CERD) regretted in 2016 that the United Kingdom maintained that the Convention did not apply to the territory "on the grounds that it has no permanent population". In 2016 and again in 2024 it urged the United Kingdom to consult the Chagossians "to facilitate their return to their islands and to provide them with an effective remedy, including compensation".

In February 2023 five holders of United Nations special procedures mandates wrote to the British government, and separately to Mauritius, expressing "grave concerns regarding the continued forced displacement of the Chagossian people" and about the lack of Chagossian participation in the negotiations over the archipelago. In October 2024 a group of UN experts said that "all Chagossians have the right to return to live in the Chagos Islands, including Diego Garcia". In June 2025 several of them said that the treaty signed with Mauritius "appears to be at variance with the Chagossians' right to return" and called "for the ratification of the agreement to be suspended". The British government responded that the experts' views were "not binding". In December 2025 CERD, acting under its early-warning procedure, called on Mauritius and the United Kingdom "to suspend the ratification of the bilateral agreement" and to obtain the Chagossians' "free, prior and informed consent". According to a statement issued on their behalf, the procedure had been triggered on 26 May 2025, four days after the treaty was signed, by two Chagossian women born on Diego Garcia who opposed the treaty, Bertrice Pompe and Bernadette Dugasse. Mauritius told the committee in December 2025 that it deplored the decision, which it said caused "serious prejudice to the Republic of Mauritius as a sovereign state", and a British minister told the House of Lords in January 2026 that "The UK does not agree with the approach that the CERD has taken". In its 2019 advisory opinion the International Court of Justice said that the resettlement of Mauritian nationals, "including those of Chagossian origin, is an issue relating to the protection of the human rights of those concerned", to be addressed by the General Assembly during the completion of decolonisation.

=== Human Rights Watch report ===
In February 2023 Human Rights Watch (HRW) published a report based on interviews with 43 Chagossians in the United Kingdom, Mauritius and Seychelles. It concluded that "the continuing forced displacement of the Chagossians, the prevention of their permanent return to their homeland, and their persecution on racial and ethnic grounds amount to crimes against humanity", and that "The first crime, at least, was jointly committed by UK and US authorities". It called for reparations, including the lifting of the ban on permanent return, compensation for all Chagossians, and apologies from both governments. The Foreign Office replied: "we categorically reject this characterisation of events", while repeating its "deep regret about the manner in which Chagossians were removed". In December 2019 the prime minister of Mauritius, Pravind Jugnauth, had told the BBC that he was exploring the possibility of bringing charges of crimes against humanity against individual British officials at the International Criminal Court.

=== Acknowledgements and calls for apology ===
The British government has expressed regret on several occasions: in 2016 it said that the manner of the removal "was wrong and we look back with deep regret", and before the International Court of Justice in 2018 it stated that it "fully accepts that the manner in which the Chagossians were removed from the Chagos Archipelago, and the way they were treated thereafter, was shameful and wrong, and it deeply regrets that fact". The preamble of the 2025 treaty records that "past treatment of Chagossians has left a deeply regrettable legacy". Mauritius called the British expressions of regret "belated and inadequate". Human Rights Watch recommended that King Charles III "issue a full and unreserved apology to the Chagossian people", which it said Chagossians had called for. In its 2025 decision CERD expressed concern that the treaty did not guarantee "the issuing of a formal apology or recognition of the harm inflicted on them".

== Indigenous status ==
Whether the Chagossians are an indigenous people is disputed, and legal understandings of indigenous status are, in the words of the political scientist Alice Engelhard, "open to interpretation". The definition first used by the United Nations Working Group on Indigenous Populations required "historical continuity with pre-invasion and pre-colonial societies", which the Chagossians cannot show because the archipelago was uninhabited before European colonisation in the late 18th century. According to Jeffery, later United Nations practice has instead looked to priority in the occupation of a territory, cultural distinctiveness, self-identification and recognition by others, and an experience of subjugation or discrimination.

Several judges and organisations have applied the term to the Chagossians: in 2000 Lord Justice Laws described the Ilois as "an indigenous people: they were born there, as were one or both of their parents, in many cases one or more of their grandparents". In 2008 Lord Bingham, dissenting in the House of Lords, said that the House had been referred to no instance in which the royal prerogative "had been exercised to exile an indigenous population from its homeland". Judge Giorgio Gaja of the International Court of Justice noted in 2019 that "no programme for the resettlement in the Archipelago of the indigenous population has been implemented". Minority Rights Group International told a parliamentary inquiry in 2007 that "the Chagossians do indeed constitute an indigenous people". Human Rights Watch argued in 2023 that the Chagossians meet the criteria for an indigenous people set out by the African Commission on Human and Peoples' Rights, and urged the British and Mauritian governments to recognise them as such. Chagossian organisations have adopted the claim: Fernand Mandarin of the Chagossian Social Committee attended the UN Working Group on Indigenous Populations in 1997, the Pretoria/Tshwane Declaration, agreed with Chagossian groups at a conference in 2022, described the Chagossians as "an Indigenous People of the Chagos Islands", and in 2023 the British-based Chagossian Voices took part in meetings of the United Nations Permanent Forum on Indigenous Issues and the Expert Mechanism on the Rights of Indigenous Peoples.

United Nations human rights mechanisms have used varying terms: a letter sent to the British government in February 2023 by five special procedures mandate-holders relayed "information received" that "Chagossians are an Indigenous people, predominantly of African descent, and an ethnic and linguistic minority in the United Kingdom and Mauritius", while stating that it did so "Without prejudging the allegations raised". A statement of October 2024, whose signatories included the special rapporteur on the rights of Indigenous Peoples, said that the rights of the Chagossian people, "as well as the rights of Indigenous Peoples, should be at the centre of the negotiations". CERD described the Chagossians in 2025 as "an ethnic group of African and South Asian descent with a distinct cultural identity".

According to Jeffery, successive British and Mauritian governments have argued that the Chagossians are not an indigenous people because the islands' population arose from colonial settlement and so has no continuity with a pre-colonial society. In 2016 a Foreign Office minister, Alan Duncan, told the House of Commons: "we do not consider that the right of self-determination actually applies to the Chagossians". In November 2025, when the House of Lords debated an amendment that would have recognised the Chagossians in British law as the indigenous people of the archipelago, the minister, Baroness Chapman of Darlington, said that the English courts and the European Court of Human Rights had dismissed the claims to the rights it sought to secure, and that the government did not intend to change "that legal position". Mauritius regards the Chagossians as Mauritian citizens. At a UN meeting in July 2023 a Mauritian representative stated that "there has never been an indigenous population on the entire Mauritian territory, which includes the Chagos Archipelago". According to Engelhard, the legal scholar Stephen Allen records that Mauritius regards the Chagossians as a Mauritian national minority rather than an indigenous people.

Scholars are divided: as summarised by Engelhard, Allen argues that the Chagossians qualify as an indigenous people on grounds such as self-identification, attachment to place, dislocation and cultural distinctiveness, while noting that they do not meet definitions based on pre-colonial settlement. Jeffery argues that both governments rely on "an outdated and restricted definition of indigeneity", but concludes that recognition achieves little in practice "when power balances remain unaddressed". Engelhard writes that the Chagossian claim "stretches the concept of 'indigeneity'" away from origin in a place, and that claiming a discrete indigenous identity "may have the effect of fixing and bounding a Chagossian identity" that was itself sharpened by the experience of displacement.

== Notable Chagossians ==
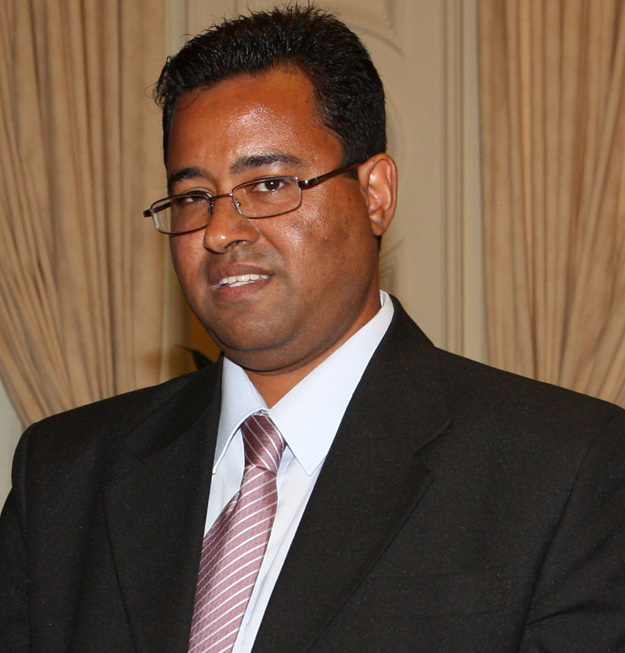
Allen Vincatassin in 2011

The following people of Chagossian birth or descent are noted in reliable sources for their part in the community's public life:

Name	Born	Known for
Charlesia Alexis	1934 (died 2012)	Singer and campaigner, born on Diego Garcia; first president of the Chagos Refugees Group
Lisette Talate	(died 2012)	Campaigner who with Alexis led protests by Chagossian women in Mauritius; joined Alexis in the Chagos Refugees Group
Rita Bancoult		Former resident of Peros Banhos whose story opens David Vine's Island of Shame; mother of Olivier Bancoult
Fernand Mandarin	(died 2016)	Leader of the Chagossian Social Committee; attended the UN Working Group on Indigenous Populations in 1997
Clément Siatous	1947	Painter of scenes of island life before the expulsion
Liseby Elysé	1953	Born on Peros Banhos; her recorded statement was played at the International Court of Justice's advisory hearings in 2018; appointed a Member of the Order of the Star and Key of the Indian Ocean in 2019
Arianne Navarre-Marie		Born to Chagossian parents; Minister of Gender Equality and Family Welfare from November 2024 and, from May 2026, Deputy Prime Minister of Mauritius, the first woman in the office
Olivier Bancoult	1964	Born on Peros Banhos; founder and chairperson of the Chagos Refugees Group and claimant in the Bancoult cases
Sabrina Jean	c. 1973	Chair of the British branch of the Chagos Refugees Group; appears in the documentary Another Paradise
Allen Vincatassin		President of the Diego Garcia and Chagos Islands Council, which favours continued British administration
Misley Mandarin	c. 1979	Activist opposed to the transfer of the islands to Mauritius; led the landing on Île du Coin in February 2026
Audrey Albert		Manchester-based photographer of Chagossian descent whose work addresses Chagossian identity

== In culture and media ==
=== Film and television ===
David Constantin's Mauritian documentary Diego l'interdite, in Chagossian and Mauritian Creole, tells how the Chagossians were removed from their islands and describes their life in poverty in Mauritius; the novelist Shenaz Patel took part in making it. Stealing a Nation, a documentary by John Pilger made by Granada for ITV and first broadcast on 6 October 2004, includes interviews with exiled islanders. It won the Royal Television Society's award for a single documentary. Another Paradise, by the Belgian director Olivier Magis, follows the Chagossian community in Crawley and features Sabrina Jean; it premiered at the Sheffield documentary festival in June 2019.

=== Literature ===
Patel's novel Le Silence des Chagos (2005), inspired by the deportation of the Chagossians, received the Prix Soroptimist de la Romancière francophone in 2006. It was translated into English by Jeffrey Zuckerman as Silence of the Chagos (2019). Vine's Island of Shame (2009), a history of the base, opens with the story of Rita Bancoult. Philippe Sands, a lawyer for Mauritius, wrote The Last Colony around the story of Liseby Elysé and the advisory proceedings; a reading of its French translation, La Dernière Colonie, was given at the Festival d'Avignon in 2022. Diego Garcia (2022), a novel by Natasha Soobramanien and Luke Williams in which two writers seek to write in solidarity with the Chagossians, won the Goldsmiths Prize.

=== Theatre and visual art ===
In 2012 Cardboard Citizens staged Adrian Jackson's play A Few Man Fridays in London, interweaving testimonies of former islanders with a fictional story of a man brought from Diego Garcia to London as a baby. In 2019 the Seychellois theatre group MODESTI, with the Seychelles National Arts Council, mounted an exhibition in Victoria of photographs and of objects that Chagossian families had brought with them to Seychelles, and performed a piece about the islanders. Clément Siatous, born in the archipelago in 1947, paints scenes of life on the islands from memory; a solo exhibition of his work, Sagren, was shown at the Simon Preston Gallery in New York in 2015. The photographer Audrey Albert's exhibition Matter Out of Place, on the forced displacement of the Chagossians, was shown in Manchester, Arles and China, and her first solo exhibition in Britain, Belongers, was commissioned through the Imperial War Museums' 14-18 NOW Legacy Fund and shown at Ffotogallery in 2025.

== See also ==
- Chagos Archipelago sovereignty dispute
- Chagos Islands national football team
- Chagos Refugees Group
- Chagossian Creole
- Chagossian Government‑in‑Exile
- Expulsion of the Chagossians
- History of the Chagos Archipelago
- Right of return
- Sega tambour Chagos

== Sources ==
=== Court and tribunal decisions ===
- R v Secretary of State for the Foreign and Commonwealth Office, ex parte Bancoult, EWHC (Admin) 413 (High Court (Divisional Court) 3 November 2000).
- R (Bancoult) v Secretary of State for Foreign and Commonwealth Affairs, EWCA Civ 498 (Court of Appeal 23 May 2007).
- R (Bancoult) v Secretary of State for Foreign and Commonwealth Affairs, EWHC (Admin) 1038 (High Court (Divisional Court) 11 May 2006).
- R (Bancoult) v Secretary of State for Foreign and Commonwealth Affairs (No 2), UKHL 61 (House of Lords 22 October 2008).
- R (Bancoult) v Secretary of State for Foreign and Commonwealth Affairs, EWCA Civ 708 (Court of Appeal 23 May 2014).
- R (Bancoult) v Secretary of State for Foreign and Commonwealth Affairs, EWHC (Admin) 1502 (High Court (Divisional Court) 11 June 2013).
- R (Bancoult No 3) v Secretary of State for Foreign and Commonwealth Affairs, UKSC 3 (Supreme Court 8 February 2018).
- R (Bancoult No 2) v Secretary of State for Foreign and Commonwealth Affairs, UKSC 35 (Supreme Court 29 June 2016).
- Bancoult v. McNamara, 445 F.3d 427 (D.C. Cir. 21 April 2006).
- "Cause list, 15–17 July 2026: HM Commissioner for the British Indian Ocean Territory v The King (on the application of Mandarin & Ors), [2026] BIOT CA (Civ) 1" (PDF). British Indian Ocean Territory Court of Appeal. 2026.
- Chagos Islanders v Attorney General and HM BIOT Commissioner, EWCA Civ 997 (Court of Appeal 22 July 2004).
- Chagos Islanders v Attorney General and HM BIOT Commissioner, EWHC (QB) 2222 (High Court 9 October 2003).
- Chagos Islanders v United Kingdom, Application no. 35622/04 (European Court of Human Rights 11 December 2012).
- Gaja, Giorgio (25 February 2019). "Separate opinion of Judge Gaja" (PDF). Legal Consequences of the Separation of the Chagos Archipelago from Mauritius in 1965, Advisory Opinion. I.C.J. Reports 2019. International Court of Justice. p. 267.
- R (Hoareau and Bancoult) v Secretary of State for Foreign and Commonwealth Affairs, EWCA Civ 1010 (Court of Appeal 30 July 2020).
- R (Hoareau and Bancoult) v Secretary of State for Foreign and Commonwealth Affairs, EWHC (Admin) 221 (High Court (Divisional Court) 8 February 2019).
- R (Horeau and others) v Secretary of State for Foreign and Commonwealth Affairs, EWHC (Admin) 2102 (High Court 12 August 2016).
- Legal Consequences of the Separation of the Chagos Archipelago from Mauritius in 1965, Advisory Opinion (PDF). I.C.J. Reports 2019. International Court of Justice. 25 February 2019. p. 95.
- International Court of Justice (3 September 2018). Public sitting held on Monday 3 September 2018 (CR 2018/20) (Report). International Court of Justice.
- Dispute concerning delimitation of the maritime boundary between Mauritius and Maldives in the Indian Ocean (Mauritius/Maldives), Judgment (PDF). International Tribunal for the Law of the Sea. 28 April 2023.
- R (Mandarin and others) v HM Commissioner for the British Indian Ocean Territory: Order (Supreme Court of the British Indian Ocean Territory 31 March 2026), Text.
- R (Mandarin and others) v HM Commissioner for the British Indian Ocean Territory (Supreme Court of the British Indian Ocean Territory 31 March 2026), Text.
- Memorial of the Republic of Mauritius. Vol. I. Permanent Court of Arbitration. 1 August 2012.
- Written Comments of the Republic of Mauritius (PDF). Vol. I. International Court of Justice. 15 May 2018.
- Written Statement of the Republic of Mauritius (PDF). Vol. I. International Court of Justice. 1 March 2018.
- In the Matter of the Chagos Marine Protected Area Arbitration (Mauritius v. United Kingdom): Award (PDF). Permanent Court of Arbitration. 18 March 2015.
- R (Pompe) v Secretary of State for Foreign, Commonwealth and Development Affairs; R (Mandarin) v Secretary of State for Foreign, Commonwealth and Development Affairs, EWHC (Admin) 529 (High Court 10 March 2026).
- Robinson, Patrick (25 February 2019). "Separate opinion of Judge Robinson" (PDF). Legal Consequences of the Separation of the Chagos Archipelago from Mauritius in 1965, Advisory Opinion. I.C.J. Reports 2019. International Court of Justice. p. 294.
- Written Statement of the Republic of Seychelles (PDF). International Court of Justice. 28 February 2018.
- "Docket No. 06-502: Bancoult v. McNamara". Supreme Court of the United States. 16 January 2007. Certiorari denied, 549 U.S. 1166 (2007).
- Counter-Memorial of the United Kingdom. Permanent Court of Arbitration. 15 July 2013.
- Written Statement of the United Kingdom (PDF). International Court of Justice. 15 February 2018.

=== United Nations documents ===
- Committee on the Elimination of Racial Discrimination (4 June 2025). Concluding observations on the combined twenty-fourth and twenty-fifth periodic reports of Mauritius (CERD/C/MUS/CO/24-25) (Report). United Nations.
- Committee on the Elimination of Racial Discrimination (3 October 2016). Concluding observations on the twenty-first to twenty-third periodic reports of the United Kingdom (CERD/C/GBR/CO/21-23) (Report).
- Committee on the Elimination of Racial Discrimination (24 September 2024). Concluding observations on the twenty-fourth to twenty-sixth periodic reports of the United Kingdom (CERD/C/GBR/CO/24-26) (Report).
- Committee on the Elimination of Racial Discrimination (2 December 2025). Decision 1 (2025): Mauritius and the United Kingdom (early warning and urgent action procedure, INT/CERD/EWU/11263), advance unedited version (Report). Office of the United Nations High Commissioner for Human Rights.
- Government of Mauritius (11 February 2022). Combined twenty-fourth and twenty-fifth periodic reports submitted by Mauritius under article 9 of the Convention, due in 2021 (CERD/C/MUS/24-25) (Report). Committee on the Elimination of Racial Discrimination.
- University of Mauritius; National Heritage Fund (Mauritius) (2018). Sega Tambour Chagos: extract from the Republic of Mauritius National Inventory of Intangible Cultural Heritage, submitted with nomination file No. 01490 (PDF) (Report). UNESCO.
- Ministry of Arts and Culture (Mauritius) (26 March 2018). Nomination file No. 01490 for inscription in 2019 on the List of Intangible Cultural Heritage in Need of Urgent Safeguarding: Sega Tambour Chagos (DOC) (Report). UNESCO Intergovernmental Committee for the Safeguarding of the Intangible Cultural Heritage.
- "Chagossians should be centre stage in negotiations between Mauritius and the UK: UN experts" (Press release). Office of the United Nations High Commissioner for Human Rights. 10 October 2024.
- "Agreement between Mauritius and the UK fails to guarantee rights of Chagossians, say UN experts" (Press release). Office of the United Nations High Commissioner for Human Rights. 10 June 2025.
- United Nations Human Rights Committee (29 October 2001). Concluding observations: United Kingdom of Great Britain and Northern Ireland (CCPR/CO/73/UK) (Report).
- United Nations Human Rights Committee (30 July 2008). Concluding observations: United Kingdom of Great Britain and Northern Ireland (CCPR/C/GBR/CO/6) (PDF) (Report).
- United Nations Special Procedures (21 February 2023). Letter from the Special Rapporteur on minority issues, the Working Group of Experts on People of African Descent and three other mandate-holders to the Government of the United Kingdom (AL GBR 1/2023) (Report). Office of the United Nations High Commissioner for Human Rights.
- "Decision of the Intergovernmental Committee: 14.COM 10.A.3". Intangible Cultural Heritage. UNESCO. 2019.
- "Sega tambour Chagos". Intangible Cultural Heritage. UNESCO. 2019.

=== Treaties and official documents ===
- "Chagossian Records". British Indian Ocean Territory Administration.
- "British Overseas Territories Act 2002 (c. 8)". legislation.gov.uk.
- "List of Ministers – 06 May 2026". Prime Minister's Office, Republic of Mauritius. Cabinet Office. 6 May 2026.
- Chagos Islands Community Association (12 February 2008). "Written evidence to the Foreign Affairs Committee: Overseas Territories". House of Commons.
- "Civil Status Act 1981 (Act 23 of 1981), consolidated text" (PDF). Civil Status Division, Government of Mauritius.
- "The British Overseas Territories Act 2002 (Commencement) Order 2002 (SI 2002/1252)". legislation.gov.uk. 1 May 2002.
- "Council leaders warn of crisis situation unless government pays costs of Chagossians' resettlement" (Press release). Crawley Borough Council. 15 November 2022.
- "Council leader writes to government for a third time over funding concerns" (Press release). Crawley Borough Council. 9 October 2023.
- "Chagossian arrivals in Crawley" (Press release). Crawley Borough Council. 14 June 2024.
- "The Criminal Code (Amendment) Act 2021 (Act No. 17 of 2021)" (PDF). National Assembly of Mauritius. 29 November 2021. Archived (PDF) from the original on 31 July 2024.
- Duncan, Alan (16 November 2016). "Update on the British Indian Ocean Territory (HCWS260)". UK Parliament: Written questions, answers and statements.
- "Repeal of section 76B of the Mauritian Criminal Code by the National Assembly in Mauritius". GOV.UK. Foreign, Commonwealth and Development Office. 30 October 2025.
- House of Commons Foreign Affairs Committee (23 January 2008). Overseas Territories: Oral evidence, 23 January 2008 (Q170) (Report). UK Parliament.
- "Mrs Navarre-Marie, of Chagossian descent, sworn in as first woman Deputy Prime Minister of Mauritius". Government of Mauritius. Government Information Service, Prime Minister's Office. 6 May 2026.
- "Chagos Islands". Hansard, House of Commons. 17 November 2016.
- "Diego Garcia Military Base and British Indian Ocean Territory Bill". Hansard, House of Lords. 25 November 2025.
- "Diego Garcia Military Base and British Indian Ocean Territory Bill". Hansard, House of Lords. 25 November 2025.
- "Chagossians: Trust Fund and Resettlement". Hansard, House of Commons. 16 December 2025.
- "Diego Garcia Military Base and British Indian Ocean Territory Bill". Hansard, House of Lords. 5 January 2026.
- Doughty, Stephen (15 December 2025). "Chagossians and the Diego Garcia Base Treaty (HCWS1166)". UK Parliament: Written questions, answers and statements.
- HM Passport Office (16 April 2024). "British Indian Ocean Territory: Knowledge Base profile". GOV.UK.
- Home Office (2022). "Nationality and Borders Bill: Chagossian nationality factsheet". GOV.UK.
- Home Office (20 July 2026). "Registration as a British Overseas Territories citizen and British citizen: Chagossian descendant". GOV.UK.
- House of Lords International Agreements Committee (25 June 2025). UK-Mauritius Agreement on the Chagos Archipelago including Diego Garcia (PDF) (Report). 9th Report of Session 2024–26, HL Paper 146. House of Lords.
- House of Lords International Relations and Defence Committee (17 December 2025). Chagossian views on the UK–Mauritius Chagos Agreement (PDF) (Report). 2nd Report of Session 2024–26, HL Paper 234. House of Lords.
- Loft, Philip; Curtis, John (8 September 2025). 2025 treaty on the British Indian Ocean Territory/Chagos Archipelago (Report). Research Briefing CBP-10273. House of Commons Library.
- Prime Minister's Office (Mauritius) (12 December 2025). Highlights of Cabinet Meeting – Friday 12 December 2025 (PDF) (Report). Government of Mauritius.
- Mills, Claire (8 February 2021). Disputes over the British Indian Ocean Territory: February 2021 update (Report). Briefing Paper 9134. House of Commons Library.
- Newton, Robert (1964). Report on the Anglo-American Survey in the Indian Ocean (PDF) (Report). TNA CO 1036/1332 – via Memorial of Mauritius, Annex 2.
- Rammell, Bill (15 June 2004). "British Indian Ocean Territory (written ministerial statement)". Hansard, House of Commons. pp. 32WS–34WS.
- British-Chagossian households in Greater Manchester (PDF) (Report). Salford CVS. 24 March 2025.
- Sisco, Joseph J. (1969). "37. Memorandum From the Assistant Secretary of State for Near Eastern and South Asian Affairs (Sisco) to Secretary of State Rogers, 24 June 1969". Foreign Relations of the United States, 1969–1976, Volume XXIV, Middle East Region and Arabian Peninsula, 1969–1972; Jordan, September 1970. Office of the Historian, United States Department of State.
- Agreement between the Government of the United Kingdom of Great Britain and Northern Ireland and the Government of the Republic of Mauritius concerning the Chagos Archipelago including Diego Garcia (CS Mauritius No.1/2025, CP 1334) (Report). Foreign, Commonwealth and Development Office. 22 May 2025.
- Posner, Michael; Gordon, Philip; Shapiro, Andrew (n.d.), "Response to We the People Petition on Redressing Wrongs Against the Chagossians", We the People, The White House Archived by the National Archives and Records Administration on its We the People archive site (petitions.obamawhitehouse.archives.gov), with the text of the petition and its final signature count.
- Doughty, Stephen (12 January 2026). "Chagossians: British Nationality (101360)". UK Parliament: Written questions, answers and statements.
- Malhotra, Seema (3 March 2025). "British Indian Ocean Territory: British Nationality (31253)". UK Parliament: Written questions, answers and statements.
- Doughty, Stephen (9 June 2025). "Chagossians: Finance (54743)". UK Parliament: Written questions, answers and statements.
- Norris, Alex (22 October 2024). "Chagossians: Housing (8577)". UK Parliament: Written questions, answers and statements.
- Malhotra, Seema (25 October 2024). "British Nationality: Chagossians (9420)". UK Parliament: Written questions, answers and statements.
- Baroness Taylor of Bolton (10 November 2025). "Homelessness: Chagossians (HL11190)". UK Parliament: Written questions, answers and statements.
- Lord Hanson of Flint (26 January 2026). "British Nationality: Chagossians (HL13236)". UK Parliament: Written questions, answers and statements.

=== Books and journals ===
- Ballgobin, Dehoutee Vina (2014). "Le patrimoine musical de la République de Maurice : L'Archipel des Chagos (1900–1950)". Revue historique de l'océan Indien (in French) (11): 600–615.
- Edis, Richard (1993). Peak of Limuria: The Story of Diego Garcia (PDF). London: Bellew Publishing. ISBN 1-85725-070-2 – via Written Statement of the Republic of Mauritius (ICJ), vol. IV, Annex 136 (extracts).
- Engelhard, Alice (2026). "Imperial mobilities, errantry, and the displacement of the Chagos Islanders". Review of International Studies: 1–27. doi:10.1017/S0260210525101034.
- "La dernière colonie". Festival d'Avignon. 2022.
- "Diego Garcia". Fitzcarraldo Editions.
- Jeffery, Laura (2024). "Political and legal debates about Chagossian ethnicity and indigeneity". In Jeffery, Laura; Monaghan, C.; O'Gorman, M. (eds.). Challenges and Prospects for the Chagos Archipelago. Small State Studies. London: Routledge. doi:10.4324/9781003390299-10. Page numbers cited are those of the author's accepted manuscript in the Edinburgh Research Explorer.
- Jeffery, Laura; Rotter, Rebecca (2019). "Safeguarding sega: transmission, inscription, and appropriation of Chagossian intangible cultural heritage". International Journal of Heritage Studies. 25 (10): 1020–1033. doi:10.1080/13527258.2018.1555671.
- Kasstan, Jonathan; Allen, Patrick; Nellan, Pascalina; Sheehan, Michelle (2024). "Chagossian Creole (Indian Ocean and Western Europe) – Language Snapshot". Language Documentation and Description. 24 (1): 1–7. doi:10.25894/ldd.2492.
- "Silence of the Chagos". Restless Books.
- Spear, Thomas C. "Shenaz Patel". Île en île (in French). Lehman College, City University of New York.
- Vine, David (2009). Island of Shame: The Secret History of the U.S. Military Base on Diego Garcia (PDF). Princeton University Press. ISBN 978-0-691-13869-5 – via Written Statement of the Republic of Mauritius (ICJ), vol. V, Annex 151 (extracts).

=== News and other sources ===
- "Diego l'interdite". Africultures (in French).
- Arjanee, Ameerah (2 October 2026). "UK-Mauritius Chagos sovereignty deal stalls amid fears of further delays". Al Jazeera English.
- Anderson, Janet H. (22 November 2024). "Will the Chagos treaty address the wrongs of the past?". JusticeInfo.net.
- Armour, Katie (31 January 2021). "Just £12,000 of £40m fund for displaced Chagos islanders has been spent". The Observer.
- Badshah, Nadeem (17 February 2026). "Four Chagossians return to islands in attempt to stop British transfer to Mauritius". The Guardian.
- "In pictures: Chagossians' visit". BBC News. 10 April 2006. Archived from the original on 3 March 2019.
- Bontemps, Frankie (21 February 2024). "Chagossian Voices". Brighton & Hove Museums.
- "Chagossian Voices". Brighton & Hove Museums. 21 February 2024.
- Burford, Rachael (10 March 2025). "Cash-strapped London borough issues warning over homeless Chagos Islanders flying into Heathrow". Evening Standard.
- Carey, Sean (3 April 2012). "Britain's other islanders petition the White House". New Statesman.
- Carey, Sean (20 December 2012). "Charlesia Alexis dies before hearing European Court of Human Rights ruling". Mauritius Times.
- Chagossian Voices (January 2024). Report for Foreign Affairs on Overseas Territories: Chagos and Chagossians (PDF) (Report). Self-published; cited only for the group's own account of itself and its views.
- Chambers, Bala (22 October 2021). "Will Britain give citizenship rights to all Chagos islanders?". Al Jazeera English.
- Clarke, George (28 May 2016). "The World Cup you've never heard of, where the teams have no state". New Statesman.
- "Clement Siatous: Sagren". Contemporary And. 24 July 2015.
- "Guy Bruno Mandarin: 'A Monument for Fernand on Perhos Banos'". News on Sunday. Le Défi Media Group. 28 October 2017.
- "Fête nationale : Marie Liseby Elysé accède au rang de MSK : « Je me sens très fière et contente »". Le Défi Media (in French). 12 March 2019.
- "Arianne Navarre-Marie : une femme debout" [Arianne Navarre-Marie: a woman standing tall]. Le Défi Media (in French). 26 January 2025.
- Demetriadi, Alexi (22 June 2017). "Lost in exile: The forgotten Chagos Islanders". New Internationalist.
- Diver, Tony (5 June 2025). "Starmer's Chagos deal reported to UN human rights chiefs". The Daily Telegraph.
- Dombrowski, Katja (15 August 2021). "The last colony". D+C Development and Cooperation.
- "Audrey Albert: Belongers". Ffotogallery. 23 January 2025.
- Freedland, Jonathan (28 May 2009). "A Black and Disgraceful Site". The New York Review of Books.
- Harding, Andrew (27 December 2019). "Chagos Islands dispute: UK accused of 'crimes against humanity' by Mauritius". BBC News.
- Harding, Andrew (12 February 2022). "Chagos islanders in emotional, historic trip home". BBC News.
- Baldwin, Clive; Human Rights Watch (15 February 2023). "That's When the Nightmare Started": UK and US Forced Displacement of the Chagossians and Ongoing Colonial Crimes (PDF) (Report). Human Rights Watch. ISBN 979-8-88708-029-1.
- "Rights-Chagos: 'My Navel is Buried There'". Inter Press Service. 21 November 2009.
- "Chagos Islanders living in Sussex criticise 'problematic' flag raising by Mauritius". ITV News Meridian. 14 February 2022. Archived from the original on 25 July 2025.
- "Dozens of displaced Chagos islanders offered UK citizenship sleeping on Crawley leisure centre floor". ITV News Meridian. 14 June 2024. Archived from the original on 4 October 2024.
- Kunda, James (12 March 2026). "Seychelles backs Mauritius efforts to restore sovereignty over Chagos Archipelago". Anadolu Agency.
- "La population chagossienne en chiffres" [The Chagossian population in figures]. L'Express (in French). 5 July 2016.
- "Ile Maurice: «Qui sont les plus légitimes ? Les déracinés ou les troisièmes générations nées au pays ?»". L'Express (in French). 8 November 2025 – via allAfrica.
- "Ile Maurice: Le gouvernement finalise le plan du retour" [Mauritius: The government finalises the return plan]. L'Express (in French). 5 November 2025 – via allAfrica.
- "Ile Maurice: Le pays conteste les préoccupations du Comité de l'ONU" [Mauritius: The country disputes the UN committee's concerns]. L'Express (in French). 14 December 2025 – via allAfrica.
- "Ile Maurice: Le gouvernement affirme agir dans l'intérêt des Chagossiens" [Mauritius: The government says it is acting in the Chagossians' interest]. L'Express (in French). 19 December 2025 – via allAfrica.
- "Ile Maurice: Des inquiétudes exprimées sur la gouvernance du Trust Fund par Chagossian Voices" [Mauritius: Chagossian Voices raises concerns about the governance of the Trust Fund]. L'Express (in French). 9 January 2026 – via allAfrica.
- "Ile Maurice: Navin Ramgoolam - «Je connais les capacités d'Arianne Navarre-Marie»" [Mauritius: Navin Ramgoolam – "I know Arianne Navarre-Marie's abilities"]. L'Express (in French). 6 May 2026 – via allAfrica.
- "Ile Maurice: Arianne Navarre-Marie n°2 du gouvernement" [Mauritius: Arianne Navarre-Marie number two in the government]. L'Express (in French). 22 April 2026 – via allAfrica.
- Lawal, Shola (4 October 2024). "Why is the UK handing the Chagos Islands back to Mauritius?". Al Jazeera English.
- "A sorrowful year for the Chagossian community: Charlesia Alexis said farewell to the world on a cold morning yesterday". Le Mauricien. 17 December 2012.
- "Tribute to late barrister Hervé Lassémillante". Le Mauricien. 29 July 2020.
- "Audrey Albert (artiste photographe) : « Il faut plus de visibilité pour la communauté chagossienne »". Le Mauricien (in French). 23 May 2021.
- "Olivier Bancoult : « Le 12 mars est toujours un jour de tristesse pour les Chagossiens ! »" [Olivier Bancoult: "12 March is still a day of sadness for the Chagossians!"]. Le Mauricien (in French). 14 March 2022.
- "À Pointe-aux-Sables : les « natifs » du Chagos tiennent tête à la BOT Citizen Platform". Le Mauricien (in French). 28 November 2024.
- "Chagos : la revendication maldivienne ouvre un nouveau front diplomatique". Le Mauricien (in French). 14 September 2026.
- Lebrasse, Sarah Jane (12 October 2023). "Sovereignty and decolonization: Chagos Islanders confront their postcolonial future". Le Mauricien.
- Lynch, David (14 February 2022). "UK 'in no doubt' over Chagos Islands after Mauritius plants flag". North Wales Live. PA Media.
- Lynch, David; Ng, Ellie (14 October 2026). "Badenoch and Farage both dig in amid row over Falklands-Chagos 'trade' proposal". Nation.Cymru. PA Media.
- Maddox, David; Mitchell, Archie (11 June 2025). "United Nations experts call for Starmer's Chagos deal to be suspended". The Independent.
- Mallinder, Lorraine (11 February 2025). "'Tug of war': Chagos Islands deal tearing families apart in Mauritius". Al Jazeera English.
- Mallinder, Lorraine (10 March 2026). "The Belongers: What the Chagos Islands tells us about the new world order". Coda Story.
- Martin, Daniel (16 December 2025). "Chagos Islanders defy Starmer by forming government in exile". The Telegraph. Archived from the original on 17 December 2025.
- McQue, Katie (2 May 2024). "Chagos Islanders fear loss of identity as birth certificates altered to remove disputed homeland". The Guardian.
- McVeigh, Karen (7 June 2019). "'I want to die on my native soil': exiled Chagos Islanders dream of return". The Guardian.
- "Chagossians take struggle for justice to the heart of British government". Minority Rights Group International. 22 November 2004.
- "Submission from Minority Rights Group International". Select Committee on Foreign Affairs: Written Evidence. House of Commons. 12 October 2007.
- "Chagossians/Ilois in Mauritius". World Directory of Minorities and Indigenous Peoples. Minority Rights Group International. Archived from the original on 22 April 2024.
- Morrison, Alex (23 February 2011). "Meet the world's smallest democratic government". openDemocracy.
- Ngari, Allan (28 August 2025). "Chagos Archipelago Residents Deserve Reparations, Not Regrets". Human Rights Watch.
- "UK actions over Chagos Islands 'crimes against humanity', says rights group". Inverness Courier. PA Media. 15 February 2023.
- Peerthum, Satyendra (16 October 2018). "The Story of the Settlement of Diego Garcia and the Chagos Archipelago". Le Mauricien.
- Pilger, John. "Stealing a Nation". johnpilger.com.
- Ridgwell, Henry (10 March 2025). "British plan to cede Chagos Islands sovereignty prompts concerns over China threat". Voice of America.
- Riley, Henry (14 February 2025). "Chagossians beg to return to their homeland, as LBC visits their lunch club in Crawley". LBC.
- "Programme Awards Winners 2004". Royal Television Society. Archived from the original on 5 March 2014.
- "Chagossian activists challenge legality of new bilateral agreement". Seychelles Nation. 10 June 2025.
- "New hearing for Chagossian community in Seychelles has opened in UK". Seychelles News Agency. 14 December 2018 – via Seychelles Broadcasting Corporation.
- "Seychelles-based Chagossians to boycott heritage visits to the islands for 2nd straight year". Seychelles News Agency. 14 June 2019 – via Seychelles Broadcasting Corporation.
- "Struggles of the displaced people of Chagos islands featured in exhibition in Seychelles". Seychelles Broadcasting Corporation. Seychelles News Agency. 6 April 2019.
- "Born in the Chagos Islands and longing for the right to return: SNA interview with Pierre Prosper". Seychelles News Agency. 17 October 2020 – via Seychelles Broadcasting Corporation.
- "New UN tribunal ruling gives Chagossians in Seychelles further hope for return home". Seychelles News Agency. 1 February 2021 – via Seychelles Broadcasting Corporation.
- Snow, Jon (23 May 2019). "President of Chagos Islands Council: 'We prefer to stay a British overseas territory'". Channel 4 News.
- Stacey, Kiran (5 November 2026). "Burnham wants to 'recast' Chagos Islands deal after US resistance". The Guardian.
- "Thousands of Chagossians would leave Crawley for homeland, says community leader". Sussex Express. 27 April 2016.
- Syal, Rajeev (1 September 2022). "Evicted Chagos Islanders' descendants to get British citizenship". The Guardian.
- Thomas, Fernando (3 April 2025). "Accord sur les Chagos : Londres réaffirme son engagement, mais la diaspora reste divisée". Le Défi Media (in French).
- "A Few Man Fridays". Time Out. 20 February 2012.
- "Charlésia, la voix du paradis perdu". Témoignages (in French). 15 October 2004.
- UK Chagos Support Association (10 November 2022). "Closure statement: UK Chagos Support Association". Archived from the original on 17 April 2023. Self-published; cited only for the association's own account of itself.
- Underwood, Joseph (5 October 2015). "Memory, between nostalgia and archive". Africa Is a Country.
- Wallen, Joe (25 November 2021). "Britain's secret second Windrush scandal". The New European.
- Wenban-Smith, Nigel (11 January 2008). "History of the Chagos Archipelago" (PDF). Factsheet 058. Chagos Conservation Trust.
