= Clément Siatous =

Mauritian and British painter

Clément Siatous GOSK
- Born: 17 February 1947 (age 79); Peros Banhos
- Website: https://clementsiatous.cargo.site/

Clément Siatous (born 17 February 1947) is a Mauritian and British painter of Chagossian origin. He is known for his paintings depicting the daily life of the Chagossians before their exile.

== Biography ==
Clément Siatous was born on 17 February 1947 on Diamond Island in the atoll of Peros Banhos, in the Chagos Archipelago. Chagos was at the time a dependent territory of Mauritius, itself a colony of the British Empire. At birth, Clément Siatous was therefore a citizen of the British dependent territories. He lost his father at the age of three, and moved with his family for the first time at the age of five to Diego Garcia, the main island of the archipelago. He then had to move to Mauritius in the 1960s to treat his ailing mother. Like many Chagossians, he was prevented from returning to Chagos by the British authorities and had to stay in Mauritius.

He left school at 16, and began to paint while doing side jobs. He got married at 21 and had ten children. He then obtained Mauritian nationality, and later British nationality. Following an exhibition, the Mauritian President Cassam Uteem decorated him in 1998 as a member of the Order of the Star and Key of the Indian Ocean (MSK), one of the highest honours in Mauritius. In 2011, he was granted a UK-organised visit to the Chagos for the first time since his exile began. He still works from his studio in Port Louis, but travels regularly to the UK, where much of the Chagossian community now lives.

== Work ==
Clément Siatous is a self-taught painter. He earns most of his artistic income from portraits of famous people, but became increasingly well known for his scenes of daily life in Chagos. His aim is to keep the memory of the Chagossians alive, and to prove that his archipelago was permanently inhabited before the exile, unlike what British and American authorities have sometimes said to justify the deportation of the population. His paintings of the Chagos regularly depict work in the coconut plantations, life in the villages, and fishing scenes. Siatous says that he is inspired by his own childhood memories and those of the Chagossian community. However, he hardly ever relies on photographs, as these were very rare in Chagos before the exile, and almost exclusively in black and white. He has stated that he finds it important to paint in a realistic style in order to educate future generations, as the number of people able to tell the story of life in Chagos is rapidly declining. He mainly uses oil or acrylic paint.

He has exhibited his Chagos paintings in Mauritius on several occasions. In 2015, the curator Paula Naughton organised his first exhibition abroad, at the Simon Preston Gallery in New York. Clément Siatous also designed the logo of the Chagos Refugees Group, one of the main organisations representing the Chagossians, of which he is a founding member.

== Exhibitions ==
- Port Louis, 1997
- Sagren, Simon Preston Gallery, New York, 2015
- The Chagos Embassy of Puerto Rico, Embajadada, San Juan, 2016
- Inside the Nest, Simon Preston Gallery, New York, 2017
- CONDO Unit, Galeria Jacqueline Martins, São Paulo, 2018
- CHAGOS: Cultural Heritage Across Generations, Plaza, Rose-Hill, 2018
- New Art Dealers Alliance NADA House, New York, 2021
- Chagossian Islands History, Crawley Museum, Crawley, 2021
