= Audrey Albert =

Mauritian-Chagossian artist and photographer

- Born: Mauritius
- Occupation: Artist

Audrey Albert is a Mauritian artist with Chagossian heritage, whose work reflects the cultural heritage and identities of Chagos Islanders. Her work has been exhibited internationally, and in 2021 she was appointed to a Creative Fellowship at Manchester International Festival.

== Biography ==
Born in Mauritius, to a family of Chagossian heritage, Albert studied political science and communication at the University of Mauritius from 2009 to 2013. She subsequently studied photography at Manchester School of Art from 2015 to 2018.

Albert's artistic practice draws on themes of identity and tradition and draws on Chagossian cultural heritage, primarily through cameraless, analogue and digital photography. Her work Matter Out of Place has been exhibited in Pingyao, Mauritius, Arles, and at the People's History Museum in Manchester. In 2020 she designed Christmas cards, which were sold as part of fund-raising initiatives by the UK Chagos Support Association.

In 2021 she was appointed to a Creative Fellowship by Manchester International Festival, where she worked on a project entitled Chagossians in Manchester. She has also worked as a Young Decision Maker for the theatre Contact MCR, where she was involved in its redevelopment.
