= Agreement concerning the Chagos Archipelago including Diego Garcia =

2025 treaty between the United Kingdom and Mauritius on the Chagos Archipelago

Agreement between the Government of the United Kingdom of Great Britain and Northern Ireland and the Government of the Republic of Mauritius concerning the Chagos Archipelago including Diego Garcia
- Type: Bilateral treaty
- Signed: 22 May 2025
- Location: London and Port Louis
- Effective: Not in force (as of October 2026)
- Condition: Exchange of notes confirming completion of each party's internal procedures (art. 18)
- Signatories: Keir Starmer (United Kingdom); Navin Ramgoolam (Mauritius)
- Parties: United Kingdom; Mauritius
- Languages: English

The Agreement concerning the Chagos Archipelago including Diego Garcia is a treaty between the United Kingdom and Mauritius, signed on 22 May 2025. Under it the United Kingdom accepts that "Mauritius is sovereign over the Chagos Archipelago in its entirety, including Diego Garcia". In return, Mauritius authorises the United Kingdom to lease Diego Garcia, the site of a joint UK–US military base, for an initial period of 99 years. The archipelago has been administered by the United Kingdom as the British Indian Ocean Territory since 1965, when it was detached from Mauritius.

Negotiations were announced in November 2022, three years after an advisory opinion of the International Court of Justice found that the decolonisation of Mauritius had not been lawfully completed. A political agreement was announced in October 2024, renegotiated after a change of government in Mauritius, and signed by the prime ministers Keir Starmer and Navin Ramgoolam after a High Court injunction obtained by a Chagossian, Bertrice Pompe, was lifted on the morning of signature. The United Kingdom agreed to pay Mauritius £165 million a year for three years and £120 million a year thereafter, indexed to inflation from the fourteenth year, together with £40 million for a trust fund for Chagossians and £45 million a year for 25 years for development projects. The British government gave the average cost as £101 million a year in 2025/26 prices and the net present value as £3.4 billion, and Starmer said that the cost would be less than that of running an aircraft carrier for a year; opponents cited the nominal total of about £35 billion. The government argued that the treaty was needed to protect the base from binding international rulings, a risk its opponents disputed.

The treaty was supported by the United States, India, the African Union and the Chagos Refugees Group, and opposed by the Conservative Party, Reform UK, some Chagossian groups and the Maldives; a United Nations committee called for its ratification to be suspended. The US Secretary of State, Marco Rubio, said at its signing that it secured "the long-term, stable, and effective operation" of the base, and Donald Trump praised it. In February 2026, Trump opposed the agreement after the British government was reported to have refused a US request to use Diego Garcia for strikes on Iran. The implementing bill passed the House of Commons, but in April 2026 the government said that an update to the 1966 UK–US agreement on the base, which it needed before ratifying, had become "impossible to agree at political level", and the bill lapsed at the end of the parliamentary session. As of November 2026 the treaty had not entered into force; the government of Andy Burnham said that it could not obtain American consent for the existing arrangements and was in discussion with the United States on how to "recast" them, and Burnham and Ramgoolam agreed to work on a shared plan to make further progress by the end of the year.

== Background ==
The United Kingdom detached the Chagos Archipelago from Mauritius in 1965, before Mauritian independence. It made the archipelago available for US defence purposes under a 1966 agreement, and removed its inhabitants between 1967 and 1973. In 2019 the ICJ advised that the decolonisation of Mauritius "was not lawfully completed" and that the United Kingdom was under an obligation to end its administration of the archipelago "as rapidly as possible". The United Nations General Assembly then demanded the United Kingdom's withdrawal in resolution 73/295. In 2021 a special chamber of the International Tribunal for the Law of the Sea treated Mauritius as the coastal state for the archipelago in its boundary case with the Maldives. The British government's explanatory memorandum to the treaty cited, as consequences of the dispute, the refusal of the Universal Postal Union to accept mail bearing British Indian Ocean Territory stamps, procedural difficulties at the Comprehensive Nuclear-Test-Ban Treaty Organisation, and challenges at the Indian Ocean Tuna Commission.

== Negotiation ==
=== Talks under the Conservative government, 2022–2024 ===
On 3 November 2022 the Foreign Secretary, James Cleverly, announced that, following a meeting at the UN General Assembly between the then Prime Minister, Liz Truss, and Prime Minister Pravind Jugnauth, "the UK and Mauritius have decided to begin negotiations on the exercise of sovereignty over the British Indian Ocean Territory (BIOT)/Chagos Archipelago". He said that any agreement would "ensure the continued effective operation of the joint UK/US military base on Diego Garcia", and that the two governments would keep the United States and India informed. The British government later said that eleven of the thirteen rounds of talks underpinning the treaty were held under the previous government.

=== Political agreement, October 2024 ===
After the 2024 British general election, the government of Keir Starmer appointed Jonathan Powell as special envoy for the negotiations. On 3 October 2024 the two prime ministers announced "an historic political agreement on the exercise of sovereignty over the Chagos Archipelago". Under it the United Kingdom would agree that Mauritius was sovereign, including over Diego Garcia, and would be authorised to exercise Mauritius' sovereign rights over Diego Garcia for an initial 99 years. Mauritius would be "free to implement a programme of resettlement" on the other islands. The US president, Joe Biden, welcomed the agreement, saying that it "secures the effective operation of the joint facility on Diego Garcia into the next century".

=== Renegotiation, 2024–2025 ===
At the Mauritian general election of November 2024, Jugnauth's government was defeated. His successor, Navin Ramgoolam, called the draft agreement a "sellout" and sought revised terms. Ramgoolam later told the Mauritian parliament that the revised draft was "inflation-proof" and included a "front-loaded" payment. In December 2024 and January 2025 the two governments issued joint statements reaffirming their commitment to a treaty under which "Mauritius is sovereign over the Chagos Archipelago". In January 2025 Marco Rubio, the incoming Secretary of State, had said that the deal posed a threat to US security, and Starmer's spokesman said: "It is perfectly reasonable for the new U.S. administration to consider the detail." Receiving Starmer at the White House on 27 February 2025, Trump said: "I think we'll be inclined to go along with your country." According to Reuters, he indicated his backing for the deal after the meeting.

=== Signature ===
On 21 May 2025 Bertrice Pompe, a Chagossian born on Diego Garcia who had criticised the deal for excluding Chagossians, applied for urgent relief to the out-of-hours High Court. A temporary order made at 2.25 am on 22 May prevented the government from taking "any conclusive or legally binding steps" to conclude the negotiations until a hearing later that morning. Mr Justice Chamberlain discharged the order around noon, and the treaty was signed shortly afterwards. The two prime ministers signed it in a virtual ceremony "at London and Port Louis", under an exchange of notes deeming the date of signature to be 22 May 2025. The two foreign ministers also agreed a UK–Mauritius Strategic Partnership Framework covering trade, financial crime, maritime security and climate change.

In a statement to the House of Commons, the Defence Secretary, John Healey, quoted the US Secretary of State, Marco Rubio, as saying that the agreement "secures the long term stable and effective operation of the joint US-UK military facility at Diego Garcia". He said that Trump had described the deal as "very long term" and "very strong". In a statement the same day the State Department said that the United States "welcomed the historic agreement", adding: "We commend both the United Kingdom and Mauritius for their leadership, vision, and commitment to ensure that Diego Garcia remains fully operational for the duration of this agreement." According to the House of Commons Library, Rubio said that the Trump administration had judged that the "agreement secures the long-term, stable, and effective operation of the joint US-UK military facility at Diego Garcia" and that the United States would continue to operate its naval support facility there; the Defense Secretary, Pete Hegseth, echoed these comments. The treaty was laid before Parliament the same day.

== Provisions ==
The treaty has a preamble, nineteen articles and six annexes, and is accompanied by an exchange of notes on signature and two exchanges of letters. The annexes deal with defence and security, jurisdiction, the Joint Commission, arbitration, and charts of the archipelago and of Diego Garcia. The preamble refers to "the decisions of international courts and tribunals, including the International Court of Justice", and to "the need to complete the process of decolonisation of Mauritius".

=== Sovereignty and Diego Garcia ===
Article 1 provides that Mauritius is sovereign over the archipelago "in its entirety, including Diego Garcia". Under Article 2, Mauritius "as sovereign" authorises the United Kingdom to exercise its rights and authorities with respect to Diego Garcia. This covers all those required for "the long-term, secure and effective operation of the Base", and the United Kingdom may authorise the United States to operate the base jointly. For the treaty, "Diego Garcia" means the island and a 12-nautical-mile zone around it, including the airspace above and the seabed and subsoil below.

Mauritius retains title to the land and territorial sea of Diego Garcia and all rights not delegated to the United Kingdom. These expressly include civil and criminal jurisdiction, the issue of coins and stamps, the registration of births, deaths and marriages of Mauritian nationals and persons not connected to the base, postal services and commercial regulation unrelated to the base, sovereignty over natural resources including fisheries, and environmental protection. Except for jurisdiction, coins, stamps and civil registration, these retained powers may be exercised on Diego Garcia only following a decision of the Joint Commission, which requires the agreement of both parties.

Under Article 3 the United Kingdom is to respect Mauritian sovereignty and has "full responsibility for the defence and security of Diego Garcia", and neither party is to "undermine, prejudice or otherwise interfere with" the operation of the base. Article 4 requires compliance with international law in the implementation of the treaty, "including activities in relation to the Base". Under Article 10 the United Kingdom may freely select contractors for the base, but suitably qualified Mauritian nationals and companies are to be employed or preferred "to the maximum extent practicable".

=== Defence and security ===
Under Annex 1 the United Kingdom has, on Diego Garcia, "unrestricted access, basing and overflight" for British and American aircraft and vessels. It also has unrestricted control over armed operations and lethal capabilities, the storage of goods including weapons, the deployment of personnel and the electromagnetic spectrum, and may admit other states' aircraft and vessels on notification to Mauritius, though the construction of artificial islands is excluded. "Unrestricted" is defined as not requiring permission or notification, subject to standing arrangements to be agreed separately. The United Kingdom must "expeditiously inform Mauritius of any armed attack on a third State directly emanating from the Base on Diego Garcia". The British government told Parliament that such notification would take place "after the event".

Elsewhere in the archipelago, British and American vessels and aircraft have unrestricted rights of overflight, navigation and undersea access, and the United Kingdom may maintain and upgrade equipment after notifying Mauritius. The two parties decide jointly on the use of the electromagnetic spectrum, on the presence of other states' security forces (except in humanitarian emergencies, for up to 30 days), and on any installation, sensor or artificial island between 12 and 24 nautical miles from Diego Garcia. Beyond 24 nautical miles, and before any development on the land of the outer islands, Mauritius must conduct a "Security Review" in which the United Kingdom may make submissions; if Mauritius is satisfied that a proposal risks interfering with the base it is not to proceed, and if the parties disagree the matter is decided by the Joint Commission. The United Kingdom may also ask for a review of other activities it considers a risk, and either party may raise serious concerns "at the political level for urgent consultations". The British government described these provisions as including a "24 nautical mile buffer zone" and "a strict ban on foreign security forces on the outer islands". Each party undertakes not to enter into future international obligations that conflict with the treaty.

=== Further security provisions ===
Besides the rights and zones described above, the treaty contains further provisions directed at the operation of the base:

- On Diego Garcia the United Kingdom controls the storage of all goods, including fuels and weapons; the deployment of military, civilian and contract personnel, over whom it has "exclusive command and control"; the installation of communication and electronic systems and cables; the policing of the island; and the access of persons and goods. It may use the land, surrounding waters and seabed for defence purposes.
- Beyond Diego Garcia, states operating with the United Kingdom or the United States have the same unrestricted rights as British and American vessels and aircraft, subject to notification for overflight and undersea access.
- The United Kingdom is to help Mauritius to "monitor, detect, and adjudicate security risks" and to conduct Security Reviews, and if an activity requiring a joint decision takes place without authorisation, or the electromagnetic spectrum is used or interfered with without authorisation, the parties are to cooperate to bring it to an end.
- The United Kingdom may make agreements with other states on jurisdiction over their personnel and property; a British certificate is conclusive proof that an act was done in the course of official duties in relation to the base; and Mauritius is not liable for third-party claims arising from the operation of the base, which the United Kingdom answers.
- Each party confirms that its existing international obligations do not conflict with the treaty, and that the treaty does not affect them except as it expressly provides. The British government nevertheless said that an update to the 1966 UK–US exchange of notes was necessary before ratification (see below).

The arrangements at the International Telecommunication Union, the Joint Commission's unanimity rule, the limited grounds for termination and the right of first refusal are described in the sections below.

At the signing, Healey described the result as "Full control of Diego Garcia for the next 99 years and beyond" and "Full control and protection of the electromagnetic spectrum", and told the Commons: "We have secured an effective veto on all development in the Chagos archipelago."

=== Jurisdiction ===
Under Annex 2 the United Kingdom has the criminal and civil jurisdiction "necessary to administer and operate the Base", and may make agreements with other states on jurisdiction over their personnel. Mauritius has primary criminal jurisdiction on Diego Garcia over its own nationals who are not British or American service personnel, and over persons not connected to the base, including in cases of unlicensed fishing and trafficking. British courts have jurisdiction over claims in tort arising on Diego Garcia, with limited exceptions for Mauritian claimants, and the United Kingdom answers third-party claims arising from the operation of the base. The House of Lords International Agreements Committee noted that, as a consequence of the change of sovereignty, "Mauritius will become the state responsible for asylum claims made by persons arriving in the Chagos Archipelago, including Diego Garcia".

=== Chagossians and resettlement ===
The preamble records that "past treatment of Chagossians has left a deeply regrettable legacy", and recognises "the wrongs of the past". Article 6 provides that Mauritius "is free to implement a programme of resettlement on the islands of the Chagos Archipelago other than Diego Garcia", in conformity with the treaty and Mauritian law. The International Agreements Committee described Article 6 as "in substance declaratory", adding: "It does not secure the right to return of the Chagossian community."

The United Kingdom is to pay £40 million to capitalise a trust fund for the benefit of Chagossians, to be established by Mauritius through regulations under its Finance and Audit Act after consulting the United Kingdom on its operation. The committee said that the treaty gave no detail of how the trust fund and the development grant would be administered, and that "Greater clarity on this is needed." In December 2025 a British minister told the House of Commons that the Mauritian government had approved a bill under which the fund would be managed by a twelve-member board with a Chagossian majority and chair, including a representative of UK-based Chagossians. He said that Mauritius had confirmed that eligibility to resettle would extend to Chagossians born in the archipelago before 31 December 1973 and their children, and that UK-based Chagossians meeting the criteria would be eligible for Mauritian citizenship.

=== Environment ===
The United Kingdom must exercise its rights in accordance with international environmental law "and with due regard to applicable Mauritian environmental laws". It agrees to support Mauritius in establishing and managing its own marine protected area in the archipelago, on terms to be agreed in a separate instrument, and the parties are to cooperate on spills and illegal, unreported and unregulated fishing. The United Kingdom retains responsibility for the environmental protection of the Ramsar wetland site on Diego Garcia under a separate arrangement.

=== Payments ===
Under Article 11, the United Kingdom agrees "in consideration of this Agreement" to pay Mauritius an annual sum, to capitalise the trust fund for Chagossians, and to fund a development framework for 25 years. The treaty "constitutes the full and final settlement of all claims by Mauritius in relation to the Chagos Archipelago". An exchange of letters signed the same day sets the amounts:

- an annual payment of £165 million for each of the first three years and £120 million for each of years four to thirteen;
- from the fourteenth year, an annual payment equal to the previous year's payment adjusted for inflation using the UK GDP deflator;
- £40 million for the Chagossian trust fund, payable after the first anniversary of entry into force; and
- a grant of £45 million a year for 25 years, starting after the third anniversary, for projects "that promote the ongoing economic development and welfare of Mauritius and its people", which are to involve British businesses "to the maximum extent practicable".

The first annual payment falls due on the first day of the month after entry into force. The development grant is not indexed to inflation. The British government gave the average cost as £101 million a year in 2025/26 prices and the net present value as £3.4 billion, figures it said were verified by the Government Actuary's Department. The disputed measurement of this cost is discussed below.

=== International organisations ===
The United Kingdom agrees to make its membership of international organisations consistent with Mauritian sovereignty. Under an exchange of letters, on entry into force it is to cease to act as sovereign for the archipelago in UN bodies and to change its status in, among others, the Indian Ocean Tuna Commission, from coastal state to distant-water fishing nation. Mauritius is to represent the whole archipelago at the International Telecommunication Union under a special arrangement allowing the United Kingdom to register and keep frequency assignments, and the United Kingdom remains responsible for three monitoring stations of the Comprehensive Nuclear-Test-Ban Treaty Organisation in the archipelago.

=== Joint Commission, disputes and termination ===
A Joint Commission of five members from each party, which must meet at least every six months, oversees implementation; the United States may raise issues and send a representative to give views and advice. All its decisions require the agreement of both parties. Disputes are to be submitted to the Joint Commission and, if unresolved after three months, "settled exclusively by negotiations between the Parties at an appropriately high level"; a party with essential security concerns may request consultations between the prime ministers.

Mauritius may terminate the treaty only if the United Kingdom fails to make the payments, or in the event of an armed attack or threat of an armed attack on Mauritius by the United Kingdom, or an armed attack on Mauritius "directly emanating from the Base on Diego Garcia". An "armed attack" excludes action authorised by the Security Council, self-defence under Article 51 of the UN Charter, and activity with Mauritian consent. If the United Kingdom does not accept a termination, the matter goes to the Joint Commission, after which the United Kingdom may begin arbitration; if it does not do so within 30 days, the treaty terminates. The five-member arbitral tribunal sits in The Hague, with the Permanent Court of Arbitration as registry, and its decisions are final.

=== Duration and entry into force ===
The treaty lasts 99 years from entry into force and may be extended by 40 years if the parties agree the conditions no later than two years before expiry, and further thereafter by agreement. If it is not extended, Mauritius grants the United Kingdom, for 40 years, a right of first refusal over the use of Diego Garcia "on the same terms as may be offered to any third State or third party". The treaty enters into force on the first day of the month after both parties have notified each other that their internal procedures are complete. The British explanatory memorandum expected this to take no more than six months.

== Ratification and implementation ==
=== Parliamentary scrutiny in the United Kingdom ===
Under the Constitutional Reform and Governance Act 2010, the treaty was laid before Parliament on 22 May 2025 for 21 sitting days, ending on 3 July 2025. An early day motion opposing ratification, tabled by the Leader of the Opposition, Kemi Badenoch, received 107 signatures but carried no right to a debate. On 30 June 2025 the House of Lords rejected by 205 votes to 185 a Conservative motion that the government should not ratify, and a Liberal Democrat motion was withdrawn after the government promised a statement on resettlement and the trust fund. The scrutiny period ended without a resolution against ratification. The government follows the practice of not ratifying a treaty until it can implement it in domestic law.

The Lords International Agreements Committee reported in June 2025 that the treaty "reflects a compromise between the views of the two Parties. It is not perfect." It listed the high cost, the lack of a guaranteed right of return and uncertainty about the marine protected area, but concluded that if the treaty were not ratified "Mauritius is likely to resume its campaign through international courts", which would put the base "at greater risk".

=== Implementing legislation ===
The Diego Garcia Military Base and British Indian Ocean Territory Bill was introduced in the House of Commons on 15 July 2025. It would end British sovereignty over the territory when the treaty entered into force, revoke the territory's 2004 constitution, keep existing law in force on Diego Garcia, and amend nationality law. The Commons gave it a second reading on 9 September 2025 by 330 votes to 179 and a third reading on 20 October 2025 by 320 votes to 171. In the House of Lords it had its second reading on 4 November 2025, committee stage in November, report on 5 January 2026 and third reading on 12 January 2026.

The Lords made six amendments. They would have delayed the main provisions until the government had sought to amend Article 11 so that payments would stop if military use of the base became impossible, or until a referendum of Chagossians had been held on guaranteeing their rights to resettlement and to involvement in the trust fund; required a statement of the treaty's real-terms cost and the methodology of the discount used; and required Commons approval of estimates of expenditure under the treaty. On 20 January 2026 the Commons accepted one amendment and rejected the others, voting by 344 to 182 against the amendment on payments, with three Labour MPs voting against the government on some of the motions. The Speaker did not select an amendment tabled by Nigel Farage and others for a referendum of Chagossians on sovereignty.

The bill was then due to return to the Lords, but the government removed it from the order paper after the Conservatives tabled an amendment calling for a pause "in light of the changing geopolitical circumstances". A Labour source attributed the delay to what it called a "wrecking amendment" rather than to Trump's comments of that week. According to the Anadolu Agency, the Conservatives argued that the deal "could violate a 60-year-old treaty with the US that enshrines British sovereignty over the archipelago".

=== United States position and the pause ===
On 20 January 2026 Trump criticised the agreement on Truth Social. The British government said it believed the United States still supported the deal. In early February Trump appeared to signal approval, but said that the United States would "retain the right to militarily secure and reinforce the American presence in Diego Garcia" if it were threatened. On 17 February the State Department announced security talks with Mauritius in Port Louis and said that the United States "supports the decision of the United Kingdom to proceed with its agreement with Mauritius". In mid-February British media reported, citing government sources, that Starmer had refused a US request to use Diego Garcia and RAF Fairford for any pre-emptive strike on Iran; according to The Times, the government was concerned that allowing it "would be a breach of international law". The Ministry of Defence declined to comment on what it called operational matters. On 18 February, the day after the State Department's statement, Trump wrote on Truth Social that Starmer was "making a big mistake" in agreeing the lease, that "It may be necessary for the United States to use Diego Garcia, and the Airfield located in Fairford, in order to eradicate a potential attack by a highly unstable and dangerous Regime" The White House press secretary, Karoline Leavitt, said that the post should be taken as the administration's "policy". According to The Hill, The Times reported that the refusal was the basis of Trump's renewed criticism of the deal.

After American and Israeli strikes on Iran began at the end of February, Starmer said on 1 March that he would allow the United States to use Diego Garcia for "specific and limited defensive purposes", while not joining the offensive. Trump told The Daily Telegraph that he was "very disappointed" in Starmer, that the initial refusal had "never happened between our countries before", and that "It sounds like he was worried about the legality"; the newspaper wrote that "The row over Diego Garcia led the president to withdraw his support" for the treaty. Starmer told the Commons that he stood by his "deliberate decision" not to take part in the initial strikes. CNN had placed Trump's January criticism "amid a general fraying of US-European diplomatic ties over his designs on Greenland".

Answering an urgent question on 25 February 2026, the Foreign Office minister Hamish Falconer told the Commons: "We are pausing for discussions with our American counterparts." The government denied that the process had been paused, though it was understood that it could not proceed without American support. On 13 April 2026 the minister Stephen Doughty said that the position of the US President "appears to have changed in recent weeks", making it "impossible to agree at political level" an update to the 1966 UK–US exchange of notes on the defence use of the territory, which he described as "necessary to ratify the treaty". He said that a text had been agreed at official level, but that the bill could not complete its passage in the session and could not be carried over. The government remained, he said, "confident that the Diego Garcia treaty is the best means of protecting the full operation of the military base".

The 2024–26 session ended on 29 April 2026 and the bill made no further progress. It was not included in the King's Speech opening the new session in May, an omission welcomed by opponents of the treaty in the Lords.

=== Developments under Burnham, 2026 ===
Andy Burnham succeeded Starmer as prime minister in July 2026. On 1 September a Foreign Office minister told the Commons that "the US Government must be content with the agreement before we proceed in ratifying the treaty", and that funding would come from existing departmental budgets. On 21 September Burnham said that the government remained "determined to secure the long-term operation of the base", and said: "The assurance I gave was I will work towards a resolution". At their first meeting, at the UN General Assembly on 22 September, Trump said that he expected Burnham to reconsider the deal. The next day the Defence Secretary, Wes Streeting, said that Trump's remarks "provide absolute clarity that his position on this Chagos deal as currently drafted is not changing", that more work was needed with the United States, and that Britain would not "at this stage" make the agreed payments.

On 26 September Ramgoolam travelled to the United Kingdom for talks with the National Security Adviser, Jonathan Powell. According to The Daily Telegraph, as reported by Eastern Eye, he warned that Mauritius was prepared to "take the legal route" unless the deadlock was "expeditiously resolved". On 12 October Burnham told the Commons that he had discussed the issue in New York and would secure the future of the base. On 13 October a government minister told the House of Lords that "an agreement with Mauritius must protect UK interests and command US support", and that "We will return to the Bill in due course." On 23 October the House of Lords gave a second reading to a private member's bill introduced by Lord Weir of Ballyholme, which would restrict any transfer of sovereignty "without the approval of Parliament and without the consent of the Chagossian people"; the government opposed it, rejecting "the Bill's call for a referendum". On 27 October the Foreign Secretary, Ed Miliband, told the Commons that "under this US Administration, we will not get consent for the current arrangements", but that the government continued "to work with the US and Mauritius to safeguard our security interests".

Burnham and Ramgoolam met during the leaders' retreat at the Commonwealth Heads of Government Meeting in Antigua on 4 November 2026; according to Downing Street they agreed "to work on a shared plan to make further progress by the end of the year", and Ramgoolam's office said that he had stressed the need for a clear roadmap with a first deadline in December 2026. Returning from the summit, Burnham told The Economist that the government was in discussion with the United States "to see how we might recast the arrangement that better meets their concerns", and said of the agreement reached over Greenland: "maybe there is something there we can take from that".

=== Mauritius ===
In December 2025 the Mauritian government approved a bill to establish the trust fund for Chagossians. In March 2026 Ramgoolam said that his government was "exploring legal avenues in the Chagos case" because of the delay, and that the 2026–27 budget would need to find about £170 million. At the General Assembly in September 2026, the foreign minister, Dhananjay Ramful, said that Mauritian sovereignty over the archipelago was "non-negotiable" and described the treaty as a vindication of international law.

== Litigation ==
Pompe's claim was joined with one by Louis Michel Mandarin and his son Misley Mandarin, who challenged the government's failure to consult Chagossians before agreeing to transfer sovereignty. On 10 March 2026 Mrs Justice Stacey refused permission for judicial review, holding that the claims were in substance a challenge to the prerogative of treaty-making and were not justiciable. She held that there was no duty to consult, since "the Chagossians have never had any right of abode or settlement on the Islands since their ancestors were first brought there".

In separate proceedings brought by Misley Mandarin and three others who had landed on Île du Coin in February 2026, the Chief Justice of the British Indian Ocean Territory quashed the 2004 constitutional provision denying a right of abode, and the removal notices served on them. Referring to Article 6 of the treaty, he found that "there is no defence or national security concerns anymore against repopulating the outer islands by Chagossians". The quashing orders were stayed pending an appeal, which was listed in the territory's Court of Appeal for 15–17 July 2026. The court heard the appeal on those dates and reserved judgment; on 4 November it gave notice that judgment would be handed down on 12 November 2026. See R (Mandarin) v Commissioner for the British Indian Ocean Territory.

Both Mauritius and the Maldives have threatened international litigation over the treaty. A Maldivian spokesman said in March 2026 that the British plans were not "adequately grounded in international legal principles", and Maldivian officials said that any challenge would most likely be brought at the ICJ.

== Reactions ==
=== United States ===
The treaty was negotiated with the involvement of the Biden and Trump administrations; the British government said it had been "tested thoroughly at all levels of the United States system under two Administrations". The State Department, Rubio and Hegseth welcomed the treaty on its signature (see above). Critics in the United States included Senator Jim Risch, who said the deal "gives in to Chinese lawfare and yields to pressure from unaccountable international institutions". Trump's later criticised the treaty in January 2026 and September 2026. The dispute over the use of Diego Garcia for strikes on Iran, which The Daily Telegraph reported had led Trump to withdraw his support, is described above.

=== India ===
India has long supported Mauritius's claim. It filed a written statement and took part in the hearings in the ICJ advisory proceedings, and voted for resolution 73/295 in 2019. In that debate its representative said that India shared "security concerns relating to the Indian Ocean", but that this was "a separate matter on which we urge the concerned Governments to reach a mutually agreeable understanding as soon as possible". The British announcement of negotiations in November 2022 said that India would be kept informed. On 3 October 2024 the Ministry of External Affairs welcomed the political agreement, saying: "This significant understanding completes the decolonisation of Mauritius." It added that India "has consistently supported Mauritius's claim for sovereignty over Chagos". It welcomed the signed treaty as "a milestone achievement" that marked "the culmination of the process of decolonisation of Mauritius". The British government listed India among the countries backing the agreement.

=== African Union ===
The Organisation of African Unity and the African Union have adopted resolutions on the Chagos Archipelago since 1980, which the General Assembly noted when it requested the advisory opinion. The African Union filed a written statement and written comments and took part in the hearings. On 3 October 2024 the chairperson of the African Union Commission, Moussa Faki Mahamat, applauded the political agreement, saying: "This significant milestone marks a major victory for the cause of Decolonization, International Law". He recalled the AU's "active support" to Mauritius "in its legal pursuit for the return of the Chagos Islands since 2018". On 23 May 2025 his successor, Mahmoud Ali Youssouf, said that the AU "warmly welcomes the announcement of the historic agreement", and described the accompanying strategic partnership as "a promising model of international cooperation grounded in respect for sovereignty".

=== Seychelles ===
The islands of Aldabra, Farquhar and Desroches were detached from the colony of Seychelles in 1965 in the same operation as the Chagos Archipelago, to form the British Indian Ocean Territory, and were returned to Seychelles on its independence. Seychelles filed a written statement and written comments in the ICJ proceedings and voted for resolution 73/295. In the 2019 debate its representative said that "the territory of the people of an independent nation cannot be excised without their consent", that "It stands to reason that the same precedent should be applied in the case of Mauritius", and that "Seychelles has a sizeable Chagossian community". According to Bancoult, the Seychelles Chagossians Community took part in discussions on the treaty and supported the implementing bill.

=== Other states ===
Canada, Australia, New Zealand and Japan also welcomed the deal. The British government said that "all Five Eyes partners" backed the agreement.

The Maldives objected. In 2026 its president, Mohamed Muizzu, said that the Maldives had a stronger historical and legal claim to the archipelago than Mauritius. In February 2026 Mauritius suspended diplomatic relations with the Maldives after the latter said that it no longer recognised Mauritian sovereignty over the archipelago and objected to the treaty.

=== United Nations bodies ===
In June 2025 several United Nations special rapporteurs and independent experts said that the treaty "appears to be at variance with the Chagossians' right to return" and called "for the ratification of the agreement to be suspended". The British government responded that their views were not binding. In December 2025 the Committee on the Elimination of Racial Discrimination, under its early-warning procedure, noted that the treaty was pending domestic ratification and called on both states "to suspend the ratification of the bilateral agreement". It objected that the treaty "explicitly prevents the return of the Chagossian people to their ancestral lands in Diego Garcia Island", and to the reported lack of consultation with Chagossians. According to a statement issued on their behalf, the procedure had been triggered on 26 May 2025, four days after the treaty was signed, by two Chagossian women born on Diego Garcia who opposed the treaty, Bertrice Pompe and Bernadette Dugasse. Mauritius told the committee in December 2025 that it deplored the decision, which it said caused "serious prejudice to the Republic of Mauritius as a sovereign state", and a British minister told the House of Lords in January 2026 that "The UK does not agree with the approach that the CERD has taken".

=== Chagossians ===
Chagossians were divided. The Chagos Refugees Group, led by Olivier Bancoult, supported the agreement because it allowed resettlement: "How could I oppose that even if it is not 100 percent satisfactory?" Bancoult called the signing "a historic day for us". In November 2025 Bancoult said that there was a consensus between the British and Mauritian governments and the Chagossian community, and that with the implementing bill return and compensation, for which the group had fought for years, became possible. He named three groups in Britain (the Chagos Islanders Movement, the UK Native Chagossian Council and the British branch of the CRG) and the Seychelles Chagossians Community as supporting the bill, and said that only three groups opposed it: Chagos Asylum People, Chagossian Voices and BIOT Citizens. In March 2026 he led Chagossian representatives received by the Mauritian inter-ministerial committee on the treaty and said that he was satisfied with the exchanges. In April 2026, announcing a delegation to Britain, he said that native Chagossians wanted a solution through the agreement, adding: "We are 100% agreed that this agreement must be supported" (translated). (Note: Translated from French: "Nous sommes 100% d'accord qu'il faut soutenir cet accord".) He said that the group remained "unshaken by Trump's interference in the Chagos deal", and that "International law is squarely on our side"; its members lobbied British political parties, except Reform UK, in London in June 2026.

Chagossian Voices, a British-based group, said it had not been consulted. One of its founders, Frankie Bontemps, said: "We feel voiceless, powerless". Claudette Lefade, leader of the group Chagos Asylum People, sought self-determination under the British flag and feared that Chagossians might fare worse under Mauritian administration. Pompe and Bernadette Dugasse, both born in the archipelago, said after the failed injunction that they would continue to oppose the agreement, and in June 2025 they complained to the UN Human Rights Committee that it breached the International Covenant on Civil and Political Rights. Peter Lamb, the MP for Crawley, where many Chagossians live, said that the principle of self-determination had been ignored.

In December 2025 a group of Chagossians in Britain declared a "government-in-exile" and elected Misley Mandarin as "first minister", saying that they wished to remain British (see Government of the Chagos Islands). In a statement on 18 December the Mauritian Attorney General, Gavin Glover, contested the legitimacy of the initiative, and the Mauritian government said that Chagossians were an integral part of the Mauritian people. On 16 February 2026 four Chagossians, accompanied by the former Conservative MP Adam Holloway, landed on an island in Peros Banhos to oppose the transfer. Mandarin said: "The UK is handing away my homeland to Mauritius". The Mauritian Minister of Justice, Gavin Glover, called the landing "clearly a publicity stunt" and said that Mauritius "has made a solemn commitment" to return Chagossians to their homeland. The settlement and the litigation that followed are described in Resettlement of Île du Coin. According to Al Jazeera, the Chagos Refugees Group is "at odds" with Mandarin and his supporters, who favour resettlement under British sovereignty and have received backing from Reform UK.

== Arguments for the agreement ==
=== Legal risk to the base ===
The British government's main argument was that the legal position of the base was under threat. At a press conference after the signing, Starmer said: "We had to act now… Because the base was under threat." He said that "The courts have already made decisions which undermine our position", and that if Mauritius went to court again the United Kingdom "would not have a realistic prospect of success" and "would likely face a Provisional Measures Order within a matter of weeks". The government's published legal position said that the ICJ's advisory opinion "carries significant weight" and was likely to be "highly influential" on any court or tribunal whose judgment would be binding, and that the ITLOS special chamber had inferred Mauritian sovereignty from it in 2021. Without a deal, it said, "it is highly likely that further wide-ranging litigation would be brought quickly by Mauritius", for example arbitration under Annex VII of the United Nations Convention on the Law of the Sea, and "A judgment from such a tribunal would be legally binding on the UK." The press release added: "The legal necessity of this deal has been recognised by successive governments." Healey told the Commons that "within weeks we could face losing legal rulings" and that "within just a few years the base would become inoperable".

The government argued that even if the United Kingdom ignored adverse rulings, other states and international organisations would act on them. Starmer gave the example of the electromagnetic spectrum, overseen by the International Telecommunication Union: if British control were put into doubt, "We would lose the first line of defence against other countries who wish to interfere and disrupt this capability". The Overseas Territories minister, Stephen Doughty, said that adverse rulings could make it harder to engage contractors and to obtain overflight clearances, and that the ITU would be required to apply a binding judgment that the United Kingdom was not sovereign, which would "have real-world impacts on the protection and security" of the base. The explanatory memorandum's examples of international bodies already acting on the dispute are given under Background, and the International Agreements Committee's view that the base would otherwise be "at greater risk" under Parliamentary scrutiny.

Others framed the agreement in terms of international law. The Liberal Democrats said that they backed "the UK acting in line with international law". According to CNN, "successive British governments have framed it as a test of the country's commitment to international law". After the bill lapsed, Frost wrote: "The UK is committing a serious and ongoing violation of international law by retaining sovereignty." Opponents rejected the legal case (see Legal necessity).

=== Security and operations ===
Ministers argued that the treaty protected the operation of the base. Healey said that without it rulings would leave the United Kingdom "unable to prevent hostile nations setting up installations around Diego Garcia, on the outer islands or carrying out joint exercises near the base", and that "anyone who would abandon this deal, would abandon this base". Starmer said that otherwise "We would not be able to prevent China… Or any other nation… Setting up their own bases on the outer islands". The government cited the buffer zone, joint decision-making on the outer islands and the ban on foreign security forces (see Defence and security), and Healey said that these provisions had not been in the draft negotiated by the previous government.

Healey described the base as supporting strike operations, submarine berthing, surveillance and nuclear test-ban monitoring, said that Diego Garcia was "one of just four locations in the world to operate ground station antennas for the Global Positioning System", and said that "two-thirds of global oil shipments" passed through the Indian Ocean. General Sir Jim Hockenhull, speaking alongside the Prime Minister, said: "I welcome the long term certainty that this treaty brings". The Foreign Secretary, David Lammy, said that "doing nothing was not an option".

=== International support ===
Supporters pointed to the backing of allies. The government said that "all Five Eyes partners" and India supported the agreement. Biden said in 2024 that it "secures the effective operation of the joint facility on Diego Garcia into the next century", and the Trump administration endorsed it at its signing (see Signature). India and the African Union presented it as completing the decolonisation of Mauritius (see India and African Union). Healey said that "Others want to see this base closed", naming China, Russia and Iran; Conservative MPs disputed this.

=== Chagossians and cost ===
Supporters cited the treaty's acknowledgement of "the wrongs of the past", Mauritius's freedom to resettle the outer islands, and the trust fund (see Chagossians and resettlement). The Chagos Refugees Group supported the treaty for these reasons (see Chagossians). On cost, Starmer argued that paying for the base was normal practice: "We pay for our other military bases. Allies like the US and France do the same." The government's figures, and the dispute over them, are set out under Cost.

== Criticism and controversy ==
=== Cost ===
The Conservatives argued that the "true cost" was £35 billion, the nominal total of the payments, and accused the government of an "accountancy trick". The figures come from calculations by the Government Actuary's Department, released under a freedom of information request, which give three totals over 99 years: £34.7 billion in cash terms, about £10 billion in 2025/26 prices, and £3.4 billion as a net present value discounted under the Treasury's social time preference rate. The government said the net present value was the appropriate measure, and that the cost was less than 0.2% of the annual defence budget. Badenoch said after the signing that the government was "paying upwards of £30 billion", and at Prime Minister's Questions on 21 January 2026 that it was "paying £35 billion".

Ministers rejected the nominal figure. Healey told the Commons on 22 May 2025 that there was "a long-established method" for accounting for long-term projects such as the base, nuclear decommissioning, infrastructure and pension liabilities. Starmer said at the signing: "Now there is obviously a cost to maintaining such a valuable asset", adding that "it will be less than cost of running one aircraft carrier for a year". In a written answer in November 2025 the defence minister Luke Pollard called the £35 billion figure "incorrect"; the Ministry of Defence later told Full Fact that the figure was accurate for the nominal cost but that it regarded £3.4 billion as the real cost. The Treasury told Full Fact that both figures were legitimate but that the lower one was more appropriate for a long-term deal.

Fact-checkers explained the difference between the figures. According to the PA news agency, the inflation-linked annual payment would rise to "around £800 million a year in the last few years of the deal", but "£800 million 95 years from now will not be worth the same as £800 million today"; in 2025/26 prices the £120 million payment would be worth £89.2 million by the fourteenth year. Full Fact noted that the discount rates used had been in use since 2003, including under the previous Conservative government, but also that the government had not applied the same method when describing other long-term spending, such as £22 billion on carbon capture. Ben Zaranko of the Institute for Fiscal Studies told Full Fact: "Neither is unambiguously right or wrong: it depends on the question at hand", adding that "for long-term agreements like this, some form of inflation adjustment and discounting is appropriate, and the Treasury figure is probably more useful for giving a sense of scale".

The UK Statistics Authority said that it was beyond its remit to judge the most appropriate discount rate, and that the Office for Budget Responsibility considered the rate reasonable for discounting a lease. It agreed with the Conservative MP James Cartlidge that, by describing £3.4 billion as the "net overall cost", the Prime Minister had not made clear "that the figure was calculated using a discounting method". An economist at the Institute for Fiscal Studies said that both figures were "technically correct" (see above). The Lords amendment requiring the government to publish the methodologies of the Government Actuary's Department, the Treasury and the Office for Budget Responsibility was rejected by the Commons by 347 votes to 185.

=== Legal necessity ===
The government argued that without the treaty Mauritius would seek a binding judgment, the Defence Secretary naming the International Tribunal for the Law of the Sea as "the most proximate" forum, and that other states and organisations would act on it to the detriment of the base. Badenoch called the agreement a "surrender" and said that no court had jurisdiction to make a binding judgment against the United Kingdom; Cartlidge described the fear of binding rulings as "overblown". A Policy Exchange report argued that the United Kingdom should not act on the basis of potential legal challenges. The International Agreements Committee heard that any international court considering the issue "would be unlikely to find in favour of the UK".

=== Security, China and Iran ===
Critics in the United States and the United Kingdom argued that Mauritius' relations with China could endanger the base. The Conservative Robert Jenrick called the deal "a strategic disaster for Britain". A representative of the Inter-Parliamentary Alliance on China said that China had "quite a clear record of using debt" to seek political advantage. Ramgoolam called such claims a "disinformation campaign" and said that "Mauritius is aligned with India, not China". He added that the Chinese government would not be allowed to take control of the islands. The British government said that the treaty included "robust provisions to keep adversaries out", and that without it legal proceedings could have rendered the base inoperable. Bancoult said of such concerns in 2024: "Knowing that there is a US military base there, I don't think Mauritius would be so stupid."

=== Opposition campaign ===
The Conservative Party opposed the agreement from its announcement. In January 2025 Badenoch called it a "dud deal", and the former home secretary Suella Braverman called it "uneconomical and frankly, foolish", saying that the "surrender of the Chagos Islands couldn't be a bigger disaster, frankly, for the US-UK relationship". After the signing Badenoch called the agreement a "surrender" (see Legal necessity), and in June 2025 Patel introduced a presentation bill to prohibit payments to another government in connection with the territory without parliamentary approval. Conservative peers proposed most of the Lords amendments described above.

Reform UK and the Great British PAC supported Chagossians in Britain who opposed the transfer. A poll organised by the Great British PAC chose Mandarin as "first minister" of the government-in-exile in December 2025, and in the Commons Reform's Richard Tice asked whether the government recognised it. The landing on Île du Coin in February 2026 (see Chagossians) was backed by the Great British PAC, which BBC News described as "a right-wing British political pressure group", and The Independent reported that it was funded by "Reform's biggest donor", Christopher Harborne. Coda Story described Harborne as "a mega-donor to Reform". The BIOT Supreme Court recorded media reports that Nigel Farage had flown to the Maldives intending to join the group's yacht, which did not happen. The Mauritian broadcaster Radio One, which described the Great British PAC as a far-right organisation, reported that it had launched an online fundraiser for a judicial review to stop the deal.

The Foreign Office called the landing an "illegal, unsafe stunt", and Glover called it a "publicity stunt organised to create a situation of conflict with the British government". Bancoult said that some Chagossians were letting themselves be used "as puppets" by British opposition politicians such as Farage and some Conservatives. (Note: Translated from French: "Il y a des Chagossiens qui se laissent être servis comme des marionnettes par des politiciens britanniques de l'opposition, comme Nigel Farage, et certains conservateurs.")

=== Proposals for a referendum ===
Several opponents of the treaty called for a referendum of Chagossians. In April 2025 Mandarin said that no agreement could be concluded without consulting the Chagossians and that a referendum was necessary, a call also made by Maxwell Evenor. In evidence to a Lords committee, Cleo Paskal argued that the question of sovereignty should have been put to Chagossians in a referendum. In the Commons in autumn 2025 a Liberal Democrat amendment, defeated by 319 votes to 83, would have required the government to negotiate with Mauritius on a right of return and "a referendum for Chagossians on self-determination". In December 2025 Mandarin wrote to Starmer and the Foreign Secretary, Yvette Cooper, asking for ratification to be suspended and for a referendum open to all Chagossians, with options including continued British status with wide autonomy or integration with Mauritius. The Lords amendment of January 2026 would have required a referendum of the Chagossian community on guaranteeing rights of resettlement, of work on Diego Garcia and of involvement in the trust fund; the Commons rejected it, and an amendment by Farage and others for a referendum on sovereignty was not selected because it would "impose a charge on public revenue". The Labour MP Graham Stringer, who voted for the Lords amendments, said: "It is to have a referendum." In April 2026 the Reform MP Danny Kruger asked the government to commit that the Chagossian community in the United Kingdom would be given a referendum on any future change to the islands' status.

Others argued that a referendum was not the relevant test. The International Agreements Committee recorded that the international lawyers Sir Christopher Greenwood and Philippe Sands "underlined, however, that as international law currently stands the Chagossians have no independent right to self-determination as distinct from the colonial unit of Mauritius and Chagos". In its advisory opinion the ICJ said that the right to self-determination "is defined by reference to the entirety of a non-self-governing territory", and that the United Kingdom was required "to respect the territorial integrity of that country, including the Chagos Archipelago". Bancoult questioned who would speak for the community, saying that most opponents of the bill had been born in Mauritius rather than on the islands. The High Court held in 2026 that there was no duty to consult the Chagossians before concluding the treaty (see Litigation).

=== Mauritius' claim ===
Some critics disputed that Mauritius had a historical claim to the archipelago. Maxwell Evenor of Chagossian Voices said that there was no historical link between the islands and Mauritius "because it's 2,000 kilometers away". Mauritius argues that it was unlawfully required to give up the archipelago as a condition of independence, a view supported by the ICJ's finding that the detachment "was not based on the free and genuine expression of the will of the people concerned".

== See also ==
- Chagos Archipelago sovereignty dispute
- Mauritius–United Kingdom relations
- Naval Support Facility Diego Garcia
- Resettlement of Île du Coin

== Sources ==
Treaty and official documents

- Prime Minister's Office (Mauritius) (12 December 2025). Highlights of Cabinet Meeting – Friday 12 December 2025 (PDF) (Report). Government of Mauritius.
- "PM meetings with world leaders at CHOGM" (Press release). Prime Minister's Office, 10 Downing Street. 5 November 2026.
- Agreement between the Government of the United Kingdom of Great Britain and Northern Ireland and the Government of the Republic of Mauritius concerning the Chagos Archipelago including Diego Garcia (CS Mauritius No.1/2025, CP 1334) (Report). Foreign, Commonwealth and Development Office. 22 May 2025.
- Healey, John (22 May 2025). Defence Secretary oral statement on Diego Garcia (Speech). House of Commons.
- Healey, John; Hockenhull, Jim (22 May 2025). Defence Secretary and General Hockenhull opening remarks (Speech). London.
- Starmer, Keir (22 May 2025). PM's remarks at press conference on Diego Garcia: 22 May 2025 (Speech). London.
- "UK and Mauritius joint statement, 3 October 2024" (Press release). Foreign, Commonwealth and Development Office. 3 October 2024.
- "UK-Mauritius joint statement on the Chagos Archipelago, 20 December 2024" (Press release). Foreign, Commonwealth and Development Office. 20 December 2024.
- "UK-Mauritius joint statement on the Chagos Archipelago, 13 January 2025" (Press release). Foreign, Commonwealth and Development Office. 13 January 2025.
- "Joint Communique: UK-Mauritius Strategic Partnership Framework" (Press release). Foreign, Commonwealth and Development Office. 22 May 2025.
- "Jonathan Powell appointed as Special Envoy for BIOT negotiations" (Press release). Foreign, Commonwealth and Development Office. 6 September 2024.
- "UK secures future of vital Diego Garcia Military Base to protect national security" (Press release). Ministry of Defence and Foreign, Commonwealth and Development Office. 22 May 2025.
- Permanent Mission of the United Kingdom to the United Nations (19 January 2023). Note No. 004/23 to the Secretary-General, with the Written Ministerial Statement of 3 November 2022 (PDF) (Report). United Nations.
- Biden, Joe (3 October 2024). "Statement on the Agreement Between Mauritius and the United Kingdom on the Status of the Chagos Archipelago". The American Presidency Project.
- "U.S. Support for UK and Mauritius Agreement On Chagos Archipelago" (Press release). United States Department of State. 22 May 2025 – via AllAfrica.
- "United States and Mauritius to Hold Bilateral Security Discussions" (Press release). United States Department of State. 17 February 2026. Archived from the original on 8 July 2026.
- Chote, Robert (4 July 2025). "Letter from Sir Robert Chote to James Cartlidge MP – Chagos Islands deal". UK Statistics Authority.
- Legal Consequences of the Separation of the Chagos Archipelago from Mauritius in 1965, Advisory Opinion (PDF). I.C.J. Reports 2019. International Court of Justice. 25 February 2019. p. 95.
- Dispute concerning delimitation of the maritime boundary between Mauritius and Maldives in the Indian Ocean (Mauritius/Maldives), Preliminary Objections, Judgment (PDF). ITLOS Reports 2020–2021. International Tribunal for the Law of the Sea. 28 January 2021. p. 17.
- United Nations General Assembly (24 May 2019). Resolution adopted by the General Assembly on 22 May 2019: 73/295. Advisory opinion of the International Court of Justice on the legal consequences of the separation of the Chagos Archipelago from Mauritius in 1965 (A/RES/73/295) (Report). United Nations.
- Committee on the Elimination of Racial Discrimination (2 December 2025). Decision 1 (2025): Mauritius and the United Kingdom (early warning and urgent action procedure, INT/CERD/EWU/11263), advance unedited version (Report). Office of the United Nations High Commissioner for Human Rights.
- United Nations General Assembly (22 May 2019). Official Records, Seventy-third session, 83rd plenary meeting, Wednesday, 22 May 2019, 10 a.m. (A/73/PV.83) (Report). United Nations.
- "Statement on Agreement between the United Kingdom and Mauritius regarding return of Mauritian sovereignty over Chagos Archipelago" (Press release). Ministry of External Affairs, Government of India. 3 October 2024 – via GlobalSecurity.org.
- "Chairperson of the AUC applauds historic Agreement between Mauritius & the United Kingdom recognising Mauritius sovereignty over Chagos Archipelago, including Diego Garcia" (Press release). African Union Commission. 3 October 2024.
- "Press Statement by H.E. Mahmoud Ali Youssouf, Chairperson of the African Union Commission on the Agreement Between the United Kingdom and the Republic of Mauritius on the Chagos Archipelago and the Establishment of a Strategic Partnership Framework" (Press release). African Union Commission. 23 May 2025.
- "Agreement between Mauritius and the UK fails to guarantee rights of Chagossians, say UN experts" (Press release). Office of the United Nations High Commissioner for Human Rights. 10 June 2025.

Parliamentary material

- Loft, Philip; Curtis, John (8 September 2025). 2025 treaty on the British Indian Ocean Territory/Chagos Archipelago (Report). Research Briefing CBP-10273. House of Commons Library.
- Brown, Thomas (30 October 2025). Diego Garcia Military Base and British Indian Ocean Territory Bill (HL Bill 139 of 2024–26) (Report). Library Briefing LLN-2025-0040. House of Lords Library.
- House of Lords International Agreements Committee (25 June 2025). UK-Mauritius Agreement on the Chagos Archipelago including Diego Garcia (PDF) (Report). 9th Report of Session 2024–26, HL Paper 146. House of Lords.
- "Diego Garcia Military Base and British Indian Ocean Territory Bill: Stages". UK Parliament.
- "British Sovereignty Protection (Chagos Islands) Bill [HL]: Stages". UK Parliament.
- "Diego Garcia Military Base and British Indian Ocean Territory Bill: Second Reading (Division 287)". UK Parliament. 9 September 2025.
- "Diego Garcia Military Base and British Indian Ocean Territory Bill: Third Reading (Division 318)". UK Parliament. 20 October 2025.
- Diego Garcia Military Base and British Indian Ocean Territory Bill: Lords Amendments (Bill 364) (PDF) (Report). House of Commons. 13 January 2026.
- Lords Amendments: Diego Garcia Military Base and British Indian Ocean Territory Bill (Decisions on Motions relating to Lords Amendments) (PDF) (Report). House of Commons. 20 January 2026.
- "Diego Garcia Military Base". Hansard, House of Commons. 22 May 2025.
- "Diego Garcia Military Base and British Indian Ocean Territory Bill (Second Reading)". Hansard, House of Commons. 9 September 2025.
- "Chagossians: Trust Fund and Resettlement". Hansard, House of Commons. 16 December 2025.
- "Diego Garcia and British Indian Ocean Territory". Hansard, House of Commons. 25 February 2026.
- "Diego Garcia Military Base and British Indian Ocean Territory Bill". Hansard, House of Commons. 13 April 2026.
- "King's Speech". Hansard, House of Lords. 18 May 2026.
- "UK-Mauritius Chagos Treaty: Future Spending". Hansard, House of Commons. 1 September 2026.
- "International Update". Hansard, House of Commons. 12 October 2026.
- "Diego Garcia Military Base and British Indian Ocean Territory Bill". Hansard, House of Lords. 13 October 2026.
- "Topical Questions". Hansard, House of Commons. 27 October 2026.
- "British Sovereignty Protection (Chagos Islands) Bill [HL]". Hansard, House of Lords. 23 October 2026.
- "Diego Garcia Military Base and British Indian Ocean Territory Bill". Hansard, House of Lords. 5 January 2026.

Court decisions

- R (Pompe) v Secretary of State for Foreign, Commonwealth and Development Affairs; R (Mandarin) v Secretary of State for Foreign, Commonwealth and Development Affairs, EWHC (Admin) 529 (High Court 10 March 2026).
- R (Mandarin and others) v HM Commissioner for the British Indian Ocean Territory (Supreme Court of the British Indian Ocean Territory 31 March 2026), Text.
- R (Mandarin and others) v HM Commissioner for the British Indian Ocean Territory: Order (Supreme Court of the British Indian Ocean Territory 31 March 2026), Text.
- "Cause list, 15–17 July 2026: HM Commissioner for the British Indian Ocean Territory v The King (on the application of Mandarin & Ors), [2026] BIOT CA (Civ) 1" (PDF). British Indian Ocean Territory Court of Appeal. 2026.
- "Notice of judgment hand down: His Majesty's Commissioner for the British Indian Ocean Territory v The King (on the application of Mandarin & Ors), [2026] BIOT CA (Civ) 1" (PDF). British Indian Ocean Territory Court of Appeal. 4 November 2026.

News reports and analysis

- AFP (18 February 2026). "Chagos islanders say they refuse to leave in protest against UK handover". Arab News.
- "India welcomes UK-Mauritius treaty on Chagos". Akashvani News. All India Radio. 23 May 2025.
- Arjanee, Ameerah (2 October 2026). "UK-Mauritius Chagos sovereignty deal stalls amid fears of further delays". Al Jazeera English.
- Kunda, James (28 February 2026). "Mauritius suspends diplomatic ties with Maldives". Anadolu Agency.
- Badshah, Nadeem (17 February 2026). "Four Chagossians return to islands in attempt to stop British transfer to Mauritius". The Guardian.
- "Deportation of Chagos Islanders blocked by judge". BBC News. 19 February 2026.
- Bir, Burak (24 January 2026). "UK delays debate on Chagos deal after Trump backlash: Reports". Anadolu Agency.
- Brams, Sophie (21 February 2026). "Pentagon blocked from using UK bases in potential Iran strike". The Hill.
- "Dossier Chagos : tête-à-tête entre Navin Ramgoolam et son homologue britannique, Andy Burnham" [Chagos file: one-to-one meeting between Navin Ramgoolam and his British counterpart, Andy Burnham]. Le Défi Media (in French). 5 November 2026.
- Diver, Tony (5 June 2025). "Starmer's Chagos deal reported to UN human rights chiefs". The Daily Telegraph.
- Frost, Tom (13 April 2026). "Chagos Islands deal shelved – legal expert explains what happens next". The Conversation.
- "Government delays Chagos deal after opposition from Trump and Tories". ITV News. 23 January 2026 – via Yahoo News.
- Hughes, David; Payne, Josh (27 February 2025). "President Trump 'inclined to go along with' PM's Chagos Islands deal". Express & Star. PA Media.
- "Ile Maurice: «Qui sont les plus légitimes ? Les déracinés ou les troisièmes générations nées au pays ?»". L'Express (in French). 8 November 2025 – via allAfrica.
- "Ile Maurice: Bancoult veut faire entendre «la vraie voix» de la communauté à Londres". L'Express (in French). 28 April 2026 – via allAfrica.
- "Chagos deal : Olivier Bancoult satisfait des échanges, les représentants des chagossiens consultés". L'Express (in French). 3 March 2026.
- "Ile Maurice: Port-Louis rejette toute remise en question de sa souveraineté". L'Express (in French). 9 June 2026 – via allAfrica.
- "Ile Maurice: Navin Ramgoolam et Andy Burnham visent une feuille de route d'ici décembre" [Mauritius: Navin Ramgoolam and Andy Burnham aim for a roadmap by December]. L'Express (in French). 5 November 2026 – via allAfrica.
- "Chagos : la décision de la Cour d'appel britannique mise en délibéré". Outre-mer La 1ère (in French). France Télévisions. 21 July 2026.
- Lateef, Samaan (21 January 2025). "Mauritius PM calls for closer ties with China, but insists he won't let Beijing take Chagos Islands". The Daily Telegraph.
- Lateef, Samaan (5 March 2026). "Mauritius to sue Britain over Chagos delay". The Daily Telegraph – via Yahoo News.
- Lawless, Jill (20 January 2026). "Trump slams UK deal to hand over Chagos Islands after he previously supported it". PBS News Hour. Associated Press.
- "'Surrender' of Chagos Islands to Mauritius would be 'disaster' for Labour's relationship with Trump, Braverman says". LBC. 19 January 2025.
- Lendon, Brad (20 February 2026). "Diego Garcia: Britain blocking use of air bases Trump says would be needed for strikes on Iran, UK media report". CNN.
- Limbeea Ragaven, Jessila (19 February 2026). "Chagos : L'extrême droite britannique apporte son soutien à Mandarin". Radio One (in French).
- Lynch, David (5 November 2026). "Andy Burnham wants progress on Chagos Islands stalemate 'by the end of the year'". Express & Star. PA Media.
- Maddox, David (25 February 2026). "Was this the week Starmer's Chagos deal finally died?". The Independent.
- Maddox, David; Mitchell, Archie (11 June 2025). "United Nations experts call for Starmer's Chagos deal to be suspended". The Independent.
- Mallinder, Lorraine (11 February 2025). "'Tug of war': Chagos Islands deal tearing families apart in Mauritius". Al Jazeera English.
- Martin, Daniel (16 December 2025). "Chagos Islanders defy Starmer by forming government in exile". The Telegraph. Archived from the original on 17 December 2025.
- Mallinder, Lorraine (10 March 2026). "The Belongers: What the Chagos Islands tells us about the new world order". Coda Story.
- Nuckchhed, Vashish (25 December 2025). "Chagos : «Il serait injuste de répéter l'erreur de 1965», plaide Misley Mandarin". L'Express (in French).
- Ormiston, Simon (23 September 2026). "UK to review Chagos deal after Trump tells Burnham it is 'terrible'". Euronews.
- Ozkan, Mevlut (8 December 2025). "UN committee urges UK, Mauritius to respect Chagossians' right to return to Diego Garcia Island". Anadolu Agency.
- Ouitona, Maceo (19 December 2025). "Chagos : Port-Louis face à la fronde du « gouvernement en exil »". Afrik.com (in French).
- "Fact check: Government calculations set out three cost estimates for Chagos deal". Rutland Times. PA Media. 23 January 2026.
- Piper, Elizabeth (21 September 2026). "British PM Andy Burnham seeks resolution to dispute over Diego Garcia base". Reuters.
- Piper, Elizabeth; MacAskill, Andrew (15 January 2025). "Britain gives Trump team chance to review Chagos Islands deal". Reuters – via Yahoo News.
- "UK court lifts injunction, allowing Chagos Islands deal to proceed". Arab News. Reuters. 22 May 2025.
- Ridgwell, Henry (10 March 2025). "British plan to cede Chagos Islands sovereignty prompts concerns over China threat". Voice of America.
- Ronald, Issy (11 April 2026). "UK forced to halt Chagos Islands deal after Trump criticism". CNN.
- "Chagossian activists challenge legality of new bilateral agreement". Seychelles Nation. 10 June 2025.
- Stacey, Kiran (5 November 2026). "Burnham wants to 'recast' Chagos Islands deal after US resistance". The Guardian.
- Stringer, Connor (2 March 2026). "Exclusive: Trump – I'm 'very disappointed' in Starmer over Iran". The Daily Telegraph – via Yahoo News.
- Sundarji, Padma Rao (10 October 2024). "Thank you India – and Mahatma: For Chagos Island refugees, a long battle and a note of gratitude". Scroll.in.
- Thomas, Fernando (3 April 2025). "Accord sur les Chagos : Londres réaffirme son engagement, mais la diaspora reste divisée". Le Défi Media (in French).
- Thomas, Pramod (11 October 2026). "Mauritius threatens legal action against UK over stalled Chagos Islands deal". Eastern Eye.
- Thompson, George; James, Rhiannon (20 January 2026). "Labour MPs rebel over Chagos Islands deal following Trump criticism". The Independent – via Yahoo News.
- Thompson, Tony; Smith, Hannah (6 February 2026). "How much is the UK spending on the Chagos deal?". Full Fact.
