= Pelkey =

Pelkey is a surname. Notable people with the surname include:

- Amanda Pelkey (born 1993), American ice hockey forward
- Arthur Pelkey (1884–1921), Canadian boxer
- Charles Pelkey (born 1958), American politician
- Michael Pelkey (born 1940), American skydiver
- Robin Pelkey (1963–1983), American murder victim

== See also ==
- Dan's City Used Cars, Inc. v. Pelkey, 2013 United States Supreme Court case
- Pelkey Lake, in Minnesota
