= Saleh v. Bush =

US legal case

- Court: United States Court of Appeals for the Ninth Circuit
- Full case name: Sundus Shaker Saleh v. George W. Bush; Richard B. Cheney; Donald Rumsfeld; Condoleezza Rice; Colin Powell; Paul Wolfowitz; Does 1-10
- Decided: February 10, 2017
- Citation: 848 F.3d 880

Case history
- Prior history: Dismissed, No. 3:13-cv-01124 (N.D. Cal. Dec. 19, 2014)

Court membership
- Judges sitting: Susan P. Graber, Andrew D. Hurwitz, Richard F. Boulware

Case opinions
- Majority: Graber, joined by unanimous

Saleh v. Bush, 848 F.3d 880 (9th Cir. 2017), was a class action lawsuit filed in 2013 against high-ranking members of the George W. Bush administration (including George W. Bush, Dick Cheney, Donald Rumsfeld, Condi Rice, Colin Powell, and Paul Wolfowitz) for their alleged involvement in premeditating and carrying out the Iraq War. In December 2014, the district court hearing the case ordered it dismissed with prejudice. The dismissal was affirmed by the United States Court of Appeal for the Ninth Circuit.

== Proceedings in district court and dismissal ==
The lawsuit was filed in the United States District Court for the Northern District of California by lawyer Inder Comar, and the lead plaintiff is Sundus Shaker Saleh, an Iraqi expatriate. Plaintiffs alleged that the defendants conspired to wage a war of aggression against the Iraqi people, a violation of the Nuremberg Principles. Plaintiffs specially claimed the primary purpose of the Iraq War was to enact regime change in Iraq, as distinct from national self defense. In pursuit of this goal, the defendants are alleged to have: planned the war as early as 1998; capitalized on the September 11 attacks in 2001 to ramp up support for the invasion; utilized fear tactics and intentional misinformation; entered Iraq without fully proper UN Security Council authorization. (Note: Complaint for Conspiracy to Commit Aggression; and the Crime of Aggression, Saleh v. Bush, U.S.D.C., Northern District of California, March 13, 2013) The United States Department of Justice (DOJ) represented the defendants, who are all former government officials.

The government moved to dismiss the suit, and in December 2014, the U.S. District Court for the Northern District of California dismissed the suit with prejudice. The court substituted the United States as the sole defendant in place of the individual government officials, citing the Westfall Act, which provides that "the exclusive remedy for torts committed by Government employees in the scope of their employment" in an action against the government itself under the Federal Tort Claims Act.

The court noted that the Attorney General had formally certified that the individual defendants "were acting within the scope of their federal employment when performing the acts at issue." The court then dismissed the lawsuit because the plaintiffs had failed to exhaust administrative remedies as required under the FTCA for claims against the government, a jurisdictional requirement.

== Appeal ==
Plaintiffs filed an appeal in the U.S. Court of Appeals for the Ninth Circuit. A group of international lawyers (including former U.S. Attorney General Ramsey Clark) filed an amicus brief in support of the plaintiffs. (Note: Jamail, Dahr, "Former US Attorney General Files Brief in Lawsuit Challenging Legality of Iraq War", Truthout, 15 June 2015.)

On July 22, 2016, the plaintiffs filed a motion for judicial notice, submitting excerpts from the Chilcot Report in support of their claims.

Oral argument was held on December 12, 2016, before Judges Susan Graber, Andrew Hurwitz, and Richard Boulware, heard thirty minutes of oral arguments on December 12, 2016.

On February 10, 2017, the Ninth Circuit unanimously affirmed the judgment in an opinion by Judge Graber.
