= Aurélie Marie-Lisette Talate =

Chagossian activist

Aurélie Marie-Lisette Talate, also known as Lisette Talate or Aurelie Talate in her community (19 March 1941 – 4 January 2012) was a Chagossian activist and emblematic figure of the Chagossian struggle to regain their islands; which they were forcibly exiled from by the UK in order to establish the Diego Garcia military base.

== Biography ==
Born on Diego Garcia, Lisette Talate was married when she was around sixteen or seventeen years old, and had six children who were all born on Diego Garcia, four of whom survived her. At the time of her death, she had thirteen grandchildren and seven great-grandchildren. Her parents, grandparents and her great-grandmother were all born on the Chagos Archipelago. Lisette was often described as a small, frail woman, who often appeared timid and did not know how to read or write, yet whose character was that of a "Woman of Fire."

In her memoirs recorded by journalist John Pilger and the newspaper ‘Le Mauricien’ (The Mauritian), she recounts the circumstances which led to her forced exile. She explains that the inhabitants of the Chagos archipelago were, to begin with, not greatly concerned by the presence of British and American people on Diego Garcia; but rumours began to surface of a possible war on the horizon. Slowly but surely, boats began to take people away from the islands, who would then never come back - and the Chagossian people began to ask questions among themselves. Lisette Talate then left on a boat called Perle II with her family to visit a neighbouring island, Peros Banhos, where her mother was born. There, she witnessed soldiers capturing pet dogs and burning them alive. At the same time, the shops were no longer able to replenish their supplies.

In 1973, Lisette Talate and her family - her children, her two sisters and her mother, were finally forced onto a cargo ship called Norvder, headed towards Port-Louis, the capital of Mauritius. There, they had no choice but to live in a slum.

One of the consequences of their forced expulsion was the death of two of her sons: Jollice, at the age of 8 years old, and Régis, at ten months old. The reason Lisette gave for their death has often been repeated by journalists and supporters of the Chagossian people to illustrate their struggle: “They died of sagren (sadness). Jollice saw the horror of the fate of the pet dogs. The doctor said that there is no cure for sadness." In a Huffington Post article, historian David Vine used the concept of the Chagossian people dying of ‘sagren’ or ‘sadness’ in a tribute article.

Soon after their exile, Lisette and other Chagossian women, in particular her sister-in-law Charlesia Alexis, and Rita Élysée Bancoult, joined together to defend their rights. They organised demonstrations and hunger strikes, most notably in 1975, 1978, 1980 and 1981. They chose to campaign predominantly as women only, because they recognised that men were much more likely to be targeted by law enforcement. Their struggle drew support from many important and influential people such as Paul Bérenger and Kader Bhayat, both politicians from the MMM party led which was a left-wing socialist political party in Mauritius; but also from female activists such as Lindsey Collen, a Mauritian novelist and activist. Lisette was temporarily imprisoned in Rose-Hill, where she began another hunger strike.

In 1982, the British government permitted negotiations and proposed compensation to the Chagossian refugees, who collectively received four million pounds from the UK government, and land to the value of one million pounds from the Mauritian government. Many Chagossian people were illiterate. To receive their compensation, they had to sign a document in which they renounced their right to return to Diego Garcia.

Charlesia Alexis, Lisette Talate and Olivier Bancoult, the son of Rita Élysée Bancoult, founded the Chagos Refugee Group (CRG) to defend their cause in the pursuit of justice. Their case went before British courts before arriving at the European Court of Human Rights, and they received the support of many important figures such as previous British High Commissioner to Mauritius David Snoxell, and the historical novelist Philippa Gregory.

In 2003, Lisette Talate testified in créole before the High Court of Justice in London, to contest the annulment by royal decree of a judgment made in favour of the Chagossian people. Her memories, which were not all precise, led the judge to decide that she could not be considered as a reliable witness, -but she nevertheless made a strong impression. According to a number of Mauritian newspapers, her name was proposed by 'l’Association Mille Femmes’ (The Association of a Thousand Women) to feature among the list of women who would be awarded the Nobel Peace Prize in 2015. The same year, she was permitted to briefly visit the island of her birth, more than thirty years after her forced expulsion.

=== Death ===
In 2012, following complications with high blood pressure, Lisette Talate was admitted to the Jeetoo hospital in Port-Louis, Mauritius. She died there on January 4th, after ten days in hospital. Her funeral took place on 6 January, with Maurice Piat, the Bishop of Port-Louis. Many well-known figures such as government ministers, deputies and Cassam Uteem, the longest serving President of Mauritius, were there to pay their respects.

== Personal life ==
Lisette's daughter Eileen has reportedly followed in her activist footsteps.

== Recognition ==
In 2011, then Prime Minister of Mauritius, Navin Ramgoolam, named her a Member of the Order of the Star and the Key of the Indian Ocean, and awarded her the Mauritian Order of Merit which is given to those citizens who have contributed towards the progress of the nation.

In 2013, the city of Port-Louis posthumously gave her the distinction of ‘Citoyenne d’Honneur’ (Citizen of Honour).

In 2015, she was one of two women to whom the Ministry of Gender Equality, of Child Development and of Family Well-being in Mauritius gave an official tribute on International Women's Day.

A community centre in Pointe-aux-Sables, Mauritius, was named after her along with the public swimming pool at Saint-Paul à La Réunion.
