= Bancoult v. McNamara =

2006 U.S. appeals court ruling on the Chagossians' claims

- Court: United States Court of Appeals for the District of Columbia Circuit
- Full case name: Olivier Bancoult, et al. v. Robert S. McNamara, et al.
- Argued: February 16, 2006
- Decided: April 21, 2006
- Citation: 445 F.3d 427

Case history
- Prior history: 227 F. Supp. 2d 144 (D.D.C. 2002); dismissed, 370 F. Supp. 2d 1 (D.D.C. 2004)
- Subsequent history: Rehearing denied, July 11, 2006; cert. denied, 549 U.S. 1166 (2007)

Holding
- The Chagossians' claims against the United States and the individual officials, including those about the manner in which the islands were depopulated, present nonjusticiable political questions. Dismissal affirmed.

Court membership
- Judges sitting: David S. Tatel, Janice Rogers Brown, Thomas B. Griffith

Case opinions
- Majority: Brown, joined by unanimous

Laws applied
- Political question doctrine; Alien Tort Statute; Federal Tort Claims Act; Westfall Act

Bancoult v. McNamara, 445 F.3d 427 (D.C. Cir. 2006), was a lawsuit brought in the United States by Chagossians, the former inhabitants of the Chagos Archipelago, over their removal from the islands so that the United States could build a military base on Diego Garcia in the British Indian Ocean Territory. Olivier Bancoult, two other Chagossians and two Chagossian associations sued the United States and several current and former senior officials of the Departments of Defense and State, the first named being Robert S. McNamara, seeking damages and declaratory and injunctive relief.

The United States District Court for the District of Columbia dismissed the suit in December 2004. On April 21, 2006, the Court of Appeals for the D.C. Circuit affirmed, holding that all the claims presented nonjusticiable political questions. In an opinion by Judge Janice Rogers Brown, the court held that the way the islands were depopulated could not be separated from the unreviewable decision to build the base, describing the policy and its implementation as "a sort of Möbius strip". The Supreme Court denied certiorari on January 16, 2007.

== Background ==
The D.C. Circuit opened its opinion with Winston Churchill's 1946 speech at Westminster College, in which he called for military cooperation between Britain and the United States, including the "joint use of ... Naval and Air Force bases"; the court described the construction of the United States Navy Support Facility on Diego Garcia as one instance in which that call was heeded. The Chagos Archipelago, including Diego Garcia, had been under British control since 1814. According to the government, the archipelago was detached from the colony of Mauritius in 1965 to form the British Indian Ocean Territory, and in 1966 an exchange of notes between the two governments set it aside for their defense needs "for an indefinitely long period". In 1975 Congress made funding for the base's expansion conditional on a presidential certification that it was "essential to the national interest of the United States", which President Gerald Ford gave on May 12, 1975; Congress also held hearings on the fate of the former inhabitants.

The removal was also litigated in England. In 2000 the High Court struck down the immigration ordinance that had kept the Chagossians from returning, and in 2004 two Orders in Council restored "full immigration control over all the islands". (Note: See R v Secretary of State for Foreign and Commonwealth Affairs, ex p Bancoult (No 1) and R v Secretary of State for Foreign and Commonwealth Affairs, ex parte Bancoult (No 2).) By the time the United States government opposed certiorari, the High Court had ruled for the Chagossians again in May 2006, and the British government's appeal was pending.

== The claims ==
The appellants were Olivier Bancoult, Jeanette Therese Alexis and Marie Isabelle France-Charlot, who claimed to be indigenous people of Chagos and direct descendants of indigenous Chagossians, and two non-profit associations working "to further the welfare of the Chagossians": the Chagos Refugee Group and the Chagos Social Committee. They alleged that the British and American governments began secret negotiations in 1964 about a military base in the Indian Ocean, chose Diego Garcia after an "Anglo-American survey", and decided to depopulate the whole archipelago, portraying its inhabitants as seasonal contract workers from Mauritius and Seychelles rather than permanent residents.

As the appellants described it, the depopulation took place in three stages. From 1965 Chagossians who traveled outside the archipelago were not allowed to return; the United States then allegedly placed an embargo on the islands to stop food supplies and "starve the inhabitants out of the islands"; and finally the remaining inhabitants of Diego Garcia were forced onto ships and taken to other islands of the archipelago, whose entire population was removed two years later. Alexis alleged that residents were threatened with death if they did not leave, that the cats and dogs on Diego Garcia were killed, and that the Chagossians were not fed during a six-day sea voyage.

The appellants contended that the Chagossians were left in Mauritius and Seychelles without housing, employment or other help, that they lived "in abject poverty in a foreign land", and that their property on Diego Garcia was destroyed when the base was built. They also claimed that the United States had discriminated against them in hiring at the base, employing workers from Mauritius, Seychelles, Sri Lanka and the Philippines but refusing to hire Chagossians, apart from a few who concealed their origins.

== District court ==
The suit was filed against the United States on December 20, 2001, on behalf of the plaintiffs and all similarly situated Chagossians, seeking compensatory and punitive damages and declaratory and injunctive relief. Several current and former senior officials of the Departments of Defense and State were named as defendants under the Alien Tort Statute, on the basis that they knew or should have known of the decisions to depopulate the islands and build the base, and had direct authority over those who carried them out. The claims included forced relocation; torture; racial discrimination; cruel, inhuman or degrading treatment; genocide; intentional infliction of emotional distress; negligence; trespass; and destruction of real and personal property. Three corporate defendants, Halliburton, Brown & Root and De Chazal Du Mee, were also sued, but were dismissed from the case and were not part of the appeal. The case was assigned to Judge Ricardo M. Urbina.

On December 21, 2004, the court granted the motions to dismiss filed by the United States and the individual defendants. Under the Westfall Act, if the Attorney General certifies that a federal employee was "acting within the scope of his office or employment" at the time of an incident, the claims arising from it become claims against the United States under the Federal Tort Claims Act (FTCA). The Attorney General gave that certification; the court found that the Chagossians had not rebutted it or shown that an exception applied, and substituted the United States for the individual defendants. According to the Harvard Law Review, the court reasoned that the officials' conduct was a "direct outgrowth" of their national security duties. The court then dismissed the FTCA claims because the plaintiffs had not exhausted their administrative remedies and because the FTCA does not cover injuries suffered in a foreign country.

The remaining claims against the United States were dismissed for lack of subject-matter jurisdiction under the political question doctrine. Applying the six factors of Baker v. Carr, the district court found all of them present: the military and foreign policy conduct at issue was the exclusive province of the political branches; there were no adequate standards to judge it; the court could not determine the "national defense needs of the U.S. military in the Indian Ocean"; deciding the claims would show a lack of respect for Congress and the executive; there was a need for unquestioning adherence to the decision to build the base; and disturbing the government's "single voice" risked embarrassment. The court denied the request for a preliminary injunction as moot.

== Court of Appeals ==
The appeal was argued on February 16, 2006, before Circuit Judges David S. Tatel, Brown and Thomas B. Griffith. The appellants were represented by student counsel, with Michael E. Tigar on the brief, and the appellees by lawyers of the United States Department of Justice. Judge Brown wrote the opinion of the court, decided on April 21, 2006; there was no separate opinion. She began by noting that the case involved "serious allegations involving events occurring forty years ago on the far side of the world".

=== Jurisdiction first ===
The court said that it had to decide jurisdictional questions before the merits, and treated the political question doctrine as one aspect of the limits that Article III of the Constitution places on the federal courts. Because it found that issue decisive, it did not reach "any other jurisdictional issues, such as sovereign immunity, nor the merits of Appellants' claims".

=== The political question framework ===
The court set out the six Baker v. Carr factors and noted that only one needs to be present for a case to be nonjusticiable. It said that the case involved "the quintessential sources of political questions: national security and foreign relations". It relied heavily on its decision a year earlier in Schneider v. Kissinger, a suit against the United States and the former National Security Advisor Henry Kissinger over the alleged kidnapping, torture and death of the Chilean general René Schneider, whom the plaintiffs alleged had been "neutralized" to allow a coup to succeed. Summarizing Schneider, the court recalled that it had found no manageable standards there, because it could not "recast[] foreign policy and national security questions in tort terms".

The court accepted that "[n]ot every political case presents a political question", and that cases with only an indirect effect on foreign affairs, or claims under the Takings and Due Process Clauses of the Fifth Amendment, could be justiciable. It added, however, that generally "attacks on foreign policymaking are nonjusticiable".

=== The decision to build the base ===
The appellants conceded, and the court agreed, that the decision to establish a military base on Diego Garcia was not reviewable. The court said that the decision "was an exercise of the foreign policy and national security powers entrusted by the Constitution to the political branches of our government", and could not be re-examined without making a "policy determination of a kind clearly for nonjudicial discretion". It agreed with the district court that there were no standards by which a court could weigh considerations such as the containment of the Soviet Union in the Indian Ocean.

=== The manner of depopulation ===
The appellants argued that, "[w]hile the Executive made a political decision to secure the Chagos Islands, the Chagossians were subjected to egregious and illegal conduct during the depopulation process", and that the way the policy was carried out could be reviewed separately from the policy itself. At oral argument they sought to distinguish Schneider, saying that the claims there may have been inseparable from the policy of encouraging a coup in Chile, whereas theirs could be separated from the decision to build the base.

The court rejected the distinction. It held that the tactical measures allegedly used to depopulate the archipelago and build the base were "as inextricably intertwined with the underlying strategy of establishing a regional military presence" as the alleged "neutralization" of General Schneider had been with the policy of undermining Allende's government. It continued:

In each case, the policy and its implementation constitute a sort of Möbius strip that we cannot sever without impermissibly impugning past policy and promising future remedies that will remain beyond our ken.

The court said that it could not "second-guess the degree to which the executive was willing to burden itself by protecting the Chagossians' well-being while pursuing the foreign policy goals of the United States". In its view the steps taken to establish the base "did not merely touch on foreign policy, but rather constituted foreign policy decisions themselves". If it were to hold that the executive owed the Chagossians a duty of care, or that the depopulation had to meet some minimum level of protection, "we would be meddling in foreign affairs beyond our institutional competence". In a footnote, the court added that although the case did not involve battlefield decisions, "the tactical and logistical details of establishing an overseas base are as much a matter of executive discretion as are strategic decisions".

Finally, the court noted that constitutionally protected liberties could require it to consider limits on the political branches' foreign policy and national security powers, but that "no such constitutional claims are at issue in this case".

=== The individual defendants ===
The court held that the same considerations barred the claims against the individual officials. Without deciding the Westfall Act question, which it did not reach, it applied general principles of agency law to reject the argument that the officials had acted outside the scope of their employment and so fell outside the political question doctrine. Assuming the allegations to be true, the officials had been authorized to depopulate the archipelago and establish the base, and all the acts alleged either furthered that goal or were incidental to it. Where the authorized task included removing an entire community from its islands, "the use of harsh measures in the course of completing the tasks cannot be unexpected".

The court stressed that this did not create "some new form of immunity for executive officers"; it held only that "when the political question doctrine bars suit against the United States, this constitutional constraint cannot be circumvented merely by bringing claims against the individuals who committed the acts in question within the scope of their employment". It concluded that all the claims presented nonjusticiable political questions, and affirmed the judgment of the district court.

== Rehearing and certiorari ==
According to the government, the appellants then petitioned for rehearing, arguing for the first time that principles of comity required the American courts to defer to the English courts' judgments on their right to return; the petition was denied on July 11, 2006, with no judge voting to grant it.

The Chagossians filed a petition for a writ of certiorari in the Supreme Court on October 9, 2006 (No. 06-502), with Michael Tigar as their counsel. According to the government's brief, the petition argued that the D.C. Circuit's case law "confuses discretionary political question justiciability with a lack of federal jurisdiction under Article III", that the court had treated all claims as nonjusticiable whenever the general subject matter was political, that the decision disregarded Sosa v. Alvarez-Machain, that tort claims are governed by standards that courts are able to apply, and that comity required a remand in the light of the English High Court's judgment.

The Solicitor General, Paul D. Clement, filed a brief in opposition on December 13, 2006. The government framed the first question as whether a suit challenging "the Executive Branch's negotiation and implementation of a formal agreement with the British Government during the Cold War to establish a military base on a British territory in the Indian Ocean" presented a nonjusticiable political question, and the second as whether the suit was time-barred or had other threshold defects. It argued that the unanimous decision was correct and did not conflict with that of any other court, noting that the Supreme Court had recently denied certiorari in Schneider. In the government's view the executive had decided that national security required the agreement with Britain and the base, Congress had held hearings on the treatment of the inhabitants and then funded the base, and "[t]he courts may not now review those decisions through the prism of tort law". The brief also argued that the United States could not itself give the Chagossians access to the islands, which remained under British sovereignty.

The government further contended that the comity argument had been raised too late, and that comity could not overcome constitutional limits on judicial review in any event. In the alternative, it argued that the claims would fail anyway: the Westfall Act substitution and the FTCA's foreign-country exception barred the tort claims, no waiver of sovereign immunity allowed the Alien Tort Statute and international law claims against the United States, and the claims were time-barred, having been filed in 2001 for events between 1965 and 1973.

The petitioners filed a reply on January 4, 2007, and the petition was distributed for the conference of January 12, 2007. The Supreme Court denied certiorari on January 16, 2007, without recorded dissent.

== Reception ==
An unsigned "Recent Case" note in the Harvard Law Review in January 2007 said that the outcome was "defensible as a relatively easy application of Baker v. Carr", and that, as a matter of precedent, the D.C. Circuit had correctly applied the Baker factors. The note welcomed the court's acknowledgment that individual rights claims may limit the political question doctrine in foreign affairs cases. It criticized, however, the court's remark about "constitutionally-protected liberties", which it read as suggesting "a legally dubious distinction between constitutional and statutory rights". The note gave three objections to that distinction: decisions of other circuits contradicted it; no Supreme Court precedent directly supported it; and, if a court declined to enforce a right conferred by Congress, it would turn the separation-of-powers logic of the doctrine "on its head". The note argued that the distinction, unnecessary to decide Bancoult itself, could matter in cases arising from the war on terror, where it might hinder Congress's ability to check the executive.

== See also ==
- Detachment of the Chagos Archipelago
- Chagos Archipelago sovereignty dispute
- R v Secretary of State for Foreign and Commonwealth Affairs, ex p Bancoult (No 1)
- R v Secretary of State for Foreign and Commonwealth Affairs, ex parte Bancoult (No 2)
- Chagos Islanders v Attorney General
- Chagos Islanders v United Kingdom

== Sources ==
=== Court decisions ===
- Bancoult v. McNamara, 445 F.3d 427 (D.C. Cir. April 21, 2006).
- "Docket No. 06-502: Bancoult v. McNamara". Supreme Court of the United States. January 16, 2007. Certiorari denied, 549 U.S. 1166 (2007).
- "Bancoult et al. v. McNamara et al., No. 06-502 (January 16, 2007)". United States Reports (PDF). Vol. 549. Supreme Court of the United States. p. 1166.
- "Bancoult v. McNamara, 1:01-cv-02629 (D.D.C.)". CourtListener. Free Law Project.

=== Other sources ===
- Clement, Paul D.; et al. (December 2006). "Brief for the Respondents in Opposition, Bancoult v. McNamara, No. 06-502". Office of the Solicitor General, United States Department of Justice.
- "Federal Courts – Political Question Doctrine – D.C. Circuit Holds Claims of Harms to Native Inhabitants of the British Indian Ocean Territory Caused by the Construction of a U.S. Military Base Nonjusticiable – Bancoult v. McNamara, 445 F.3d 427 (D.C. Cir. 2006)" (PDF). Harvard Law Review. 120 (3): 860–867. January 2007.
