= American Trucking Associations v. City of Los Angeles =

- Supreme Court of the United States

Argued April 16, 2013 Decided June 13, 2013
- Full case name: American Trucking Associations Inc. v. City of Los Angeles, California
- Docket no.: 11-798
- Citations: 569 U.S. 641 (more) 133 S. Ct. 2096; 186 L. Ed. 2d 177; 2013 U.S. LEXIS 4539
- Argument: Oral argument

Case history
- Prior: 660 F.3d 384 (9th Cir. 2011)

Court membership
- Chief Justice John Roberts Associate Justices Antonin Scalia · Anthony Kennedy; Clarence Thomas · Ruth Bader Ginsburg; Stephen Breyer · Samuel Alito; Sonia Sotomayor · Elena Kagan

Case opinions
- Majority: Kagan, joined by unanimous
- Concurrence: Thomas

American Trucking Ass'ns, Inc. v. City of Los Angeles, 569 U.S. 641 (2013), was a case in which the Supreme Court of the United States held that certain regulations imposed by City of Los Angeles on trucking companies were preempted by federal law. In 2006 the Board of Harbor Commissioners for Los Angeles, California adopted an environmental protection plan that included an effort called Clean Truck Program (CTP). The stated goal of the program is to "reduce negative impacts that port [trucking] inflicts on the local community." The implementation of this program began in 2007 and required trucking companies to comply with various requirements relating to maintenance of trucks, employment of drivers, and trucking operations. The American Trucking Associations believed some of the regulations were in violation of the Federal Aviation Administration Authorization Act of 1994 (FAAAA) and filed suit. Litigation eventually made its way up to the Supreme Court of the United States, where the Court held that two of the requirements of the CTP were in violation of the FAAAA.
