= Millbrook v. United States =

- Supreme Court of the United States

Argued February 19, 2013 Decided March 27, 2013
- Full case name: Millbrook v. United States
- Docket no.: 11-10362
- Citations: 569 U.S. 50 (more) 133 S. Ct. 1441; 185 L. Ed. 2d 531; 2013 U.S. LEXIS 2543; 81 U.S.L.W. 4223
- Opinion announcement: Opinion announcement

Case history
- Prior: Summary judgement for defendant, unreported No. 3:11-cv-00131 (M.D. Pa. February 16, 2012); affirmed, 477 F. App'x 4 (3d Cir. 2012); cert. granted, 567 U.S. 968 (2012).

Holding
- The Federal Tort Claims Act waives the sovereign immunity of the United States for certain intentional torts by law enforcement officers.

Court membership
- Chief Justice John Roberts Associate Justices Antonin Scalia · Anthony Kennedy; Clarence Thomas · Ruth Bader Ginsburg; Stephen Breyer · Samuel Alito; Sonia Sotomayor · Elena Kagan

Case opinion
- Majority: Thomas, joined by unanimous

Laws applied
- Federal Tort Claims Act (28 U.S.C. §§1346(b), 2671–2680)

Millbrook v. United States, 569 U.S. 50 (2013), is a decision by the Supreme Court of the United States that holds that the Federal Tort Claims Act (FTCA) waives the sovereign immunity of the United States for certain intentional torts committed by law enforcement officers. The unanimous opinion, delivered by Justice Clarence Thomas, holds that law enforcement "employment" duties are not limited to searches, seizures of evidence, or arrests, and, as such, the petitioner can sue. As this case revolved around sovereign immunity waivers and not the merits, the Court did not decide upon the merits of the lawsuits.

== Background ==
At the time of the initial lawsuit, Kim Lee Millbrook was an inmate at a federal prison in Pennsylvania. He claimed he was sexually assaulted by prison guards in March 2010. Judge William J. Nealon of the federal district court in Scranton, Pennsylvania, dismissed the case on the basis of sovereign immunity. The federal appeals court in Philadelphia affirmed the ruling, stating that the FTCA only applied if the officer committed the assault while "executing a search, seizing evidence, or making an arrest." Millbrook then filed a hand-written appeal, without a lawyer, to the Supreme Court. The Supreme Court agreed to hear the case and appointed Christopher J. Paolella, a former law clerk to Justice Samuel Alito, to represent Millbrook.

== Opinion of the Court ==
On March 27, 2013, Justice Clarence Thomas delivered the unanimous opinion of the Court which held that people can sue the federal government under the FTCA for "acts or omissions of law enforcement officers that arise within the scope of their employment, regardless of whether the officers are engaged in investigative or law enforcement activity, or are executing a search, seizing evidence, or making an arrest."
