= Metrish v. Lancaster =

- Supreme Court of the United States

Decided May 20, 2013
- Full case name: Metrish v. Lancaster
- Citations: 569 U.S. 351 (more)

Holding
- The Michigan Court of Appeals' rejection of a due-process habeas claim was not an unreasonable application of the Supreme Court's criminal retroactivity case law.

Court membership
- Chief Justice John Roberts Associate Justices Antonin Scalia · Anthony Kennedy; Clarence Thomas · Ruth Bader Ginsburg; Stephen Breyer · Samuel Alito; Sonia Sotomayor · Elena Kagan

Case opinion
- Majority: Ginsburg, joined by unanimous

Metrish v. Lancaster, 569 U.S. 351 (2013), was a United States Supreme Court case in which the court held that the Michigan Court of Appeals' rejection of a due-process habeas claim was not an unreasonable application of the Supreme Court's criminal retroactivity case law. The Supreme Court analyzed the case under Bouie v. City of Columbia and Rogers v. Tennessee.

== Background ==
On April 23, 1993, Burt Lancaster (no relation), a former police officer with a long history of severe mental-health problems, shot and killed his girlfriend. At his 1994 jury trial in Michigan state court, Lancaster asserted a defense of diminished capacity. Under then-prevailing Michigan Court of Appeals precedent, the diminished-capacity defense permitted a legally sane defendant to present evidence of mental illness to negate the specific intent required to commit a particular crime. Apparently unpersuaded by Lancaster's defense, the jury convicted him of first-degree murder and a related firearm offense. Lancaster, however, later obtained federal habeas relief from these convictions.

By the time of Lancaster's retrial, the Michigan Supreme Court had rejected the diminished-capacity defense in its 2001 decision in People v. Carpenter. Although the murder with which Lancaster was charged occurred several years before Carpenter was decided, the judge at his second trial applied Carpenter and therefore disallowed renewal of his diminished-capacity defense. Lancaster was again convicted. Affirming, the Michigan Court of Appeals rejected Lancaster's argument that the trial court's retroactive application of Carpenter violated due process.

Lancaster reasserted his due process claim in a federal habeas petition. The district court denied the petition, but the Sixth Circuit Court of Appeals reversed. Concluding that the Michigan Supreme Court's 2001 rejection of the diminished-capacity defense was unforeseeable in April 1993, when Lancaster killed his girlfriend, the Sixth Circuit held that the Michigan Court of Appeals had unreasonably applied clearly established federal law by rejecting Lancaster's due process claim.
