= Louis Olivier Bancoult =

Chagossian activist (born 1964)

Louis Olivier Bancoult GCSK
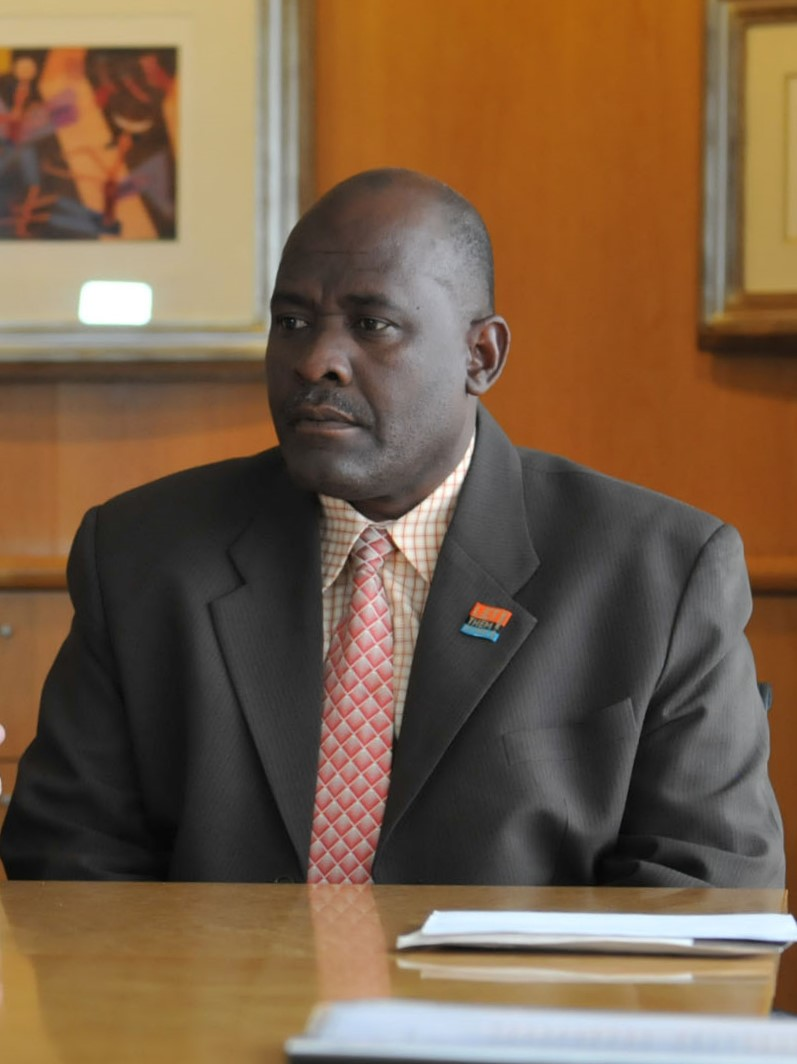
- Bancoult in 2013
- Born: 15 February 1964 (age 62); Île du Coin, Peros Banhos, Chagos Archipelago
- Occupation: Activist
- Organization: Chagos Refugees Group
- Known for: Claimant in the Bancoult cases on the Chagossians' right to return
- Title: Chairman of the Chagos Refugees Group
- Awards: Officer of the Order of the Star and Key of the Indian Ocean (OSK); Grand Commander of the Order of the Star and Key of the Indian Ocean (GCSK, 2024)

Louis Olivier Bancoult (born 15 February 1964) is a Chagossian activist who campaigns for the right of return of the Chagossians to the Chagos Archipelago. He is the leader of the Chagos Refugees Group (CRG), an organisation of Chagossians in Mauritius, which he co-founded in 1983. Born on Peros Banhos, he went to Mauritius with his family as a young child in 1968, when they travelled there for medical treatment and were then not allowed to return to the islands.

Bancoult was the claimant in a series of cases in the English courts known as the Bancoult cases. In 2000 the High Court quashed the provision of the 1971 ordinance that had barred the islanders from the territory, but later challenges, including to the 2004 Orders in Council that restored the ban, were unsuccessful. He also sued the United States government, without success. After his legal options in the United Kingdom ran out he supported Mauritius's claim to sovereignty over the archipelago, and he was part of the Mauritian delegation at the International Court of Justice in 2018.

He supported the 2025 treaty under which the United Kingdom agreed that Mauritius would exercise sovereignty over the archipelago. In 2024 he was made a Grand Commander of the Order of the Star and Key of the Indian Ocean.

== Early life ==
According to a 2025 biography by the sociologist Ibrahim Alladin, Bancoult was born on 15 February 1964 on Île du Coin, one of the islands of Peros Banhos, to Julien Bancoult and Rita Elysée. Judge Patrick Robinson of the International Court of Justice also gave his birthplace as Peros Banhos and his year of birth as 1964.

In 1968 the family went to Mauritius so that his sister could receive medical treatment after an accident; she died there two months later. When his parents tried to arrange their passage home, they were told that they could not return because the land had been given to the United States for a military base. Bancoult told The Guardian in 2000: "My mother was crying because she was very sad about our beautiful country and our wonderful life." Most accounts say he was four when he left the islands. (Note: Judge Robinson's separate opinion in the 2019 advisory opinion says that Bancoult "would have left the archipelago when he was about one year old". The contemporary press accounts, his biographer and the international lawyer Philippe Sands all give four years old, and place the departure in 1968.) Giving evidence to a House of Commons committee in 2008, his solicitor said that the family had not been warned that they would be unable to return, and that they were stranded because the shipping link to the archipelago had been suspended.

The family settled in Mauritius, where, according to Alladin, they were poor and his mother worked long hours as a cleaner. He attended the Seeneevassen Primary School. His mother organised Chagossian protests with other women and brought him into the movement; he was once expelled from school for a week for taking part in a protest march.

Bancoult trained as an electrician. In Alladin's account, he joined Mauritius's Central Electricity Board as a labourer in 1991, became an assistant tradesman in 1993, a technician in 1999 and an office assistant in 2010.

== Chagos Refugees Group ==
Bancoult co-founded the Chagos Refugees Group (French: Groupe Réfugiés Chagos) in 1983 with Charlesia Alexis, Lisette Talate and Claudette Lefade, to campaign for the Chagossians' return and for compensation. (Note: The CRG's own website lists his mother, Rita Élysée Bancoult, among the group's founders.) According to Alladin, the Chagossian women, in particular Charlesia Alexis and Lisette Talate, were the first to support him. By 2000 Bancoult was the group's president and was described by the press as the community's leader. He has led it since, under the title of chairman or president.

Giving evidence to the House of Commons Foreign Affairs Committee in January 2008, he introduced himself as "leader of the Chagos Refugee Group, and elected representative of the Chagossian community in Mauritius". According to Le Mauricien in 2023, he oversees a welfare fund that receives an annual grant of seven million Mauritian rupees from the Mauritian government. The group's headquarters are at Pointe aux Sables, on the outskirts of Port Louis.

== Litigation ==
According to Judge Robinson, Bancoult has been involved "in a representative capacity either directly or indirectly in all of the litigation" since the Chagossians' removal. The cases were conducted by the London solicitor Richard Gifford.

=== Bancoult (No 1), 2000 ===
In 1999 Bancoult was given permission to challenge the ban on the islanders entering the territory. He sought judicial review of the 1971 Immigration Ordinance, and on 3 November 2000 the Divisional Court quashed section 4 of the ordinance, holding that the power to legislate for the territory's "peace, order and good government" did not extend to excluding its population. The government did not appeal.

=== Bancoult v. McNamara, 2001–2007 ===
In December 2001 Bancoult, the CRG and other Chagossians sued the United States government and former officials, including Robert McNamara. The Court of Appeals for the D.C. Circuit held in 2006 that the claims raised non-justiciable political questions, and the Supreme Court of the United States declined to hear an appeal in 2007.

=== Group action, 2002–2003 ===
In the group action for compensation brought by Chagossians against the British government in 2002, the claimants living in Mauritius were represented by the CRG, which he chaired; the High Court struck the claims out in October 2003. (Note: The case is Chagos Islanders v Attorney General. Bancoult was not the named claimant.)

=== Bancoult (No 2), 2004–2008 ===
In 2004 the government reimposed the ban by Orders in Council made under the royal prerogative. On Bancoult's application the Divisional Court quashed section 9 of the Constitution Order on 11 May 2006. He told the BBC: "We have won a historic judgement in our favour to allow us to return to our homeland." The Court of Appeal dismissed the government's appeal on 23 May 2007; outside the court Bancoult said, "It's always been my dream to go home and I will go." On 22 October 2008 the House of Lords allowed the government's appeal by three votes to two, upholding the Orders.

=== Bancoult (No 3), 2010–2018 ===
Bancoult challenged the Chagos Marine Protected Area, declared in 2010, arguing that it had been created for the improper purpose of preventing resettlement. The Divisional Court dismissed the claim in 2013 and the Court of Appeal dismissed his appeal in 2014. On 8 February 2018 the Supreme Court dismissed his further appeal by five to two, holding that a leaked United States diplomatic cable was admissible in evidence but would not have altered the outcome.

=== Application to reopen Bancoult (No 2), 2016 ===
After documents came to light about the drafting of the 2002 feasibility study on resettlement, which had not been disclosed in the earlier proceedings, Bancoult applied to the Supreme Court to set aside the 2008 decision of the House of Lords. On 29 June 2016 the court refused by three to two, holding that the documents would not have changed the outcome.

=== Hoareau and Bancoult, 2017–2020 ===
Bancoult and Solange Hoareau, a Chagossian living in Seychelles, challenged the government's 2016 decision not to support resettlement. The Divisional Court dismissed the claims on 8 February 2019, and the Court of Appeal dismissed the appeal on 30 July 2020. In 2019 Judge Robinson wrote that the Chagossians, Bancoult among them, had "not been able to return to their home as a result of United Kingdom laws and decisions of its courts".

== Advocacy ==
=== United Kingdom and international bodies ===
In February 2007, as the government's appeal in Bancoult (No 2) was heard, Bancoult joined Chagossians protesting against it, saying that the Chagossians had come "to ask for our rights, for our fundamental rights, for our dignity as a people". In his evidence to the Foreign Affairs Committee on 23 January 2008 he described the community's arrival in Mauritius as "a nightmare", and asked the committee to recommend that the government consult the Chagossians on their return and develop a proposal for funding resettlement. In 2009 he told Inter Press Service that his resettlement plan, submitted to the British government in 2007, proposed a fishing industry to provide jobs.

In September 2016 he accompanied Anerood Jugnauth in a Mauritian delegation to the United Nations. In January 2018, before the advisory proceedings on the Chagos Archipelago at the International Court of Justice, he met Prime Minister Pravind Jugnauth to present a draft memorandum to the government on behalf of the CRG. At the court's hearings in September 2018 he sat as a member of the Mauritian delegation, listed as "Chairman and Leader of Chagos Refugees Group", and was among the Chagossians whose presence counsel for Mauritius, Sands, acknowledged in his closing speech. In his separate opinion to the 2019 advisory opinion, Judge Robinson described Bancoult as "the founder and Chairperson of the Chagos Refugee Group".

=== Return voyage, 2022 ===
In February 2022 Bancoult was one of five Chagossians who landed on Peros Banhos from a boat chartered by the Mauritian government, the first Chagossians to visit the islands without a British escort or British authorisation. On landing he said, "This is a great moment", and called the British government "racist" for ignoring Chagossian demands for the right to return.

=== The 2024 agreement and 2025 treaty ===
Pravind Jugnauth met Bancoult following the announcement on 3 October 2024 of the political agreement between the United Kingdom and Mauritius on the archipelago. He told Scroll.in that the Chagossians would "seize this opportunity", adding: "We will return to Peros Banhos and Salomon, our native islands." In 2025 he told Al Jazeera that his group had been excluded from the negotiations but had received regular briefings from successive prime ministers.

On 23 August 2025 he led a group of Chagossians to a private audience with Pope Leo XIV, who affirmed the right of people to return home after unjust exile. After the British government withdrew a motion on the treaty's implementing bill in the House of Lords in November 2025, he said that the bill would make possible the return and compensation for which the CRG had fought. In March 2026 he led Chagossian representatives received by the Mauritian inter-ministerial committee on the treaty, and said afterwards that the community was closely involved in decisions. In April 2026 he announced plans to lead a delegation to the United Kingdom to meet parliamentarians from several parties, and in June CRG members travelled there to lobby British political parties.

== Positions ==
On sovereignty, Bancoult told the Foreign Affairs Committee in 2008 that the Chagossians' priority was their fundamental rights, "because, as far as sovereignty is concerned, that is an issue between two Governments". In 2009 he said that the Chagossians could live alongside the United States base on Diego Garcia "until the archipelago is freed". After his cases in the English courts failed, he backed Mauritius's claim to sovereignty.

He supported the 2024 agreement, telling Al Jazeera: "They will offer resettlement. How could I oppose that even if it is not 100 percent satisfactory?" He has said that Chagossians should be allowed to work on the base if foreign workers are employed there, and dismissed concerns about Chinese influence under Mauritian sovereignty: "Knowing that there is a US military base there, I don't think Mauritius would be so stupid." In 2026, after United States President Donald Trump opposed the treaty, he said: "International law is squarely on our side."

He has opposed Misley Mandarin, whose self-declared Chagossian Government favours continued British sovereignty. In January 2026 he called Mandarin's appeal to Trump to block the treaty a betrayal of the Chagossian people and of the Mauritian state, and in April 2026 he questioned the legitimacy of Mandarin's election as "first minister", contrasting it with the elections of Chagossian representatives in Mauritius supervised by the Electoral Commission.

== Criticism ==
Some Chagossian groups oppose Bancoult's support for Mauritian sovereignty. In January 2026 the UK-based group Chagossian Voices objected to what it described as the apparent exclusive recognition of the CRG as the representative body of Chagossians in Mauritius in the governance of the treaty's trust fund.

Bancoult has rejected claims that Chagossians were not consulted. In 2024 he told JusticeInfo.net that the Mauritian prime minister had consulted the Chagossians "every time he had a negotiation". In 2025 he said that the British government had kept Chagossian groups in the United Kingdom informed, and argued that most opponents of the treaty had been born in Mauritius rather than on the islands.

== Recognition ==
By 2018 Bancoult held the Mauritian honour of Officer of the Order of the Star and Key of the Indian Ocean (OSK). In February 2023 the Mouvement réunionnais pour la paix, a peace organisation in Réunion, announced that it had submitted the CRG, Bancoult and Liseby Elysé as candidates for the Nobel Peace Prize. In March 2024 he was made a Grand Commander of the order (GCSK), the highest distinction in that year's Republic honours list. In his 2019 separate opinion, Judge Robinson wrote that Bancoult "deserves a prestigious international award for the courage and tenacity he has shown on behalf of his people".

== See also ==
- Detachment of the Chagos Archipelago
- Chagos Archipelago sovereignty dispute
- Expulsion of the Chagossians
- R (on the application of Bancoult (No 2)) v Secretary of State for Foreign and Commonwealth Affairs

== Sources ==
=== Court and official records ===
- R v Secretary of State for the Foreign and Commonwealth Office, ex parte Bancoult, EWHC (Admin) 413 (High Court (Divisional Court) 3 November 2000).
- Chagos Islanders v Attorney General and HM BIOT Commissioner, EWHC (QB) 2222 (High Court 9 October 2003).
- R (Bancoult) v Secretary of State for Foreign and Commonwealth Affairs, EWHC (Admin) 1038 (High Court (Divisional Court) 11 May 2006).
- R (Bancoult) v Secretary of State for Foreign and Commonwealth Affairs, EWCA Civ 498 (Court of Appeal 23 May 2007).
- R (Bancoult) v Secretary of State for Foreign and Commonwealth Affairs (No 2), UKHL 61 (House of Lords 22 October 2008).
- R (Bancoult) v Secretary of State for Foreign and Commonwealth Affairs, EWHC (Admin) 1502 (High Court (Divisional Court) 11 June 2013).
- R (Bancoult) v Secretary of State for Foreign and Commonwealth Affairs, EWCA Civ 708 (Court of Appeal 23 May 2014).
- R (Bancoult No 2) v Secretary of State for Foreign and Commonwealth Affairs, UKSC 35 (Supreme Court 29 June 2016).
- R (Bancoult No 3) v Secretary of State for Foreign and Commonwealth Affairs, UKSC 3 (Supreme Court 8 February 2018).
- R (Hoareau and Bancoult) v Secretary of State for Foreign and Commonwealth Affairs, EWHC (Admin) 221 (High Court (Divisional Court) 8 February 2019).
- R (Hoareau and Bancoult) v Secretary of State for Foreign and Commonwealth Affairs, EWCA Civ 1010 (Court of Appeal 30 July 2020).
- Bancoult v. McNamara, 445 F.3d 427 (D.C. Cir. 21 April 2006).
- "Docket No. 06-502: Bancoult v. McNamara". Supreme Court of the United States. 16 January 2007. Certiorari denied, 549 U.S. 1166 (2007).
- Robinson, Patrick (25 February 2019). "Separate opinion of Judge Robinson" (PDF). Legal Consequences of the Separation of the Chagos Archipelago from Mauritius in 1965, Advisory Opinion. I.C.J. Reports 2019. International Court of Justice. p. 294.
- International Court of Justice (3 September 2018). Public sitting held on Monday 3 September 2018 (CR 2018/20) (Report). International Court of Justice.
- House of Commons Foreign Affairs Committee (23 January 2008). Overseas Territories: Oral evidence, 23 January 2008 (Q112) (Report). UK Parliament.
- House of Commons Foreign Affairs Committee (23 January 2008). Overseas Territories: Oral evidence, 23 January 2008 (Q170) (Report). UK Parliament.
- "PM meets Mr Bancoult following historic political agreement between Mauritius and UK on the exercise of sovereignty over Chagos Archipelago". Republic of Mauritius – News. Government of Mauritius. 3 October 2024.

=== News and other sources ===
- Alladin, Ibrahim (12 February 2025). ""Olivier Bancoult. A Cry for Freedom. The Story of Chagos"". Le Mauricien.
- Mann, Natasha (13 July 2000). "Island strife". The Guardian.
- "Trente-cinq ans après leur expulsion, la revanche des indigènes des îles Chagos". Le Temps (in French). 4 November 2000.
- "Rights-Chagos: 'My Navel is Buried There'". Inter Press Service. 21 November 2009.
- Schmidt, Christian (23 January 2015). "Zurück ins Paradies". Tages-Anzeiger (in German). p. 8.
- "Court victory for Chagos families". BBC News. 11 May 2006.
- "UK seeks to ban Chagossian return". Al Jazeera English. 5 February 2007.
- "Chagossians win right to go home". Al Jazeera English. 23 May 2007.
- Harding, Andrew (12 February 2022). "Chagos islanders in emotional, historic trip home". BBC News.
- Lebrasse, Sarah Jane (12 October 2023). "Sovereignty and decolonization: Chagos Islanders confront their postcolonial future". Le Mauricien.
- Mallinder, Lorraine (11 February 2025). "'Tug of war': Chagos Islands deal tearing families apart in Mauritius". Al Jazeera English.
- Arjanee, Ameerah (2 October 2026). "UK-Mauritius Chagos sovereignty deal stalls amid fears of further delays". Al Jazeera English.
- Grylls, George (22 February 2025). "Abandoned Chagos exiles head for new life in Britain". The Times. Port Louis.
- Sundarji, Padma Rao (10 October 2024). "Thank you India – and Mahatma: For Chagos Island refugees, a long battle and a note of gratitude". Scroll.in.
- Anderson, Janet H. (22 November 2024). "Will the Chagos treaty address the wrongs of the past?". JusticeInfo.net.
- Winfield, Nicole (23 August 2025). "Pope affirms right of people to return home after unjust exile in meeting with Chagos refugees". Associated Press.
- "Refugee Chagos Group meet the Prime Minister". Le Défi Media. 30 January 2018.
- "Olivier Bancoult : « Une véritable trahison envers le peuple chagossien et l'État »". Le Défi Media (in French). 12 January 2026.
- Edouard, Olivia (9 February 2023). "Le Groupe réfugiés Chagos, Olivier Bancoult et Liseby Élysé candidats au Prix Nobel de la Paix". L'Express (in French).
- "Décorés de la République 2024 : and the winners are…". L'Express (in French). 12 March 2024.
- "Ile Maurice: «Qui sont les plus légitimes ? Les déracinés ou les troisièmes générations nées au pays ?»". L'Express (in French). 8 November 2025 – via allAfrica.
- "Ile Maurice: Des inquiétudes exprimées sur la gouvernance du Trust Fund par Chagossian Voices". L'Express (in French). 9 January 2026 – via allAfrica.
- "Ile Maurice: Bancoult veut faire entendre «la vraie voix» de la communauté à Londres". L'Express (in French). 28 April 2026 – via allAfrica.
- "Chagos deal : Olivier Bancoult satisfait des échanges, les représentants des chagossiens consultés". L'Express (in French). 3 March 2026.
- "Home CRG – Chagos Refugees Group". Chagos Refugees Group. Self-published; cited only for the group's own account of its founders.
