= City of Arlington v. FCC =

City of Arlington v. Federal Communications Commission
- Supreme Court of the United States

Argued Jan 16, 2013 Decided May 20, 2013
- Full case name: City of Arlington v. FCC
- Citations: 569 U.S. 290 (more)

Holding
- Courts must apply the Chevron framework to an agency's interpretation of a statutory ambiguity that concerns the scope of the agency's statutory authority (i.e., its jurisdiction).

Court membership
- Chief Justice John Roberts Associate Justices Antonin Scalia · Anthony Kennedy; Clarence Thomas · Ruth Bader Ginsburg; Stephen Breyer · Samuel Alito; Sonia Sotomayor · Elena Kagan

Case opinions
- Majority: Scalia, joined by Thomas, Ginsburg, Sotomayor, and Kagan
- Concurrence: Breyer (in part)
- Dissent: Roberts, joined by Kennedy and Alito

City of Arlington v. Federal Communications Commission, 569 U.S. 290 (2013), was a United States Supreme Court case in which the court held that courts must apply the Chevron framework to an agency's interpretation of a statutory ambiguity that concerns the scope of the agency's statutory authority (i.e., its jurisdiction).

== Background ==
The Communications Act of 1934, as amended, requires state or local governments to act on siting applications for wireless facilities "within a reasonable period of time after the request is duly filed." Relying on its broad authority to implement the Communications Act the Federal Communications Commission (FCC) issued a declaratory ruling concluding that the phrase "reasonable period of time" is presumptively (but rebuttably) 90 days to process an application to place a new antenna on an existing tower and 150 days to process all other applications. The cities of Arlington and San Antonio, Texas, sought review of the declaratory ruling in the Fifth Circuit Court of Appeals. They argued that the FCC lacked authority to interpret these timeliness limitations. The Court of Appeals, relying on Circuit precedent holding that Chevron U. S. A. Inc. v. Natural Resources Defense Council, Inc. applies to an agency's interpretation of its own statutory jurisdiction, applied Chevron to that question. Finding the statute ambiguous, it upheld the FCC's view that the statute's broad grant of regulatory authority empowered it to administer the timeliness limitations as a permissible construction of the statute.
