= Bullock v. BankChampaign, N.A. =

- Supreme Court of the United States

Decided May 13, 2013
- Full case name: Bullock v. BankChampaign, N.A.
- Citations: 569 U.S. 267 (more)

Holding
- The term "defalcation" in the Bankruptcy Code includes a scienter requirement involving knowledge of, or gross recklessness in respect to, the improper nature of the fiduciary behavior.

Court membership
- Chief Justice John Roberts Associate Justices Antonin Scalia · Anthony Kennedy; Clarence Thomas · Ruth Bader Ginsburg; Stephen Breyer · Samuel Alito; Sonia Sotomayor · Elena Kagan

Case opinion
- Majority: Breyer, joined by unanimous

Bullock v. BankChampaign, N.A., 569 U.S. 267 (2013), was a United States Supreme Court case in which the court held that the term "defalcation" in the Bankruptcy Code includes a scienter requirement involving knowledge of, or gross recklessness in respect to, the improper nature of the fiduciary behavior.

== Background ==
Bullock's father established a trust for the benefit of Bullock and his siblings, and he made Bullock the (nonprofessional) trustee. The trust's sole asset was the father's life insurance policy. Bullock borrowed funds from the trust three times; all borrowed funds were repaid with interest. His siblings obtained a judgment against him in state court for breach of fiduciary duty, though the court found no apparent malicious motive. The court imposed constructive trusts on some of Bullock's interests—including his interest in the original trust—in order to secure Bullock's payment of the judgment, and BankChampaign, N.A. served as trustee for all of the trusts. Bullock filed for bankruptcy. BankChampaign opposed discharge of Bullock's state-court-imposed debts to the trust, and the Bankruptcy Court granted BankChampaign summary judgment, holding that Bullock's debts were not dischargeable pursuant to 11 U. S. C. §523(a)(4). That section provides that a person cannot obtain a bankruptcy discharge from a debt "for fraud or defalcation while acting in a fiduciary capacity, embezzlement, or larceny." The federal District Court and the Eleventh Circuit Court of Appeals affirmed. The latter court reasoned that "defalcation requires a known breach of fiduciary duty, such that the conduct can be characterized as objectively reckless."

== Opinion of the court ==
On May 13, 2013, Justice Breyer delivered the opinion of the Supreme Court.
