= Federal Employees Liability Reform and Tort Compensation Act of 1988 =

US federal law

- Long title: A bill to amend title 28, United States Code, to provide for an exclusive remedy against the United States for suits based upon certain negligent or wrongful acts or omissions of United States employees committed within the scope of their employment, and for other purposes.
- Nicknames: Westfall Act
- Enacted by: the 100th United States Congress

Citations
- Public law: Pub. L. 100–694

Codification
- Acts amended: Federal Tort Claims Act
- U.S.C. sections amended: 28 U.S.C. § 2679

Legislative history
- Introduced in the House of Representatives as H.R. 4612 by Barney Frank (D‑MA); Signed into law by President Ronald Reagan on November 18, 1988

The Federal Employees Liability Reform and Tort Compensation Act of 1988, also known as the Westfall Act, is a law passed by the United States Congress that modifies the Federal Tort Claims Act to protect federal employees from common law tort lawsuit while engaged in their duties for the government, while giving private citizens a route to seek damage from the government for violations. The law was passed in response to the United States Supreme Court's decision in Westfall v. Erwin, 484 U.S. 292 (1988), which had created a precedent that left federal employees open to liability to civil suits for actions they took while performing their duties for the government.

== Background ==
Since Bivens v. Six Unknown Named Agents, 403 U.S. 388 (1971), the Supreme Court has upheld that individual federal officers can be liable for civil tort suits for violations of constitutional rights that occur as part of their duties. The Supreme Court case Westfall v. Erwin, 484 U.S. 292 (1988), involved a warehouse worker, William Erwin, who had been working on an army depot who suffered physical injuries from the spilled contents of a bag of sodium carbonate in his face and eyes. Erwin sued the warehouse supervisor, Rodney Westfall, a member of the U.S. Army, along with other Army employees, for negligence. The district court ruled to dismiss the case on the basis that federal employees had absolute immunity for actions they perform in the course of their official duties. The Eleventh Circuit reversed this decision, and the Supreme Court unanimously upheld the Eleventh's reversal. In the Supreme Court's opinion, the assertion of absolute immunity could only apply if the federal official was performing the work during their duty and were exercising discretion. The Supreme Court asserted that exercising discretion involved either decision-making processes for high-level officials, or following Congress-defined procedures for lower-level officials. As Westfall was accused of being negligent, the Court determined that absolute immunity did not apply in upholding the Eleventh Circuit's decision.

Congress feared this decision would have serious ramifications throughout the government. According to Congressional reports, Congress considered that the decision created "an immediate crisis involving the prospect of personal liability and the threat of protracted personal tort litigation for the entire federal workforce", opening liability towards the lower ranks of the federal works for minor violations, such as lawsuits against employees over misplaced equipment or errors on governmental forms. Within months of the January 1988 decision in Westfall, Congress had started drafting a new law to address the decision. The new law was passed by both Houses and signed into law by President Ronald Reagan in November 1988.

== Legislation ==
The Federal Employees Liability Reform and Tort Compensation Act's primary purpose is "to protect federal employees from personal liability for common law torts committed within the scope of their employment, while providing persons injured by the common law torts of federal employees with an appropriate remedy against the United States". In execution, it modified the Federal Tort Claims Act by adding that in tort suits filed against federal employees for "negligent or wrongful act[s] or omission[s]...while acting within the scope of [their] office or employment", the employees are considered immune, and they are removed from such suits and instead replaced by the United States government and transferred to federal court.

== See also ==
- Qualified immunity
- Bancoult v. McNamara
- Rasul v. Myers
- Saleh v. Bush
- Wuterich v. Murtha
- E. Jean Carroll
