= PPL Corp. v. Commissioner of Internal Revenue =

- Supreme Court of the United States

Decided May 20, 2013
- Full case name: PPL Corp. v. Commissioner of Internal Revenue
- Citations: 569 U.S. 329 (more)

Holding
- A foreign tax is creditable against United States income taxes when the tax would be an income, war profits, or excess profits tax if it had been enacted in the United States.

Court membership
- Chief Justice John Roberts Associate Justices Antonin Scalia · Anthony Kennedy; Clarence Thomas · Ruth Bader Ginsburg; Stephen Breyer · Samuel Alito; Sonia Sotomayor · Elena Kagan

Case opinion
- Majority: Thomas, joined by unanimous

PPL Corp. v. Commissioner of Internal Revenue, 569 U.S. 329 (2013), was a United States Supreme Court case in which the court held that a foreign tax is creditable against United States income taxes when the tax would be an income, war profits, or excess profits tax if it had been enacted in the United States.

== Background ==
In 1997, the United Kingdom (U.K.), newly under Labour Party rule, imposed a one-time "windfall tax" on thirty-two U.K. companies privatized between 1984 and 1996 by the Conservative government. The companies had been sold to private parties through an initial sale of shares, known as a "flotation." Some of the companies were required to continue providing services for a fixed period at the same rates they had offered under government control. Many of those companies earned substantial profits in the intervening years.

PPL Corporation (PPL), part-owner of a privatized U.K. company subject to the windfall tax, claimed a credit for its share of the bill in its 1997 federal income-tax return, relying on Internal Revenue Code §901(b)(1), which states that any "income, war profits, and excess profits taxes" paid overseas are creditable against U.S. income taxes. Treasury Regulation §1.901–2(a)(1) interprets this section to mean that a foreign tax is creditable if its "predominant character" "is that of an income tax in the U. S. sense." The Commissioner of Internal Revenue rejected PPL's claim, but the Tax Court held that the U.K. windfall tax was creditable for U.S. tax purposes under §901. The Third Circuit Court of Appeals reversed.

== Opinion of the court ==
The Supreme Court issued an opinion on May 20, 2013.
