= Pelkey Lake =

Lake in the state of Minnesota, United States

- Location within Minnesota
- Location: Morrison County, Minnesota
- Coordinates: 45°59′30″N 94°13′41″W
- Type: lake

Pelkey Lake is a lake in Morrison County, in the U.S. state of Minnesota.

Pelkey Lake was named for an early settler.

== See also ==
- List of lakes in Minnesota
