= List of United States Supreme Court cases, volume 569 =

This is a list of all the United States Supreme Court cases from volume 569 of the United States Reports:

Case name	Citation	Date decided
Florida v. Jardines	569 U.S. 1	2013
The government's use of trained police dogs to investigate the home and its immediate surroundings is a "search" within the meaning of the Fourth Amendment.
Comcast Corp. v. Behrend	569 U.S. 27	2013
Courts certifying classes must thoroughly vet prospective classes for all four requirements even if the court's analysis touches on the merits of the claim.
Millbrook v. United States	569 U.S. 50	2013
The Federal Tort Claims Act waives the sovereign immunity of the United States for certain intentional torts by law enforcement officers.
Marshall v. Rodgers	569 U.S. 58	2013
In light of the tension between the Sixth Amendment's guarantee of the right to counsel at all critical stages of the criminal process and its concurrent promise of a constitutional right to proceed without counsel when a criminal defendant voluntarily and intelligently elects to do so, it cannot be said that California’s approach is contrary to or an unreasonable application of the general standards established by the Supreme Court's assistance-of-counsel cases. Because the habeas petition needed to be supported by clearly established law, the court denied it.
Genesis Healthcare Corp. v. Symczyk	569 U.S. 66	2013
Because respondent had no personal interest in representing putative, unnamed claimants, nor any other continuing interest that would preserve her suit from mootness, her suit was appropriately dismissed for lack of subject-matter jurisdiction.
US Airways, Inc. v. McCutchen	569 U.S. 88	2013
When someone seeks equitable relief to enforce an ERISA plan, the terms of the plans govern but equitable doctrines can fill gaps in the terms.
Kiobel v. Royal Dutch Petroleum Co.	569 U.S. 108	2013
The presumption against extraterritoriality applies to claims under the Alien Tort Statute.
Missouri v. McNeely	569 U.S. 141	2013
The fact that blood-alcohol levels dissipate after drinking ceases, is not a per se exigency pursuant to Schmerber v. California justifying an officer to order a blood test without obtaining a warrant from a neutral judge.
Moncrieffe v. Holder	569 U.S. 184	2013
If a noncitizen’s conviction for a marijuana distribution offense fails to establish that the offense involved either remuneration or more than a small amount of marijuana, it is not an aggravated felony under the Immigration and Nationality Act.
McBurney v. Young	569 U.S. 221	2013
A state can limit requests for state government documents exclusively to citizens of that state.
Boyer v. Louisiana	569 U.S. 238	2013
Dismissed as improvidently granted.
Dan's City Used Cars, Inc. v. Pelkey	569 U.S. 251	2013
Pelkey's claims against the tow company's impoundment and auction of his car do not relate to the transportation of property, and are not preempted by federal law.
Bullock v. BankChampaign, N.A.	569 U.S. 267	2013
The term "defalcation" in the Bankruptcy Code includes a scienter requirement involving knowledge of, or gross recklessness in respect to, the improper nature of the fiduciary behavior.
Bowman v. Monsanto Co.	569 U.S. 278	2013
Patent exhaustion does not permit a farmer to reproduce patented seeds through planting and harvesting without the patent holder's permission.
City of Arlington v. FCC	569 U.S. 290	2013
Courts must apply the Chevron U.S.A., Inc. v. Natural Resources Defense Council, Inc. framework to an agency's interpretation of a statutory ambiguity that concerns the scope of the agency's statutory authority (i.e., its jurisdiction).
PPL Corp. v. Comm'r	569 U.S. 329	2013
A foreign tax is creditable against United States income taxes when the tax would be an income, war profits, or excess profits tax if it had been enacted in the United States.
Metrish v. Lancaster	569 U.S. 351	2013
The Michigan Court of Appeals' rejection of a due-process habeas claim was not an unreasonable application of the Supreme Court's criminal retroactivity case law.
Sebelius v. Cloer	569 U.S. 369	2013
An untimely National Childhood Vaccine Injury Act petition may qualify for an award of attorney’s fees if it is filed in good faith and there is a reasonable basis for its claim.
McQuiggin v. Perkins	569 U.S. 383	2013
Actual innocence, if proved, serves as a gateway through which a petitioner may pass whether the impediment is a procedural bar or the expiration of the AEDPA statute of limitations.
Trevino v. Thaler	569 U.S. 413	2013
Expanded narrow exception to Coleman v. Thompson created by Martinez v. Ryan to state procedural schemes that deny criminal defendants a "meaningful opportunity" to raise an ineffective assistance of counsel claim on direct appeal.
Maryland v. King	569 U.S. 435	2013
When officers make an arrest supported by probable cause to hold for a serious offense and bring the suspect to the station to be detained in custody, taking and analyzing a cheek swab of the arrestee's DNA is, like fingerprinting and photographing, a legitimate police booking procedure that is reasonable under the Fourth Amendment.
Hillman v. Maretta	569 U.S. 483	2013
Section D of the Virginia statute is pre-empted by the Federal Employees’ Group Life Insurance Act.
Nevada v. Jackson	569 U.S. 505	2013
In a trial for rape, the defendant sought to introduce extrinsic evidence to impeach the accuser by showing that they had accused the defendant in the past. The exception to the rape-shield rule required the defendant to give notice of this intention so that they could hold a hearing about it. No decision of the Supreme Court clearly establishes that the notice requirement is unconstitutional, and the Supreme Court has never held that the Confrontation Clause entitles a criminal defendant to introduce extrinsic evidence for impeachment. Because the habeas petition needed to be supported by clearly established law, the court denied it.
Horne v. Dept. of Agric.	569 U.S. 513	2013
A farmer who is deemed to have violated an agricultural marketing order and seeks to argue that a fine assessed against them for this violation is an unconstitutional taking can bring the takings claim in a regular federal district court before paying the fine and is not required to bring that claim in the Court of Federal Claims.
Peugh v. United States	569 U.S. 530	2013
The Ex Post Facto Clause is violated when a defendant is sentenced under Guidelines promulgated after he committed his criminal acts and the new version provides a higher sentencing range than the version in place at the time of the offense.
Oxford Health Plans LLC v. Sutter	569 U.S. 564	2013
Under the limited judicial review allowed for decisions from binding arbitation, the sole question is whether the arbitrator arguably interpreted the parties' contract, not whether the arbitrator erred.
Ass'n for Molecular Pathology v. Myriad Genetics, Inc.	569 U.S. 576	2013
Naturally occurring DNA sequences, even when isolated from the body, cannot be patented, but artificially created DNA is patent eligible because it is not naturally occurring.
United States v. Davila	569 U.S. 597	2013
When a federal judge participates in the plea process in violation of Rule 11(c) of the Federal Rules of Criminal Procedure, a guilty plea need not be vacated if the record shows prejudice to the decision to plea due to Rule 11(h).
Tarrant Regional Water Dist. v. Herrmann	569 U.S. 614	2013
The Red River Compact does not preempt Oklahoma’s water statutes because the Compact creates no cross-border rights in its signatories for these statutes to infringe. Nor do Oklahoma’s laws run afoul of the Commerce Clause.
Am. Trucking Ass'ns, Inc. v. City of Los Angeles	569 U.S. 641	2013
