= Dan's City Used Cars, Inc. v. Pelkey =

- Supreme Court of the United States

Argued March 20, 2013 Decided May 13, 2013
- Full case name: Dan's City Used Cars, Inc. DBA Dan's City Auto Body v. Pelkey
- Docket no.: 12-52
- Citations: 569 U.S. 251 (more) 133 S. Ct. 1769; 185 L. Ed. 2d 909
- Argument: Oral argument

Holding
- Pelkey's claims against the tow company's impoundment and auction of his car do not relate to the transportation of property, and are not preempted by federal law.

Court membership
- Chief Justice John Roberts Associate Justices Antonin Scalia · Anthony Kennedy; Clarence Thomas · Ruth Bader Ginsburg; Stephen Breyer · Samuel Alito; Sonia Sotomayor · Elena Kagan

Case opinion
- Majority: Ginsburg, joined by unanimous

Laws applied
- 49 U.S.C. § 14501(c)(1)

Dan's City Used Cars, Inc. v. Pelkey, 569 U.S. 251 (2013), was a United States Supreme Court case in which the Court held that federal laws deregulating the transportation industry do not invalidate corresponding state provisions that regulate the seizure, storage, and sale of cars by towing companies. Robert Pelkey sued Dan's City Used Cars under New Hampshire law for unlawfully selling his vehicle. A lower court raised doubts as to whether the New Hampshire statute was valid at all, as Dan's City argued it was pre-empted by federal deregulation law, specifically, the Federal Aviation Administration Authorization Act, and the case eventually arrived before the Supreme Court. Agreeing with Pelkey, the justices named several conditions necessary for federal law to override state transportation regulations and narrowed the range of state transport laws subject to pre-emption.
