= Charlesia Alexis =

Chagossian singer and activist (1934–2012)

Charlesia Alexis (September 8, 1934 – December 16, 2012) was a Chagossian singer and activist, notable for helping establish the Chagos Refugee Group.

== Early life ==
She was born on Diego Garcia. Alexis and her family went to Port Louis on Mauritius in 1967 to get medical treatment for her husband. They were not permitted to return home afterwards because the United States wished to establish a military base in the archipelago.

== Career ==
In 1982, the British government paid compensation to the exiled Chagossians. However, by accepting the settlement, they also signed away their right to return. With Lisette Talate and Rita Bancoult, she established the Chagos Refugees Group in 1983. The Chagos Refugees Group took its battle to the British courts, winning in the lower courts but then seeing that result overturned by the Law Lords. The group next took their case to the European Court of Human Rights; in 2012, their case was judged inadmissible by that court.

In 2002, the displaced Chagossian were granted British citizenship. In 2004, Alexis settled in Crawley.

She also released several recordings of songs.

Alexis died in Crawley at the age of 78.
