= Chagos Refugees Group =

Chagossian organisation in Mauritius

- Groupe Réfugiés Chagos
- Abbreviation: CRG; GRC
- Formation: c. 1983
- Founder: Charlesia Alexis, Lisette Talate, Claudette Lefade, Olivier Bancoult
- Type: Non-profit association
- Headquarters: Pointe aux Sables, Port Louis, Mauritius
- Region served: Mauritius; United Kingdom (UK branch)
- Chairman: Olivier Bancoult

The Chagos Refugees Group (CRG; French: Groupe Réfugiés Chagos, GRC) is an organisation of Chagossians based in Mauritius. It was founded in about 1983 by Chagossians who had been removed from the Chagos Archipelago by the United Kingdom between 1967 and 1973, as "an Ilois group for Ilois". It has been chaired since the 1990s by Olivier Bancoult, who brought the series of cases in the English courts known as the Bancoult cases.

The group represented the Chagossians living in Mauritius in the 2002 group action for compensation in the English courts, and was a party to their lawsuit in the United States. Bancoult was part of the Mauritian delegation at the International Court of Justice in 2018. The CRG supported the 2025 treaty under which the United Kingdom accepts Mauritian sovereignty over the archipelago, and has been criticised by other Chagossian groups, mainly in the United Kingdom, which say they were not consulted and that the group is too close to the Mauritian government.

== History ==
=== Foundation and the Ilois Trust Fund, 1983–1989 ===
After the 1982 agreement between the United Kingdom and Mauritius, compensation was paid to the Chagossians through the Ilois Trust Fund Board. The main Chagossian organisation at the time, the Comité Ilois Organisation Fraternelle (CIOF), had supported the agreement. In 1983 some Chagossians became dissatisfied with the trust fund's decisions, and "A new group, the Groupe Refugies de Chagos, or CRG, came into being". The High Court found that it was started "in about mid 1983", with Charlesia Alexis as its first president; she was joined by Lisette Talate, Claudette Lefade and Olivier Bancoult, who became its first secretary. Alexis said in evidence that it had been founded in 1980. Bancoult told the court that it was founded "as an Ilois group for Ilois, because they felt betrayed by Mauritian politicians and intellectuals"; the judge found his evidence on this point unsatisfactory.

CRG representatives were elected to the trust fund board in September 1983. According to the High Court, they campaigned "to unblock the £250,000, to establish that the Ilois were British citizens, to obtain social benefits accordingly, to obtain £4m from the USA and to raise complaints against the UK Government in an international forum", and persuaded the board to pay for an American lawyer. By 1985 the group was arguing that the Chagossians had been exiled by coercion, and was threatening legal action. It lost influence in about 1989, when the CIOF regained the support of the community, and was dormant for some years.

=== Revival and litigation, 1998–2019 ===
In 1998 Bancoult, by then chairman of the CRG, began judicial review proceedings against the 1971 ordinance that had barred the islanders from the archipelago. According to the Chagossians' solicitor, the community "coalesced around this group" after permission was granted in June 1999, and the success of the case in 2000 enabled "Mr Bancoult's group to sweep the slate". The group, dormant until then, "had come back to life".

In the 2002 group action for compensation, the claimants living in Mauritius and Agaléga were "represented by the Chagos Refugees Group, chaired by Olivier Bancoult"; the claim was struck out in 2003. The CRG was also an appellant in Bancoult v. McNamara, the Chagossians' suit against the United States government; the United States Court of Appeals for the District of Columbia Circuit described it as a non-profit association working "to further the welfare of the Chagossians", and dismissed the claims in 2006 as non-justiciable political questions. In Bancoult (No 3), the challenge to the Chagos Marine Protected Area, the Supreme Court of the United Kingdom described Bancoult as "the chair of the Chagos Refugees Group", which "represents Chagossians whose removal from the Chagos Islands was procured by the United Kingdom government in the years 1971 to 1973". In 2019 the High Court described him as "a founder and ... the current chair" of the CRG, involved "in a representative capacity either directly or indirectly in all of the extensive litigation".

In March 2008 the CRG and the UK Chagos Support Association published Returning Home: A Proposal for the Resettlement of the Chagos Islands, which included a costed plan estimating resettlement at £25 million over five years. In September 2015 its representatives met the territory's Deputy Commissioner during the British government's consultation on resettlement.

=== International proceedings ===
Bancoult, described as "Chairman and Leader of Chagos Refugees Group", was a member of the Mauritian delegation at the hearings of the International Court of Justice in September 2018, together with representatives of the Chagossian community including Liseby Elysé, who addressed the court by video. In January 2018 the CRG had met the Prime Minister of Mauritius and submitted a memorandum to the government, and in February it announced its support for Mauritius before the court. In his separate opinion, Judge Patrick Robinson described Bancoult as the founder and chairperson of the Chagos Refugee Group, and said that he deserved a prestigious international award for the courage and tenacity he has shown on behalf of his people.

Human Rights Watch interviewed members of the CRG for its 2023 report on the Chagossians. Some members told it that they had never been opposed to the existence of the US base on Diego Garcia and that they wanted to live on the islands with it.

=== The 2025 treaty ===
The CRG supported the agreement announced by the United Kingdom and Mauritius in October 2024, under which Mauritius would be free to resettle the outer islands. Bancoult said, "How could I oppose that even if it is not 100 percent satisfactory?" He described the CRG as having "led the legal battle across the world", and said that it consists of 329 Chagossians born in Peros Banhos and Salomon islands. In November 2025, discussing the British implementing bill, he said that the group had fought for years for return and compensation, and that the bill made that possible. In June 2026, after ratification stalled, CRG members travelled to the United Kingdom to lobby British political parties. In August 2025 Bancoult led a group of about fifteen Chagossians to an audience with Pope Leo XIV, who affirmed the right of people to return home after unjust exile.

== Organisation ==
The group's headquarters are at Pointe aux Sables, on the outskirts of Port Louis. Bancoult has led it since at least 1998, with the title of chairman or president. A UK branch, based in Crawley, was chaired in 2016 by Sabrina Jean. In 2008 Bancoult told a House of Commons committee that he was the "elected representative of the Chagossian community in Mauritius", where there were 3,700 Chagossians. In 2026 he said that seven Chagossian representatives are elected every two years in Mauritius in an election supervised by the Electoral Commission.

According to Le Mauricien in 2023, Bancoult oversees a welfare fund that receives an annual grant of seven million Mauritian rupees from the Mauritian government, and met the Prime Minister monthly.

== Criticism ==
Other Chagossian groups, particularly in the United Kingdom, have opposed the CRG's support for the 2025 treaty. Claudette Lefade, a founder member who later led the group Chagos Asylum People, left the CRG and works "in direct opposition to it"; according to Le Mauricien, her members "feel that Bancoult and the CRG have sold them out", and she regards Bancoult as "beholden" to the Mauritian government. In January 2026 the UK-based group Chagossian Voices criticised what it called the apparent exclusive recognition of the CRG as the representative body of Chagossians in Mauritius in the governance of the treaty's trust fund. The CRG is also at odds with Misley Mandarin, whose self-declared Chagossian Government supports continued British sovereignty; Bancoult called Mandarin's proclamation as "first minister" a betrayal, and questioned the legitimacy of his election.

== Recognition ==
In February 2023 the Mouvement réunionnais pour la paix nominated the CRG, Bancoult and Elysé for the Nobel Peace Prize. In March 2024 Bancoult was made a Grand Commander of the Order of the Star and Key of the Indian Ocean (GCSK), the highest class of the order.

== See also ==
- Chagossians
- Expulsion of the Chagossians
- Louis Olivier Bancoult

== Sources ==
=== Court and official records ===
- Chagos Islanders v Attorney General and HM BIOT Commissioner, EWHC (QB) 2222 (High Court 9 October 2003).
- Bancoult v. McNamara, 445 F.3d 427 (D.C. Cir. 21 April 2006).
- R (Bancoult No 3) v Secretary of State for Foreign and Commonwealth Affairs, UKSC 3 (Supreme Court 8 February 2018).
- R (Hoareau and Bancoult) v Secretary of State for Foreign and Commonwealth Affairs, EWHC (Admin) 221 (High Court (Divisional Court) 8 February 2019).
- Legal Consequences of the Separation of the Chagos Archipelago from Mauritius in 1965, Advisory Opinion (PDF). I.C.J. Reports 2019. International Court of Justice. 25 February 2019. p. 95.
- Robinson, Patrick (25 February 2019). "Separate opinion of Judge Robinson" (PDF). Legal Consequences of the Separation of the Chagos Archipelago from Mauritius in 1965, Advisory Opinion. I.C.J. Reports 2019. International Court of Justice. p. 294.
- International Court of Justice (3 September 2018). Public sitting held on Monday 3 September 2018 (CR 2018/20) (Report). International Court of Justice.
- House of Commons Foreign Affairs Committee (23 January 2008). Overseas Territories: Oral evidence, 23 January 2008 (Q112) (Report). UK Parliament.
- House of Commons Foreign Affairs Committee (23 January 2008). Overseas Territories: Oral evidence, 23 January 2008 (Q170) (Report). UK Parliament.
- Baldwin, Clive; Human Rights Watch (15 February 2023). "That's When the Nightmare Started": UK and US Forced Displacement of the Chagossians and Ongoing Colonial Crimes (PDF) (Report). Human Rights Watch. ISBN 979-8-88708-029-1.

=== News and other sources ===
- Alladin, Ibrahim (12 February 2025). ""Olivier Bancoult. A Cry for Freedom. The Story of Chagos"". Le Mauricien.
- Mallinder, Lorraine (11 February 2025). "'Tug of war': Chagos Islands deal tearing families apart in Mauritius". Al Jazeera English.
- "UK-Mauritius Chagos sovereignty deal stalls amid fears of further delays". Al Jazeera English. 2 October 2026.
- Lebrasse, Sarah Jane (12 October 2023). "Sovereignty and decolonization: Chagos Islanders confront their postcolonial future". Le Mauricien.
- "Groupe Réfugiés Chagos : « Soutien à Maurice devant la CIJ »". Le Mauricien (in French). 9 February 2018.
- "Refugee Chagos Group meet the Prime Minister". Le Défi Media. 30 January 2018.
- "Olivier Bancoult : « Une véritable trahison envers le peuple chagossien et l'État »". Le Défi Media (in French). 12 January 2026.
- Sundarji, Padma Rao (10 October 2024). "Thank you India – and Mahatma: For Chagos Island refugees, a long battle and a note of gratitude". Scroll.in.
- "Ile Maurice: «Qui sont les plus légitimes ? Les déracinés ou les troisièmes générations nées au pays ?»". L'Express (in French). 8 November 2025 – via allAfrica.
- "Ile Maurice: Des inquiétudes exprimées sur la gouvernance du Trust Fund par Chagossian Voices". L'Express (in French). 9 January 2026 – via allAfrica.
- "Ile Maurice: Bancoult veut faire entendre «la vraie voix» de la communauté à Londres". L'Express (in French). 28 April 2026 – via allAfrica.
- "Décorés de la République 2024 : and the winners are…". L'Express (in French). 12 March 2024.
- Edouard, Olivia (9 February 2023). "Le Groupe réfugiés Chagos, Olivier Bancoult et Liseby Élysé candidats au Prix Nobel de la Paix". L'Express (in French).
- Winfield, Nicole (23 August 2025). "Pope affirms right of people to return home after unjust exile in meeting with Chagos refugees". Associated Press.
- "Thousands of Chagossians would leave Crawley for homeland, says community leader". Sussex Express. 27 April 2016.
