= Federal Tort Claims Act =

United States law

Federal Tort Claims Act of 1946
- Long title: Title IV of an Act “To provide for increased efficiency in the legislative branch of the Government”.
- Enacted by: the 79th United States Congress
- Effective: August 2, 1946; 80 years ago

Citations
- Public law: Pub. L. 79–601
- Statutes at Large: 60 Stat. 812 through 60 Stat. 852 (40 pages)

Legislative history
- Signed into law by President Harry S. Truman on August 2, 1946

United States Supreme Court cases
- Feres v. United States; Millbrook v. United States

The Federal Tort Claims Act (Note: ch. 646, Title IV, 60 Stat. 812, enacted August 2, 1946, codified at 28 U.S.C. ch. 171 and § 1346) (FTCA) is a United States federal statute that permits private parties to sue the U.S. government in federal court for most torts committed by persons acting on its behalf. It was passed and enacted as a part of the Legislative Reorganization Act of 1946.

== Limitations ==
Under the FTCA, "[T]he United States [is] liable ... in the same manner and to the same extent as a private individual under like circumstances, but [is not] liable for interest prior to judgment or for punitive damages." Federal courts have jurisdiction over such claims, but apply the law of the state "where the act or omission occurred". Thus, both federal and state law may impose limitations on liability. The FTCA exempts, among other things, claims based upon the performance of or failure to perform a "discretionary function or duty". The FTCA also exempts a number of intentional torts. However, the FTCA does not exempt intentional torts committed by "investigative or law enforcement officers", thus allowing individuals aggrieved by the actions of law enforcement officers to have their day in court. The Supreme Court affirmed this "law enforcement proviso" in Millbrook v. United States, where a federal prisoner was allowed to bring a claim against the U.S. for intentional torts committed by federal prison guards in the scope of their employment. Under the FTCA, a tort claim against the U.S. must be presented in writing to the appropriate federal agency within two years after the claim accrues, or it is time-barred.

Plaintiffs are also limited to a timeline for filing. Plaintiffs must file an initial administrative claim with the government agency in question within two years of the incident. Once the agency mails a response, the plaintiff then has six months to file the suit in federal court.

The Supreme Court of the United States has limited the application of the FTCA in cases involving the military. This is the Feres doctrine.

The FTCA is the "exclusive means by which a party may sue the United States for money damages ... in tort". Accordingly, an FTCA action "can be brought only in a United States District Court". Regarding the timing of filing, FTCA's § 2401(b) states that the action must be brought "within two years after the claim accrues," or "within six months after ... notice of final denial of the claim by the agency".

In January 2025, the Supreme Court granted certiorari in the case Martin v. United States, which seeks to address whether the discretionary function exception can prevent claims from arising under the law enforcement proviso. In June 2025, the Supreme Court held in a unanimous decision that the law enforcement proviso does not override the discretionary function exception, allowing the Martin case to proceed.

== History ==
The "Federal Tort Claims Act" was also previously the official short title passed by the Seventy-ninth Congress on August 2, 1946, as Title IV of the Legislative Reorganization Act, 60 Stat. 842, which was classified principally to chapter 20 (§§ 921, 922, 931–934, 941–946) of former Title 28, Judicial Code and Judiciary.

Title IV of the Legislative Reorganization Act of August 2, 1946 was substantially repealed and re-enacted as sections 1346 (b) and 2671 et seq. of Title 28 on June 25, 1948 (Tort Claims Procedure).

The Act was passed following the 1945 B-25 Empire State Building crash, where a bomber piloted in thick fog by Lieutenant Colonel William F. Smith, Jr., crashed into the north side of the Empire State Building. As NPR reported, "Eight months after the crash, the U.S. government offered money to families of the victims. Some accepted, but others initiated a lawsuit that resulted in landmark legislation. The Federal Tort Claims Act of 1946, for the first time, gave United States citizens the right to sue the federal government." Although the crash was not the initial catalyst for the bill, which had been pending in Congress for more than two decades, the statute was made retroactive to 1945 in order to allow victims of that crash to seek recovery.

The FTCA was amended by the Federal Employees Liability Reform and Tort Compensation Act of 1988, also known as the Westfall Act, following the Supreme Court's decision in Westfall v. Erwin (1988), in which the Court found a federal employee liable for negligence in the performance of their duties. The 1988 act amended the FTCA to make federal employees immune from tort lawsuits arising from negligence or omission in their duties, and make the U.S. government the defending party under the FTCA, allowing the litigant to seek damages for non-constitutional violations.

On February 24, 2026, the Supreme Court ruled 5-4 in United States Postal Service v. Konan that Americans cannot sue the U.S. Postal Service even when it is found that employees deliberately refused to deliver their mail, with the majority opinion stating that the FTCA provision that "generally" shields the Postal Service from lawsuits over missing, lost or undelivered mail includes "the intentional nondelivery of mail."

== Examples ==
In 2020, a protester in Portland, Oregon, was hit in the forehead with an impact munition fired by a U.S. marshal during the George Floyd protests. The protester filed a federal suit for excessive force, but it was dismissed by U.S. District Court Judge Michael Mosman, who stated that the protester could still seek damages under the FTCA.

In 2022, a Navy sailor successfully sued under the act after being hit by a vehicle driven by an active-duty military member and received a $493,000 settlement.

In 2019, Hencely, wounded in a 2016 suicide bombing while serving at a U.S. military base in Afghanistan, sued Fluor Corporation, the government contractor that had employed the bomber (a subcontractor), under state law. The U.S. Court of Appeals for the Fourth Circuit affirmed the lower court's dismissal and held that the FTCA bars suits against the government for claims arising from the military's combat activities during wartime. The case is pending at the U.S. Supreme Court.

In 2025, immigration enforcement observer Marimar Martinez was shot five times in her vehicle by U.S. Border Patrol agent Charles Exum in Chicago, Illinois. The Department of Homeland Security initially claimed that Martinez was blocking Border Patrol agents and that she attempted to ram agents with her vehicle before Exum shot her. Martinez, who survived the shooting, was charged with assaulting federal officers, but charges were dropped when text messages sent by Exum and bodycam footage of the incident contradicted the government's account. After judge Georgia N. Alexakis authorized the release of further sealed evidence from the case, Martinez's legal team announced they would pursue an FTCA complaint against Homeland Security and Exum.

== See also ==
- Texas City Disaster (1947), which was the first failed lawsuit using the FTCA.
- United States v. Stanley (1987)
- United States Court of Claims
- United States Court of Federal Claims
