= Misley Mandarin =

British Chagossian activist

Interim First Minister of the Chagossian Government-in-Exile (Note: Title conferred by a poll organised by the Great British PAC; see Recognition.)
- Incumbent
- Assumed office 16 December 2025
- Preceded by: Position established

Personal details
- Born: Louis Misley Mandarin; 1978 or 1979 (age 47–48) Mauritius
- Citizenship: British
- Occupation: Former soldier; bus driver

Louis Misley Mandarin (born c. 1978/1979) is a Chagossian activist who opposes the transfer of the Chagos Archipelago to Mauritius. He is the founder of BIOT Citizens, a group of Chagossians in England. His title of interim "first minister" of a Chagossian government-in-exile, the Chagossian Government-in-Exile, which seeks to keep the islands British, was conferred in December 2025 by a poll of Chagossians organised by the Great British PAC, a British political pressure group. Asked in Parliament whether the British government recognised the government-in-exile, a Foreign Office minister said that he was not familiar with it "in any great detail"; the Mauritian Attorney General contested its legitimacy, and Olivier Bancoult of the Chagos Refugees Group has said that neither the British nor the Mauritian government recognises Mandarin as first minister. In February 2026 he led four Chagossians, among them his father, who landed without permits on Île du Coin in the Peros Banhos atoll of the British Indian Ocean Territory (BIOT) to establish a permanent settlement. The voyage was backed by the Great British PAC, and The Independent reported that it was funded by the Reform UK donor Christopher Harborne. In October 2026 Reform UK released a statement from him saying that the Conservatives "cannot be trusted by the Chagos people".

When the territory's authorities issued removal notices, the group obtained an injunction from the BIOT Supreme Court, and on 31 March 2026 the court quashed the 2004 provision denying any right of abode in the territory, a decision stayed pending the government's appeal. With his father he also brought an unsuccessful High Court challenge to the British government's failure to consult Chagossians before agreeing the 2025 treaty with Mauritius. He has said that Chagossians are not Mauritians and were treated as second-class citizens in Mauritius, and has alleged that the transfer could expose the islands to Chinese pressure; the Mauritian government, which has criticised him, holds that Chagossians are an integral part of the Mauritian people and that the legal path to their return lies through Mauritius, and the Chagos Refugees Group has also opposed him. The British government called the landing an "irresponsible political stunt".

== Early life and career ==
Mandarin was born and brought up in Mauritius. His father, Michel Mandarin, was removed from the Chagos Islands at the age of 14, during the expulsion of the islanders in the late 1960s and early 1970s. He told Coda Story that he had always felt like a second-class citizen in Mauritius, with "no opportunity to progress".

He left Mauritius at the age of 22 and joined the British Army, in which he served as a cook; he later became a bus driver in south London. The former MP Adam Holloway, writing in The Spectator, described him as a bus driving instructor at Transport for London who left the job to join the voyage to the Chagos Islands. He is a British citizen.

== BIOT Citizens ==
Mandarin founded BIOT Citizens, a group of Chagossians in England, and has led it. In June 2024, after dozens of Chagossians who had obtained British passports arrived from Mauritius at Gatwick Airport and were given emergency shelter in a leisure centre in Crawley, he told the BBC, on behalf of the group, that families with children were in hotels and 52 single adults at the leisure centre, a figure the council disputed. He told ITV News that the local authorities "need to find us a place to go because we're going to be in the street", adding: "We feel we've been deported in the 60s and 70s, and history is repeating itself." In November 2024 Mandarin challenged Bancoult, in a live television debate, to show which of them had the support of native-born Chagossians, and their supporters gathered the next day at the Chagos Refugees Group centre in Pointe-aux-Sables. According to Le Mauricien, the descendants who demonstrated outside the British High Commission and then went to Pointe-aux-Sables, carrying BIOT flags and chanting that they had British passports and would remain British, were members of a group led in Britain by his sister Vanessa Calou and her brother; they said that they had been born in exile in Mauritius and that Mauritian nationality had been imposed on them. (Note: The chant, in Mauritian Creole, as reported by Le Mauricien: « Nou anvi res avek bann British. Nou ena paspor British. Nou pou res enn British nou » (translated: "We want to stay with the British. We have British passports. We will stay British"). The paper described the protesters as « les membres de BOT Citizen Platform animés par Vanessa Calou et son frère ».) After this tense meeting between native-born Chagossians and descendants, Mandarin, speaking for descendants who had chosen British nationality, said that most other descendants would make the same choice, citing their historical ties with the United Kingdom and the opportunities that British nationality offered.

Le Mauricien reported in February 2025 that BIOT Citizens had facilitated the settlement in England of Chagossian descendants from Mauritius. According to Le Défi Media, in March 2025 Mandarin announced in a Facebook Live that he was withdrawing from the campaign and would stop bringing people over to England, saying that he was disappointed by the conduct and ingratitude of some Chagossian descendants; he said that those who came to England should stay with relatives, and that he would concentrate on a pilot resettlement on the archipelago and on the annulment of the treaty. (Note: In Mauritian Creole: "Se enn bann rezon kifer mo pe aret fer dimounn vini" (translated: "That is one of the reasons why I am stopping bringing people over").) Bancoult said that Mandarin was running away from his responsibilities and had raised false hopes, calling him a "vendeur de rêves" (seller of dreams), and that Chagossian descendants had to complete their formalities before flying to England. In April 2025, described by Le Défi Media as the founder of BIOT Citizens, Mandarin said that no agreement could be concluded without consulting the Chagossians and that a referendum was necessary. Le Mauricien reported in May 2026 that Calou had taken part, alongside him, in demonstrations and mobilisation meetings of Chagossians opposed to Mauritian sovereignty before his departure for Île du Coin. On 14 February 2026, two days before the landing and in his absence, a meeting of BIOT Citizens members at a community centre in Crawley was led by his brother. In March 2026 Chagossians in London tried to deliver to the Mauritian diplomatic mission a letter addressed to the Mauritian prime minister, Navin Ramgoolam, signed by Mandarin as interim first minister, stating that they had not been consulted on the treaty and did not consent to any decision on the islands taken without them; according to Le Mauricien, the protesters said that the staff refused to accept it, that British police intervened, and that they finally left it in the mission's letterbox.

== Chagossian Government ==
In December 2025 the Great British Political Action Committee organised a poll asking Chagossians whether they should form a government-in-exile and appoint an interim first minister. According to The Telegraph, the committee asked Chagossians in the United Kingdom; around 1,300 responded and overwhelmingly backed both proposals, Mandarin was the only candidate, and the process was overseen by the polling firm Whitestone Insight. Friends of the British Overseas Territories, which reported that more than 1,000 Chagossians worldwide were eligible to vote, gave the results as 1,233 votes for and 108 against the formation of the government, and 1,326 for and 15 against Mandarin serving as interim first minister for one year while a charter was drafted and formal elections prepared.

=== Recognition ===
On 16 December 2025, in a Commons debate, Richard Tice of Reform UK asked whether the British government recognised "the Chagossian Government in exile"; the Foreign Office minister Hamish Falconer replied that there was "a range of views across the Chagossian community" and that he was "not familiar with the Government in exile in any great detail". Two days later the Mauritian Attorney General, Gavin Glover, contested the legitimacy of the government-in-exile in an official statement, which stressed that Chagossians are an integral part of the Mauritian people. In April 2026 Bancoult said that no one had supervised Mandarin's election and that no government, British or Mauritian, recognised him as first minister. (Note: Bancoult's words, as reported by L'Express: « Aucun gouvernement ne le reconnaît comme first minister, ni le gouvernement anglais ni le gouvernement mauricien ».) Press reports have called him "self-styled" (Coda Story), said that he "has proclaimed himself" first minister (AFP), and described him as autoproclamé (self-proclaimed; L'Express and Radio One), while The Telegraph and The Independent described him as elected.

In his inaugural speech he said: "Let the world know: we remain loyal subjects of His Majesty." He argued that Chagossians should have the same right to self-determination as the people of other overseas territories, and said that they wished to return to the islands as British citizens under British sovereignty and to protect Diego Garcia and the Western security arrangements that depend on it. In a later interview he said: "We don't want to cut any links with Britain. We're not looking for independence." He has argued that Britain, not Mauritius, should make reparation to the Chagossians: "if Britain did the wrongs, Britain should have to repair the wrongs — not kick the can to Mauritius". In a letter to Starmer and the Foreign Secretary, Yvette Cooper, in December 2025, he asked the British government to suspend ratification of the treaty and to hold a referendum open to all Chagossians; according to L'Express, he warned that it would be unjust to repeat, sixty years after 1965, the historic error of a choice of sovereignty made without consulting the people. (Note: As reported by L'Express: « il serait injuste de répéter, 60 ans après 1965, l'erreur historique d'un choix de souveraineté sans consultation populaire ».)

In January 2026 Mandarin called on the American president, Donald Trump, to block the agreement between the United Kingdom and Mauritius. The Mauritian Attorney General, Gavin Glover, described the request as far-fetched and said that those Chagossians in London who sought to make Mauritius lose sovereignty were clearly not patriots. (Note: Glover's words, in the French of Le Défi Media: « Ce sont des personnes qui ne sont clairement pas des patriotes ».)

== Challenge to the 2025 treaty ==
On 24 June 2025 Mandarin and his father issued a claim for judicial review against the Foreign Secretary, heard together with a similar claim by Bertrice Pompe, a Chagossian born on Diego Garcia. They argued that the government had acted unlawfully in failing to consult Chagossians before agreeing to transfer sovereignty over the archipelago to Mauritius under the treaty signed on 22 May 2025. The government argued that the claims were "a collateral attack on an international agreement".

On 10 March 2026 Mrs Justice Stacey refused permission to apply for judicial review and dismissed the claims, holding that the Secretary of State had delivered "a clear knock out blow" to each element of them. She held that the claims were in substance a challenge to the prerogative power to make treaties, and that the treaty took away no existing rights, since "the Chagossians have never had any right of abode or settlement on the Islands since their ancestors were first brought there". The claimants' lawyers said they intended to challenge the decision in the Court of Appeal. Mandarin said, in a statement on the Great British PAC's Facebook page reported by Radio One, that they had lost a battle but that the war went on. (Note: « Nous avons perdu une bataille, mais la guerre continue », as reported by Radio One.)

== Landing on Île du Coin ==
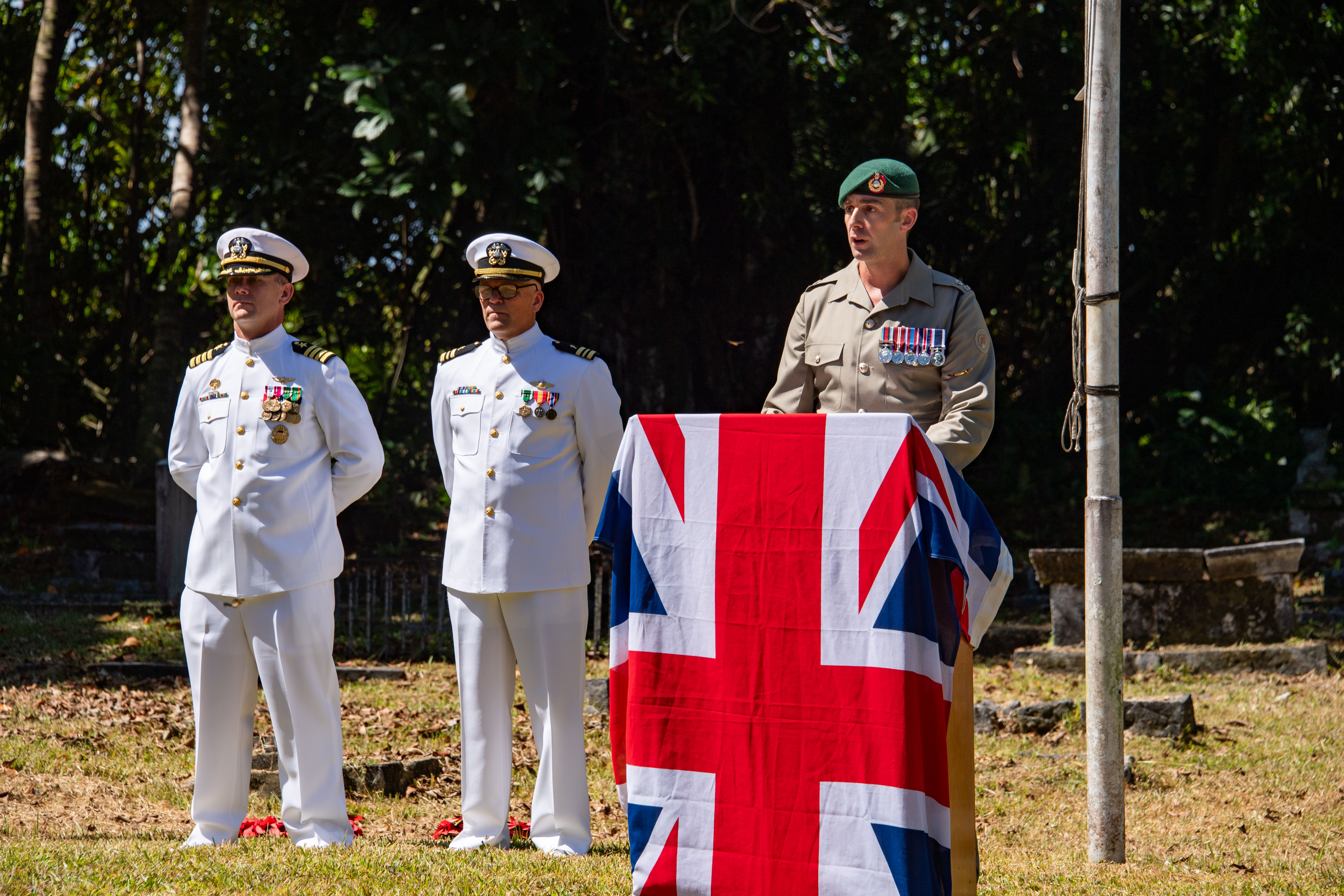
Royal Marines Major Pete Goddard in November 2025. As Acting Principal Immigration Officer of the BIOT, he issued removal notices to Mandarin and the other three claimants on 18 February 2026.

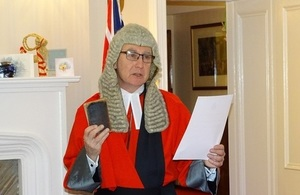
James Lewis, Chief Justice of the BIOT, granted the claimants an interim injunction against their removal on 19 February 2026.

=== Voyage and landing ===
Mandarin, his father, Antoine Lemettre and Guy Castel landed on Île du Coin, in the Peros Banhos atoll, on 16 February 2026, intending to establish a permanent settlement. They were accompanied by Holloway, a former Conservative MP who had joined Reform UK. According to Holloway, the voyage had been planned in secret: the group bought a boat in Thailand, provisioned it in Sri Lanka, and sailed for five days from Galle to the archipelago, entering the British exclusion zone. On landing Mandarin said: "I am not in exile any more. This is my homeland." He told AFP: "The UK is handing away my homeland to Mauritius. That's the reason why we're here."

Mandarin said that they were living in tents and expected further arrivals, and that he wanted to make it possible for the 322 people who, he said, had been born on the island and were still alive "to come home before they die". He sought to reassure the United States that the settlement posed no threat to its military base on Diego Garcia, but also warned that Mauritius, which he described as an ally of China, could endanger the base's operation. According to Le Défi Media, he said that he had already appointed two Chagossian women as immigration officers for the islands and had had entry and exit visa stickers printed. By March two more Chagossians had joined the group.

=== Funding and backers ===
According to BBC News, the group was backed by the Great British PAC, which it described as "a right-wing British political pressure group", and the trip was funded by donations organised by that group. The Independent reported that the return was funded by "Reform's biggest donor, the Thailand based crypto billionaire Christopher Harborne". Coda Story reported that the yacht that brought the group, and which carried supplies back and forth, was paid for by Harborne, whom it described as a "British-Thai businessman" and "a mega-donor to Reform". Le Mauricien, citing the Financial Times, reported that Harborne had pledged to help fund the creation of a new community on the islands. According to The Telegraph's Robert Mendick, who travelled on a resupply voyage, the venture was overseen by Holloway and funded by "three secretive billionaires", including the purchase of a $2.5 million yacht. Holloway wrote that he had found "several philanthropists" to fund the provisions. Asked whether he was being used by Reform UK, Mandarin said he had also approached the Green Party, which did not reply: "Only Reform responded. At the end of the day, it's politics." The Reform UK leader, Nigel Farage, tried and failed to join the group on the island. The Mauritian broadcaster Radio One described the Great British PAC as a British far-right organisation, and reported that it had launched an online fundraiser for a judicial review to stop the treaty. By mid-March 2026, according to Radio One, three online fundraisers had been set up in three weeks to support the legal proceedings and the BIOT Citizens movement through the Great British PAC, including one to finance Mandarin's voyage.

=== Removal notices and injunction ===
On 18 February 2026 the territory's Acting Principal Immigration Officer issued removal notices to the four men under section 12 of the British Indian Ocean Territory (Immigration) Order 2004, warning that they could face fines or imprisonment if they did not leave. Mandarin told the BBC that the British would have to "drag me from my beach", and appealed to the prime minister, Keir Starmer: "Keir Starmer, you could be a hero right now - don't ratify that deal". The same day Trump urged Starmer, on Truth Social, not to "give away Diego Garcia".

On 19 February 2026, on an out-of-hours application by the group's lawyer James Tumbridge, the Chief Justice of the BIOT, James Lewis KC, granted an interim injunction preventing their removal. He held that "There is no doubt the balance of convenience falls on the side of the claimants", who were 120 miles from Diego Garcia and posed no threat to national security on the evidence before him. Mandarin said that they had come "peacefully, respectfully, and without threat to anyone".

=== Reactions to the landing ===
Glover called the landing "clearly a publicity stunt" and said that Mauritius had made a solemn commitment to return the Chagossians to their homeland. He also called it a stunt "organised to create a situation of conflict with the British government". The Foreign, Commonwealth and Development Office said that it was working with Mauritius to resume heritage visits and that "This kind of illegal, unsafe stunt is not the way to achieve that", adding that the vessel posed no security risk to Diego Garcia. Le Mauricien noted that the first reports of the landing came only from the group's own online communications.

== BIOT Supreme Court case ==
Mandarin was the first of the four claimants in the judicial review brought against the Commissioner for the British Indian Ocean Territory, challenging the failure to grant them permits to enter and remain in the territory and the decision to issue the removal notices. The Commissioner dismissed their appeal against the notices on 25 February 2026, and the claim was heard on 13 March 2026. The Independent reported his statement to the court: "We have long wanted to return, and we had sought permits to visit, but no one answered us, so we have come here to prove we would still like to return."

In a judgment of 31 March 2026 the Chief Justice quashed section 9 of the British Indian Ocean Territory (Constitution) Order 2004, which provides that no person has the right of abode in the territory, and declared it "unlawful and/or Wednesbury unreasonable, especially in light of the current circumstances". He also quashed the removal notices, which were to be redetermined by a fair procedure including the claimants' representations. At the same time he held that the claimants had entered and were staying on Île du Coin illegally, without permits, that the permit requirement remained valid, and that "Nothing in this decision creates a right for the Claimants to set up a permanent camp on the Ile du Coin without the necessary permits."

Mandarin said: "Today justice has finally begun to catch up with history." The Foreign Office said that it did not agree with the judgment, and that it considered the arrival of "the Mandarin Group" on the island "an irresponsible political stunt that has wasted tax-payers' money and put people's lives at risk". The Mauritian Attorney General, Glover, said that the judgment did not mean that they had the right to stay and confirmed that they were there illegally. (Note: Glover's words, as reported by L'Express: « Le juge est très clair : ce jugement ne signifie pas qu'ils ont le droit de rester. Il confirme qu'ils sont dans l'illégalité ».) The court granted the Commissioner permission to appeal, stayed the effect of its declaration and quashing orders pending the appeal, and continued the injunction against removal. The appeal was listed before the British Indian Ocean Territory Court of Appeal for 15–17 July 2026. Human Rights Watch was given permission to make written submissions. Self-determination was at the centre of the hearing, held in London on those dates; Mandarin said: "If self-determination is a human right for every other people on Earth, then it must be a human right for the Chagossians too." L'Express set out the opposing reading of international law, based on the International Court of Justice's 2019 advisory opinion, under which the right of self-determination belongs to the people of Mauritius as a whole, of whom the Chagossians are part. The court reserved judgment, and on 4 November 2026 gave notice that it would be handed down on 12 November.

== Later developments ==
The treaty with Mauritius, the Agreement concerning the Chagos Archipelago including Diego Garcia, had not entered into force by November 2026. In April 2026 the British government told Parliament that the bill to implement it could not complete its passage before the end of the parliamentary session, and in September the prime minister, Andy Burnham, said that the United Kingdom would work with Mauritius and the United States on a way forward. On 23 October the House of Lords gave a second reading to a private member's bill introduced by Lord Weir of Ballyholme, which would restrict any transfer of sovereignty "without the approval of Parliament and without the consent of the Chagossian people"; the government opposed it, rejecting "the Bill's call for a referendum". Al Jazeera described Mandarin in October 2026 as a "UK-based second-generation Chagossian" whose supporters favour resettlement under British rather than Mauritian sovereignty and have received backing from Reform UK.

In March 2026, on Palm Sunday, Mandarin compared the history of the Chagossians, in a video posted on his Facebook page from Île du Coin, to that of Jesus facing adversity and judgement. In April he wrote to Cooper about a project, conducted with Swiss firms and the Great British PAC, to set up a DNA database of the Chagossian people; according to Le Défi Media, the letter said that in Mauritius some people without legitimate heritage sought to claim Chagossian status in order to obtain British passports and residence in the United Kingdom. In June 2026 the Chagos Refugees Group said that its delegation, led by Bancoult, had been confronted inside the British Parliament by opponents, among them Holloway; in a video Mandarin rejected the allegation that the BIOT Chagossians had been aggressive, saying that it was Bancoult's delegation that had behaved aggressively. In September 2026 the group was still on Île du Coin, now six people after two more Chagossians had joined the original four; Holloway had left. In a live video that month Mandarin said that the struggle would be long, and Radio One reported that the group intended to camp there for another 18 months. (Note: Mandarin's words, as reported by Radio One: « La lutte sera longue pour que les British Indian Ocean Territory Citizens remportent la victoire ».)

== Relations with UK political parties ==
In October 2026 the Conservative leader, Kemi Badenoch, and Farage clashed after Farage told a US podcast that he would have given Trump the Diego Garcia base "in perpetuity" in return for the United States staying out of debate over the sovereignty of the Falkland Islands; the Conservatives demanded that Farage apologise, and Reform UK said that Badenoch had mischaracterised his remarks. During the dispute Reform UK released a statement from Mandarin, whom the Press Association described as the "self-proclaimed interim first minister of the unrecognised Chagossian government", saying that the Conservatives "cannot be trusted by the Chagos people". He asked: "If they really have interest in the Chagos, why would you have started negotiating about things you already own?", and said: "We know Nigel has the Chagossians at heart." He added that Chagossians would be happy for the United States to keep using Diego Garcia "with a British Chagossian population in perpetuity", with the rest of the archipelago under the Crown.

Several Chagossians stood for Reform UK in the English local elections of 7 May 2026; Le Mauricien reported four Chagossian candidates for the party, among them Mandarin's sister, Vanessa Calou, and his brother, Steve Mandarin. Calou stood in the Addiscombe East ward of Croydon Council; she received 437 votes, ninth of ten candidates for two seats, and was not elected. Steve Mandarin, a candidate in Figge's Marsh ward in Merton, was defeated, as was another Chagossian Reform candidate in Ealing. Marie Wendy Mariette, described by Le Mauricien as being of Chagossian origin and by herself as a "British Chagossian", won the Broadfield ward of Crawley Borough Council for Reform UK with 980 votes, a gain from Labour; standing at the same time for the Broadfield division of West Sussex County Council, she lost to the Labour candidate by one vote, 1,142 to 1,143.

== Views on Mauritius ==
Mandarin rejects a Mauritian identity for the Chagossians. In an article for The Telegraph in February 2026 he wrote: "We are not Mauritians. Mauritius has no legitimate claim or ties to our islands." He wrote that Chagossians did not want the islands "to be given to Mauritius as its new colony", and that they held British passports, had paid British taxes and had served in the British armed forces. In November 2024 he had told Le Défi Media that Mauritian sovereignty over the archipelago could make Chagossian descendants foreigners both in Mauritius and in the Chagos, adding: "We are not Mauritian patriots" (translated). (Note: As reported by Le Défi Media: « Si Maurice obtient la souveraineté sur les Chagos, cela pourrait signifier que nous deviendrons des étrangers, aussi bien à Maurice que sur les Chagos, vu que ce sera un territoire mauricien. Nous ne sommes pas des patriotes mauriciens. ») The Mauritian government's statement of December 2025 stressed that Chagossians are an integral part of the Mauritian people. Bancoult said in February 2026 that Chagossians' births and marriages are registered in Mauritius and that it could not be said that Chagossians had no link with Mauritius. In its 2019 advisory opinion, the International Court of Justice found that the detachment of the archipelago from Mauritius in 1965 "was not based on the free and genuine expression of the will of the people concerned".

He has said that Chagossians were badly treated in Mauritius, telling The Telegraph: "They treated us so badly, like second class citizens. They kept us out of education", and saying that they had been called by a racial slur (Ilois). In a November 2024 interview with Le Défi Quotidien he said that Chagossians and their descendants in Mauritius had been rejected for more than 50 years, and that British naturalisation and passports were for them symbols of a recognition and belonging denied to them elsewhere. (Note: As reported by Le Défi Media: « Les Chagossiens et leurs descendants à Maurice ont été rejetés pendant plus de 50 ans »; and « des symboles d'une reconnaissance et d'une appartenance qui leur auraient été refusées ailleurs ».) Some Chagossians opposed to the treaty have accused Mauritius of decades of neglect, an accusation Mauritius has denied.

After the landing, L'Express reported that Mandarin wished to be recognised as British rather than Mauritian, going as far as to say that he wanted to give up his Mauritian rights, and that he proposed that only British Chagossians should settle on the islands, while Chagossians who chose to remain Mauritian could visit but not live there: "If a Mauritian Chagossian decides to come to the Chagos, he will have to make his choice" (translated). (Note: As reported by L'Express: « Si un Chagossien mauricien décide de venir aux Chagos, il devra faire son choix »; the paper wrote that he wished to be recognised as British rather than Mauritian, « allant jusqu'à déclarer vouloir renoncer à ses droits mauriciens ».) According to Glover, Mandarin has asked Chagossians to renounce their Mauritian nationality; in March 2026 Glover called this ridiculous and pathetic, and said that Mauritius would give Chagossians the right of return under article 6 of the treaty and that the legal path to return lay through Mauritius, not Britain. (Note: Glover's words, as reported by L'Express: « C'est le comble du ridicule et du pathétique » and « Le chemin légal pour le retour passe par Maurice, pas par la Grande-Bretagne ».) In June 2026, while a Chagossian delegation led by Bancoult was in London for talks on the transfer, Mandarin called in a Facebook video on supporters of the Chagos Refugees Group to give up their British passports, saying that it was inconsistent to travel on a British passport while campaigning for the return of the archipelago to Mauritius. Le Mauricien reported that many members of BIOT Citizens, particularly those who had arrived in England in the previous two years, did not wish to follow him in rejecting any attachment to Mauritius; some said that renouncing their Mauritian nationality would make them foreigners in Mauritius.

He has also presented the transfer as a security risk, describing Mauritius as an ally of China and writing that the transfer "risks exposing the islands to pressures from China". In the same article he gave Trump his "permission" to use Diego Garcia to strike Iran. Bancoult replied that Mandarin had no right to give consent on behalf of the Chagossians for the United States to attack Iran, and that the Chagossian people had always respected international law. The historian Jocelyn Chan Low, interviewed by Le Défi Media, said that Mandarin had no mandate and no legitimacy to make such a statement, and likened his intervention to that of "a real impostor" (translated). (Note: As reported by Le Défi Media: « un véritable imposteur »; and « Il n'est mandaté par personne, il n'a aucune légitimité pour faire une déclaration en ce genre ».) In January 2025 the Mauritian prime minister, Navin Ramgoolam, called for closer ties with China but said that he would not allow Beijing to take control of the islands.

In a video posted on social media from Île du Coin in March 2026, Mandarin said that the treaty was compromised and that the litigation over his settlement had delayed its ratification; Radio One reported the video under the headline that he claimed to have prevented Mauritius from obtaining Rs 10 billion for its next budget, and said that he had insulted the Republic of Mauritius and declared his allegiance to the British and the United States. (Note: Radio One's headline: « Mandarin dit avoir empêché Maurice d'obtenir Rs 10 mds pour son prochain budget »; and its report: « Il maintient son plaidoyer tout en insultant la République de Maurice et affiche son allégeance aux Britanniques et aux États-Unis ».)

== Criticism ==
Olivier Bancoult, leader of the Chagos Refugees Group, which supports the treaty, called Mandarin's appeal to Trump a "véritable trahison" (genuine betrayal) of the Chagossian people and of the Mauritian state, and asked under what authority Mandarin called himself first minister. After the landing in February 2026 Bancoult called it illegal and more of a communications operation than a structured resettlement project, said that Mandarin had no legitimacy on the archipelago because he was born in Mauritius, and claimed that the venture had been funded by the Conservative Party and Reform UK, which he said raised serious questions about its motives. In April 2026, besides questioning the legitimacy of Mandarin's election (see Recognition), he accused British opposition politicians, including Farage, of using Mandarin for their own careers, and said that, since the British government accepted Mauritian sovereignty, Mandarin could not claim to be "plus royaliste que le roi" (more royalist than the king). The constitutional lawyer Parvèz Dookhy told Le Défi Media that the landing appeared to be a manoeuvre of the British identitarian right, and that Mandarin appeared "more as a pawn, an agent, of the identitarian right than as an activist for the Chagossian cause" (translated). (Note: « Misley Mandarin apparaît davantage comme un pion, un agent, de la droite identitaire qu'un militant de la cause chagossienne ».)

The Chagossian diaspora, in the United Kingdom, Mauritius and the Seychelles, is divided over the treaty. According to Coda Story, his alliance with Reform UK provoked mixed feelings among Chagossians; one opponent of the treaty in Crawley asked: "He's put us back in the centre of the story, but will we be overshadowed by Reform's agenda?"

== See also ==
- Detachment of the Chagos Archipelago
- Expulsion of the Chagossians
- Chagos Archipelago sovereignty dispute
- Resettlement of Île du Coin

== Sources ==
=== Court decisions ===
- R (Pompe) v Secretary of State for Foreign, Commonwealth and Development Affairs; R (Mandarin) v Secretary of State for Foreign, Commonwealth and Development Affairs, EWHC (Admin) 529 (High Court 10 March 2026).
- R (Mandarin and others) v HM Commissioner for the British Indian Ocean Territory (Supreme Court of the British Indian Ocean Territory 31 March 2026), Text.
- R (Mandarin and others) v HM Commissioner for the British Indian Ocean Territory: Order (Supreme Court of the British Indian Ocean Territory 31 March 2026), Text.
- "Cause list, 15–17 July 2026: HM Commissioner for the British Indian Ocean Territory v The King (on the application of Mandarin & Ors), [2026] BIOT CA (Civ) 1" (PDF). British Indian Ocean Territory Court of Appeal. 2026.
- "Notice of judgment hand down: His Majesty's Commissioner for the British Indian Ocean Territory v The King (on the application of Mandarin & Ors), [2026] BIOT CA (Civ) 1" (PDF). British Indian Ocean Territory Court of Appeal. 4 November 2026.
- Legal Consequences of the Separation of the Chagos Archipelago from Mauritius in 1965, Advisory Opinion (PDF). I.C.J. Reports 2019. International Court of Justice. 25 February 2019. p. 95.

=== News and other sources ===
- AFP (18 February 2026). "Chagos islanders say they refuse to leave in protest against UK handover". Arab News.
- Arjanee, Ameerah (2 October 2026). "UK-Mauritius Chagos sovereignty deal stalls amid fears of further delays". Al Jazeera English.
- Badshah, Nadeem (17 February 2026). "Four Chagossians return to islands in attempt to stop British transfer to Mauritius". The Guardian.
- "Election of councillors to Croydon Council 2026 – Addiscombe East". Croydon Council. May 2026. Official declaration of results.
- "Deportation of Chagos Islanders blocked by judge". BBC News. 19 February 2026.
- "[En images] Pointe-aux-Sables : démonstration de force entre les sympathisants de Misley Mandarin et ceux d'Olivier Bancoult". Le Défi Media (in French). 27 November 2024.
- "Olivier Bancoult : « Une véritable trahison envers le peuple chagossien et l'État »". Le Défi Media (in French). 12 January 2026.
- "Déclaration de Misley Mandarin en faveur de frappes contre l'Iran : depuis Peros Banhos, un «feu vert» lourd de conséquences géopolitiques". Le Défi Media (in French). 27 February 2026.
- "Misley Mandarin souhaite des tests ADN pour recenser les «vrais» Chagossiens". Le Défi Media (in French). 16 April 2026.
- Dunn, Karen (21 April 2026). "Crawley elections 2026: Meet the Reform candidates". SussexWorld. Local Democracy Reporting Service.
- Dunn, Karen (8 May 2026). "Crawley elections 2026: Banner day for Reform UK at they claim ten seats on borough council". SussexWorld. Local Democracy Reporting Service.
- "Chagossians announce Government-in-Exile". Friends of the British Overseas Territories. 16 December 2025. Advocacy charity; cited only, with attribution, for the poll figures it published.
- "Chagossians: Trust Fund and Resettlement". Hansard, House of Commons. 16 December 2025.
- "British Sovereignty Protection (Chagos Islands) Bill [HL]". Hansard, House of Lords. 23 October 2026.
- Hilbert, Patrick (21 February 2026). "Parvèz Dookhy : «Misley Mandarin apparaît davantage comme un pion de la droite identitaire…»". Le Défi Media (in French).
- Holloway, Adam (18 February 2026). "Why I helped invade the Chagos Islands". The Spectator. First-person account by a participant; cited with attribution.
- "Dozens of displaced Chagos islanders offered UK citizenship sleeping on Crawley leisure centre floor". ITV News Meridian. 14 June 2024. Archived from the original on 4 October 2024.
- Judoobar, Bryan (16 September 2026). "Peros Banhos : Mandarin et ses quatre acolytes comptent camper pendant encore 18 mois". Radio One (in French).
- "Chagos : la décision de la Cour d'appel britannique mise en délibéré". Outre-mer La 1ère (in French). France Télévisions. 21 July 2026.
- Lateef, Samaan (21 January 2025). "Mauritius PM calls for closer ties with China, but insists he won't let Beijing take Chagos Islands". The Daily Telegraph.
- "Avec Passeport Britannique : Des Chagossiens placés dans un abri d'urgence à Londres". Le Mauricien (in French). 14 June 2024.
- "À Pointe-aux-Sables : les « natifs » du Chagos tiennent tête à la BOT Citizen Platform". Le Mauricien (in French). 28 November 2024.
- "Descendante chagossienne Nadia raconte le début de sa nouvelle vie en Angleterre". Le Mauricien (in French). 16 February 2025.
- "Chagos : un groupe affirme avoir débarqué à Peros Banhos pour s'y installer durablement". Le Mauricien (in French). 17 February 2026.
- "Pendant que Misley Mandarin occupe l'île du Coin (Peros Banhos) : De Crawley à Hillingdon, l'opinion est divisée". Le Mauricien (in French). 24 February 2026.
- "Océan Indien — Souveraineté et décolonisation : Des Crypto-Currencies financent la campagne anti-Chagos Deal". Le Mauricien (in French). 1 April 2026.
- "Chagos : la revendication maldivienne ouvre un nouveau front diplomatique". Le Mauricien (in French). 14 September 2026.
- "Chagos : Lettre de non-consentement et manifestation à Londres". Le Mauricien (in French). 15 March 2026.
- "Élections locales du 7 mai au Royaume-Uni : Deux candidates d'origine chagossienne pour défendre la politique de Farage". Le Mauricien (in French). 4 May 2026.
- "Élections locales au Royaume-Uni : La Chagossienne Wendy Mariette élue conseillère à Broadfield". Le Mauricien (in French). 10 May 2026.
- "Ile Maurice: Bancoult veut faire entendre «la vraie voix» de la communauté à Londres". L'Express (in French). 28 April 2026 – via allAfrica.
- Limbeea Ragaven, Jessila (28 November 2024). "Réunion tendue entre natifs et descendants chagossiens à Pointe-aux-Sables : Misley Mandarin estime que la majorité des descendants opteront pour la nationalité britannique". Radio One (in French).
- Limbeea Ragaven, Jessila (18 February 2026). "Chagos : Bancoult pointe du doigt les excès de Miseley Mandarin". Radio One (in French).
- Limbeea Ragaven, Jessila (19 February 2026). "Chagos : L'extrême droite britannique apporte son soutien à Mandarin". Radio One (in French).
- Limbeea Ragaven, Jessila (27 February 2026). "Iran : Olivier Bancoult se dissocie des propos de Misley Mandarin". Radio One (in French).
- Limbeea Ragaven, Jessila (16 March 2026). "De Peros Banhos : Mandarin dit avoir empêché Maurice d'obtenir Rs 10 mds pour son prochain budget". Radio One (in French).
- Limbeea Ragaven, Jessila (2 June 2026). "Rétrocession : Mandarin appelle les soutiens du Groupe Réfugié Chagos à renoncer au passeport britannique". Radio One (in French).
- Limbeea Ragaven, Jessila (11 March 2026). "Demande de révision judiciaire : Misley Mandarin fera appel de la décision de la Haute Cour de Londres". Radio One (in French).
- Limbeea Ragaven, Jessila (30 March 2026). "Dimanche des Rameaux : Mandarin compare le destin des Chagossiens à celui de Jésus". Radio One (in French).
- Lukiv, Jaroslav (18 February 2026). "Do not give away Diego Garcia, Trump tells UK in fresh attack on Chagos deal". BBC News.
- Lynch, David; Ng, Ellie (14 October 2026). "Badenoch and Farage both dig in amid row over Falklands-Chagos 'trade' proposal". Nation.Cymru. PA Media.
- Maddox, David (20 February 2026). "Starmer's Chagos Islands deal hits new crisis after judge blocks removal of islanders". The Independent.
- Maddox, David (25 February 2026). "Was this the week Starmer's Chagos deal finally died?". The Independent.
- Maddox, David; Devlin, Kate (31 March 2026). "Starmer's Chagos deal dealt major blow as judge rules Chagossians have right to live on disputed islands". The Independent.
- Mallinder, Lorraine (10 March 2026). "The Belongers: What the Chagos Islands tells us about the new world order". Coda Story.
- Mandarin, Misley (25 February 2026). "We've returned to Chagos – and this time we are not going anywhere". The Telegraph – via Yahoo News. Opinion article by the subject; cited only for his own views, with attribution.
- Martin, Daniel (16 December 2025). "Chagos Islanders defy Starmer by forming government in exile". The Telegraph. Archived from the original on 17 December 2025.
- Mendick, Robert (28 February 2026). "My 72-hour ocean odyssey to meet the Chagos Islanders who made it home". The Telegraph – via Yahoo News.
- Nuckchhed, Vashish (25 December 2025). "Chagos : «Il serait injuste de répéter l'erreur de 1965», plaide Misley Mandarin". L'Express (in French).
- Nuckchhed, Vashish (19 February 2026). "Chagos : Le «retour symbolique» de Misley Mandarin, «First Minister», en exil fait polémique". L'Express (in French).
- Nuckchhed, Vashish (11 March 2026). "Ile Maurice: La Haute Cour bloque une contestation de l'accord Londres-Maurice". L'Express (in French) – via allAfrica.
- Nuckchhed, Vashish (21 February 2026). "Chagos Deal : Tempête géopolitique : Maurice «dommage collatéral» du clash UK–USA". L'Express (in French).
- Nuckchhed, Vashish (1 April 2026). "Séjour illégal sur l'île du Coin : «Sursis» pour Misley Mandarin et les trois autres". L'Express (in French).
- Nuckchhed, Vashish (5 June 2026). "Dossier Chagos : Mission diplomatique mouvementée pour Olivier Bancoult à Londres". L'Express (in French).
- Nuckchhed, Vashish (8 July 2026). "Chagos : Andy Burnham prêt à poursuivre l'accord avec Maurice". L'Express (in French).
- Nuckchhed, Vashish (17 July 2026). "Chagos : L'autodétermination au cœur des débats devant la Cour d'appel". L'Express (in French).
- Ouitona, Maceo (19 December 2025). "Chagos : Port-Louis face à la fronde du « gouvernement en exil »". Afrik.com (in French).
- Parke, Callum (28 October 2025). "Government made 'unlawful decisions' over Chagos Islands, High Court told". The Irish News. PA Media.
- "UK court rejects challenge to Chagos Islands deal". Business Day. Reuters. 10 March 2026.
- Shreedam, Keshav (18 February 2026). "Ile Maurice: Quatre exilés brisent la zone d'exclusion et veulent reprendre Peros Banhos". L'Express (in French) – via allAfrica.
- Stacey, Kiran (5 November 2026). "Burnham wants to 'recast' Chagos Islands deal after US resistance". The Guardian.
- "Four islanders land on remote Chagos atoll, hope to block UK-Mauritius deal". The Straits Times. Reuters. 18 February 2026.
- Sungeelee, Alwin (18 February 2026). "Misley Mandarin, l'homme qui défie les autorités aux Chagos". Le Défi Media (in French).
- Thomas, Fernando (29 November 2024). "Chagos : deux visions irréconciliables au cœur du malaise". Le Défi Media (in French).
- Thomas, Fernando (6 March 2025). "«Manque de reconnaissance» de certains descendants de Chagossiens : déçu, Misley Mandarin, du groupe BIOT Citizens, jette l'éponge". Le Défi Media (in French).
- Thomas, Fernando (3 April 2025). "Accord sur les Chagos : Londres réaffirme son engagement, mais la diaspora reste divisée". Le Défi Media (in French).
- "British Sovereignty Protection (Chagos Islands) Bill [HL]: Stages". UK Parliament.
