= R (Mandarin) v Commissioner for the British Indian Ocean Territory =

2026 judicial review in the British Indian Ocean Territory

- Court: Supreme Court of the British Indian Ocean Territory
- Full case name: The King, on the application of (1) Louis Misley Mandarin (2) Louis Michel Mandarin (3) Louis Antoine Lemettre (4) Guy Shane Adrien Castel v His Majesty's Commissioner for the British Indian Ocean Territory
- Decided: 31 March 2026

Case history
- Prior actions: Interim injunction against removal, 19 February 2026
- Subsequent actions: Permission to appeal granted and effect of the decision stayed pending appeal (31 March 2026); appeal heard by the British Indian Ocean Territory Court of Appeal, [2026] BIOT CA (Civ) 1, on 15–17 July 2026; judgment to be handed down on 12 November 2026

Court membership
- Judges sitting: James Lewis KC, Chief Justice

Keywords
- Judicial review; royal prerogative; right of abode; Chagossians; procedural fairness; Wednesbury unreasonableness

R (Mandarin) v Commissioner for the British Indian Ocean Territory is a 2026 judicial review case in the Supreme Court of the British Indian Ocean Territory (BIOT), brought by four Chagossians who landed without permits on Île du Coin, in the Peros Banhos atoll, on 16 February 2026. They challenged removal notices served on them two days later and the failure to grant them permits to enter and remain in the territory. The court granted an interim injunction against their removal on 19 February 2026.

In a judgment of 31 March 2026 the Chief Justice, James Lewis KC, held that the court had jurisdiction to review the territory's 2004 constitution, and quashed its section 9, which provides that "no person has the right of abode in the Territory", as "an unlawful and irrational exercise of the prerogative". He preferred the reasoning of the dissenting minority in the House of Lords' 2008 decision in Bancoult (No 2), and held that the 2025 treaty between the United Kingdom and Mauritius had removed the defence and cost reasons on which the majority had relied. He also quashed the removal notices as procedurally unfair, but held that the claimants had entered and remained in the territory illegally, that the immigration permit system remained valid, and that the claimants had "at least in part" misled the court.

The court granted the Commissioner permission to appeal and ordered that the effects of the declaration and quashing orders be stayed pending the final determination of the appeal; the interim injunction was continued. The British Indian Ocean Territory Court of Appeal heard the appeal on 15–17 July 2026 and reserved judgment; on 4 November it gave notice that judgment would be handed down on 12 November 2026.

== Background ==
The BIOT was created by Order in Council in 1965 from the Chagos Archipelago and islands previously administered from Mauritius and Seychelles, and in 1966 the islands were made available to the United States for defence purposes. The entire population was removed between 1966 and 1972, and no Chagossian has lived on the islands since 1973. Before the court the Commissioner expressly conceded that there had been a settled population in the islands by the 1960s, which the judge called "commendable".

The removal was carried out under the Immigration Ordinance 1971, which made it unlawful to enter or remain in the territory without a permit. In 2000, in Bancoult (No 1), the Divisional Court held that section 4 of that ordinance was outside the Commissioner's powers; the government did not appeal, and the Immigration Ordinance 2000 allowed Chagossians to enter and remain in the outer islands, though not Diego Garcia. On 10 June 2004 two Orders in Council, the British Indian Ocean Territory (Constitution) Order 2004 and the British Indian Ocean Territory (Immigration) Order 2004, reversed that position. Section 9(1) of the Constitution Order provides:

Whereas the Territory was constituted and is set aside to be available for the defence purposes of the Government of the United Kingdom and the Government of the United States of America, no person has the right of abode in the Territory.

Section 9(2) provides that no person is entitled to enter or be present in the territory except as authorised by law, and section 5 of the Immigration Order prohibits entry or presence without a permit. Under section 12 of the Immigration Order the Commissioner or the Principal Immigration Officer may order the removal of a person unlawfully present, and under section 10 a person aggrieved by an immigration officer's decision may appeal to the Commissioner, "whose decision shall be final and conclusive".

In Bancoult (No 2) the Divisional Court and the Court of Appeal held section 9 unlawful, but the House of Lords allowed the government's appeal by three to two: Lord Hoffmann, Lord Rodger and Lord Carswell held it lawful, and Lord Bingham and Lord Mance dissented. All five law lords accepted that the Constitution Order was open to judicial review on ordinary grounds of legality, rationality and procedural impropriety. In 2016 the Supreme Court refused, by a majority, to set aside the 2008 decision (Bancoult (No 4)); Lord Mance said there that "the background has shifted, and logically the constitutional ban needs to be revisited", and that any Chagossian could challenge the failure to abrogate the 2004 Orders in the light of a new feasibility study.

In 2019 the International Court of Justice advised that the decolonisation of Mauritius had not been lawfully completed (Chagos advisory opinion), and the General Assembly urged the United Kingdom to cooperate in the resettlement of Chagossians. The court noted that the General Assembly's resolution "has no direct legal effect in domestic law". On 22 May 2025 the United Kingdom and Mauritius signed a treaty on the archipelago; at the date of the judgment the implementing bill had not received Royal Assent. Article 6 of the treaty provides that "Mauritius is free to implement a programme of resettlement on the islands of the Chagos Archipelago other than Diego Garcia".

== Facts ==
=== The landing ===
On 16 February 2026 a yacht, the SY No Excuse, entered BIOT territorial waters without permission and travelled to Peros Banhos. The court found that all those on board knew they were entering the territory illegally, and that the yacht's Automatic Identification System had been switched off. There were nine people aboard: the four claimants, men of Chagossian origin "whose intention transpired to be to set up a permanent camp"; three mariners, Michael and Peter Broughton and Rachel Trevallion; the journalist Paul Wood, who later wrote about the voyage in The Spectator; and Adam Holloway, described in the judgment as a former Army officer and Conservative MP who is now a member of Reform UK. The judgment describes the camp as "well prepared and supplied", with Starlink communications. Île du Coin, which has an abandoned church, graves and derelict buildings, has a mooring for visiting yachts, which are usually given permits for stays of up to four weeks. (Note: The judgment places Île du Coin "roughly 135 miles north of Diego Garcia" (para. 1); the evidence of the Acting Principal Immigration Officer, summarised at para. 66, gives "some 120 miles".) The claimants said they had come in protest against the planned handover of the islands to Mauritius.

The claimants were Louis Misley Mandarin, who said he had been elected First Minister of the Chagossian Government-in-Exile in December 2025; his father Louis Michel Mandarin, born in the archipelago on 6 September 1953; Louis Antoine Lemettre, born in 1958 outside the archipelago; and Guy Shane Adrien Castel, aged 32, whose grandmother was born in the islands. In their evidence they gave their reasons as seeing their homeland, visiting and repairing ancestral graves, and protesting at the treatment of the Chagossians. Misley Mandarin said that Holloway had approached him in December 2025 and "swore me to secrecy", and that once they had arrived "we knew that we could make a home here and we want to stay".

=== Removal notices and later events ===
On 18 February 2026 the Acting Principal Immigration Officer, Peter Goddard, issued removal notices under section 12 of the Immigration Order to all the claimants, and notices were also served on the yacht's master. The only reason stated in the notices was that each claimant was "a person unlawfully present in the Territory". The same day the claimants' solicitors appealed to the Commissioner, asked for permits for the claimants to remain on the island, and sought an undertaking that they would not be removed pending any judicial review. The Commissioner dismissed the appeal on 25 February 2026.

On 21 February the yacht reached Gan in the Maldives, where Trevallion and Wood left it and six new people joined, "purportedly as crew". The judgment records media reports that Nigel Farage had flown to the Maldives intending to join the yacht, which did not happen, "perhaps owing to this Court's interim order that the Yacht could only be used for resupply". On 26 February the yacht returned to Île du Coin and unloaded supplies; two of the new crew went ashore and remained, apparently to the surprise of the yacht's master, while Holloway reboarded, and the yacht left, indicating that it would not return. On 2 March the Commissioner offered, subject to permission from the operator of the BIOT patrol vessel, that those on the island might be taken to Malé; the claimants did not take up the offer.

The yacht's owner and crew (the "Broughton claimants") were also served with removal notices and brought a parallel claim, which they later discontinued.

== Proceedings ==
=== Interim injunction ===
On 19 February 2026 the claimants applied out of hours for urgent interim relief, and the court granted an injunction preventing the execution of the removal orders until the judicial review could be determined. The interim decisions were given in separate judgments, which are not set out in the final judgment. According to a press release by the claimants' solicitors, Keystone Law, the Chief Justice found a serious issue to be tried and that the balance of convenience favoured the claimants, and restrained enforcement of the removal orders for seven days to allow the Commissioner to respond, the injunction to continue pending the judicial review if no response was made; the claimants undertook to issue a claim for judicial review within seven days if the Commissioner declined to take the decisions they had requested. The firm's partner James Tumbridge said that the judge had been "willing to take an urgent application and deal with it whilst flying over Africa".

=== Hearing and parties ===
The claim was brought against His Majesty's Commissioner for the British Indian Ocean Territory, Nishi Dholakia, who gave evidence alongside Goddard. The claimants were represented by Philip Rule KC, James Tumbridge and Susana Ferrín, instructed by Keystone Law; the Commissioner was represented by Marie Demetriou KC, William Irwin, Yaaser Vanderman and Emile Simpson, instructed by the Government Legal Department. The court granted counsel licence to appear as advocates of the bar of the territory for the proceedings.

The case was heard on 13 March 2026 as a "rolled-up" hearing, in which the questions of permission and the substantive claim were heard together; the judge granted permission and gave a final judgment. The claimants' grounds were the failure to grant a permit or allow any form of visit, unfairness in issuing the removal notices and in the appeal to the Commissioner, illegality on the ground that removal would involve a serious crime or discrimination, and breach of public law duties. They also argued that if section 9 of the Constitution Order prevented the grant of a permit or a decision not to remove them, it was unlawful in the present circumstances. The challenge to section 9 was pleaded in the claimants' reply; the Commissioner objected that it had not been in the original grounds, but the judge held that the issue had been sufficiently raised and argued.

=== The Commissioner's case ===
The Commissioner's defence opened with the argument that the claimants "appear to have deliberately misled the Commissioner and the Court as to their conduct, intentions and objectives", by presenting the urgent application as concerning a heritage visit when the trip had been planned for months to set up a permanent camp; he argued that this breach of the duty of candour alone justified refusing permission. He relied on media interviews in which the claimants and Holloway said that they intended to stay permanently and that the voyage had been made covertly. His evidence described Île du Coin as uninhabited since 1971 and without infrastructure, safe water or medical facilities; he regarded a permanent camp as a serious risk to life and health, particularly for the two elderly members of the group, and raised concerns about the marine protected area, diversion of the patrol vessel, and the risk that unauthorised landings might encourage further voyages and be exploited by hostile actors near Diego Garcia.

On the grounds, the Commissioner argued that no application for a permit had ever been made, the October 2025 emails being only general enquiries; that he was not required to hear the claimants before issuing the notices, or that it would have been impractical and pointless to do so; that the claimants' appeal had stated no grounds; and that the illegality ground was "hopeless" because unincorporated treaties are not part of domestic law. He argued that the defence purposes recited in section 9(1) give context but do not condition the provision, relying on Lord Hoffmann's statement in Bancoult (No 2) that its language "could hardly be clearer". On section 9 itself he argued that any challenge had to be brought against the Foreign Secretary in the High Court of England and Wales, the Commissioner being bound by the Order and not responsible for it, and that the claim raised nothing new and should fail for the reasons given by the majority in Bancoult (No 2). He declined the claimants' proposal to join the Foreign Secretary as a defendant or interested party.

== Judgment ==
The judgment was given by Lewis CJ on 31 March 2026. He began his analysis by observing that "Neither party comes out well in this matter."

=== Candour and criticism of both parties ===
The judge accepted the Commissioner's complaint of a lack of candour: "There is no doubt the court was misled about the true nature of the trip", and "A breach of candour should not be condoned." Given the importance of the issues, however, he held that "it would not be right to dismiss them on this preliminary ground". He found that the claimants "took the law into their own hands" and that their entry was deliberate and planned, that "The Claimants (not their lawyers), at least in part, misled the court" when seeking urgent relief, and that "This Court does not, and cannot, condone their illegal entry into the Territory."

He was also critical of the authorities. Heritage visits, held in ten years between 2006 and 2019, had stopped in 2020 and had not resumed despite a statement that they would do so in 2025, and "The Chagossians in reality are treated worse than tourists and yachtsmen who are routinely given permits to visit the outer islands." He found that the correspondence about a visit showed "a disregard, or administrative inertia" towards the fact that many Chagossians are elderly. He concluded that "this is a Court of Justice and I must grapple with the situation as it is before me."

=== Jurisdiction over the Constitution Order ===
It was common ground that, if the court had jurisdiction, it was not bound by the House of Lords' decision in Bancoult (No 2), whose speeches were "highly persuasive but not binding". The Commissioner argued that the Constitution Order was made by the Crown in right of the United Kingdom and so could be reviewed only in the English courts. The judge noted that the government had taken differing positions on the point in earlier litigation, and that in Bancoult (No 2) the Divisional Court had found, and counsel for the Secretary of State had accepted in the Court of Appeal, that the Order was made in right of the BIOT. He held that the contrary statements of Lord Rodger and Lord Carswell in the House of Lords had been made on a concession or without full argument, observing that "law cannot be made by counsels' concessions".

Applying R (Quark Fishing Ltd) v Secretary of State for Foreign and Commonwealth Affairs (No 2), in which the House of Lords held that an instruction under the similar constitution of South Georgia and the South Sandwich Islands was given in right of that territory, he held that the Constitution Order "is an Order passed in right of BIOT". The fact that the English High Court could also exercise supervisory jurisdiction over an overseas territory did not oust the territory's own courts. He added "a more principled answer": the claimants were alleged to have committed an offence under BIOT law and faced removal under BIOT law, and "The suggestion by the Defendant that such a person subject to enforcement procedures in the BIOT, under BIOT laws, must seek judicial review in England and Wales to argue unlawfulness is fanciful." He therefore held that the court had jurisdiction to consider the lawfulness of section 9.

=== Section 9 of the Constitution Order ===
The judge distinguished legislation made by the Crown in Council under the royal prerogative from Acts of Parliament: "The former is reviewable while the latter is not." Adopting Lord Bingham's statement that it is for the courts to inquire into whether a prerogative power exists and its extent, he added that it is also for the courts to inquire whether such a power "continues to exist owing to material changes in circumstances". Relying on Lord Bingham's and Lord Mance's speeches, and on Lord Mansfield's propositions in Campbell v Hall (1774), he stated that "There is no historical authority for a prerogative power to expel or permanently exclude a population of British subjects from the territory to which their citizenship belongs."

He characterised the majority's reasoning in Bancoult (No 2) as "based on pragmatic reasons", centred on the defence requirements of the base on Diego Garcia and on the feasibility and cost of resettlement, which the British government was not willing to bear. He rejected Demetriou's submission that the words of section 9 referring to defence purposes were "mere surplusage", holding that if that purpose were removed "the necessity for, and reasonableness of, the provision is reduced to vanishing point". He also noted the challenge to the earlier feasibility study in Bancoult (No 4) and the 2015 KPMG study, which in his summary found that resettlement came down to cost.

Agreeing with Lord Bingham and Lord Mance, he held that the use of the prerogative to enact section 9 "was not permissible and it is therefore void", and that "any rational reason for passing the provision has now disappeared, if there ever was one." In his view "A claimed power to exclude a whole population must be justified by legal source, not administrative necessity."

=== Effect of the 2025 treaty ===
From Article 6 of the 2025 treaty, agreed by the British government, the judge concluded that "there is no defence or national security concerns anymore against repopulating the outer islands by Chagossians". He held that the cost reason had also gone, setting out the payments to Mauritius under the treaty, while finding the exact figures "immaterial": the government had committed to pay substantial sums "for a commitment that includes the costs of resettlement, albeit this resettlement is not guaranteed under the Treaty". It followed that it could no longer be said that the outer islands were required for the defence purposes recited in section 9 or that repopulation was not feasible on economic grounds.

He concluded that he preferred the minority's reasoning and that "the majority would not now find that the practical and pragmatic considerations they then took into account overrode the fundamental rights of the Chagossians." He held:

I am satisfied that Section 9 of the Constitutional Order cannot stand and that it is an unlawful and irrational exercise of the prerogative and should be quashed.

=== Section 5 of the Immigration Order ===
The judge held that section 5 of the Immigration Order, which requires a permit to enter or be present, did not fall automatically with section 9, a point that had not been fully argued. Immigration control by permit could be seen as a different category from the right of abode, and a government has a legitimate right to control entry to particular places, having regard to factors such as habitability and safety. He added that "the refusal of a permit to those who can legitimately claim a right to abode would require very strong reasons indeed", and that an application to set up a permanent camp on an uninhabited island raised different considerations from a temporary visit to graves. Being a Chagossian was now "clearly a highly relevant factor" in decisions on permits and removal, which neither the Acting Principal Immigration Officer nor the Commissioner had considered; that alone required the decisions to be reconsidered. In case the court lacked jurisdiction over section 9, he went on to decide the other grounds on ordinary public law principles.

=== Procedural fairness ===
The judge held that the challenge to the failure to issue a permit before the landing was "hopeless and unarguable", since no application had been made. The challenge to the removal notices and to the treatment of the permit application made on 18 February had more merit. The notices had been prepared in advance by Goddard, who had been in post for nine days and did not visit the island or speak to the claimants, and the claimants were given no opportunity to make representations. The reasons Goddard later gave in his witness statement were new reasons given after proceedings had begun, and were approached with caution; no contemporaneous records of the decision had been disclosed despite a court direction to do so. The judge noted that in a 2023 case concerning migrants the Commissioner had withdrawn removal notices and adopted a statement of process, so that he "cannot have been but alive to the requirements for fair process".

Demetriou submitted that any unfairness had been cured by the Commissioner's appeal, which she described as an "appeal de novo". Taking that description at face value, the judge held that the Commissioner had not conducted a complete rehearing: he had dismissed the appeal for want of stated grounds and had otherwise relied on Goddard's witness statement, without considering afresh the claimants' 23-page application for interim relief, which he had before him. No consideration had been given to a limited heritage visit, although the second claimant was born on Île du Coin and the claimants' ancestors were buried there, and "Chagossians should be treated in a more favourable category than tourists and visiting yachtsmen." He found that "the overall procedure did not meet the required standard of fairness", and that the notices should be reconsidered after the claimants had been able to make representations.

=== Illegality ground ===
The claimants argued that removal would amount to a serious crime, relying chiefly on the International Criminal Court Act 2001, which in the judgment's summary makes it a crime against humanity to deport an entire population, or would amount to discrimination. The judge held: "This ground is unarguable. It is quite hopeless to suggest that the officers of BIOT have committed such an offence, or were acting in a discriminatory manner". Unincorporated treaties are not part of domestic law, and the crime relied on "is not a crime in the BIOT".

=== Conclusions ===
The judge stated his conclusions as follows:

- he quashed section 9 of the Constitution Order and declared it "unlawful and/or Wednesbury unreasonable, especially in light of the current circumstances";
- the claimants had entered and were staying on Île du Coin illegally, without permits; section 5 of the Immigration Order remained valid; "Nothing in this decision creates a right for the Claimants to set up a permanent camp on the Ile du Coin without the necessary permits"; and the judgment was without prejudice to private land rights;
- the removal notices were quashed and had to be redetermined by a fair procedure including the claimants' representations;
- the permit application of 18 February 2026 remained outstanding; and
- future decisions on permits must take into account "all the circumstances including heritage rights and the right of abode of any Chagossian entitled to them".

== Order, stay and appeal ==
The court's order, dated 31 March 2026, granted permission to apply for judicial review and allowed the claim in part, dismissing the remainder. It declared section 9 of the Constitution Order unlawful, quashed it, and quashed the removal notices served on 18 February and upheld on appeal on 25 February 2026, and gave directions for written submissions on costs.

The order granted the Commissioner permission to appeal to the Court of Appeal. It also provided that "The effects of paragraphs (iii) to (vi) above are to be stayed pending final determination of the Defendant's appeal before the Court of Appeal." The declaration that section 9 is unlawful, the quashing of section 9 and of the removal notices, and the costs directions therefore do not take effect while the appeal is pending. The interim injunction granted on 19 February 2026 was to continue "until further order of this Court or the Court of Appeal". If the appeal is not pursued or is discontinued, the stay and the continued injunction cease to have effect.

The appeal, titled His Majesty's Commissioner for the British Indian Ocean Territory v The King (on the application of Mandarin & Ors) with the reference [2026] BIOT CA (Civ) 1, was listed for hearing in open court on 15–17 July 2026 before the British Indian Ocean Territory Court of Appeal, sitting at the Field House Tribunal Hearing Centre. The panel listed was Sir Howard Morrison (President) and Justices of Appeal Lane, Plimmer, Nott and Bird. The court reserved its decision at the end of the hearing on 17 July, and on 4 November 2026 gave notice that it would hand down judgment on 12 November 2026.

== Commentary ==
Writing on the Administrative Court Blog in June 2026, Anurag Deb examined the judgment's reasoning at paragraphs 150–179, noting that the Constitution Order is an Order in Council made under the prerogative and that "The BIOT Order is, in other words, primary legislation". He wrote that, because the BIOT's final court of appeal is the Judicial Committee of the Privy Council, Lewis CJ was not bound by Bancoult (No 2), and that "Bancoult (No. 2) therefore effectively opened the door through which Lewis CJ walked in Mandarin", since the House of Lords had held such Orders reviewable on ordinary grounds. In Deb's analysis the decisive question was historical, whether the Crown had ever had power to exclude a population of its subjects, so that "the decisive standard by which that scrutiny was undertaken involved historical enquiry". He disagreed in part with the judge's account of Bancoult (No 2), arguing that the majority's reasoning there was not purely pragmatic, since Lord Rodger and Lord Carswell had considered whether the Order offended a fundamental principle of English law. He concluded that the decision did not open Acts of Parliament to quashing, and that "Mandarin is thus a specific development in a specific context."

== See also ==
- Expulsion of the Chagossians
- Resettlement of Île du Coin
- R v Secretary of State for Foreign and Commonwealth Affairs, ex parte Bancoult (No 2)
- R (on the application of Bancoult (No 2)) v Secretary of State for Foreign and Commonwealth Affairs
- Chagos Archipelago sovereignty dispute

== Sources ==
=== Court decisions ===
- R (Mandarin and others) v HM Commissioner for the British Indian Ocean Territory (Supreme Court of the British Indian Ocean Territory 31 March 2026), Text.
- R (Mandarin and others) v HM Commissioner for the British Indian Ocean Territory: Order (Supreme Court of the British Indian Ocean Territory 31 March 2026), Text.
- "Cause list, 15–17 July 2026: HM Commissioner for the British Indian Ocean Territory v The King (on the application of Mandarin & Ors), [2026] BIOT CA (Civ) 1" (PDF). British Indian Ocean Territory Court of Appeal. 2026.
- "Notice of judgment hand down: His Majesty's Commissioner for the British Indian Ocean Territory v The King (on the application of Mandarin & Ors), [2026] BIOT CA (Civ) 1" (PDF). British Indian Ocean Territory Court of Appeal. 4 November 2026.

=== Other sources ===
- AFP (18 February 2026). "Chagos islanders say they refuse to leave in protest against UK handover". Arab News.
- "Deportation of Chagos Islanders blocked by judge". BBC News. 19 February 2026.
- Deb, Anurag (2 June 2026). "The quashing of primary legislation: mystifying or mundane?". Administrative Court Blog.
- "Supreme Court of the British Indian Ocean Territory grants interim injunction preventing removal of Chagossian claimants" (Press release). Keystone Law. 26 February 2026.
- "Chagos : la décision de la Cour d'appel britannique mise en délibéré". Outre-mer La 1ère (in French). France Télévisions. 21 July 2026.
- "Britain issues removal orders to four who landed on Chagos atoll". Reuters. 18 February 2026.
