= Resettlement of Île du Coin =

2026 event in the Chagos Islands

On 16 February 2026 four Chagossians landed without permits on Île du Coin, in the Peros Banhos atoll of the Chagos Archipelago, intending to establish what they said would be a permanent settlement. The group was led by Misley Mandarin, who said he had been elected first minister of a Chagossian government-in-exile in December 2025, and was accompanied by the former Conservative MP Adam Holloway. The landing was a protest against the planned transfer of sovereignty over the islands from the United Kingdom to Mauritius. According to the organisers, it aimed to stop the ratification of the Agreement concerning the Chagos Archipelago including Diego Garcia, the 2025 treaty providing for the transfer, and the group's "Declaration of Return" demanded a binding referendum of Chagossians on their future. No Chagossian had lived on any of the islands since 1973, after the expulsion of the Chagossians.

The British Indian Ocean Territory (BIOT) authorities served removal notices on the four on 18 February, and the following day the territory's Chief Justice, James Lewis, granted an injunction preventing their removal. The British Foreign Office called the landing an "illegal, unsafe stunt", and the Mauritian Attorney General called it a "publicity stunt". Two more people went ashore on 26 February.

In a judgment of 31 March 2026 the Chief Justice quashed the provision of the territory's constitution that denies anyone a right of abode, but held that the settlers were on the island illegally and that the decision gave them no right to set up a permanent camp without permits. The effect of the decision was stayed pending an appeal by the BIOT Commissioner, which was heard by the British Indian Ocean Territory Court of Appeal on 15–17 July 2026. The Court of Appeal reserved its decision, and on 4 November 2026 gave notice that it would hand down judgment on 12 November. As of September 2026 six Chagossians were living on the island.

== Background ==
Île du Coin, in the Peros Banhos atoll, was historically the site of a settled administrative centre; it now has an abandoned church, graves and derelict buildings, and a mooring at which visiting yachts are usually permitted to stay for up to four weeks. It lies roughly 135 miles north of Diego Garcia, the site of a joint British and American military base. The archipelago's population was removed between 1966 and 1972. Under section 9 of the British Indian Ocean Territory (Constitution) Order 2004 "no person has the right of abode in the Territory", and the Immigration Order 2004 prohibits entry or presence without a permit. Heritage visits for Chagossians, held in ten years between 2006 and 2019, were stopped in 2020 and had not resumed by 2026, despite a statement that they would do so in 2025.

On 22 May 2025 the United Kingdom and Mauritius signed a treaty under which the UK would cede sovereignty over the archipelago to Mauritius while keeping Diego Garcia under a 99-year lease. Article 6 provides that "Mauritius is free to implement a programme of resettlement on the islands of the Chagos Archipelago other than Diego Garcia". The treaty is opposed by some Chagossians, who accuse Mauritius of decades of neglect, an accusation Mauritius denies. In February 2026 it had not been ratified.

== Timeline ==
=== Planning and voyage ===
According to the claimants' evidence to the BIOT Supreme Court, Holloway approached Misley Mandarin in December 2025 and swore him to secrecy, and the claimants left for Thailand on 24 January 2026. The Commissioner's evidence referred to a meeting in Phuket and Sri Lanka as suggesting preplanning. In his own account in The Spectator, Holloway wrote that the group had bought a boat in Thailand, provisioned it in Sri Lanka and made a five-day passage from Galle to the northern atolls of the archipelago, in "absolute secrecy". He wrote that he had found "several philanthropists" to pay for provisions. The Independent reported that the expedition was funded by Christopher Harborne, whom it described as Reform UK's biggest donor; BBC News reported that the visit was funded by donations organised by the Great British PAC, "a right-wing British political pressure group" that was campaigning against the treaty. Holloway, a former Conservative MP, had moved to Reform UK.

=== Arrival ===
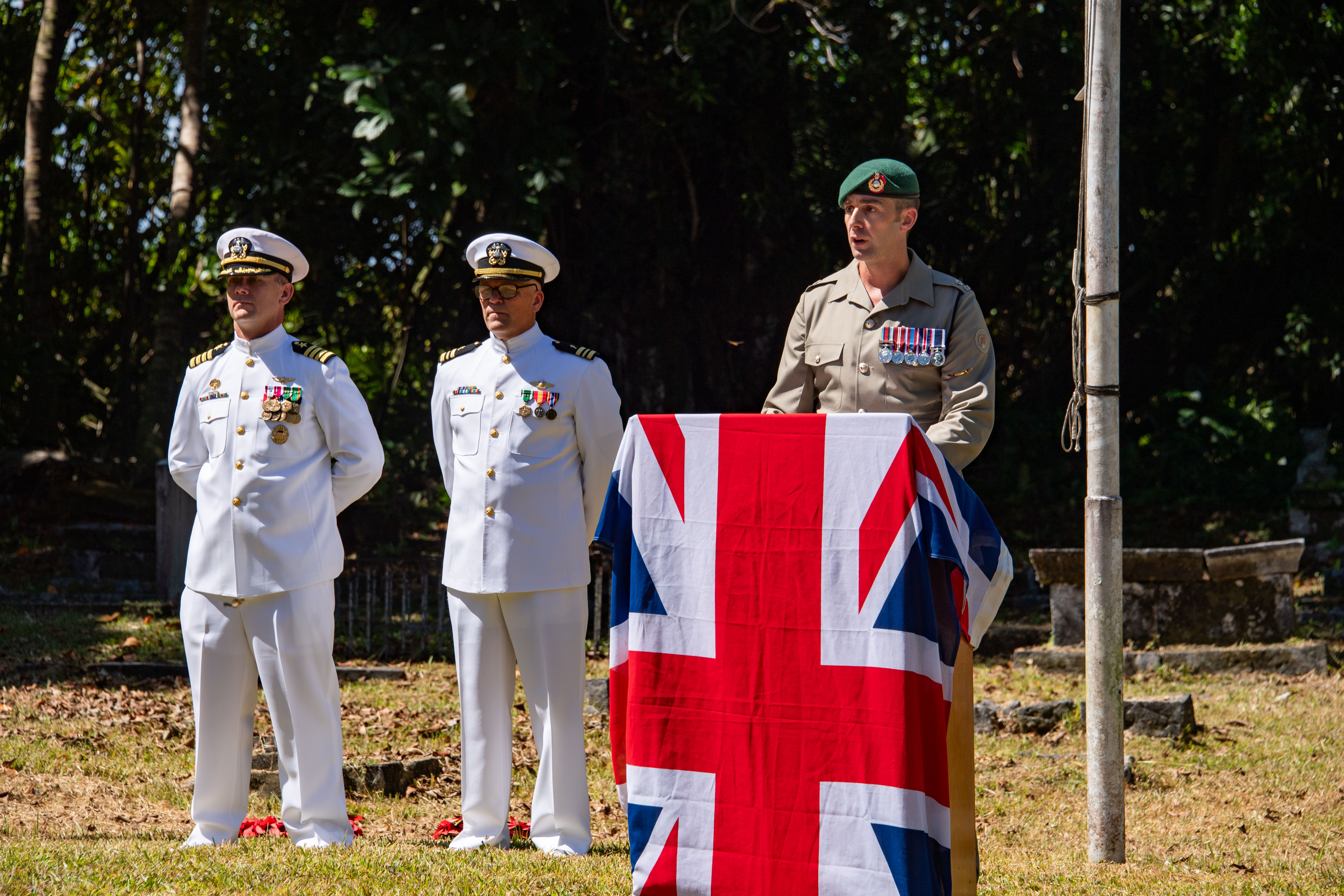
Royal Marines Major Peter Goddard, as Acting Principal Immigration Officer of the BIOT, issued removal notices to the four claimants on 18 February 2026.

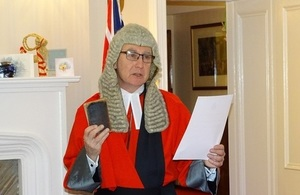
The Chief Justice of the BIOT, James Lewis, granted the settlers an interim injunction against the removal notices on 19 February 2026.

On 16 February 2026 the yacht SY No Excuse entered BIOT waters without permission and travelled to Peros Banhos with nine people on board. The BIOT Supreme Court later found that all of them knew they were entering the territory illegally, and that the yacht's Automatic Identification System had been switched off. Those on board were the four Chagossians, three mariners responsible for navigating the yacht, the journalist Paul Wood, and Holloway. The four Chagossians were Misley Mandarin, his father Michel Mandarin, Antoine Lemettre and Guy Castel.

The group went ashore on Île du Coin at 08:52 local time. The news first emerged through the group's own online posts, which Le Mauricien noted had not been independently confirmed. Mandarin told Reuters that the group was living in tents and expected ten more arrivals the following week and many more in the coming year. He said that his father had been removed from the island aged 14, and that he wanted the 322 people who he said were born on Île du Coin and still alive "to come home before they die". He sought to reassure the United States that the settlement did not threaten the base on Diego Garcia. The court described the camp as "well prepared and supplied", with Starlink communications.

=== Aims ===
News reports described the landing as a protest against the transfer of the islands: BBC News said that the four had travelled "to protest against a deal to hand over the territory to Mauritius", and Reuters reported that they hoped the settlement would complicate the British plan. Mandarin told AFP: "The UK is handing away my homeland to Mauritius. That's the reason why we're here". According to the organisers, the landing aimed to stop the ratification of the treaty and to obtain a referendum of Chagossians on their future: on landing the group proclaimed a "Declaration of Return" which, as quoted by Le Mauricien, called on Britain, the United States and the international community "to halt the ratification of the treaty until the Chagossian people have exercised our right of self-determination", and stated: "We demand a binding referendum on our future." Le Défi Media reported that the declaration reaffirmed the Chagossian people's right to self-determination, and that Mandarin said he wanted to prevent the British government from transferring the archipelago to Mauritius. (Note: As reported by Le Défi Media: « Misley Mandarin affirme également vouloir empêcher le gouvernement britannique de transférer l'archipel à Maurice. ») On 18 February he told BBC Radio 4's Today programme: "Keir Starmer, you could be a hero right now - don't ratify that deal, cancel that deal and let Chagossians come back to their homeland as British". The same day, according to Radio One, he said that he would continue to defy the British authorities in order to press for the treaty to be suspended. (Note: As reported by Radio One: « Il continuera à défier les autorités britanniques pour faire pression à ce que le deal sur le traité de rétrocession entre le Royaume Uni et Maurice soit suspendus. »)

Holloway wrote in The Spectator that the four islanders had come to establish a permanent settlement, "which they hope will make it impossible for the Starmer government to hand the territory to Mauritius". He also wrote that the group hoped "the physical presence of Chagossians on the islands" would allow them to assert their rights, and that it could be decisive in stopping the handover. BBC News likewise reported that the group arrived "with the aim of establishing a permanent settlement".

Mandarin had made similar demands before the voyage: in April 2025 he said that no agreement could be concluded without consulting the Chagossians and that a referendum was necessary. In December 2025, as interim first minister of the government-in-exile, he wrote to Starmer and the Foreign Secretary, Yvette Cooper, asking the government to suspend ratification of the treaty and to hold a referendum open to all Chagossians.

After the landing, in a video posted from the island in March 2026, Mandarin said that the treaty was compromised and that the litigation over the settlement had delayed its ratification. In April 2026, after what Radio One described as Starmer's suspension of the agreement, the Great British PAC said that it would continue to support Mandarin and BIOT Citizens, and that their action would help to prevent the treaty from being implemented. In September 2026 Mandarin said in a live video that the legal and legislative fight in the United Kingdom to prevent the transfer would be hard, and Le Mauricien wrote that he intended to use the occupation as a means of contesting the agreement between London and Port Louis. (Note: Le Mauricien: « entend faire de cette occupation un moyen de contester l'accord conclu entre Londres et Port-Louis ».)

=== Removal notices and injunction ===
The Commissioner learnt of the yacht on 17 February and sent the BIOT patrol vessel to make contact. On 18 February the Acting Principal Immigration Officer, Major Peter Goddard, issued removal notices to the four under section 12 of the Immigration Order, and a notice was served on the yacht's master. The only reason given was that each was "a person unlawfully present in the Territory". According to Reuters, which saw the orders, returning to the territory in breach of them would be an offence punishable by up to three years' imprisonment or a fine of £3,000, or both. Mandarin told AFP: "They want to remove us from the island but we're going to stay put". The same day the settlers' solicitors appealed to the Commissioner and asked for permits for them to remain; the Commissioner dismissed the appeal on 25 February.

On 19 February the settlers applied out of hours for urgent relief, and the Chief Justice granted an interim injunction preventing their removal until their claim for judicial review could be decided. He said: "There is no doubt the balance of convenience falls on the side of the claimants". He added: "They are 120 miles from Diego Garcia and pose no threat to national security on the evidence before me." (Note: The final judgment places Île du Coin "roughly 135 miles north of Diego Garcia".) The application had been based on the refusal of a heritage visit, and did not tell the court that the group intended to set up a permanent camp. The Foreign Office said that it remained "both illegal and unsafe to enter the outer Chagos islands without a valid permit".

=== Resupply and further arrivals ===
The yacht reached Gan in the Maldives on 21 February, where two people left it and six new people joined "purportedly as crew". The judgment records media reports that Nigel Farage had flown to the Maldives intending to join the yacht, which did not happen, "perhaps owing to this Court's interim order that the Yacht could only be used for resupply". On 20 February the Foreign Office had told the BIOT Administration that it had asked the Maldivian authorities to block the yacht's harbour access, and the Minister of State for Europe, North America and Overseas Territories, Stephen Doughty, asked for a contingency plan in case a risk to life emerged.

On 26 February the yacht returned to Île du Coin and unloaded supplies; two of the new crew went ashore and remained, apparently to the surprise of the yacht's master, while Holloway reboarded and the yacht left, indicating that it would not return. On 2 March the Commissioner offered, subject to permission from the operator of the BIOT patrol vessel, that those on the island might be taken to Malé; the offer was not taken up. By July 2026 six Chagossians were living on the island. In September 2026 the six were still there, while Holloway, the journalist and the crew of the original expedition had left. Radio One reported that month that the group intended to camp on the island for a further 18 months.

== Conditions on the island ==
In evidence to the court, the Commissioner described Île du Coin as uninhabited since 1971, with no functioning infrastructure, safe drinking water, adequate food sources or medical facilities. He regarded a permanent camp as a serious risk to life and health, particularly for the two elderly members of the group, and said that evacuation options were limited. He also raised the island's location within the marine protected area, the diversion of the patrol vessel from its other duties, and the risk that unauthorised landings might encourage further voyages and be exploited by hostile actors near Diego Garcia.

The claimants' evidence was that they were camped at the permitted yacht mooring, were not eating the island's crabs, bagged their waste for removal by boat, and had begun repairing ancestral graves. In early March they told the court that they had coconuts, fish, breadfruit and water, that they were living comfortably, and that they would not need resupply until the end of the month. In September 2026 Le Mauricien reported that the six were living in worn tents with limited reserves of water and food and no direct access to medical care; in August the BIOT Administration had supplied them with about three months of essential goods, and they supplemented their stores by fishing.

The BIOT budget for 2026–27, enacted by the Commissioner on 15 June 2026, appropriated £3,000,000 for "Ile du Coin-Related Costs", out of total expenditure of £11,500,000.

== Legal status ==
The settlers' claim for judicial review of the removal notices and of the failure to grant them permits was heard by the Chief Justice on 13 March 2026. In his judgment of 31 March he observed that "Neither party comes out well in this matter." He found that the landing had been deliberate and planned. He also criticised the authorities, saying that "The Chagossians in reality are treated worse than tourists and yachtsmen who are routinely given permits to visit the outer islands."

The judge held that the court had jurisdiction to review the 2004 Constitution Order, and quashed section 9 as unlawful and irrational, reasoning that the 2025 treaty had removed the defence and cost justifications on which the House of Lords had upheld it in 2008. He held, however, that the claimants had entered and were staying on Île du Coin illegally, that the permit requirement in section 5 of the Immigration Order remained valid, and that "Nothing in this decision creates a right for the Claimants to set up a permanent camp on the Ile du Coin without the necessary permits." He quashed the removal notices as procedurally unfair, directed that they be redetermined after the claimants had made representations, and held that their permit application of 18 February remained to be decided, taking into account "heritage rights and the right of abode of any Chagossian entitled to them".

The court's order granted the Commissioner permission to appeal, stayed the effect of the declaration and quashing orders pending the appeal, and continued the interim injunction against removal. The appeal, His Majesty's Commissioner for the British Indian Ocean Territory v The King (on the application of Mandarin & Ors), was listed before the British Indian Ocean Territory Court of Appeal, presided over by Sir Howard Morrison, for 15–17 July 2026. At the hearing, lawyers for the British government asked the court to overturn the decision. The court reserved its decision at the end of the hearing on 17 July; it had still not been given in September 2026, and on 4 November the court gave notice that it would hand down judgment on 12 November 2026.

Separately, Misley and Michel Mandarin had been claimants with Bertrice Pompe in a claim for judicial review in England alleging, among other grounds, that the Foreign Office had failed to consult the Chagossian community lawfully. On 10 March 2026 the High Court refused permission for the claim to proceed, holding that it was not arguable.

== Reactions ==
=== United Kingdom ===
A Foreign Office spokesperson said that the government was working with Mauritius to resume heritage visits, and that "This kind of illegal, unsafe stunt is not the way to achieve that." The spokesperson added: "The vessel does not pose any security risk to Diego Garcia." After the 31 March judgment the Foreign Office said that it did not agree with it, and described the group's arrival as "an irresponsible political stunt that has wasted tax-payers' money and put people's lives at risk".

Farage said that the four were British passport holders seeking to "reclaim their birthright". The Shadow Foreign Secretary, Priti Patel, said after the judgment that Chagossians had "ended up taking matters into their own hands". Mandarin said of the ruling: "Today justice has finally begun to catch up with history."

In October 2026, during a dispute between the Conservative leader, Kemi Badenoch, and Farage over Farage's remark that he would have given Trump the Diego Garcia base "in perpetuity", Reform UK released a statement from Mandarin saying that the Conservatives "cannot be trusted by the Chagos people". He added: "We know Nigel has the Chagossians at heart."

=== Mauritius ===
The Mauritian Attorney General, Gavin Glover, said that the group had landed illegally, called the landing a "publicity stunt organised to create a situation of conflict with the British government", and said that Mauritius would not exercise authority over the islands until the treaty was ratified. According to Le Mauricien, he said that the landing came as debates on the treaty were likely to resume in the House of Lords the following week. He said that Mauritius had made "a solemn commitment" to return Chagossians to their homeland as soon as possible. After the 31 March judgment Glover said that it did not give the settlers a right to remain and confirmed that they were there illegally, describing it as a reprieve until their case was reviewed or an appeal decided.

=== United States ===
On 17 February 2026 the State Department said that it supported the UK's decision to proceed with the treaty. The following day President Donald Trump wrote on Truth Social that Keir Starmer was "making a big mistake by entering a 100 Year Lease", and that "this land should not be taken away from the UK".

=== Other Chagossians ===
BBC News noted that Chagossians "do not speak with one voice" on the treaty. In April 2026 Olivier Bancoult, leader of the Chagos Refugees Group, disputed Mandarin's claim to represent the community, saying that no government recognised him as first minister and that the group's opponents were serving British opposition politicians; he said that his group fully supported the treaty. In October 2026 Al Jazeera reported that the Chagos Refugees Group was at odds with Mandarin and his supporters, who favour resettlement under British rather than Mauritian sovereignty and have received backing from Reform UK.

== Status of the treaty ==
On 25 February 2026 a Foreign Office minister, Hamish Falconer, said that the attempt to ratify the treaty had been paused; the Foreign Office later said that he had misspoken, but conceded that it would proceed only with American support. In April 2026 the government told Parliament that the implementing bill could not complete its passage before the end of the parliamentary session on 29 April. On 21 September the Prime Minister, Andy Burnham, said that the UK would work with Mauritius and the United States on a way forward, and the Mauritian Prime Minister, Navin Ramgoolam, travelled to London on 26 September for talks with the National Security Adviser, Jonathan Powell. On 23 October the House of Lords gave a second reading to a private member's bill introduced by Lord Weir of Ballyholme, which would restrict any transfer of sovereignty "without the approval of Parliament and without the consent of the Chagossian people"; the government opposed it, rejecting "the Bill's call for a referendum". On 27 October the Foreign Secretary, Ed Miliband, told the Commons that "under this US Administration, we will not get consent for the current arrangements", but that the government continued "to work with the US and Mauritius to safeguard our security interests". Burnham and Ramgoolam met at the Commonwealth summit in Antigua on 4 November and agreed "to work on a shared plan to make further progress by the end of the year". As of November 2026 the treaty had not entered into force. In an opinion piece in October 2026, Timothy Walker of the Institute for Security Studies wrote that the landing and the litigation and court rulings that followed had "introduced further legal complications".

== See also ==
- Government of the Chagos Islands
- Île du Coin
- Chagos Archipelago sovereignty dispute
- Expulsion of the Chagossians

== Sources ==
=== Court decisions ===
- R (Mandarin and others) v HM Commissioner for the British Indian Ocean Territory (Supreme Court of the British Indian Ocean Territory 31 March 2026), Text.
- R (Mandarin and others) v HM Commissioner for the British Indian Ocean Territory: Order (Supreme Court of the British Indian Ocean Territory 31 March 2026), Text.
- "Cause list, 15–17 July 2026: HM Commissioner for the British Indian Ocean Territory v The King (on the application of Mandarin & Ors), [2026] BIOT CA (Civ) 1" (PDF). British Indian Ocean Territory Court of Appeal. 2026.
- "Notice of judgment hand down: His Majesty's Commissioner for the British Indian Ocean Territory v The King (on the application of Mandarin & Ors), [2026] BIOT CA (Civ) 1" (PDF). British Indian Ocean Territory Court of Appeal. 4 November 2026.
- R (Pompe) v Secretary of State for Foreign, Commonwealth and Development Affairs; R (Mandarin) v Secretary of State for Foreign, Commonwealth and Development Affairs, EWHC (Admin) 529 (High Court 10 March 2026).

=== Official documents ===
- Special Gazette, Vol. LVIII, No. 2 of 2026 (including the Appropriation (2026–2027) Ordinance 2026) (PDF) (Report). British Indian Ocean Territory Administration. 23 June 2026.
- "Topical Questions". Hansard, House of Commons. 27 October 2026.
- "British Sovereignty Protection (Chagos Islands) Bill [HL]". Hansard, House of Lords. 23 October 2026.
- "PM meetings with world leaders at CHOGM" (Press release). Prime Minister's Office, 10 Downing Street. 5 November 2026.
- "British Sovereignty Protection (Chagos Islands) Bill [HL]: Stages". UK Parliament.

=== News and other sources ===
- AFP (18 February 2026). "Chagos islanders say they refuse to leave in protest against UK handover". Arab News.
- Arjanee, Ameerah (2 October 2026). "UK-Mauritius Chagos sovereignty deal stalls amid fears of further delays". Al Jazeera English.
- Badshah, Nadeem (17 February 2026). "Four Chagossians return to islands in attempt to stop British transfer to Mauritius". The Guardian.
- "Deportation of Chagos Islanders blocked by judge". BBC News. 19 February 2026.
- "«Nous sommes chez nous» : un groupe de Chagossiens conduit par Misley Mandarin, «Premier ministre en exil», pose pied aux Chagos". Le Défi Media (in French). 17 February 2026.
- Holloway, Adam (18 February 2026). "Why I helped invade the Chagos Islands". The Spectator.
- Judoobar, Bryan (16 September 2026). "Peros Banhos : Mandarin et ses quatre acolytes comptent camper pendant encore 18 mois". Radio One (in French).
- "Chagos : la décision de la Cour d'appel britannique mise en délibéré". Outre-mer La 1ère (in French). France Télévisions. 21 July 2026.
- "Île Maurice : les Premiers ministres mauricien et britannique vont échanger cet après-midi à propos des Chagos". Outre-mer La 1ère (in French). France Télévisions. 21 September 2026.
- "Chagos : un groupe affirme avoir débarqué à Peros Banhos pour s'y installer durablement". Le Mauricien (in French). 17 February 2026.
- "Océan Indien — Souveraineté et décolonisation : 3 Anglo-Chagossiens occupent l'île du Coin à Peros Banhos". Le Mauricien (in French). 18 February 2026.
- "Chagos : la revendication maldivienne ouvre un nouveau front diplomatique". Le Mauricien (in French). 14 September 2026.
- "Ile Maurice: Bancoult veut faire entendre «la vraie voix» de la communauté à Londres". L'Express (in French). 28 April 2026 – via allAfrica.
- "Ile Maurice: Des exilés défient la zone d'exclusion et annoncent une installation à Peros Banhos". L'Express (in French). 17 February 2026 – via allAfrica.
- "Ile Maurice: «Sursis» pour Misley Mandarin et les trois autres". L'Express (in French). 1 April 2026 – via allAfrica.
- "Ile Maurice: Londres veut faire annuler le sursis accordé aux Chagossiens de Peros Banhos". L'Express (in French). 6 July 2026 – via allAfrica.
- "Afrique: L'autodétermination au coeur des débats devant la Cour d'appel". L'Express (in French). 17 July 2026 – via allAfrica.
- Limbeea Ragaven, Jessila (18 February 2026). "Misley Mandarin : « Je ne bougera pas de la terre de mes ancêtres »". Radio One (in French).
- Limbeea Ragaven, Jessila (16 March 2026). "De Peros Banhos : Mandarin dit avoir empêché Maurice d'obtenir Rs 10 mds pour son prochain budget". Radio One (in French).
- Limbeea Ragaven, Jessila (12 April 2026). "Suspension de l'accord sur les Chagos : La Great British PAC, fervente soutien Mandarin, jubile". Radio One (in French).
- Lukiv, Jaroslav (18 February 2026). "Do not give away Diego Garcia, Trump tells UK". BBC News.
- Lynch, David; Ng, Ellie (14 October 2026). "Badenoch and Farage both dig in amid row over Falklands-Chagos 'trade' proposal". Nation.Cymru. PA Media.
- Maddox, David (20 February 2026). "Starmer's Chagos Islands deal hits new crisis after judge blocks removal of islanders". The Independent.
- Maddox, David (25 February 2026). "Was this the week Starmer's Chagos deal finally died?". The Independent.
- Maddox, David; Devlin, Kate (31 March 2026). "Starmer's Chagos deal dealt major blow as judge rules Chagossians have right to live on disputed islands". The Independent.
- Nuckchhed, Vashish (25 December 2025). "Chagos : «Il serait injuste de répéter l'erreur de 1965», plaide Misley Mandarin". L'Express (in French).
- "Britain issues removal orders to four who landed on Chagos atoll". Reuters. 18 February 2026.
- Stacey, Kiran (5 November 2026). "Burnham wants to 'recast' Chagos Islands deal after US resistance". The Guardian.
- "Four islanders land on remote Chagos atoll, hope to block UK-Mauritius deal". The Straits Times. Reuters. 18 February 2026.
- Thomas, Fernando (3 April 2025). "Accord sur les Chagos : Londres réaffirme son engagement, mais la diaspora reste divisée". Le Défi Media (in French).
- Walker, Timothy (16 October 2026). "Has Mauritius lost its agency in the Chagos deal?". News24 (Opinion).
