= Campbell v Hall =

1774 King's Bench case

- Court: Court of King's Bench (England)
- Full case name: James Campbell (Plaintiff) v. William Hall (Defendant)
- Decided: Michaelmas Term, 1774
- Citation: [1774] EngR 5, (1774) 1 Cowp 204, 98 ER 1045

Court membership
- Judges sitting: Lord Mansfield, C.J., Aston, Willes, and Ashhurst, JJ.

Case opinions
- Decision by: Lord Mansfield, C.J.

Keywords
- law applicable in colonies; extent of Royal prerogative therein; role of Parliament in this field; where authority of colonial legislatures begins

Campbell v Hall (1774) 1 Cowp 204, 98 ER 1045 was a case decided in the Court of King's Bench in 1774. On its face it was a private action for recovery of sums paid to a tax agent, but the decision laid down the principles of the King's constitutional authority in a British colony, deciding amongst other things that such authority is absolute until a representative assembly is granted, at which point the authority of the Crown is limited.

The matter was first heard in the Mayor's and City of London Court, which court found a special verdict and remitted it to the Court of King's Bench, which then heard the claim on a matter of law.

The decision turned on the validity of a tax imposed in Grenada. This was the trigger for an examination of the constitutional position of Grenada and for a review of the position in all British territories.

The political situation at the time of the judgment was interesting too; this was the time of the tax rebellion in the American colonies (including the West Indies) and was indeed two years before the American Declaration of Independence. The judgment therefore had the potential to cause political trouble.

Lord Mansfield's judgment looked beyond the narrow facts of the case. He reviewed the law applicable to British colonies in general and laid down a series of important points of constitutional law applicable to British possessions.

== Facts ==
Grenada was captured from the French and formally ceded to Great Britain in 1763. The King issued a proclamation dated 7 October 1763 that all governors of the newly acquired colonies were instructed "as soon as the state and circumstances of the said colonies will admit" to call a general assembly. On 9 April 1764, the King (George III) appointed a Governor, General Melville.

Finally, on 24 July 1764 (before Melville had set sail for Grenada) letters patent were issued to impose a four and a half per cent duty upon all goods and sugars exported from the island of Grenada, to equalise the duty across the Leeward Islands. Melville arrived in Grenada on 14 December 1764. In 1765 he summoned an assembly.

James Campbell bought a plantation on Grenada. William Hall was a collector of the four and a half per cent duty. Campbell brought a claim to recover from Hall the money he had paid as duty. Campbell claimed that 4½% duty had not been imposed by lawful or sufficient authority.

Campbell succeeded, the decision turning on important constitutional principles.

== Judgment ==
Lord Mansfield CJ held:

- A country conquered by the British arms becomes part of the possessions and dominions of the king in right of the Crown of the United Kingdom and therefore, necessarily subject to the jurisdiction of Parliament.
- The conquered inhabitants, once they received the King's protection, become the King's subjects in all respects.
- The law of a colony equally affects all persons and all property there: "Englishmen" have no privilege in the colony distinct from the conquered inhabitants of the colony.
- The king has the power to make laws for the conquered country without the concurrence of Parliament except that the legislation is subordinate to his own authority in Parliament so that he cannot make any new change contrary to fundamental principles such as exempting an individual from the power of Parliament.
- Once the king has irrevocably granted a territory a representative assembly to concur in law making, he can no longer legislate by decree or impose taxation without them.

Lord Mansfield's judgment reaffirmed the authority of the king to make law and impose taxation upon a colony by his own authority. In addition to past judicial pronouncements (of which few were found) he examined historical sources. In particular he found that the sovereign ruled freely by charter and decree in Ireland until its own parliament was founded, Wales until its annexation, Berwick-upon-Tweed until the days of James I and in Calais until its loss, and that power remained unchallenged in other extant British colonies.

However, in contrast in Jamaica, which had a representative assembly, it had been previously decided that a governor could not override a troublesome assembly. Just as in Great Britain the King was restrained by Parliament, the Governor had no power to force laws or taxes on a colony without the consent of its assembly. Only an Act of the Parliament of Great Britain could do that.

Lord Mansfield recognised that the 4½% duty was fair and equitable, even desirable to avoid distorting trade between the Windward Islands. Nevertheless, he ruled it unlawful. Notwithstanding the Crown's wide authority, where a colony has a representative assembly, taxation cannot be imposed without its consent or by Act of Parliament.

In this case, the letters patent of 24 July 1764 predated by some months the existence of the assembly. Nevertheless, Lord Mansfield held that the requirement to call the assembly was in the King's proclamation of 9 April 1764. Therefore, the King's absolute authority ended on that date, notwithstanding that the assembly had not been called and indeed the governor who was to call it had not even left Britain:

Through the inattention of the king's servants in inverting the order in which the instruments should have passed and been notoriously published, the last act is contradictory to and a violation of the first, and is, therefore, void.

== Significance ==
Campbell v. Hall has been cited or referred to in several later cases in the British Empire. Most pointedly it was cited with approval in West Rand Central Gold Mining Company, Limited v. The King, a case which concerned the conquest of the Transvaal and the consequential extinction of the vanquished state's obligations. Its principles were also discussed and distinguished with respect to colonies acquired otherwise than by conquest, by the Judicial Committee of the Privy Council in its 1938 ruling in Sammut v. Strickland.

It was also argued in 2008 in R (Bancoult) v Secretary of State For Foreign and Commonwealth Affairs (also known as the Chagos Islanders case), where Lord Hoffmann, in introducing his opinion, stated:

Authority for these propositions will be found in Lord Mansfield’s judgment in Campbell v Hall (1774) 1 Cowp 204 (“no question was ever started before, but that the King has a right to a legislative authority over a conquered country.”) This appeal requires your Lordships to determine the limits of that power.

He resumed later:

Although the passage from the judgment of Lord Mansfield has regularly been cited for the proposition that the King cannot legislate contrary to fundamental principles of that kind, I suspect that this is to read too much into his remark. The passage may be more readily understood if the punctuation is modernised in this way: The 6th and last proposition is that, if the King (and when I say the King, I always mean the King without the concurrence of Parliament) has a power to alter the old and to introduce new laws in a conquered country, this legislation being subordinate, that is, subordinate to his own authority in Parliament, he cannot make any new change contrary to fundamental principles: he cannot exempt an inhabitant from that particular dominion, as for instance, from the laws of trade, or from the power of Parliament, or give him privileges exclusive of his other subjects; and so in many other instances which might be put."

In March 2026, following the resettlement of the Île du Coin by the Chagossian Government, Campbell v Hall was again cited in the Supreme Court of the British Indian Ocean Territory with Chief Justice James Lewis stating that "In relation to the prerogative, Lord Mance said at [147] in Bancoult No. 2 [regarding Campbell v Hall], and with which I respectfully agree" before stating that "There is no historical authority for a prerogative power to expel or permanently exclude a population of British subjects from the territory to which their citizenship belongs."

Campbell v Hall also called into question the ouster of French law in Quebec by proclamation in 1763. As a result, the Quebec Act was passed in 1774 to confirm that French law continued to govern civil matters, but was ousted in favour of English law in criminal matters.

Parliament subsequently passed the Colonial Laws Validity Act 1865 to deal with conflicting jurisprudence that arose in the years following Campbell.

== See also ==
- UK constitutional law
