= Sydney Selvon =

Mauritian diplomat, historian and journalist (1948–2021)

Dr. Sydney Selvon
- Born: 24 March 1948; Vacoas-Phoenix, British Mauritius
- Died: 26 August 2021 (aged 73); Grand Gaube, Mauritius
- Occupations: Journalist, Historian, Diplomat
- Spouse: Marie Danielle Selvon (m. 1975)
- Writing career
- Language: English, French
- Genre: History
- Subject: Mauritian history
- Notable awards: Prix Marcel Cabon (1979); Prix Nicolas Lambert (1980)

Sydney Selvon (24 March 1948 – 26 August 2021) was a Mauritian journalist, historian, and diplomat. He served as the editor-in-chief of the national daily newspaper Le Mauricien and represented Mauritius internationally as the High Commissioner to Australia.

As an academic and historian, Selvon authored several extensive works on the history of Mauritius, most notably the Historical Dictionary of Mauritius (Scarecrow Press).

== Career ==
=== Journalism ===
Selvon began his career in journalism, eventually rising to become the editor-in-chief of the major Mauritian daily French-language newspaper, Le Mauricien. During his tenure, he was recognized for his reporting, winning the Prix Marcel Cabon in 1979 and the Nicolas Lambert Prize for Journalist of the Year in 1980.

He also worked internationally, serving as an editor for the Rural Press Group in Australia, and worked for English-language newspapers under Sun Media Corporation in Alberta and Saskatchewan, Canada. He was a founding member and general secretary of the Association of Journalists of Mauritius.

=== Landmark legal case ===
In 1993, Selvon and journalist Gilbert Ahnee published an article in Le Mauricien criticizing the Chief Justice of Mauritius. This led to a landmark legal case regarding press freedom and the inherent contempt powers of the judiciary. The case, Ahnee, Sydney Selvon, and Le Mauricien Ltd v. Director of Public Prosecutions, was appealed to the Judicial Committee of the Privy Council in London, which upheld the Supreme Court of Mauritius's authority in 1999.

=== Political and diplomatic service ===
Selvon was active in Mauritian politics and served as a Member of Parliament representing the Mauritian Militant Movement (MMM). Following a government transition, he was appointed as the Mauritian High Commissioner to Australia, serving in the diplomatic post from 1995 to 1996.

== Historical research and authorship ==
Beyond journalism, Selvon was a dedicated historian who authored several comprehensive books on the history of Mauritius. His works aimed to document the nation's history from prehistory through British rule and into the 21st century. His most notable academic work, the Historical Dictionary of Mauritius, was published by Scarecrow Press and peer-reviewed in international academic journals.

His historical research has been utilized at the highest levels of international law; his book A Comprehensive History of Mauritius was officially cited by the Government of Mauritius in their 2018 written statements to the International Court of Justice regarding the Chagos Archipelago sovereignty dispute.

== Personal life and death ==
Selvon was married to Marie Danielle Selvon, who also served as a Member of Parliament in Mauritius. He died on 26 August 2021 at the age of 73 in Grand Gaube, Mauritius.

== Selected works ==
- Historical Dictionary of Mauritius (Scarecrow Press, 1991) ISBN 978-0810824805
- A Comprehensive History of Mauritius: From the Beginning to 2001 (M.D.S., 2001) ISBN 978-9990329964
- A New Comprehensive History of Mauritius, Volume 1: From Prehistory to the Birth of Parliament in 1886 (2012) ISBN 978-1977760371
- A New Comprehensive History of Mauritius, Volume 2: From British Rule to the 21st Century (2012) ISBN 978-9994934928
