= Marie Danielle Selvon =

Mauritian barrister

Hon. Marie Danielle Selvon MP

Member of the National Assembly
- In office 2014–2015
- Constituency: Grand River North West and Port Louis West
- In office 2019–2019
- Constituency: Grand Baie and Poudre d'Or

Personal details
- Party: Alliance Lepep (2014); Reform Party (2019)
- Spouse: Sydney Selvon
- Children: Stéphane et Mélody
- Profession: Barrister

Marie Danielle Selvon, also known as Danielle Selvon, is a Mauritian politician and barrister who served as MO from 2014-15 and in 2019.

== Political career ==
In 2014, Marie Danielle Selvon was elected as a Member of Parliament for Constituency No 1, representing the Alliance Lepep (MSM). During her tenure, she advocated for civil liberties, constitutional integrity, and the sovereignty of Mauritius over the Chagos Archipelago. Selvon has been a voice in the campaign for justice for the Chagossian people and has called for concerted actions to address the historical injustice perpetrated by the British colonial power.

=== Resignation from MSM ===
In December 2015, Selvon resigned from her position in the MSM. The “highly controversial "Good Governance and Integrity Reporting Bill," which would amend the Constitution and grant extrajudicial authority to a politically appointed agency under the Ministry of Good Governance to handle "unexplained wealth," was the impetus behind this resignation.

=== New political party ===
In 2019, Selvon contested elections under the Reform Party but was not elected.

== Advocacy and activism ==
Outside of her political endeavors, Marie Danielle Selvon is a barrister with a focus on legal advocacy and activism. Marie Danielle Selvon has been an advocate for Mauritius' sovereignty over the Chagos Archipelago. She has emphasized the importance of national unity and concerted actions in reclaiming Mauritius' sovereignty over the illegally excised territory. Selvon has called for collaboration with international bodies, including seeking arbitration from the International Court of Justice, to address the Chagos issue. Marie Danielle Selvon participated in a joint press conference held by the leaders of Linion Pep Morisien and Rassemblement Mauricien. During the conference, Nando Bodha announced plans for a peaceful demonstration in front of Newton Tower. The demonstration happened the following Monday and demanded the resignation or dismissal of Maneesh Gobin in the wake of the Stag Party affair. Selvon, along with other new members, including lawyer Mahen Saulick and Ashwin Dookun, President of the Pharmaceutical Association of Mauritius, joined the platform in support of this initiative. Jean-Claude Barbier, a member of Linion Pep Morisien (LPM), raised concerns about the situation in Agalega during the press conference. Barbier emphasized the importance of transparency and accountability regarding reports of a military base on the island, as highlighted by the Indian media. He urged the Prime Minister to provide clarity on the situation in Agalega, stating that the people of Mauritius have a right to know about developments on the island.

== Personal life ==
Selvon resides on Royal Road in Grand-Gaube.
