= Friends of the British Overseas Territories =

U.K. charitable organization

- Flag of Friends of The British Overseas Territories
- Abbreviation: FOTBOT
- Founded: 2013; 13 years ago
- Type: UK Registered Charity
- Registration no.: 1156763 (England and Wales)
- Location: London, United Kingdom
- Region served: United Kingdom and British Overseas Territories
- Chief Executive: James Lunn
- Website: fotbot.org

Friends of the British Overseas Territories (FOTBOT) is a UK registered charity that seeks to raise awareness of the British Overseas Territories (BOTs) and raise funds for community projects.

== Foundation and development ==
The organisation was founded in 2013; initially as a vehicle to foster ties between the young people of the United Kingdom and the British Overseas Territories (BOTs).

The South Atlantic news agency MercoPress has described FOTBOT as an organisation with charitable aims, founded mainly by students and other young people, that hosts political debates and organises fringe meetings at party political conferences.

== Advocacy ==
FOTBOT has opposed the UN's decolonisation process, claiming that "there is no demand from any of the BOTS for a model of self-governance that would meet the UN's definition". It has called for the BOTs "to have direct representation in the House of Commons as well as in the Lords." but also holds the view that while the territories should remain British, they should be allowed "to pursue their economic, social and cultural development” independently of UK and international law.

In 2016 FOTBOT argued that residents of all the BOTs, should have the same right as Gibraltans to vote in the EU referendum. In 2018 it opposed the introduction of registers of beneficial ownership in the BOTs and accused the British Government of acting like "a colonial master" when it proposed them. In 2021 FOTBOT lobbied for changes to the proposed Nationality and Borders Act 2022 to allow British citizenship by descent for the children of unmarried fathers born in the BOTs. In 2026 the organisation opposed increases in remote gaming duty, claiming that they would have a "devastating impact" on the Gibraltar economy.

FOTBOT campaigns against the transfer of sovereignty of the British Indian Ocean Territory/Chagos Islands to Mauritius. The organisation stated on GB News that the islands "have been British since 1814 and we intend for them to remain that way". In the Morning Star it was quoted as saying "we are working with a wide range of groups to unite against it." FOTBOT describes the largest island, Diego Garcia, as an "unsinkable aircraft carrier" and claims that the people expelled from the islands were not a "native population." However, it believes that the descendants of those expelled should be "recognised as British Citizens and given reparations."

== Political allies ==
Friends of the British Overseas Territories is independent and politically neutral. In the House of Lords Crossbencher Arlene Foster has declared she is an advisor to FOTBOT. Several other politicians have declared their support for the organisation, including Labour MP Sharon Hodgson, Reform UK MP Andrew Rosindell, former Conservative Home Secretary Priti Patel, and Julia Reid, a Reform UK member who was the UKIP MEP for the South West and Gibraltar. In 2025, FOTBOT and Great British PAC carried out an online consultation of the Chagossian people, which was reported to the House of Lords by the Conservative Peer, Lord Callanan.

== Outreach work ==
The results of the 2025 online consultation were used to assist Chagossians opposed to the transfer of sovereignty to form a Chagos government in exile. 1,300 people from the Chagossian diaspora participated. In 2026 FOTBOT announced that for a period, all funds raised by it would be used to support legal action related to sovereignty of the Chagos islands.

In February 2025 FOTBOT organised a visit to the Falkland Islands during which the delegation met local representatives, toured the Islands and hosted a reception. FOTBOT has also sent delegations to St Helena and Gibraltar.

In 2026, FOTBOT facilitated a visit by the Government of Montserrat’s UK Office to Northern Ireland during St Patrick’s week, aimed at strengthening links with political, civic and academic stakeholders in Belfast.

== Youth work ==
Established originally as a youth charity, FOTBOT oriented its early activities toward educating young people. This work facilitated short excursions for British students to BOTs, and provided opportunities for students from the BOTs to visit other British territories and study in the UK. In 2018 FOTBOT was a partner in a project headed by geographer Stewart McPherson, Treasure Islands, designed to "showcase the wildlife, cultures and history of all of the UK Overseas Territories" by dispersing educative materials across the UK. Historically, FOTBOT societies in at least two student unions, Cambridge and Newcastle have been affiliated.

== Other activities ==
FOTBOT hosts regular ticketed events that range from formal functions to round-table discussions surrounding the cultural and political situation of the BOTs. FOTBOT is registered with the Charity Commission.
