= Chagossian Government‑in‑Exile =

Unrecognised Chagossian government-in-exile

Chagossian Government-in-Exile
- Emblem

- Map of the British Indian Ocean Territory
- Formation: 16 December 2025
- Type: Self-declared government-in-exile; unrecognised (Note: See Recognition.)
- Purpose: Resettlement of the Chagos Islands under British sovereignty; opposition to the transfer of sovereignty to Mauritius
- Location: United Kingdom; Île du Coin (from February 2026)
- Coordinates: 5°27′S 71°46′E
- Official language: English; Chagossian Creole
- Interim First Minister: Misley Mandarin
- Website: biotchagos.com

The Chagossian Government-in-Exile, also called the Chagossian Government and, since 2026, the Chagossian Interim Government or Government of the Chagos Islands, (Note: For the names, see Names.) is a self-declared government of Chagossians, formed in the United Kingdom in December 2025. It was set up after a poll of Chagossians in the UK organised by the Great British Political Action Committee, in which Misley Mandarin was chosen as interim "first minister"; its stated aim was to oppose the transfer of the Chagos Archipelago to Mauritius and to seek the islanders' return under British sovereignty. It is at odds with the Mauritius-based Chagos Refugees Group, which supports the agreement concerning the Chagos Archipelago including Diego Garcia between the United Kingdom and Mauritius.

The body is unrecognised. Asked in the House of Commons in December 2025 whether the British government recognised it, a Foreign Office minister said that he was not familiar with it "in any great detail". The Attorney General of Mauritius contested its legitimacy, and according to Olivier Bancoult of the Chagos Refugees Group, no government, neither the British nor the Mauritian, recognises Mandarin as first minister.

On 16 February 2026 Mandarin and three other Chagossians landed without permits on Île du Coin, in the Peros Banhos atoll of the British Indian Ocean Territory (BIOT), intending to settle there. The territory's Supreme Court blocked their removal by an interim injunction and, on 31 March 2026, quashed the removal notices and section 9 of the territory's constitution, while holding that their presence was illegal; the effect of that decision was stayed pending an appeal heard in July 2026. A British minister called it "a dangerous political stunt".

== Names ==
The body was announced in December 2025 as the "Chagossian government-in-exile". In evidence to the BIOT Supreme Court in March 2026, Mandarin said that he had been elected "First Minister of the Chagos Government, then described as being government in exile". After the landing he told Reuters, "I am not in exile anymore. This is my homeland." On 22 April 2026 the group announced the establishment of a "Chagossian Interim Government". Its website describes it as the "Government of the Chagos Islands". In October 2026 PA Media referred to it as "the unrecognised Chagossian government".

== Background ==
Britain separated the Chagos Archipelago from Mauritius in 1965, three years before Mauritian independence, and later established a military base with the United States on Diego Garcia. Between 1968 and 1973 it removed an estimated 1,400 to 1,700 Chagossians, many of whom were resettled in Mauritius and the Seychelles, with others later moving to the United Kingdom. Many of those in Britain settled in Crawley, West Sussex.

On 22 May 2025 the United Kingdom and Mauritius signed a treaty under which Mauritius would exercise sovereignty over the archipelago while the UK kept the Diego Garcia base for an initial 99 years. Article 6 provides that Mauritius "is free to implement a programme of resettlement on the islands of the Chagos Archipelago other than Diego Garcia". Chagossians are divided over the agreement: the Chagos Refugees Group supports it, while some Chagossians in the United Kingdom oppose it. On 13 April 2026 the British government told the Commons that a change in the US position had made it "impossible to agree at political level" an update to the 1966 UK–US exchange of notes needed for ratification; the implementing legislation could not complete its passage in the 2024–26 session. In October 2026 the government told the House of Lords that "an agreement with Mauritius must protect UK interests and command US support" and that it would "return to the Bill in due course". On 23 October the House of Lords gave a second reading to a private member's bill introduced by Lord Weir of Ballyholme, which would restrict any transfer of sovereignty "without the approval of Parliament and without the consent of the Chagossian people"; the government opposed it, rejecting "the Bill's call for a referendum". As of November 2026 the treaty had not entered into force.

== Formation ==
In December 2025 the Great British Political Action Committee, which supported the Chagossians' call for self-determination, organised a poll asking Chagossians in the UK whether they should form a government in exile and appoint an interim first minister. According to The Telegraph, around 1,300 Chagossians responded and "overwhelmingly" backed both proposals; Mandarin was the only candidate, and the process was overseen independently by the polling firm Whitestone Insight. Mandarin later told the BIOT court that "kind supporters offered to conduct a poll", in the hope that the government would consult the Chagossians "if we had a Government".

In an inaugural speech reported on 16 December 2025, Mandarin declared the formation of the government-in-exile "Not in rebellion. Not in anger." He said that the Chagossians wished to return to the islands and to remain British citizens under British sovereignty, and that they should have the same right to self-determination as other overseas territories; the body said it would draw up a charter and a representative council. The Telegraph reported that the organisers hoped the declaration would persuade the House of Lords to block the treaty.

In January 2026 Mandarin called on President Donald Trump to block the agreement, according to the Mauritian press.

== Aims and structure ==
In its statement of 22 April 2026, the group said the Interim Government had three mandates: to support the "organised and equitable resettlement" of displaced Chagossian families, to "uphold the rule of law" during a transitional period, and to protect the islands' environment. It described a framework modelled on other British Overseas Territories, with domestic matters such as housing, health and infrastructure for the Interim Government and defence and foreign affairs remaining with the United Kingdom. Mandarin was quoted as saying "We remain proudly British."

Its website lists Mandarin as Interim First Minister and nine further posts, among them an attorney general and ministers for resettlement, home affairs and immigration, and UK relations, all shown as "To be announced". Al Jazeera reported in October 2026 that Mandarin and his supporters favour resettlement under British rather than Mauritian sovereignty and have received backing from Reform UK. During a row between the Conservative and Reform UK leaders in October 2026, Reform UK released a statement from Mandarin saying that the Conservatives "cannot be trusted by the Chagos people".

== Recognition ==
In October 2026 the British news agency PA Media described the body as "the unrecognised Chagossian government" and Mandarin as its "self-proclaimed interim first minister". L'Express has also called him the "autoproclamé" (self-proclaimed) First Minister.

=== United Kingdom ===
On 16 December 2025, in a Commons debate on Chagossians, Richard Tice of Reform UK asked: "Do the British Government recognise the Chagossian Government in exile?" The Foreign Office minister Hamish Falconer replied that there was "a range of views across the Chagossian community", and that he was "not familiar with the Government in exile in any great detail". After the BIOT Supreme Court's judgment of March 2026, the Foreign, Commonwealth and Development Office referred to those on the island as "the Mandarin Group" and called their arrival "an irresponsible political stunt that has wasted tax-payers' money and put people's lives at risk".

=== Mauritius ===
Mauritius's Attorney General, Gavin Glover, contested the legitimacy of the government-in-exile in an official statement on 18 December 2025. According to Afrik.com, the Mauritian government insisted that the Chagossians are an integral part of the Mauritian people, and regarded the attempt to create a dissident political entity as legally unfounded. (Note: Afrik.com's words: « cette tentative de créer une entité politique dissidente est juridiquement infondée » ("this attempt to create a dissident political entity is legally unfounded"; translation).)

=== Chagos Refugees Group ===
In January 2026 Olivier Bancoult, leader of the Chagos Refugees Group, asked under what authority Mandarin proclaimed himself first minister of the Chagossian people. In April 2026 he said that, unlike the seven Chagossian representatives elected in Mauritius every two years under the supervision of the Electoral Commission, no one had supervised Mandarin's election, and that no government recognised him as first minister, "neither the English government nor the Mauritian government". (Note: Bancoult's words, as reported by L'Express: « Aucun gouvernement ne le reconnaît comme first minister, ni le gouvernement anglais ni le gouvernement mauricien » ("No government recognises him as first minister, neither the English government nor the Mauritian government"; translation).)

=== Supporters ===
Opponents of the treaty in Parliament have spoken of the body in favourable terms. In February 2026 the MP Andrew Rosindell described Mandarin as "the first minister appointed by the Chagossian people". A private member's bill introduced in the House of Lords in June 2026 would require "the consent of the Chagossian people" for any transfer of sovereignty (see Parliament).

== Île du Coin ==
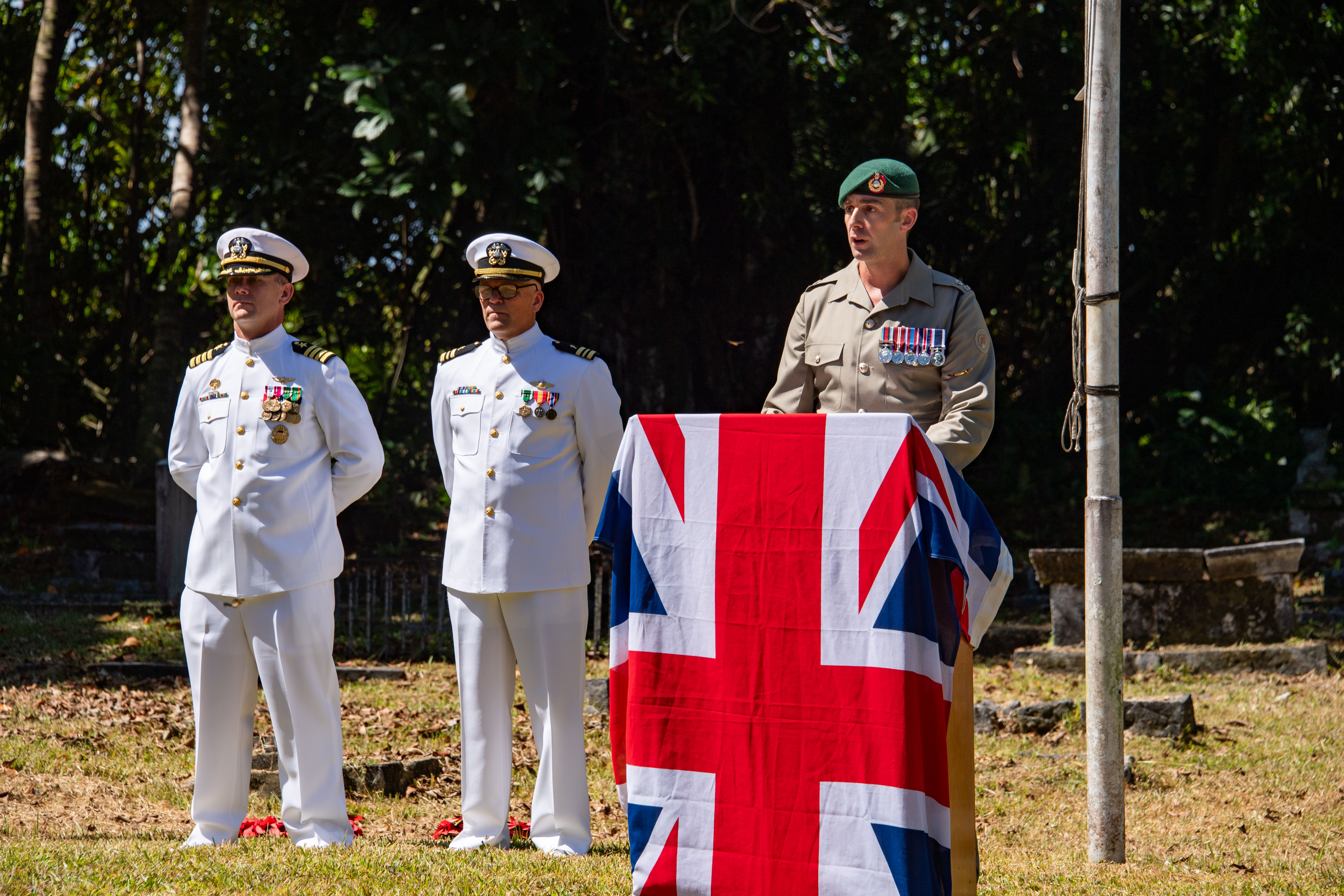
Royal Marines Major Peter Goddard, Acting Principal Immigration Officer of the BIOT, issued the removal notices on 18 February 2026.

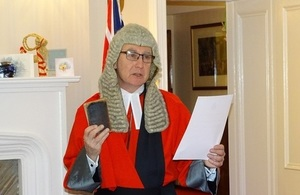
James Lewis KC, Chief Justice of the BIOT, granted the interim injunction against removal on 19 February 2026 and gave judgment on 31 March 2026.

=== Landing ===
On 16 February 2026 Mandarin, his father Louis Michel Mandarin, Louis Antoine Lemettre and Guy Castel landed on Île du Coin from a yacht that had entered the territory's waters without permission. They were accompanied by Adam Holloway, a former Conservative MP who had joined Reform UK, who, according to L'Express, had helped raise funds and organise the return. Mandarin said the group aimed to prevent the transfer of sovereignty to Mauritius, and that he wanted the 322 people who, he said, had been born in the islands and were still alive "to come home before they die". He also sought to reassure the United States that the settlement did not threaten the base on Diego Garcia. After landing, the group issued a "Declaration of Return", stating "We are the advance party."

On 18 February the territory's Acting Principal Immigration Officer issued removal notices to the four under the BIOT (Immigration) Order 2004, under which unlawful presence is an offence punishable by up to three years' imprisonment, a £3,000 fine, or both. A spokesperson for the Foreign, Commonwealth and Development Office said that "It remains both illegal and unsafe to enter the outer Chagos islands without a valid permit". The same day Trump wrote on social media that the land "should not be taken away from the UK"; the BBC reported his post alongside the landing of the four, who said they would refuse to leave.

On 19 February the Chief Justice of the territory, James Lewis KC, granted an interim injunction preventing execution of the removal notices pending judicial review, on an application by their lawyer, James Tumbridge. The Independent quoted him as saying: "They are 120 miles from Diego Garcia and pose no threat to national security on the evidence before me."

=== Continued presence ===
Two further people who had arrived on the yacht went ashore on 26 February 2026 and remained on the island. On 2 March the Commissioner offered to take those on the island to the Maldives on the territory's patrol vessel, subject to the operator's permission; the offer was not taken up. L'Express reported in July 2026 that six Chagossians were living on the island. The territory's appropriation ordinance for 2026–27, made on 15 June 2026, includes £3,000,000 for "Ile du Coin-Related Costs" out of a total of £11,500,000. In September 2026 Radio One reported that Mandarin, camping on Peros Banhos with four other people since February, had told Chagossians in a social-media broadcast that the legal and legislative fight in the United Kingdom would be long.

== Litigation ==
=== BIOT Supreme Court ===
In a judgment of 31 March 2026 on the claim brought by the four, Lewis CJ held that section 9 of the British Indian Ocean Territory (Constitution) Order 2004, which provides that no person has the right of abode in the territory, was "an unlawful and irrational exercise of the prerogative", and quashed it. He also quashed the removal notices, which had to be redetermined by a fair procedure, but held that the claimants had entered and were staying on the island illegally and that "Nothing in this decision creates a right for the Claimants to set up a permanent camp on the Ile du Coin without the necessary permits". The claimants were represented by Philip Rule KC, James Tumbridge and Susana Ferrín, instructed by Keystone Law.

The court gave the Commissioner permission to appeal and stayed the effects of the declaration and quashing orders pending the appeal; the interim injunction was continued. Mauritius's Attorney General told L'Express that the judgment did not mean that the group had a right to stay, and that it confirmed that they were there illegally.

=== Court of Appeal ===
The Commissioner's appeal was heard by the British Indian Ocean Territory Court of Appeal, sitting in London, from 15 to 17 July 2026. Before the hearing the claimants' solicitors wrote to the British authorities asking about a 2022 visit to Peros Banhos, reported by The Guardian, at which a group put up a flagpole and sang the Mauritian national anthem, and whether permits had been issued for it. During the hearing L'Express quoted Mandarin as saying: "If self-determination is a human right for every other people on Earth, then it must be a human right for the Chagossians too." On 4 November the court gave notice that it would hand down judgment on 12 November 2026.

=== High Court ===
Mandarin and his father were also claimants, with Bertrice Pompe, in judicial review proceedings in the High Court in London against the government's failure to consult Chagossians before agreeing the 2025 treaty; their claim had been issued in June 2025, before the group was formed. On 10 March 2026 Mrs Justice Stacey refused permission and dismissed the claims.

== Parliament ==
On 5 June 2026 the DUP peer Lord Weir of Ballyholme introduced the British Sovereignty Protection (Chagos Islands) Bill in the House of Lords, a private member's bill to restrict any transfer of sovereignty over the territory "without the approval of Parliament and without the consent of the Chagossian people"; its second reading was listed for 23 October 2026. The group welcomed the bill, and Mandarin said that "no decision about the future of the Chagos Islands can be legitimate without our consent".

== Reactions ==
=== United Kingdom ===
The UK government's position is that the treaty is "the only viable path to resettlement on the archipelago", and the Foreign Office has described unauthorised landings as illegal and unsafe while saying it is working with Mauritius to resume heritage visits. Falconer told the Commons that Chagossians "do not speak with one voice" and that the government was trying to listen to all of their views. On 13 April 2026, asked whether the government would speak to "the Chagossians who have just come on the boat", the minister Stephen Doughty called the landing "a dangerous political stunt that is putting lives at risk" and said that it was "not safe or proper to be on those islands".

=== Mauritius ===
After Mandarin's appeal to Trump in January 2026, Glover said that some London-based Chagossians were clearly not patriots, and he described the landing in February as a "publicity stunt organised to create a situation of conflict with the British government". (Note: Glover's January remark was made in French: « Ce sont des personnes qui ne sont clairement pas des patriotes » ("These are people who are clearly not patriots"; translation).)

=== Chagos Refugees Group ===
Bancoult called Mandarin's appeal to Trump "une véritable trahison" (a real betrayal) of the Chagossian people and of Mauritius. He said that politicians opposed to the treaty were using Mandarin for their own careers. According to Bancoult, the Chagos Refugees Group, representatives of Chagossians in Seychelles, the Chagos Islander Movement and the UK Chagossian Council support the treaty. In October 2026 Al Jazeera described the Chagos Refugees Group as "at odds" with Mandarin and his supporters.

== See also ==
- Chagos Refugees Group

== Sources ==
=== Court decisions ===
- R (Mandarin and others) v HM Commissioner for the British Indian Ocean Territory (Supreme Court of the British Indian Ocean Territory 31 March 2026), Text.
- R (Mandarin and others) v HM Commissioner for the British Indian Ocean Territory: Order (Supreme Court of the British Indian Ocean Territory 31 March 2026), Text.
- "Cause list, 15–17 July 2026: HM Commissioner for the British Indian Ocean Territory v The King (on the application of Mandarin & Ors), [2026] BIOT CA (Civ) 1" (PDF). British Indian Ocean Territory Court of Appeal. 2026.
- "Notice of judgment hand down: His Majesty's Commissioner for the British Indian Ocean Territory v The King (on the application of Mandarin & Ors), [2026] BIOT CA (Civ) 1" (PDF). British Indian Ocean Territory Court of Appeal. 4 November 2026.
- R (Pompe) v Secretary of State for Foreign, Commonwealth and Development Affairs; R (Mandarin) v Secretary of State for Foreign, Commonwealth and Development Affairs, EWHC (Admin) 529 (High Court 10 March 2026).

=== Official documents ===
- Agreement between the Government of the United Kingdom of Great Britain and Northern Ireland and the Government of the Republic of Mauritius concerning the Chagos Archipelago including Diego Garcia (CS Mauritius No.1/2025, CP 1334) (Report). Foreign, Commonwealth and Development Office. 22 May 2025.
- "Chagossians: Trust Fund and Resettlement". Hansard, House of Commons. 16 December 2025.
- "Diego Garcia and British Indian Ocean Territory". Hansard, House of Commons. 25 February 2026.
- "Diego Garcia Military Base and British Indian Ocean Territory Bill". Hansard, House of Commons. 13 April 2026.
- "Diego Garcia Military Base and British Indian Ocean Territory Bill". Hansard, House of Lords. 13 October 2026.
- "British Sovereignty Protection (Chagos Islands) Bill [HL]". Hansard, House of Lords. 23 October 2026.
- "British Sovereignty Protection (Chagos Islands) Bill [HL]". UK Parliament.
- "British Sovereignty Protection (Chagos Islands) Bill [HL]: Stages". UK Parliament.
- British Indian Ocean Territory Special Gazette, Vol. LVIII, No. 2 (Appropriation (2026–2027) Ordinance 2026) (PDF) (Report). British Indian Ocean Territory Administration. 23 June 2026.

=== News and other sources ===
- Arjanee, Ameerah (2 October 2026). "UK-Mauritius Chagos sovereignty deal stalls amid fears of further delays". Al Jazeera English.
- Clegg, Peter (25 May 2025). "Chagos Deal Is Done: Sovereignty Is Returned to Mauritius". E-International Relations.
- "Olivier Bancoult : « Une véritable trahison envers le peuple chagossien et l'État »". Le Défi Media (in French). 12 January 2026.
- Judoobar, Bryan (16 September 2026). "Peros Banhos : Mandarin et ses quatre acolytes comptent camper pendant encore 18 mois". Radio One (in French).
- "Ile Maurice: Des exilés défient la zone d'exclusion et annoncent une installation à Peros Banhos". L'Express (in French). 17 February 2026 – via allAfrica.
- "Ile Maurice: Bancoult veut faire entendre «la vraie voix» de la communauté à Londres". L'Express (in French). 28 April 2026 – via allAfrica.
- Lukiv, Jaroslav (18 February 2026). "Do not give away Diego Garcia, Trump tells UK in fresh attack on Chagos deal". BBC News.
- Lynch, David; Ng, Ellie (14 October 2026). "Badenoch and Farage both dig in amid row over Falklands-Chagos 'trade' proposal". Nation.Cymru. PA Media.
- Maddox, David (20 February 2026). "Starmer's Chagos Islands deal hits new crisis after judge blocks removal of islanders". The Independent.
- Maddox, David; Devlin, Kate (31 March 2026). "Starmer's Chagos deal dealt major blow as judge rules Chagossians have right to live on disputed islands". The Independent.
- Martin, Daniel (16 December 2025). "Chagos Islanders defy Starmer by forming government in exile". The Telegraph. Archived from the original on 17 December 2025.
- Nuckchhed, Vashish (1 April 2026). "Séjour illégal sur l'île du Coin : «Sursis» pour Misley Mandarin et les trois autres". L'Express (in French).
- Nuckchhed, Vashish (5 July 2026). "Ile Maurice: Londres veut faire annuler le sursis accordé aux Chagossiens de Peros Banhos". L'Express (in French) – via allAfrica.
- Nuckchhed, Vashish (17 July 2026). "Afrique: L'autodétermination au coeur des débats devant la Cour d'appel". L'Express (in French) – via allAfrica.
- Ouitona, Maceo (19 December 2025). "Chagos : Port-Louis face à la fronde du « gouvernement en exil »". Afrik.com (in French).
- "Britain issues removal orders to four who landed on Chagos atoll". Reuters. 18 February 2026.
- Shreedam, Keshav (18 February 2026). "Ile Maurice: Quatre exilés brisent la zone d'exclusion et veulent reprendre Peros Banhos". L'Express (in French) – via allAfrica.
- Stacey, Kiran (5 November 2026). "Burnham wants to 'recast' Chagos Islands deal after US resistance". The Guardian.
- "Four islanders land on remote Chagos atoll, hope to block UK-Mauritius deal". The Straits Times. Reuters. 18 February 2026.

=== Statements by the organisation ===
- "Official statement: Establishment of the Chagossian Interim Government". Government of the Chagos Islands. 22 April 2026.
- "Lord Weir Introduces Sovereignty Protection Bill in the House of Lords". Government of the Chagos Islands. 5 June 2026.
- "Government". Government of the Chagos Islands.
