= Local Democracy Reporting Service =

UK local journalism service

The Local Democracy Reporting Service (LDRS) is an initiative in the United Kingdom funded by the BBC. The scheme pays for the employment of journalists by local independent news outlets, in order to improve the coverage of issues relating to local democracy. Its core purpose is stated as being "to provide impartial coverage of the regular business and workings of local authorities in the UK, and other relevant democratic institutions such as mayoralties, combined authority areas, P&CCs, quangos, etc."

The scheme launched in 2017. As of the 2021 contracting round, 165 Local Democracy Reporters (LDRs) were employed by eighteen participating organisations, ranging from large bodies including DC Thomson, Reach plc, Newsquest and the Evening Standard, to smaller outlets such as Radio Exe and Social Spider, a community interest company which publishes three north London community newspapers.

Stories written by LDRs are pooled and can be used at no cost by over a thousand participating news organisations, including the BBC. LDRS stories have featured on national BBC radio and television news programmes. In the first four years of the scheme almost a quarter of a million stories were filed, with a peak of 1,321 in a seven-day period in September 2021.

== Similar schemes ==
The scheme has been replicated in New Zealand, Canada and Ireland.

== Bristol Mayor dispute ==
The scheme itself came into the news in June 2022, when the Mayor of Bristol, Marvin Rees and his council's head of external communications, Saskia Konynenburg, challenged the line taken by LDRS reporter Alex Seabrook in questioning the mayor's 9,200-mile (14,800 km) return flight to Vancouver to speak about climate change at a TED conference, and whether it was appropriate for a LDRS reporter, rather than “a journalist from a newspaper”, to be asking the question. Shortly afterwards it was reported that LDRS staff would not be allowed to attend the mayor's future press conferences, resulting in a boycott of those events by several local news outlets, as well as the BBC and ITV.
