= James Lewis (judge) =

British judge

The Honourable James Lewis KC
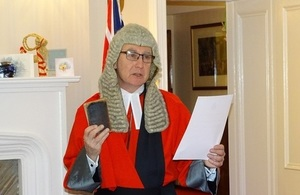
- Lewis in January 2018

Chief Justice of the Falkland Islands and the British Indian Ocean Territory
- Incumbent
- Assumed office 4 January 2018

Judge of the Supreme Court of South Georgia and the South Sandwich Islands, and of the British Antarctic Territory
- Incumbent
- Assumed office 2018

Personal details
- Born: 8 February 1958 (age 68)
- Education: Kingston Polytechnic

James Thomas Lewis KC (born 8 February 1958) is a British judge who has been Chief Justice of the Falkland Islands and the British Indian Ocean Territory, since 2018. He is Joint Head of Chambers at Three Raymond Buildings. He has also been a Deputy High Court judge since 2013, and a Judge of the Supreme Court of South Georgia and the South Sandwich Islands, and of the British Antarctic Territory, since 2018.

He was educated at The John Fisher School, Kingston Polytechnic (BSc), and City University (DipLaw). Following service in the Armed Forces, he was called to the bar at Gray's Inn in 1987, and took silk in 2002.

On 19 February 2026, he granted an injunction temporarily blocking the removal of four Chagossians on Île du Coin, Peros Banhos, in the Chagos Archipelago, who landed on the island three days prior, and had been served with a removal order from Royal Marines Major Pete Goddard, as Acting Principal Immigration Officer of the British Indian Ocean Territory. Chief Justice Lewis stated "there is no doubt the balance of convenience falls on the side of the claimants (the islanders). They are 120 miles from Diego Garcia and pose no threat to national security on the evidence before me".
