= Keystone Law =

London-based law firm

- Formerly: Lawyers Direct
- Traded as: AIM: KEYS
- Industry: Legal
- Founded: 2002
- Founder: James Knight; Charles Stringer
- Headquarters: London, United Kingdom
- Number of locations: 7
- Key people: James Knight (managing director); William Robins (operations director); Ashley Miller (finance director); Mark Machray (recruitment director); Kristina Oliver (marketing & business development director); Maurice Tunney (IT director)
- Number of employees: 440 lawyers, 45 support staff
- Website: www.keystonelaw.co.uk

Keystone Law (formerly Lawyers Direct; operating in Australia as Keypoint Law) is a national law firm headquartered in London, United Kingdom, with offices in several other countries, which offers legal services for business and individuals. The firm was established in 2002, operating under a business model wherein lawyers use a technology platform provided to work flexibly, rather than necessarily working in a physical office space maintained by the firm.

== History ==
=== Foundation and early growth ===
The firm was established in 2002 by solicitor James Knight, formerly with Trowers & Hamlins, and Charles Stringer, who was then Head of Sales at the BBC. They did so with the premise that it would provide legal services without the overhead inherent in maintaining an office environment for employees. The firm was initially called Lawyers Direct, and brought attention to itself through promotional efforts such as distributing 1,000 bags of peanuts at a Department of Trade and Industry awards ceremony with their logo and the slogan, "These days you have to be nuts to pay for overhead". In 2008, the firm re-branded as Keystone Law, due to concerns that it was overly associated with personal injury work, contrary to the broader and higher-level experience of many of the lawyers involved.

By 2011, the firm had developed an IT platform through which its lawyers were able to engage in remote work, reducing the costs of maintaining office space, and enabling lawyers to avoid the costs of commuting, allowing the firm to reduce customer costs. The company has office facilities for when face to face meetings are required. The Great Recession, which generally impacted traditional law firms negatively, created opportunities for the firm to expand its practice areas, with the addition of a healthcare law group in 2011. The firm had 70 lawyers as of 2008, 95 lawyers as of 2010, and 300 lawyers as of 2018. Lawyers are generally been recruited from other firms after garnering six to ten years of experience in practice, depending on the office, and do not have a set target for billable hours, instead being paid a percentage of the fees generated by their work.

=== Structural changes and international expansion ===
In October 2013, the firm converted to an Alternative Business Structure (ABS), making it the 173rd ABS to be approved by the Solicitors Regulation Authority, enabling the firm to offer a range of services in addition to law. It also allowed non-solicitor and co-founder Charles Stringer to become a director of the firm. Also in 2013, the firm implemented a recruitment campaign to attract partner-level lawyers to join the firm, increasing its headcount by 48% over the following year.

The firm formally launched operations in Australia on May 30, 2014, under the name Keypoint Law. The name selection was due to the unavailability of the Keystone name in Australia. In October 2014, the firm accepted £3.15m in investment from a private equity firm, Root Capital. Root acquired a 35% equity interest from Charles Stringer, one of the founding Partners.

In January 2016 Keystone announced the opening of an office on the Isle of Man, which required the establishment of a new law firm there, under local regulations. The move made Keystone the first UK law firm to establish a presence there in nearly 30 years. In November 2016, Legal Week named Keystone Law in their annual Best Legal Advisers report. The firm was positively reviewed by Chris Bull, who chaired the judging panel of the 2016 Eclipse Proclaim Modern Law Awards, in a 2016 interview in Modern Law Magazine.

Following the launch of its Isle of Man office, the firm opened an office in Northern Ireland through a commercial merger with existing Belfast firm McMahon McKay. In November 2017, Keystone announced plans to become the third law firm in the UK to be listed on the London Stock Exchange, with an initial public offering. The listing was carried out on November 27, 2017, with share prices rising by approximately 20% shortly thereafter.

== Accreditation ==
Keystone Law is a consistent recipient of industry awards, such as the Law Society Excellence Awards, and is annually recognised by Chambers and Partners (Guide to the world's best lawyers) and the Legal 500. The firm is also recognised as the UK's Best Legal Adviser in Legal Week and by the Lawyer UK 200.
