= Le Mauricien =

French-language newspaper in Mauritius

- Type: Daily newspaper
- Founded: 1908
- Language: French
- Website: lemauricien.com

Le Mauricien is a French-language newspaper, based and distributed in Mauritius. The newspaper, founded in 1908, is released daily and is one of the most read in Mauritius. The publishers, Le Mauricien Ltd., also publish Week-End, Week-End Scope and Turf Magazine. It is an independent newspaper.

== History ==
Le Mauricien celebrated its hundredth anniversary in 2008. Some of the former editors include Raoul Rivet, André Masson and Lindsay Rivière. The editor and director was Raoul Rivet from 1922 to 1957. Le Mauricien adopted the offset press in 1978 and subsequently experienced changes, namely by growing from four pages to the current 48-page daily edition. Its price has evolved as well. In 1978, the newspaper's office was set on fire which was later deemed as a criminal act. Le Mauricien adopted a "midi" format known as the Berliner format in 2010. The pages increased to 48, similar to leading papers elsewhere like Le Figaro (France), and The Guardian (UK). In 2012, Le Mauricien upgraded its website and aligned it with other papers where readers could send comments to published articles, this feature was later removed.

The Compact Tabloid Format

As from July 2014, Le Mauricien has adopted the compact tabloid format close to The Times of the UK. The pages have been reduced to 40 while the midi format was repealed. Compared to an older version of the same paper, the paper size is reduced by 55%. This adds to a new era in news publishing.

== General information ==
Le Mauricien headquarters is located on 8 rue St Georges, Port Louis. The current director is Jacques Rivet and deputy director is Bernard Delaître.

== See also ==
- List of newspapers in Mauritius
