= Radio One (Mauritius) =

Private Radio Station in Mauritius

Coordinates: 20.165768°S 57.500034°E

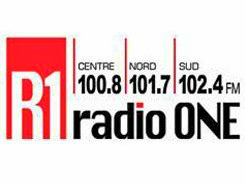
- Port Louis; Mauritius
- Broadcast area: Mauritius
- Frequencies: 101.7 MHz (East/West); 100.8 MHz (Centre); 102.4 MHz (North/South)

Programming
- Languages: Creole, English, French, Hindi
- Format: CHR

Ownership
- Owner: Viva Voce; (Private Commercial Free to Air FM Radio broadcasting license)

History
- First air date: 12 March 2002

Technical information

Links
- Webcast: https://www.radio1.mu/
- Website: https://www.radio1.mu/

Radio One (R1) is the first private radio station in Mauritius, owned and broadcast by Viva Voce Ltd. It started operations in 2002 with a Private Commercial Free to Air FM Radio Broadcasting Licence issued by the Independent Broadcasting Authority- Mauritius. Radio One is popularly known as the news and entertainment radio channel.

== Programs ==
=== On Weekday ===
- Matin Bonheur with Rj Mario
- Le Wake Up Show with Rj Louanna Lodoiska And Rj Andy Bignoux
- English News - Ayrece Steward
- Enquêtes en Direct with Christopher Sowamber
- Le Club with Rj Miguel and Radio One News Team
- Le13_15 with Rj Daniella Grandcourt
- Le 15-18 with Rj Jimmy Gassel
- Face A Face / Feature / Le Dossier / Nu La Vwa Nu Radio with Finlay Salesse, Emmanuel Eydou, Emilie Runga, Ashley Victor, Shazia Thupsee, Avinash Gopee
- TURF TALK with Andy Bignoux, Amize Assad, Shawn Louis
- Meli-Melo Wednesday with Rj Ursula
- Good Vibes Thursday with Rj Ursula
- Black Friday Friday 8pm-11pm with Rj Louanna / Miss Lou

=== On Weekend ===
- Le Morning Du Weekend with Rj Corinette
- Polémique with Finlay
- Planet Hits with Rj Ursula
- 100%Hits 80 with Rj Elvis
- Hit Radio One with Rj Riaz
- Radio One Arena with Fabrice Coiffic & Shawn Louis
- DJ & CO with Andy & Ruben
- Les Tubes Inoubliables with Rj Elvis
- Dimanche Culture with Rj Finlay
- Zwe Sa La Misik with Rj Mario
- Generation 80's with Rj Elvis
- A State of Trance with Armin Van Buuren
- Club Life with Tiesto
- Planet Perfecto with Paul Oakenfold
- UMF Radio
- Spinnin' Sessions (various DJs)

During the turf season, Horse racing are commented live on Radio One. (See also Champ De Mars Racecourse ) Radio One is the exclusive broadcaster of Spinnin sessions, Clublife, ASOT, Planet Perfecto, UMF Radio.

== Legal Matter ==
During the Municipal Elections 2012, Radio One along with 2 other radio stations Top FM and Radio Plus received a letter by the Independent Broadcasting Authority listing directives to follow the rules and regulations they owe to follow during the mentioned period. The Chairman of IBA accused Top Fm of suspected breaches penalizing the other two private radio in an interview in Le Defi Quotidien but the decision was challenged as Top FM state that they had so far communicated all and requesting the IBA to withdraw the new directives so that Radio Plus and Radio one could continue their phone-in programs.

La Sentinelle (Mauritius), one of the main shareholders of Viva Voce Ltd lost control on Radio One.

== See also ==
List of radio stations in Mauritius
