= Île du Coin =

Inhabited island in the Chagos Archipelago

Coordinates: 5.454551°S 71.767018°E

Disputed island
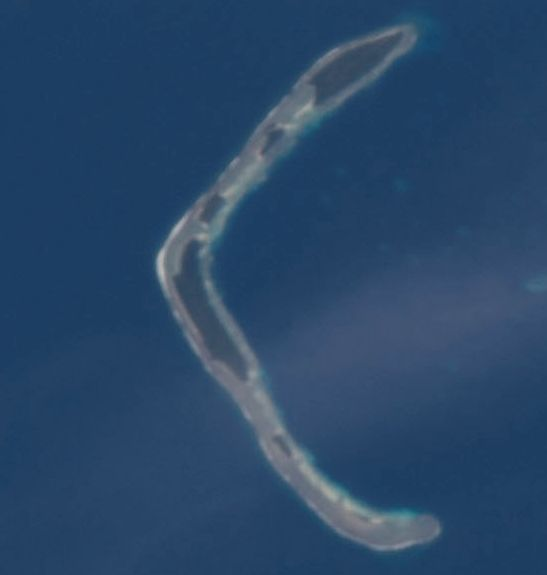
- Île du Coin (on the left) and surrounding islands, satellite picture

- Location of Île du Coin in Peros Banhos
- Interactive map of Île du Coin

Geography
- Location: Peros Banhos, Chagos Archipelago
- Area: 1.275 km^{2} (0.492 sq mi)

Administration
- United Kingdom; British Indian Ocean Territory

Claimed by
- Chagossian Government (unrecognised)
- Capital and largest settlement: Port Charles
- Leader: Misley Mandarin

Demographics
- Population: 6 (26 February 2026)
- Languages: Chagossian creole, English
- Ethnic groups: 6 Chagossians

Île du Coin, also known as Coin Island, is an island in the atoll of Peros Banhos in the Chagos Archipelago.

Île du Coin is the largest and most important island in Peros Banhos, with a length of 1.65 nautical miles (3.1 km) and an area of 127.5 hectares (315 acres) with a maximum height of about 2 metres. Until 1973 it was home to the Perch Settlement from where the coconut plantations of the atoll were run. This island was the main port of the atoll and had a jetty to load and unload merchandise. There is an abandoned church on the island and around 150 graves.

Abandoned coconut plantations form about 92% of the vegetation on the island. A rat infestation limits the number of breeding birds on the island.

In 2026, the island was resettled as part of a Chagossian-led attempt to keep the British Indian Ocean Territory under British rule, in opposition to proposals to cede the territory to Mauritius.

== 2026 resettlement ==
On 16 February 2026, four British Chagossians landed on Île du Coin to establish a permanent settlement, without seeking government permission. They became the first Chagossians to live on the islands since the expulsion of the Chagossians in 1971. An injunction by the Chief Justice of the British Indian Ocean Territory three days later prevented the immediate deportation of the islanders.
