= Camp Thunder Cove =

United States military base on Diego Garcia

Coordinates: 7.291°S 72.386°E

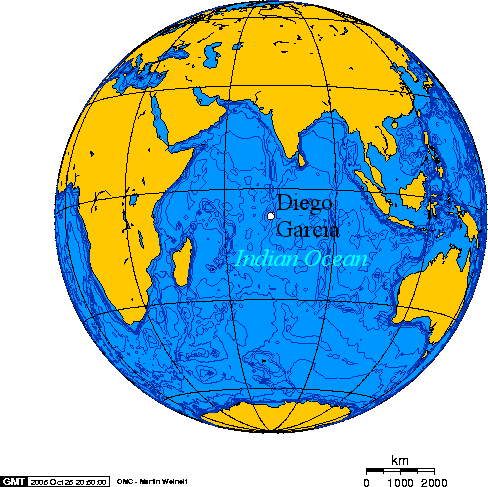
Orthographic projection centred over Diego Garcia.

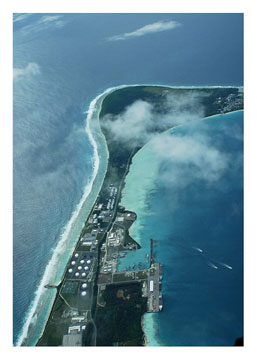
Camp Justice – Diego Garcia.

Camp Thunder Cove, formerly Camp Justice is a United States Navy and Air Force support facility within the US-UK Naval Support Facility on Diego Garcia, a small and isolated island in the Indian Ocean. The island is in the Chagos Archipelago, part of the British Indian Ocean Territory.

== Structure ==
United States forces have used Diego Garcia since at least the mid-1960s, under lease from the United Kingdom. The island has port facilities and an airstrip capable of handling large aircraft. Currently, 1,700 military personnel, mostly United States forces, with around 50 British troops, and a further 1,500 civilian contractors reside there.

The installation fills several roles including serving as a support facility for both surface fleets and submarine units in addition supplying regional operations in conjunction with Military Sealift Command. The base is also home to a sophisticated radar, space tracking and communications facility along with a fully operational joint Navy and Air Force airfield.

== History ==
Diego Garcia from the air.

Construction of Camp Justice was the impetus for the British government's expulsion of the Chagossians. The entire population of approximately 1,600 Chagossians were removed from 1967 to 27 April 1973, with limited financial compensation being paid out to the former inhabitants as well as several legal challenges.

Starting in 1990, the base saw another round of rapid improvement and expansion. US intervention in the Middle East resulted in the construction of two exceptionally long (2.3 mile) runways, heavy aircraft storage and maintenance facilities and a large fuel depot.

The camp was renamed "Thunder Cove" in July 2006.

A transfer agreement with Mauritius was signed on 22 May 2025, with the provision that the island of Diego Garcia would be leased back to the UK for at least 99 years. The UK government expects the treaty to be ratified near the end of 2025.
