= Flag of the British Indian Ocean Territory =

British Indian Ocean Territory
- Use: Civil ensign
- Proportion: 1:2
- Adopted: 8 November 1990; 36 years ago
- Design: A Blue Ensign with 7 wavy white stripes, with a palm tree on the hoist side and a crown over it.

The flag of the British Indian Ocean Territory is similar to the flags of other British dependencies and colonies as it has the Union Flag in the upper hoist-side corner. The palm tree and crown are symbols of the territory. The flag was initially intended to be used by the commissioner for the British Indian Ocean Territory but has gained semi-official status as a territorial flag for use on land.

== Design ==
The flag contains the Union Flag in its canton (upper hoist quarter). It depicts the waters of the Indian Ocean, where the islands are located, in the form of white and blue wavy lines. The flag also depicts a palm tree rising above the Tudor Crown.

The coat of arms of the British Indian Ocean Territory also bears the territory's flag.

== History ==
The British Indian Ocean Territory was established on 8 November 1965 when the Aldabra, Farquhar and Desroches islands, formerly part of the Crown Colony of Seychelles, were amalgamated with the Chagos Archipelago, formerly part of the Crown Colony of Mauritius. In 1976, the former Seychellois islands were ceded to Seychelles.

The flag was granted by Queen Elizabeth II on the 25th anniversary of the British Indian Ocean Territory's creation in 1990. It is that of the commissioner for the British Indian Ocean Territory and has only semi-official status as a territorial flag. It was designed for the commissioner, who is based at the Foreign, Commonwealth and Development Office in London.

In 2006, Naval Support Facility Diego Garcia, the main US Navy base in the territory (on the main island Diego Garcia), featured the flag in a promotional video. In one scene, the flag is shown flying on land within the base.

In 2025, the governments of the United Kingdom and Mauritius agreed to transfer sovereignty of the Chagos Archipelago to Mauritius with a 99-year lease to maintain the UK-US military presence on Diego Garcia. Chagos Islanders within the United Kingdom used the flag of the British Indian Ocean Territory to protest against the proposed transfer and expressed a desire for it to remain British with a referendum on self-determination.

Originally the crown on the flag was depicted as St Edward's Crown. In October 2025 the flag was formally updated with King Charles III’s preferred Tudor Crown. Between 25 February and 22 March 2026 the BIOT government's website changed to a new illustration which used the Tudor Crown.

== Other images ==
The flag as used from 1990–2025, with St Edward's Crown

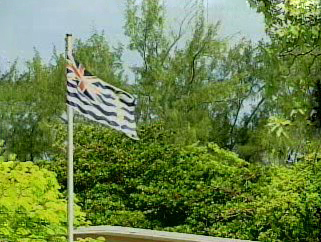
The flag flying on Diego Garcia

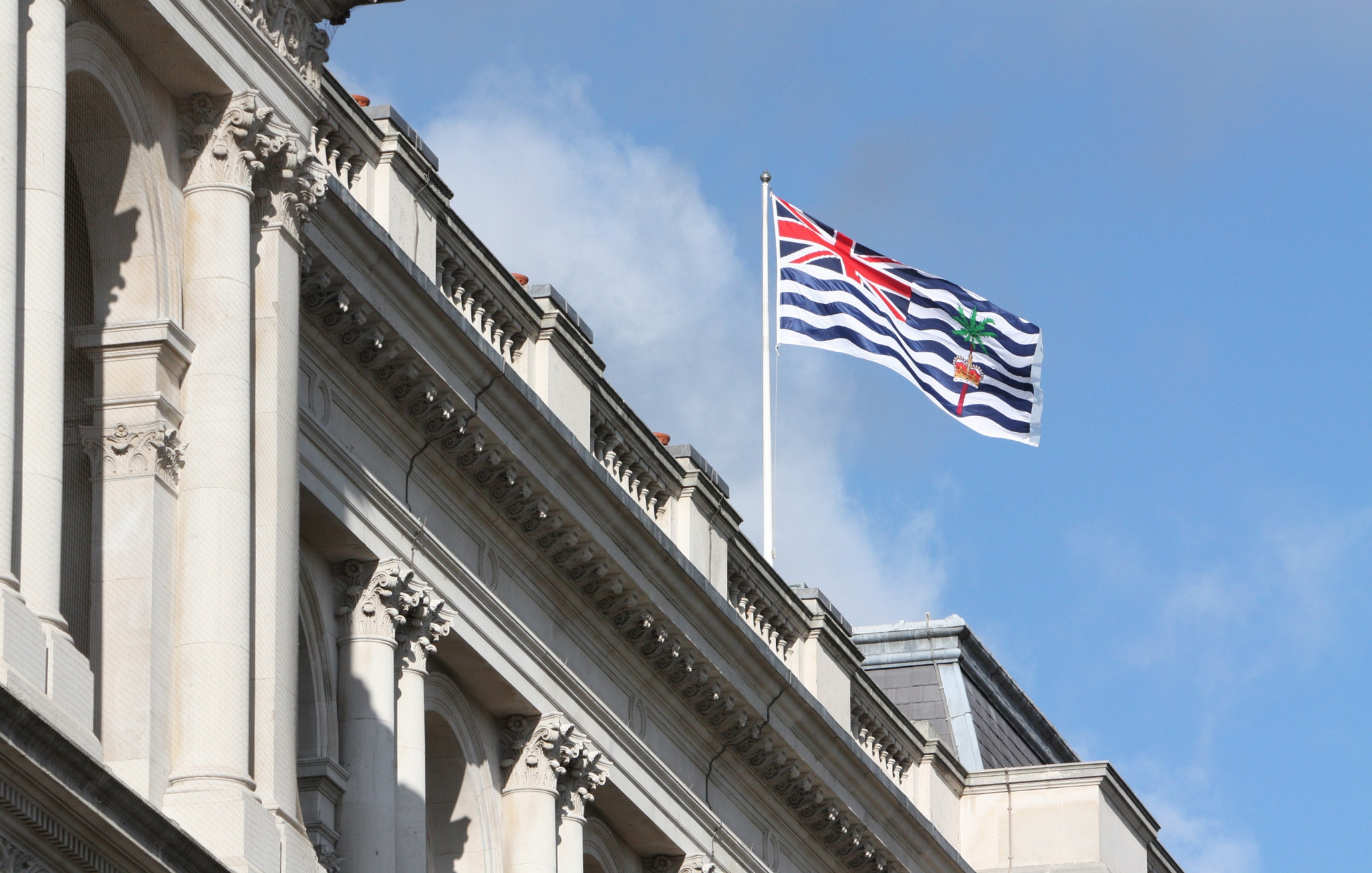
The flag flying on the Foreign Office building in London, November 2012.

== See also ==
- Coat of arms of the British Indian Ocean Territory
