= Naval Support Facility Diego Garcia =

British Indian Ocean Territory facility

Navy Support Facility Diego Garcia
- Diego Garcia in British Indian Ocean Territory
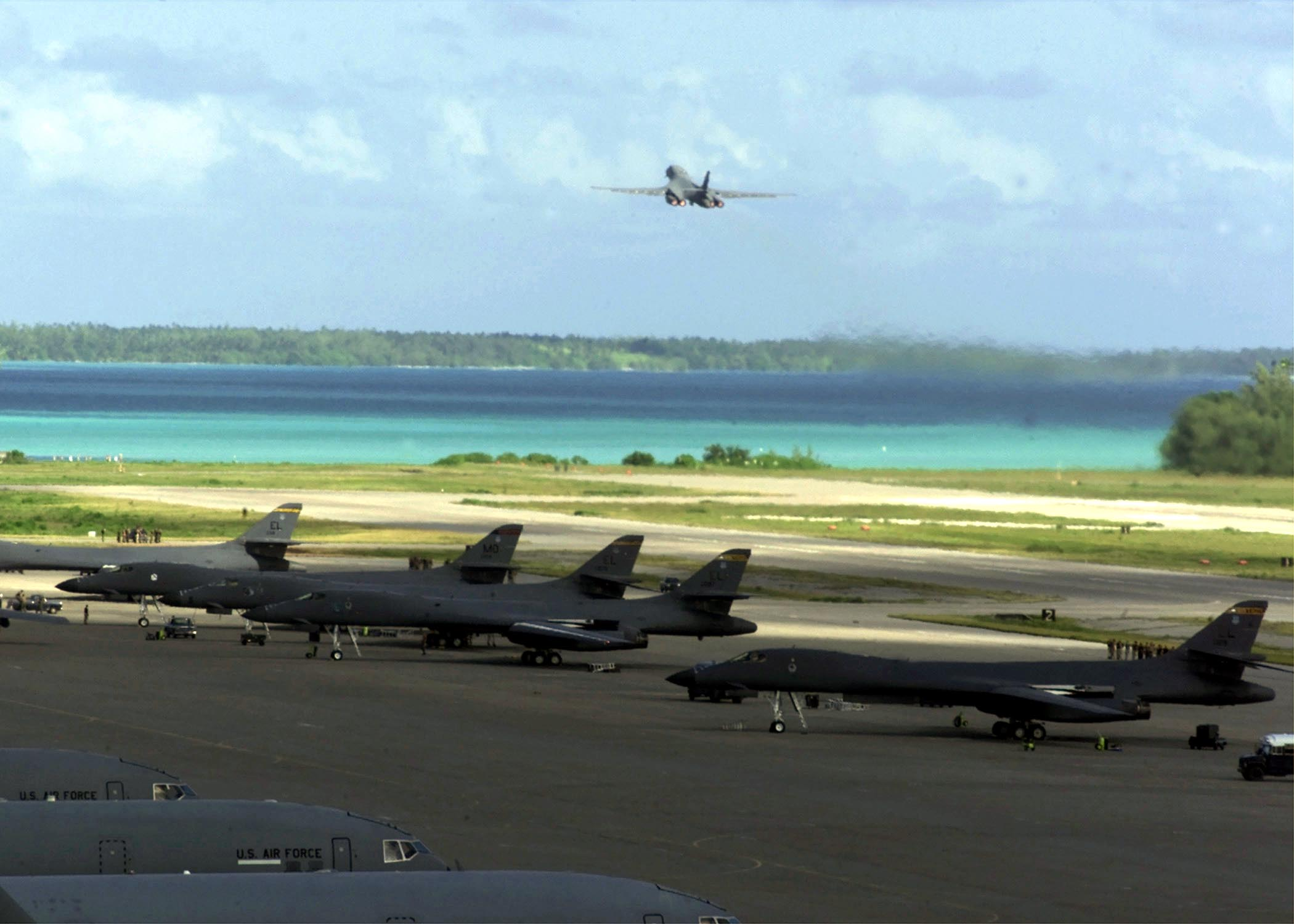
- A US Air Force B-1B Lancer taking off from Diego Garcia as part of Operation Enduring Freedom during October 2001. Five other B-1Bs are visible parked in the foreground.

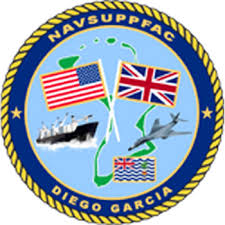

Site information
- Type: Naval Support Facility
- Owner: Ministry of Defence
- Operator: Royal Navy; United States Navy
- Controlled by: British Forces British Indian Ocean Territories; Commander, Navy Installations Command
- Condition: Operational
- Website: Naval Support Facility Diego Garcia (Archive link)

Location
- Location in the Indian Ocean
- Coordinates: 7°18′48″S 72°24′40″E

Site history
- Built: 1971 – 1976
- In use: 1976 – present

Garrison information
- Current commander: Captain Bill Guheen

Airfield information
- Identifiers: ICAO: FJDG, WMO: 619670
- Elevation: 4.1 metres (13 ft) AMSL
Runways
Direction	Length and surface
13/31	3,659 metres (12,005 ft) Concrete

Naval Support Facility Diego Garcia, abbreviated as NSF Diego Garcia, is a British Indian Ocean Territory facility used by the Royal Navy and leased to the United States Navy, located on the atoll Diego Garcia in the Indian Ocean. Camp Thunder Cove is part of the facility, and is operated by the United States Armed Forces and British Armed Forces.

The base was built between 1971 and 1976 following the expulsion of 2,000 Chagosians, descendants of imported plantation workers, from Diego Garcia and other islands in the Chagos Archipelago. In October 2024, the British government announced a deal that would see sovereignty over the Chagos Islands transferred to Mauritius and the Navy Support Facility Diego Garcia leased to the British government for an initial period of 99 years. In September 2026, Wes Streeting announced that the Chagos Islands deal would be placed under review following direct criticism from Donald Trump.

== Mission ==
NSF Diego Garcia provides Base Operating Services to tenant commands located on the island. The command's mission is "To provide logistic support to operational forces forward deployed to the Indian Ocean and Persian Gulf AORs in support of national policy objectives."

As of January 2012, the facility supported the following tenant commands:

- Maritime Pre-Positioning Ships Squadron TWO
- Branch Health Clinic
- Naval Computer And Telecommunications Station Far East Detachment Diego Garcia
- Naval Mobile Construction Battalion Detachment
- Naval Media Center Detachment Diego Garcia
- Military Sealift Command Office Diego Garcia
- Mission Support Facility
- Fleet Logistics Center Diego Garcia
- NAVFAC Public Works Department

== History ==
In 1971, the local population of Diego Garcia, the Chagossians, was forcibly expelled from the island to make way for the base.

The Navy tasked the Seabees of Naval Mobile Construction Battalions 1, 40, 62, 71, 133 and Amphibious Construction Battalion 2 with the construction of the base. On 23 January 1971 the first men of NMCB 40 arrived on site to begin what became an extended project. Naval Support Facility Diego Garcia, was established as the senior United States Navy command on the island on 1 October 1977. At the time the NAVCOMMSTA was the primary tenant, but as new major facilities were completed, most notably the expanded anchorage and mooring area and the extended airfield, other tenants were commissioned. In 1980, the United States Navy established the Near-Term Prepositioned Force of 16 ships. Then NTPF became the Afloat Prepositioning Force (AFP) and eventually Maritime Prepositioning Ship Squadron Two (MPSRON 2) consisting of 20 deep-water pre-positioned logistics ships anchored in the lagoon.

In 1981, the naval air facility was commissioned. It was decommissioned in 1987 and its responsibilities returned to the Naval Support Facility Diego Garcia.

In 1982, construction activities were transferred from the Seabees to a consortium of civilian contractors, Raymond International, and Brown and Root and Mowlem, a joint venture. Raymond had deep-draft wharf and waterfront skills, Brown and Root had concrete and infrastructure skills, and Mowlem was an English firm known for taking on challenging projects. The majority of the projects were completed by 1988.

On 26 March 1982, Barbara Shuping and five other women were assigned to the Naval Support Facility Diego Garcia. They were the first women to live on the island since the Chagossians were expelled in 1971.

In 1985, the new port facilities were completed and the USS Saratoga was the first aircraft carrier to tie up. Two years later, the Air Force's Strategic Air Command began deploying Boeing B-52 bombers and aerial refueling aircraft to the newly completed airfield facilities.

Following the Iraqi invasion of Kuwait in August 1990, three ships of COMPSRON 2 sortied, delivering a Marine Expeditionary Brigade to Saudi Arabia for participation in the Gulf War. Other COMPSRON 2 ships offloaded the ammunition and fuel on Diego Garcia that were required for the American bomber fleet that deployed to the airfield. Subsequently, B-52G bombers flew more than 200 17-hour bombing missions over 44 days and dropped more than 800,000 short tons (730,000 metric tons) of bombs on the Iraqi Armed Forces in Iraq and Kuwait. One of the B-52s, #59-2593, crashed from mechanical failures just north of the island with the loss of three of its six-man crew.

Beginning on 7 October 2001, the United States again commenced military operations from Diego Garcia using B-1, B-2, and B-52 bombers to attack Taliban and al-Qaeda targets in Afghanistan following the September 11 attacks on the World Trade Center and the Pentagon. The base played an important role in the invasion of Afghanistan until the U.S.-led coalition could establish forward bases in the country because many countries closer to Afghanistan such as Turkey, Pakistan, and Saudi Arabia refused to allow United States air bases in their territory to be used for combat operations. On 12 December 2001, a B-1 bomber was lost to mechanical failures just after takeoff from the island, but the crew survived and was rescued by the USS Russell. Four B-2 Shelter System Extra Large Deployable Aircraft Hangar Systems were erected at Diego Garcia to support the bombers' operations. Combat operations resumed in the spring of 2003, with MPSRON 2 sortieing to the Persian Gulf for the Iraq War, and bombing operations began again, this time against Iraq. Bomber operations ceased from Diego Garcia on 15 August 2006.

Iranian strikes in February 2026 destroyed much of Naval Support Activity Bahrain during the 2026 Iran war, making it ineffective as a US Navy major logistics hub. This caused NSF Diego Garcia to be chosen as the alternative logistics hub, though about 2,200 miles (1,900 nmi) from where aircraft carrier strike groups operated in the Gulf of Oman.

On 20 March 2026, Iran launched two ballistic missiles towards Diego Garcia, though both failed to hit the island. While one of the missiles broke apart mid-flight, another was intercepted by a SM-3 air defence missile launched by a US warship. Iran's Ministry of Foreign Affairs on Monday denied the allegations that it was behind the attack and that the missile launches were a “false flag” operation. He suggested that Israel might have been behind them. NATO Secretary-General Mark Rutte told CBS News that the alliance “cannot confirm” Israel's claim that the projectiles targeting the Diego Garcia airbase were Iranian intercontinental ballistic missiles. On 23 March, elements of the 31st Marine Expeditionary Unit trained for beach reconnaissance on the island.

== Based units ==
Flying and notable non-flying units based at Naval Support Facility Diego Garcia.

Units marked GSU are Geographically Separate Units, which although based at Diego Garcia, are subordinate to a parent unit based at another location.

=== United States Navy ===
  - Naval Computer and Telecommunications Station, Far East
    - Detachment Diego Garcia
  - Naval Support Facility Diego Garcia
  - Military Sealift Command
    - Maritime Pre-positioning Ship Squadron Two
  - Fleet and Industrial Supply Center
    - Diego Garcia Detachment

=== United States Space Force ===
  - Space Operations Command (SpOC)
    - Space Delta 2
      - 20th Space Control Squadron
        - Detachment 2 (GSU)
    - Space Delta 6
      - 21st Space Operations Squadron
        - Detachment 1 (GSU)

=== United States Air Force ===
  - Pacific Air Forces (PACAF)
    - Eleventh Air Force
      - 36th Wing
        - 36th Mission Support Group
          - Detachment 1 (GSU)
  - Air Mobility Command (AMC)
    - United States Air Force Expeditionary Center
      - 515th Air Mobility Operations Wing
        - 515th Air Mobility Operations Group
          - 730th Air Mobility Squadron
            - Detachment 1 (GSU)

=== Royal Navy ===
  - British Forces British Indian Ocean Territories
    - Naval Party 1022

== Military contracting ==
KBR runs base operations support services at Naval Support Facility Diego Garcia. Serco Inc., of Herndon, Virginia, operates and maintains the Ground-based Electro-Optical Deep Space Surveillance (GEODSS), which tracks deep-space satellites.

Recent construction in support of US military activities on Diego Garcia has included:

- Black Construction/Mace International JV building a 34-metre antenna facility (expected completed by April 2021) and two new 13-metre radomes (expected completed by February 2021).
- Black Construction/Mace International JV repairing deep-draft wharf infrastructure (expected completed by September 2023).
- San Juan-Black & Veatch International Ltd. JV, of Montrose, Colorado, repairing the north parking apron (expected completed by May 2022).
- SJC-BVIL moving underground the power and telephone lines that run from the Navy ammunition area to the Air Force ammunition area along DG1 (expected completed by September 2022).

Supplementary work at the facility includes Poole Fire Protection of Olathe, Kansas, testing and inspecting fire protection systems (June 2020 – June 2025); Jacobs/B&M JV architect-engineer services, specifically design, engineering, specification writing, cost estimating (July 2020 – July 2025); and InSynergy Engineering Inc. utility system studies (September 2020 – September 2025).
