= Naval Party (Royal Navy) =

Naval Personnel Tasked for an Operation or Exercise

The Royal Navy maintains a number of Naval Parties worldwide to support a number of operations and training activities:

== Current ==
Current Naval Parties are:

- Naval Party 1002 (NP1002) is the largest component of British Forces British Indian Ocean Territories located at the Permanent Joint Operating Base (PJOB) on Diego Garcia, in the British Indian Ocean Territory. The primary role of NP1002 is to act as the islands' civil administration.
- Naval Party 1005 (NP1005) is the grouping of Royal Navy exchange officers serving in the Royal Netherlands Navy
- Naval Party 1010 (NP1010) is the British Defence Liaison Staff in Ottawa, Canada.
- Naval Party 1011 (NP1011) is the Royal Navy detachment at the Atlantic Undersea Test and Evaluation Center, Miami, Florida. This is a U.S. Navy submarine test, evaluation, and exercise facility.
- Naval Party 1022 (NP1022) is the permanent Royal Navy posting at the British Defence Singapore Support Unit in Singapore. NP1022 is responsible for managing the British owned and funded naval repair and logistics support facility in support of the Five Power Defence Arrangements (FPDA). It is fuelled by the Ministry of Defence Fuels Group.
- Naval Party 1023 (NP1023) is the Royal Navy Liaison Office in the Gulf.
- Naval Party 1964 (NP1964) is the personnel posted to Joint Force Command Norfolk.
- Naval Party 2010 (NP2010) is deployed on the Falkland Islands.

== Defunct ==
Defunct Naval Parties include:

- Naval Party 1004 (NP1004) was the Royal Navy personnel attached to Headquarters Allied Forces Baltic Approaches
- Naval Party 1008 (NP1008) was the Royal Navy personnel conducting offshore surveys as part of the Civil Hydrographic Programme upon Ships Taken up from Trade (STUFT). These were: MV Sperus (1983), MV Bon Esprit (1983–1986), MV British Enterprise IV (1990–1991), and MV Marine Explorer (1993–1995).
- Naval Party 1016 (NP1016) was the Royal Navy personnel conducting inshore surveys as part of the Civil Hydrographic Programme upon Ships Taken up from Trade (STUFT). These were MV Proud Seahorse (1985–2000), and MV Confidante (2001–end of contract).
- Naval Party 1020 (NP1020) was the Royal Navy personnel who crewed the MV Northella, whilst it was in use as a navigation training ship from 1985 to 1994.
- Naval Party 1027 (NP1027) – Cyprus
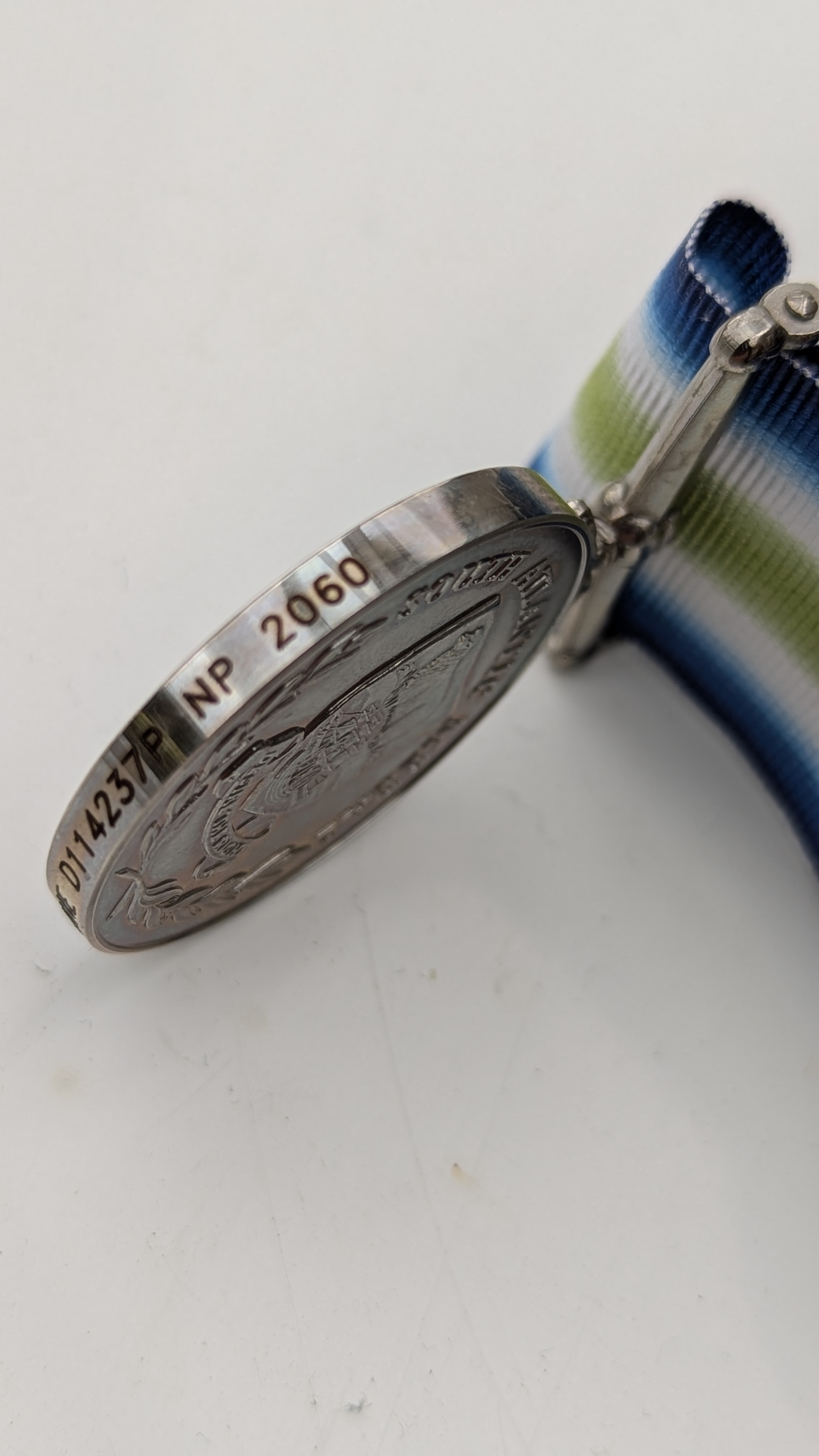
- Medal awarded to HM Forces embarked in NP2060 - 1982
  Naval Party 2060 (NP2060) - MV St Edmund - Ship Taken Up From Trade (STUFT) Falklands War, March 1982 - April 1984.
- Naval Party 8902 was a hovercraft unit formed in June 1967, made up of two officers and eight ratings, equipped with a modified Saunders-Roe SR.N.6 hovercraft. The unit evaluated the hovercraft around the Falkland Islands and demonstrated it in several South American countries.

== See also ==
- Standing Royal Navy deployments
- Overseas military bases of the United Kingdom
