= Coat of arms of the British Indian Ocean Territory =

Regional coat of arms

Versions
- Escutcheon-only version
- Armiger: Commissioner for the British Indian Ocean Territory; Monarch of the British Indian Ocean Territory
- Adopted: 1990
- Crest: In a Naval crown argent, a tower gules, masonry and cross sable. On the battlements thereof a staff, thereon flying to the sinister the territory's flag proper.
- Shield: Azure issuant from a water barry wavy in base proper a Palm tree surmounted by St. Edward's Crown also proper and a sun in splendour in the canton Or; In chief the Union Jack proper.
- Supporters: On the dexter a Hawksbill turtle and on the sinister a green turtle proper.
- Compartment: Sand and seashells proper.
- Motto: Limuria is in our trust
- Use: Coat of arms of the British Indian Ocean Territory

The coat of arms of the British Indian Ocean Territory was granted on 4 October 1990, by Royal Order of Queen Elizabeth II on the 25th anniversary of the territory's establishment. The flag's centrepiece represents the ocean, with the Union Flag and St. Edward's Crown representing British rule of the territory. The two species of turtle supporting the centrepiece represent the local wildlife.

== Significance ==
Coat of arms of the British Indian Ocean Territory (Type 1), Basic form and seal performance of the British Indian Ocean Territory Flag.

The centrepiece of the arms, the shield, bears a palm tree and St. Edward's Crown on a base of three white wavy lines representing the ocean, a sun in splendour in the upper-left corner, and the Union Flag in a chief at the top, representing the British rule of the territory. Two sea turtles are used as supporters (a hawksbill turtle and a green turtle), representing the local native wildlife. The crest comprises a naval crown through which rises a red tower, with a crosslet loophole shaped like the Holy Cross, bearing the territory's flag; there is no helm or mantling.

Although the Union flag is present on the coat of arms, on 22 May 2025, the UK Government agreed to return the Chagos Islands to Mauritius, with the continued operation of the British Naval base at Diego Garcia. The treaty makes no mention of the coat of arms, however, as the territory will cease to be under British rule, the coat of arms will likely become obsolete.

The motto is In tutela nostra Limuria, Latin for “Limuria is in our charge/trust”. This latinised name refers to the non-existent continent of Lemuria, once believed to have sunk beneath the Indian Ocean.

The palm tree and royal crown also feature in the flag of the British Indian Ocean Territory, which was granted to the territory on the same date as the flag.

The first coin issued by the British Indian Ocean Territory Coin Ordinance, in 2008, features the coat of arms, with an image of Queen Elizabeth II on the reverse side.

== See also ==
- Flag of the British Indian Ocean Territory
