= British Indian Ocean Territory =

British Overseas Territory in the Indian Ocean

- British Overseas Territory
- Flag Coat of arms
- Motto: "Limuria is in our trust"
- Anthem: "God Save the King" (Note: "God Save the King" is the national anthem by custom, not statute, and there is no authorised version. Typically only the first verse is usually sung, although the second verse is also often sung as well at state and public events. The words King, he, him, his, used at present, are replaced by Queen, she, her when the monarch is female.)
- Sovereignty: United Kingdom
- Detachment from British Mauritius: 8 November 1965
- Capital and settlement: Administered from London; Local government from Diego Garcia; 7°18′S 72°24′E
- Official languages: English
- Government: Directly administered dependency under a constitutional monarchy
  - Monarch: Charles III
  - Commissioner: Nishi Dholakia
  - Administrator: Mike Vidler
  - Commissioner's Representative ("BritRep"): Commander Tracy MacSephney

Government of the United Kingdom
  - Minister: Stewart Wood

Area
  - Total: 54,400 km^{2} (21,000 sq mi)
  - Water (%): 99.89
  - Land: 60 km^{2} (23 sq mi)

Population
  - Non-permanent (2018) estimate: ▲ c. 2,000 military personnel and contractors
  - Permanent (2026, disputed): 6
  - Density: 33.43/km^{2} (86.6/sq mi)
- Currency: US dollar ($; USD; de facto); Sterling (£; GBP; de jure)
- Time zone: UTC+06:00
- Mains electricity: 230 Volt, 50 Hertz
- Driving side: Right
- Calling code: +246
- UK postcode: BBND 1ZZ
- ISO 3166 code: IO
- Internet TLD: .io
- Website: biot.gov.io

The British Indian Ocean Territory (BIOT) is a British Overseas Territory situated in the Indian Ocean. The territory comprises the seven atolls of the Chagos Archipelago with over 1,000 individual islands, many very small, amounting to a total land area of 60 square kilometres (23 square miles). The largest and most southerly island is Diego Garcia, 27 square kilometres (10 square miles), the site of a Joint Military Facility of the United Kingdom and the United States. Official administration is remote from London, though the local capital is often regarded as being on Diego Garcia.

Mauritius claims that the British government separated the Chagos Archipelago from Mauritius, creating a new colony, the British Indian Ocean Territory (BIOT). There are ongoing negotiations on this dispute.

Since 1971, only personnel of the British and United States military and associated contractors have been legally allowed to live on the Chagos Islands. The forced removal of Chagossians from the Chagos Archipelago occurred between 1968 and 1973. The Chagossians, then numbering about 2,000 people, were expelled by the British government to Mauritius and Seychelles, even from the outlying islands far away from the military base on Diego Garcia. Despite calls from numerous human rights organisations, the British government has repeatedly denied Chagossians the right of return. In 2026, six Chagossians returned to Île du Coin in an attempt to reestablish a permanent settlement, without seeking government permission; their effort is being challenged in court. In March 2026, the BIOT Supreme Court ruled that the Chagossians had the right to live on the island, but the territorial administration is appealing the ruling.

Since the 1980s, the Government of Mauritius has sought to gain control over the Chagos Archipelago, which was separated from the then Crown Colony of Mauritius by the UK in 1965 to form the British Indian Ocean Territory. A 2019 advisory opinion of the International Court of Justice called for the islands to be given to Mauritius. Both the United Nations General Assembly and the International Tribunal for the Law of the Sea subsequently reached similar decisions. Negotiations between the UK and Mauritius began in 2022, and culminated in a 2024 understanding that the UK would cede the territory to Mauritius for possible resettlement while retaining the joint US-UK military base on Diego Garcia. While the ICJ and UN have supported decolonization of the islands, the UN Committee on the Elimination of Racial Discrimination has expressed "deep concern" at the terms of the deal, indicating that it does not go far enough to allow Chagossian people to exercise their cultural rights and preserve their cultural heritage, and that it forbids Chagossian settlements on the island of Diego Garcia.

A treaty was signed on 22 May 2025 that would formally transfer sovereignty of the territory to Mauritius once ratified, with the Diego Garcia military base remaining under British control during a 99-year lease. Following backlash from United States President Donald Trump in 2026, ratification has been suspended.

== History ==
Maldivian mariners knew of the Chagos Islands, which were known as Fōlhavahi in the northern Maldives and Hollhavai in the southern Maldives. Hollhavai also referred to other islands scattered throughout the Indian Ocean, such as the Seychelles. According to Southern Maldivian oral tradition, traders and fishermen were occasionally lost at sea and got stranded on one of the islands of the Chagos. Eventually they were rescued and brought back home. The coconut crabs of the islands may have inspired Maldivian folklore about giant hermit crabs. These islands were judged to be too far away from the seat of the Maldivian crown to be settled permanently. Thus for many centuries the Chagos were ignored.

=== Early settlement ===
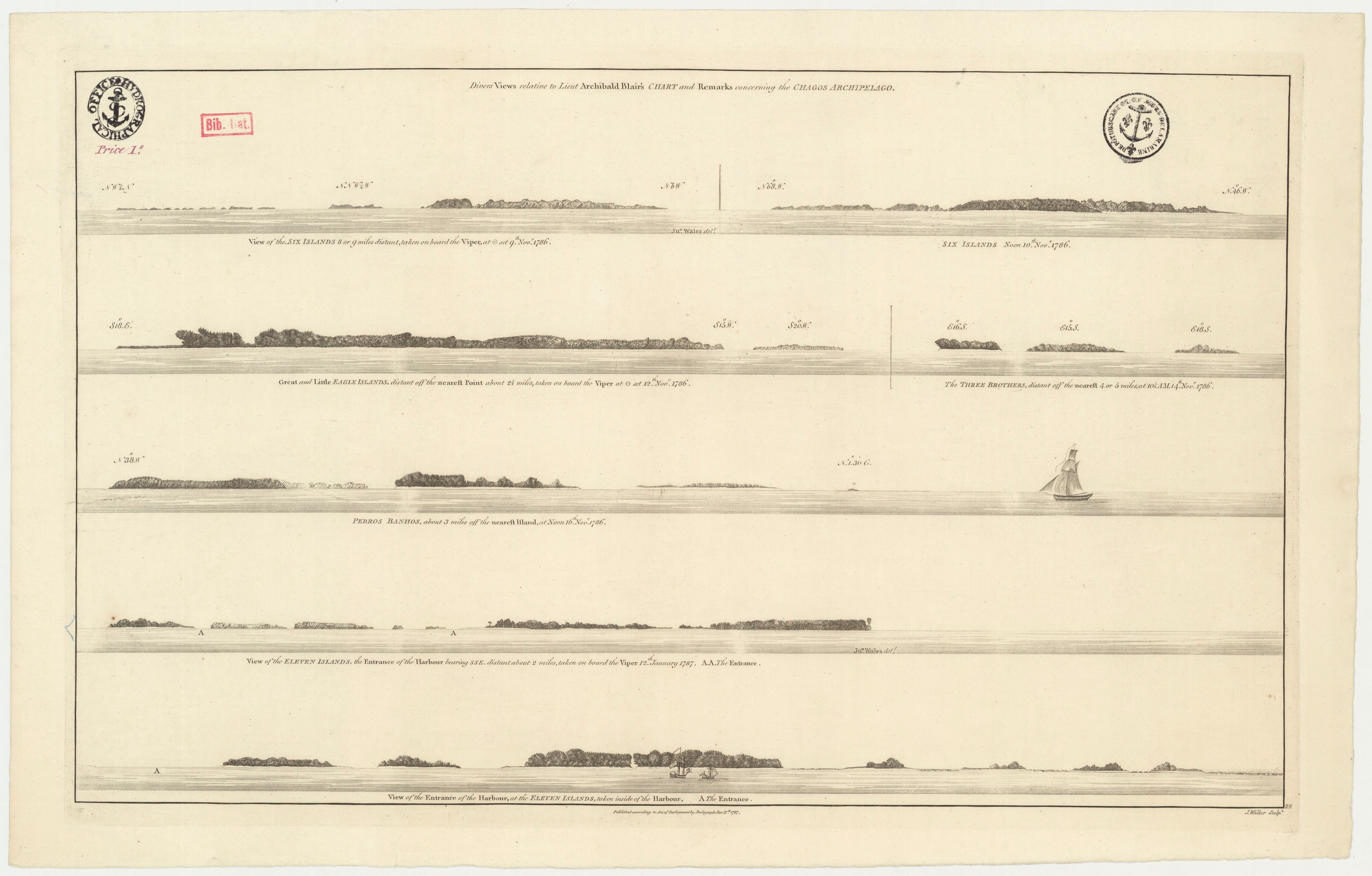
Views of the Chagos Archipelago from lieutenant Archibald Blair, 1787.

The islands of the Chagos Archipelago were charted by Vasco da Gama in the early 16th century, and then claimed in the 18th century by France as a possession of Mauritius. They were first settled in the 18th century by African slaves and Indian contractors brought by Franco-Mauritians to found coconut plantations. At some point Diego Garcia hosted a leper colony for patients from Mauritius, who were treated with turtle oil. In 1810, Mauritius was captured by the United Kingdom, and France subsequently ceded the territory in the 1814 Treaty of Paris.

Nautical chart of the Chagos Archipelago from captain of the East India Company's Indian Navy Robert Moresby, 1837.

The United Kingdom abolished slavery in 1833, although those on what would become the BIOT continued work as indentured labourers. In 1883 the plantations were bought by the Société Huilière de Diego et Peros. As of 1900, there were 426 families on the islands, 60 per cent descended from the original African-Malagasy slaves, and 40 per cent from South Asians brought over as indentured labour. Chagossian creole developed as a common language. The lives of the inhabitants remained effectively controlled by the company, a system which persisted until the 1960s.

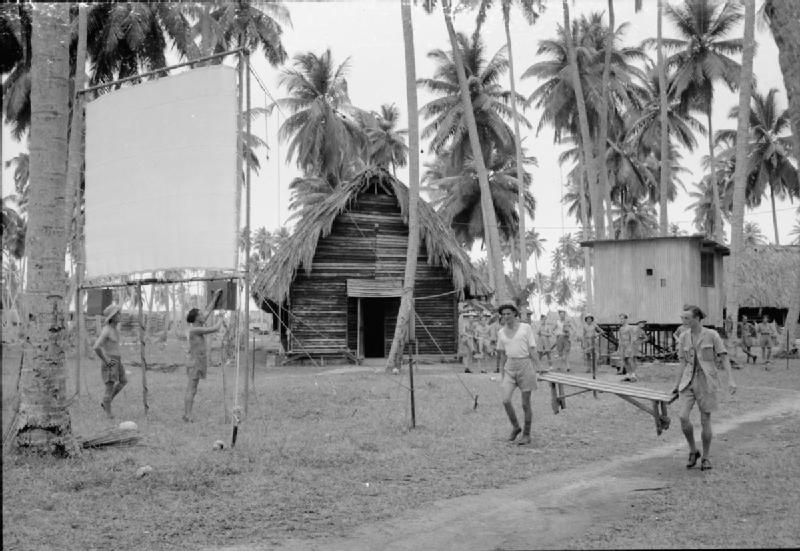
Royal Air Force base at Diego Garcia during World War II.

An airstrip was built on Diego Garcia during the Second World War, along with other military facilities. The military left once the war ended. In 1962 the plantations were bought by Chagos-Agalega Company, based in the Seychelles. At this time they covered 3,000 hectares (7,400 acres).

=== Formation ===
The descendants of those brought to the islands to farm coconuts had developed into the Chagossian people. There are no official population figures, but an estimate from 1968 found 866 inhabitants: 336 in Diego Garcia, 162 in the Salomon islands, and 168 in Peros Banhos. The vital statistics were likely similar to other Indian Ocean islands. The birth rate on the Chagos archipelago was probably around 48 in every 1000. The birth rate for the former Seychellois islands was nominally lower, likely due to inhabitants more easily able to travel to the Seychelles for medical needs. Mortality before the age of 1 was around 98 per 1,000 live births. The overall death rate probably averaged under 12 per 1,000 people. Housing was simple, mostly using local wood and coconut leaves, with some imported concrete and corrugated iron. Most water was captured from rain, although there were groundwater wells. The islands at this time produced not only copra from the plantations, but fish, and fruit in the case of the Chagos archipelago. Alcohol was produced for local consumption, from coconut, sugar cane, and other materials. It is likely there was some malnutrition.

Beginning in February 1964, the United Kingdom and the United States began secret talks about a military base in Diego Garcia. The United States wanted a territory with no local population, and the islands were lightly inhabited compared to other potential locations. The initial option of Aldabra was dropped due to international interest in its ecosystem. In 1965, the United Kingdom split the Chagos Archipelago from Mauritius and the islands of Aldabra, Farquhar, and Desroches (Des Roches) from the Seychelles to form the British Indian Ocean Territory (BIOT). The purpose was to allow the construction of military facilities for the mutual benefit of the United Kingdom and the United States. The islands were formally established as an overseas territory of the United Kingdom on 8 November 1965. While it initially sought for the base to be given on a lease, Mauritius was eventually paid £3 million to compensate for the territory's separation, under pressure due to then-ongoing independence negotiations. An additional £650,000 was paid in 1972 for relocation costs.

A few weeks after the decision to detach the Chagos Archipelago from Mauritius, the United Nations General Assembly passed Resolution 2066 on 16 December 1965, which stated that this detachment of part of the colonial territory of Mauritius was against customary international law as recorded earlier in the Declaration on the Granting of Independence to Colonial Countries and Peoples of 14 December 1960. This stated that "Any attempt aimed at the partial or total disruption of the national unity and the territorial integrity of a country is incompatible with the purposes and principles of the Charter of the United Nations".

Mauritius became an independent Commonwealth realm in March 1968, and subsequently became a republic, also within the Commonwealth, in March 1992.

=== Expulsion of the Chagossians ===
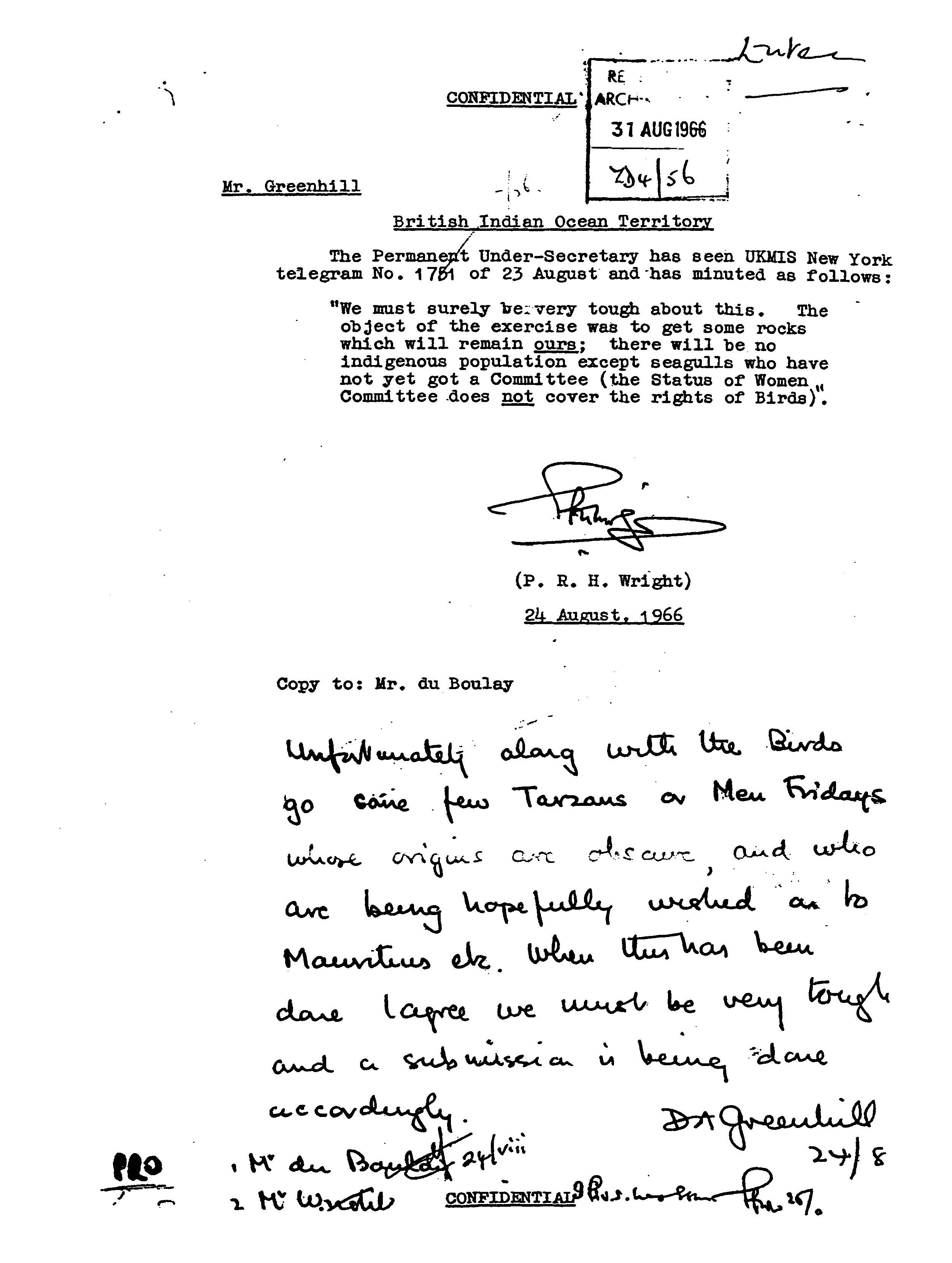
British diplomatic cable signed by D.A. Greenhill, 1966, relating to the depopulation of the Chagos Archipelago.

In April 1967, the British government purchased the privately owned copra plantations for £600,000 and closed them. Over the next five years, the British authorities removed the entire population of about 2,000 people, known as Chagossians (or Ilois), from Diego Garcia and two other Chagos atolls, Peros Banhos and Salomon Islands, to Mauritius and the Seychelles. The expulsion was carried out by preventing Chagossians who had left from returning from 1967, assisted by the Moulinie and Company (Seychelles), Limited company which the UK had set up to run the plantations. In 1968, when more workers were needed, non-Chagossian temporary workers were allowed in from the Seychelles. The remaining population was removed from Diego Garcia in January 1971, to meet a July 1971 deadline requested by the US. The populations of Peros Banhos and the Salomon Islands were removed starting from June 1972. The population as of 1965 was around 1,360 Chagossians, plus temporary workers from the Seychelles. Another few hundred Chagossians already lived outside of the islands. The UK informed the United Nations that BIOT had no indigenous population, meaning the UK would not have to send reports on the territory to the UN.

In 1971, the United Kingdom and the United States signed a treaty, leasing the island of Diego Garcia to the US military for the purposes of building a large air and naval base on the island. The deal was important to the British government, as the United States granted it a substantial discount on the purchase of Polaris nuclear missiles in return for the use of the islands as a base. The island was strategically located near oil shipping routes, and Iran. It would counter any Soviet threat in the region.

=== Development ===
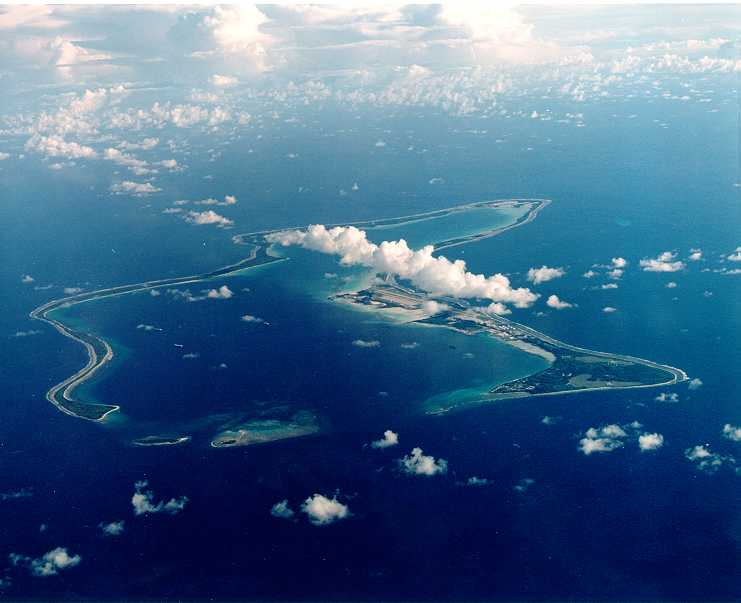
View of Diego Garcia, showing military base.

As of 1971, the population of Aldabra, Farquhar, and Desroches was 246. This dropped to 155 in 1975, likely reflecting uncertainty about these islands' future status. On 23 June 1976, these islands were returned to the Seychelles, which became independent as a republic on 29 June 1976; the islands now form part of the Outer Islands district of the Seychelles. Subsequently, the territory has consisted only of the six main island groups comprising the Chagos Archipelago.

Work on the military base commenced in 1971, with a large airbase with several long range runways constructed, as well as a harbour suitable for large naval vessels. Although classed as a joint UK/US base, in practice it is primarily staffed by the US military, although the UK maintains a garrison at all times, and Royal Air Force (RAF) long-range patrol aircraft are deployed there.

During the 1980s, Mauritius asserted a claim to sovereignty for the territory, citing the 1965 separation as illegal under international law, despite their apparent agreement at the time. The UK did not agree with the legal argument, but agreed to cede the territory to Mauritius when it was no longer required for defence purposes. According to the CIA World Factbook, the Seychelles also had a sovereignty claim on the islands. In 1982, the UK and US agreed waste would be shipped away from the territory. On 27 December 1984, Mauritius established an exclusive economic zone (EEZ) which included the waters around the BIOT, an action protested by the UK.

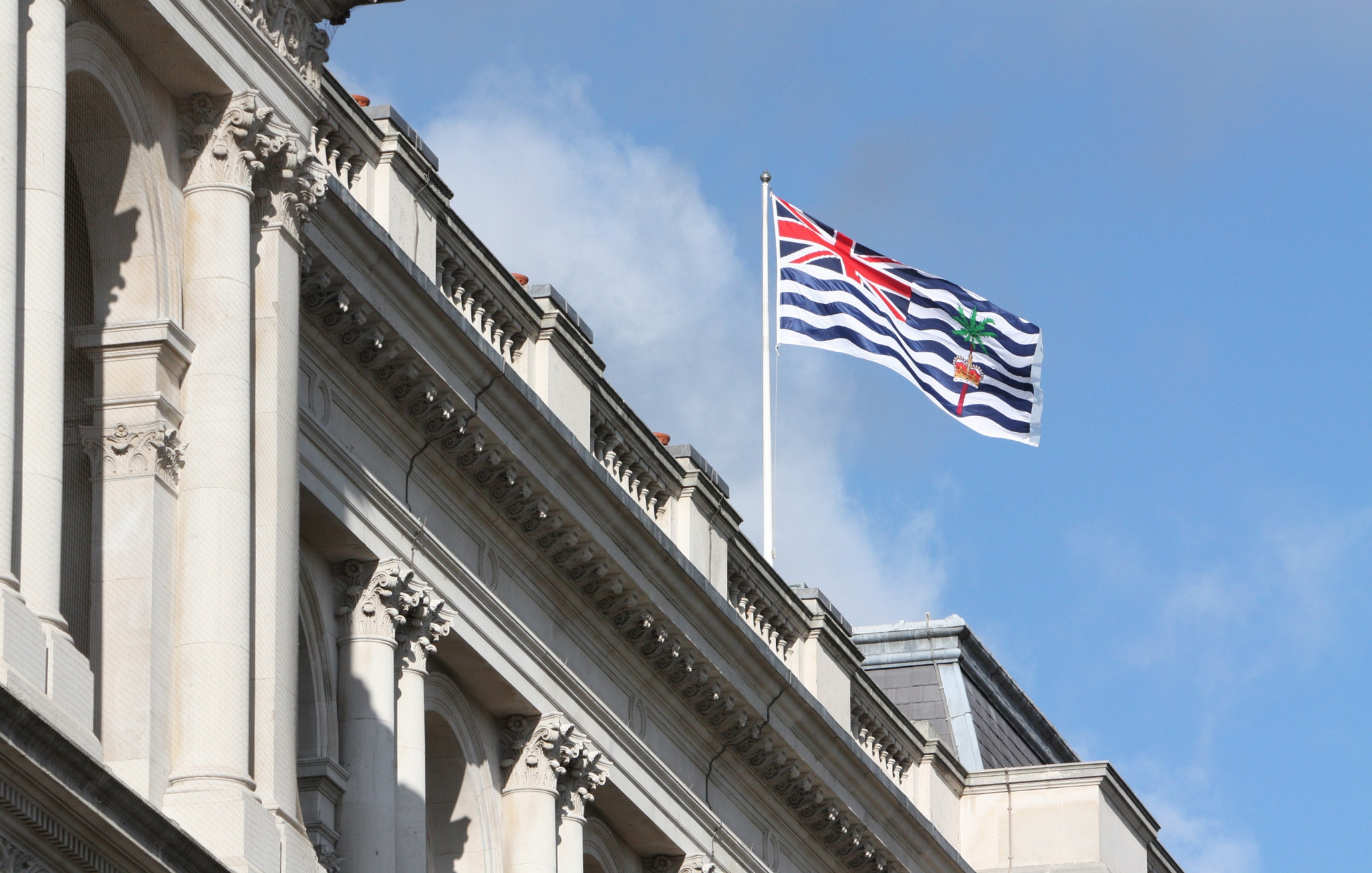
Flag of British Indian Ocean Territory.

In 1990, the first BIOT flag was unfurled. This flag, which also contains the Union Jack, has depictions of the Indian Ocean, where the islands are located, in the form of white and blue wavy lines and a palm tree rising above the British crown. During the Gulf War, 20 nuclear-armed Boeing B-52 Stratofortress bombers were stationed at the base as a nuclear deterrent. The base was also strategically positioned to support the 2001 War in Afghanistan and the 2003 Iraq War.

On 1 October 1991, the UK created the "BIOT Fisheries Conservation and Management Zone (FCMZ)" covering the territorial seas of the BIOT. On 4 December 1995, the UK signed the United Nations Fish Stocks Agreement on behalf of the BIOT, which was protested by Mauritius when it signed in 1997. Both Mauritius and the United Kingdom agreed to the inclusion of the BIOT within the area covered by the Indian Ocean Tuna Commission, which was formed in 1996. In 1996 the Mauritius Marine Conservation Society unsuccessfully sought to have the archipelago declared a World Heritage Site. Mauritius explicitly extended its ratification of the Nairobi Convention to the Chagos archipelago in 2000, although this had limited practical impact.

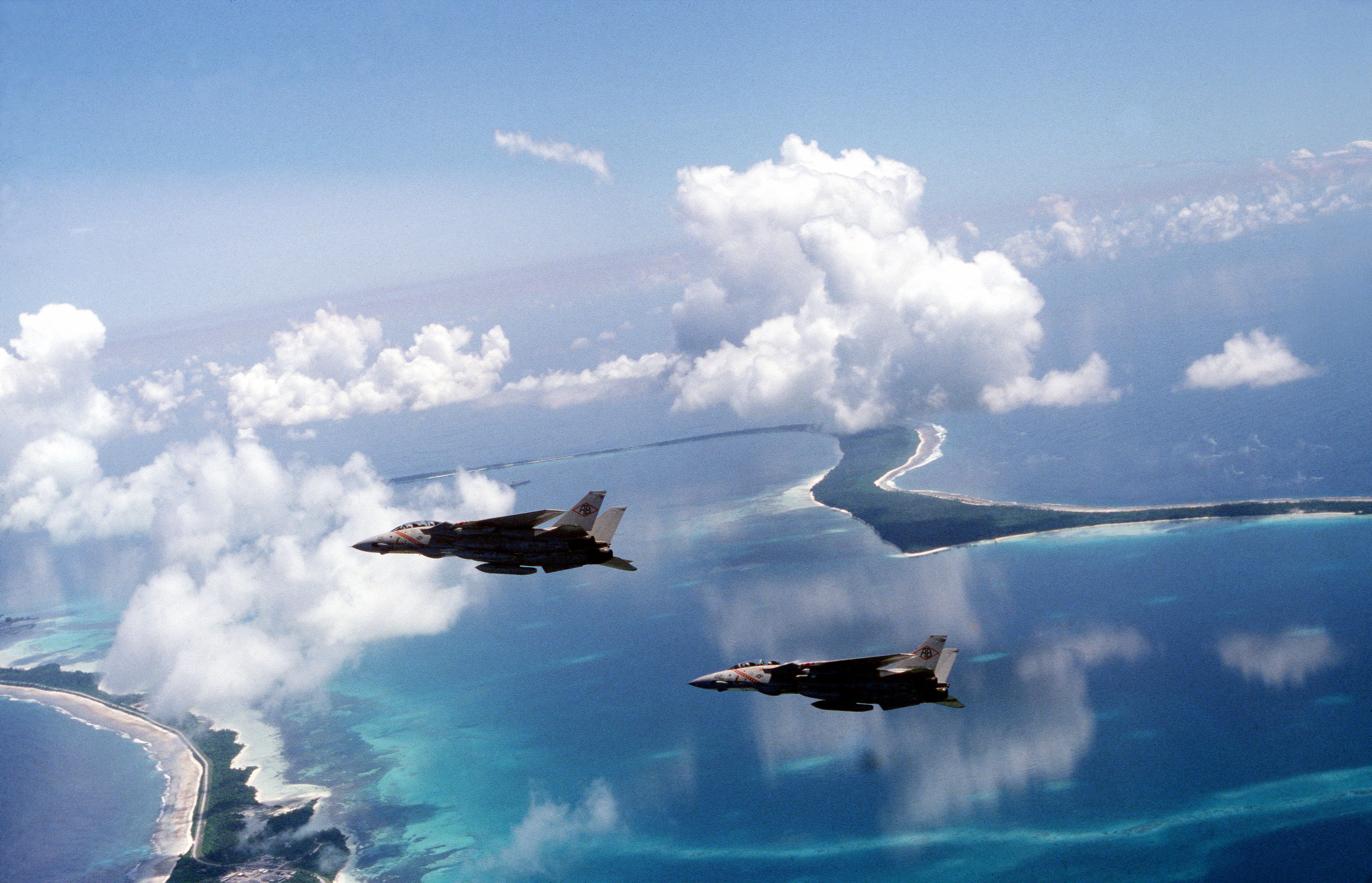
Two F-14 Tomcats fly over Diego Garcia.

The islanders, who now mainly reside in Mauritius and Seychelles, have continually asserted their right to return to Diego Garcia, winning important legal victories in the High Court of England and Wales in 2000, 2006, and 2007. In the High Court and Court of Appeal in 2003 and 2004, the islanders' application for further compensation on top of the £14.5 million value package of compensation they had already received was dismissed by the court. Following the 2000 ruling the British government announced that Chagossians would be permitted to return to the archipelago, aside from Diego Garcia. This position was reversed in 2004, before any had moved. The United Kingdom offered citizenship to some Chagossians starting in 2002.

On 17 September 2003, the UK created the "BIOT Environmental Protection and Conservation Zone (EPCZ)" covering the BIOT's EEZ. This was opposed by Mauritius, which on 5 August 2005 reasserted their declared EEZ surrounding the territory.

On 11 May 2006, the High Court ruled that a 2004 Order in Council preventing the Chagossians' resettlement of the islands was unlawful, and consequently that the Chagossians were entitled to return to the outer islands of the Chagos Archipelago. On 23 May 2007, this was confirmed by the Court of Appeal. In a visit sponsored by the British government, the islanders visited Diego Garcia and other islands on 3 April 2006 for humanitarian purposes, including the tending of the graves of their ancestors. On 22 October 2008, the British government won an appeal to the House of Lords regarding the royal prerogative used to continue excluding the Chagossians from their homeland.

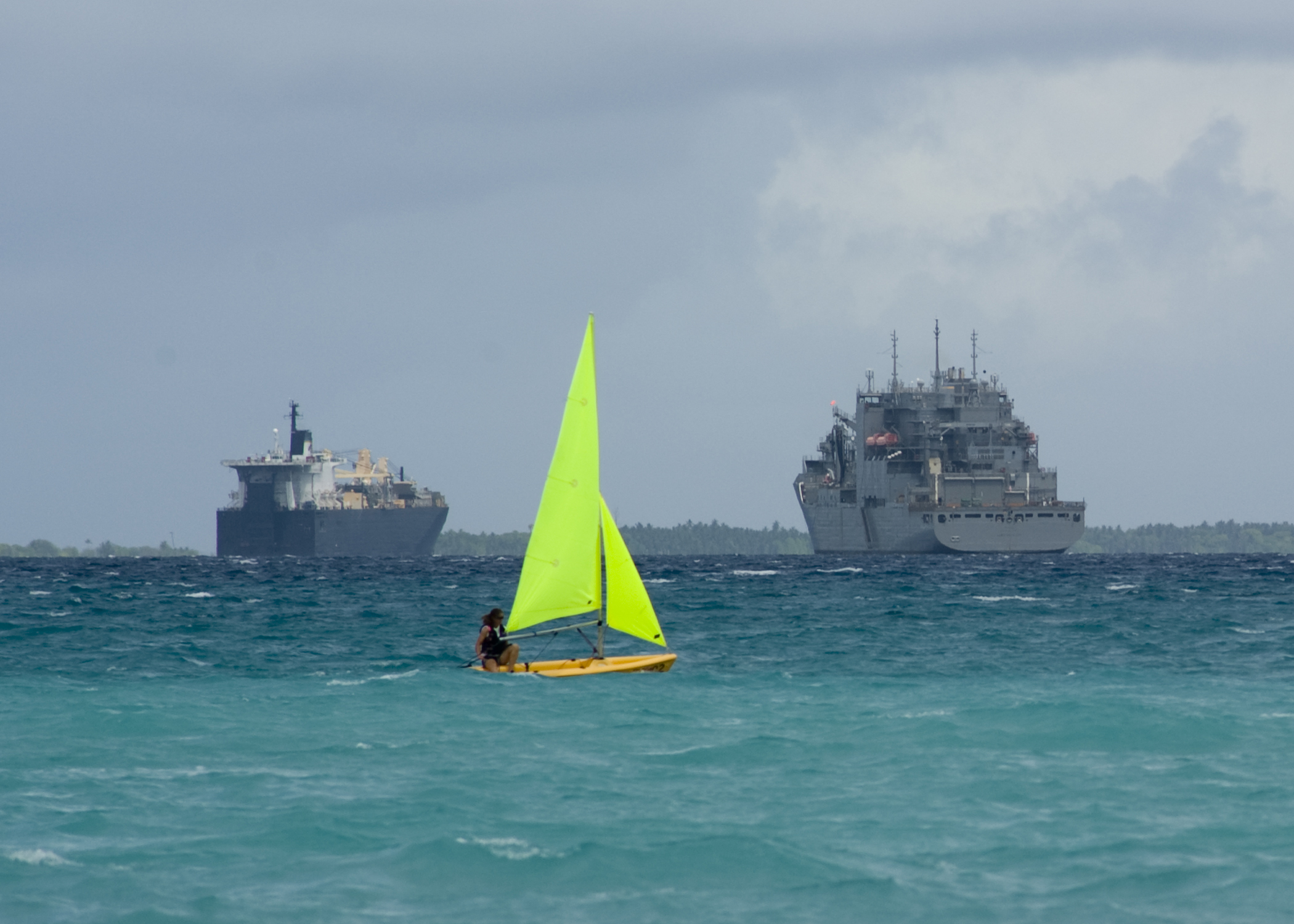
Shores of Diego Garcia.

In March 2007 Mauritian president Anerood Jugnauth declared a willingness to take the dispute to the ICJ, and for Mauritius to leave the Commonwealth. In November 2007 a line of communication was established between the Foreign & Commonwealth Office and the Mauritian High Commission for BIOT-related matters.

The British government established the BIOT Marine Protected Area in April 2010, to mixed reactions from Chagossians. While the British Foreign and Commonwealth Office claimed that it was an environmental move as well as a necessary move to improve the coral populations off east Africa, and therefore sub-Saharan marine supplies, some Chagossians claimed that the reserve would prevent any resettlement due to the inability to fish in protected areas. The Chagossian UK-based Diego Garcian Society stated that it welcomed the marine reserve, noting that it was in the interest of Chagossians to have the area protected while they were exiled and that it could be renegotiated upon resettlement. The Foreign Office claimed the reserve was made "without prejudice to the outcome of proceedings before the European Court of Human Rights". (That court's 2012 decision was not in favour of the Islanders anyway.) The protected area covered the territory's EEZ, but not its territorial waters.

=== International opinion and rulings ===
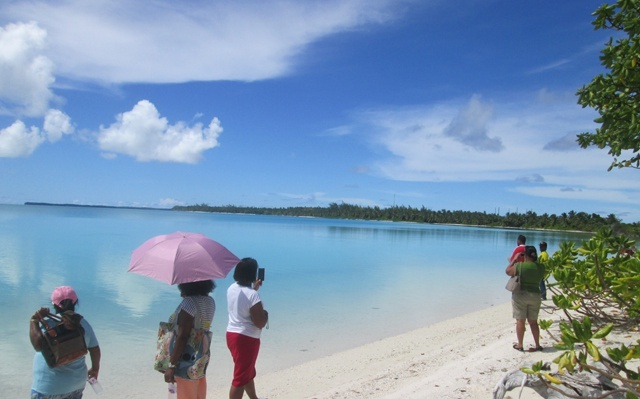
Some exiled Chagossians from Seychelles visited their motherland in 2015 sponsored by the British government.

In 2009 Mauritius began negotiating with the Maldives to jointly settle the borders of EEZs in the area. These were unsuccessful, and in 2010 the Maldives submitted a claim that overlapped with both British and Mauritian claims. The Maldives contended that as much of the northern Chagos archipelago was uninhabited, they should not be included in the determination of EEZ baselines. Arbitration between the UK and Mauritius relating to the creation of the marine protected area began in 2010. This arbitration was cited by Mauritius to halt an attempt by a coalition of NGOs to have the archipelago declared a World Heritage site in 2012. In 2015 an UNCLOS tribunal ruled that the creation of a marine protected area violated British obligations. The idea to create a formal protected area was dropped.

The US-UK arrangement which established the territory for defence purposes initially was in place from 1966 to 2016, and has subsequently been renewed to continue until 2036. The announcement was accompanied by a pledge of £40 million in compensation to former residents. The base was seen as important for managing growing Chinese influence in the region.

The formerly obscure sovereignty dispute gained more international recognition as Mauritius obtained the support of other African countries. Brexit deprived the United Kingdom of support from European allies. In May 2017, Mauritius challenged the presence of the UK at a meeting of the Indian Ocean Tuna Commission. On 22 June 2017 the United Nations General Assembly (UNGA) voted to refer the issue to the International Court of Justice (ICJ) by 94 to 15. There were 65 abstentions, including British allies such as Canada, France, and Germany. In February 2019, the ICJ issued an advisory opinion by 13 votes to 1. In its advisory opinion, the Court concluded that "the process of decolonisation of Mauritius was not lawfully completed when that country acceded to independence", and that "the United Kingdom is under an obligation to bring to an end its administration of the Chagos Archipelago as rapidly as possible". On 22 May 2019, the UNGA adopted a resolution citing the ICJ advisory opinion, affirming that "the Chagos Archipelago forms an integral part of the territory of Mauritius". The motion was approved by a majority vote with 116 member states voting for and 6 against. Votes against included the neighbouring Maldives, possibly concerned about the loss of maritime security benefits that emerge from the military base. The Seychelles benefits similarly, but voted for the resolution in solidarity with the African Union. China abstained in the 2019 UN vote, which was a step towards reaching an agreement to return the Chagos Archipelago to Mauritius.

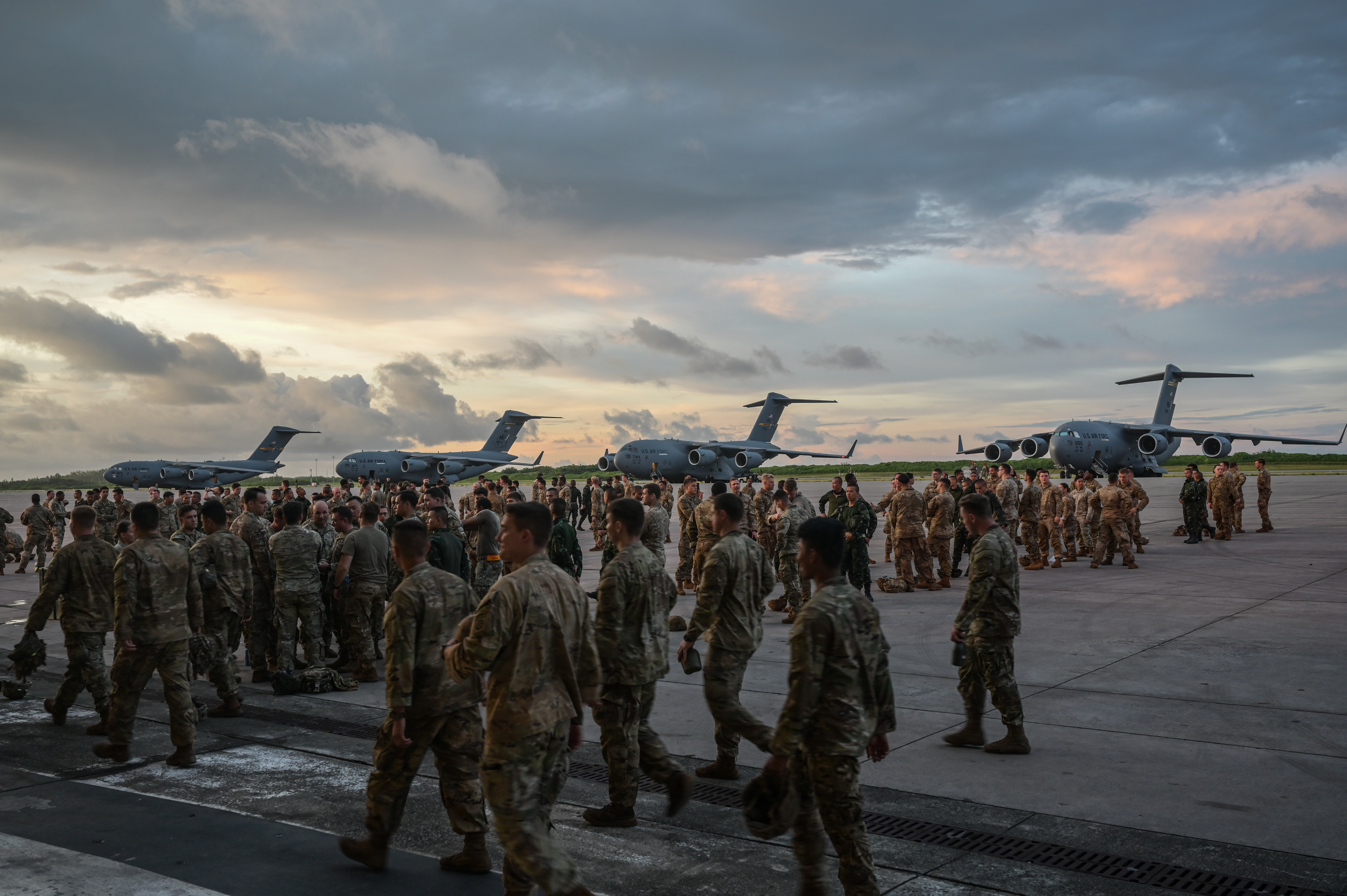
U.S. Army and Royal Thai Army soldiers prepare for movement during exercise Cobra Gold 2023 at Diego Garcia.

On 28 January 2021, the United Nations' International Tribunal for the Law of the Sea ruled, in a dispute between Mauritius and Maldives on their maritime boundary, that the United Kingdom has no sovereignty over the Chagos Archipelago, and that Mauritius is sovereign there. The United Kingdom disputes and does not recognise the tribunal's decision. As with the ICJ decision, this decision had no legal compulsion, although both contributed to international pressure on the UK. The Universal Postal Union (UPU), which has jurisdiction over international mail among treaty signatory states, voted in 2021 to ban the use of BIOT postage stamps on mail from BIOT, instead requiring Mauritian stamps to be used.

In February 2022, exiled islanders made their first unsupervised visit to an island in the Chagos Archipelago. The Permanent Representative of Mauritius to the United Nations, Jagdish Koonjul, raised the Mauritian flag on Peros Banhos. The main purpose of the 15-day Mauritian expedition is to survey the unclaimed Blenheim Reef, to discover for a forthcoming International Tribunal for the Law of the Sea hearing if it is exposed at high tide so is claimable. The chartered Bleu De Nîmes was shadowed by a British fisheries protection vessel.

In October 2021 Sri Lankan Tamil asylum seekers landed on Diego Garcia, and submitted asylum claims. The Convention Relating to the Status of Refugees does not apply to the BIOT. Around 173 arrived in 2021 and 2022. Some were moved to Rwanda, with around 60 left as of January 2024. In 2022, a dispute arising from American defence contractor KBR allegedly prohibiting holidays during a period of low flight demand during the COVID-19 pandemic led to 800 Overseas Filipino Workers being unable to leave Diego Garcia.

=== Post-ICJ negotiations and transfer ===
Comparisons between the BIOT and occupied areas of Ukraine hindered British diplomatic efforts to obtain Ukrainian support following the Russian invasion of Ukraine. Further pressure grew regarding Africa's "last colony", and in September 2022 British prime minister Liz Truss met with Mauritian prime minister Pravind Jugnauth On 3 November 2022, the British Foreign Secretary James Cleverly announced that the UK and Mauritius had decided to begin negotiations on sovereignty over the British Indian Ocean Territory, taking into account international legal proceedings. Both states had agreed to ensure the continued operation of the joint UK/US military base on Diego Garcia. The Carnegie Endowment for International Peace has argued this change of approach is partly due to strategic shifts in US and UK foreign policies on Asia in response to China's growing power and influence, as disputes with former colonies encourage their deepening relationship with China.

On 3 November 2022, Patrick Wintour of The Guardian reported that the UK and Mauritius had begun negotiations on sovereignty over the British Indian Ocean Territory, taking into account the international legal proceedings. In December 2023, Tony Diver of The Daily Telegraph reported that the British government was planning to discontinue the talks. These negotiations ceased in late 2023 after the UK Defence Secretary blocked the agreement that had been negotiated by the Foreign Office.

On 3 October 2024, British prime minister Keir Starmer and Mauritian prime minister Pravind Jugnauth jointly announced that an agreement had been reached under which the UK would cede sovereignty over the territory. Under the deal, Diego Garcia will be excluded from any resettlement, and the UK will continue to administer the island for at least 99 years. Chagos Islanders would be allowed to return to the other islands and a fund will be established to support resettlement.

No debate on the deal had taken place in the Parliament of the United Kingdom due to it being in recess, and the deal attracted criticism from opposition politicians such as James Cleverly, who, as foreign secretary, had initiated the negotiations that took place from November 2022 until December 2023. The announcement was also criticised by the Speaker of the House of Commons, Sir Lindsay Hoyle, who criticised the government for ignoring the constitutional convention that important matters should be announced in the House of Commons first. Some Chagossians have also criticised the deal for not having included the Chagossian community in the decision-making process.

In November 2024 the Maldives reiterated a previous claim to the Chagos Islands, challenging ongoing negotiations between the UK and Mauritius.

On 17 December 2024, newly elected Mauritius prime minister Navin Ramgoolam, rejected the proposed agreement and asked for talks to reopen. Following resumed negotiations, a treaty was signed on 22 May 2025 that will transfer sovereignty to Mauritius once it comes into force (expected in late 2025), with Diego Garcia military base remaining under British control during a 99-year lease (the period can be extended by a further 40 years).

Following the Chagos Archipelago handover agreement, the British government introduced legislation to implement the agreement, including amending the British Nationality Act 1981 to reflect that the British Indian Ocean Territory will no longer be an overseas territory following Parliament's ratification of the treaty, and to empower the British government to make secondary legislation to allow for the continued operation of the Diego Garcia military base. However, in April 2026 the implementation of the agreement was put on an indefinite hold due to opposition from US President Donald Trump. The Government indicated that ratification of the agreement would not be sought in the current session of Parliament, with the former Permanent Under-Secretary of State for Foreign Affairs, Simon McDonald, commenting that "this agreement, this treaty will go into the deep freeze for the time being".

=== 2026 resettlement attempt ===
On 16 February 2026, four British Chagossians landed on Île du Coin in an attempt to establish a permanent settlement, without seeking government permission. Since the expulsion of the Chagossians in 1971, no Chagossians have been allowed to live on the Chagos Islands. An injunction by the Chief Justice of the British Indian Ocean Territory three days later prevented the immediate deportation of the islanders.

== Responses to transfer of BIOT ==
=== Chagossians ===
The Chagos Refugee Group (CRG) - which counts 6000 members especially among the elders - welcomed the agreement. Olivier Bancoult, CRG's president, stressed that the Mauritian Government consulted the group : « I can assure you that the [Mauritian] prime minister did everything every time he had a negotiation, he had a consultation with our Chagossians to let them know how the thing was moving. Every time. ».

In July 2025, a legal action demanding that the British government consult with the Chagossians before transferring sovereignty of their territory progressed before the High Court. The judicial review, initiated by Chagossian claimant Misley Mandarin with the support of the Great British PAC, was accepted and fast-tracked by the High Court, the outcome of the ruling was expected Oct 25 however as of Feb 26 the judge has not made his findings public.

Some British Chagossian activists submitted a legal submission to the United Nations Human Rights Committee in June 2025, challenging the legitimacy of the UK-Mauritius deal, arguing that it was negotiated without their consent and perpetuates historical injustices.

In December 2025, Chagossians opposed to the transfer of sovereignty to Mauritius formed a government in exile. The online consultation was organized by Friends of the British Overseas Territories and the Great British PAC . 1,341 people voted online out of the 10 000 Chagossians worldwide. 1,233 respondents supported the formation of a government-in-exile. The only candidate on the ballot was Misley Mandarin.

Following the Chagossians resettlement and takeover of its current administrative centre Île du Coin, it removed the "in-exile" from its name on 17 February 2026, making it a rival government.

=== United Kingdom ===
The peers of the House of Lords concluded that the Chagos Islands deal is "not perfect" but must be ratified, the government "cannot ignore" the risk of an "adverse decision" jeopardising the United Kingdom's right to operate a joint American and British base.

In June 2025, the Great British PAC launched a legal action aimed at demonstrating the illegal actions of the British government in signing this restitution agreement. The British Conservative Party subsequently tabled a motion of censure against the agreement signed on 22 May 2025 between the United Kingdom and Mauritius.

In February 2026, UK Secretary of State for Defence, John Healey, was accused by the Conservatives of misleading parliament, by claiming in May 2025, that if the UK did not cede the British Indian Ocean Territory to Mauritius, it could face losing legal rulings "within weeks", and "within just a few years" the base as Diego Garcia "would become inoperable". Healey claimed that "the most proximate, and the most potentially serious" threat was the International Tribunal for the Law of the Sea (ITLOS), however under article 298 of the United Nations Convention on the Law of the Sea (UNCLOS) there is an exemption for "disputes concerning military activities, including military activities by government".

=== Mauritius ===
Prime Minister of Mauritius, Navin Ramgoolam hailed the agreement and called it a "victory for international law, for postcolonial justice, and above all, for the Chagossian people". However the deal still needs to be ratified in UK Parliament.

=== United States ===
In an official statement on 22 May 2025, US Secretary of State Marco Rubio welcomed the agreement between the United Kingdom and Mauritius on the future of the British Indian Ocean Territory, since the agreement secures the long-term operation of the joint US-UK military facility at Diego Garcia.

However, on 20 January 2026, US President Donald Trump characterized the UK-Mauritius agreement as an "act of great stupidity" and a sign of "total weakness". In a statement on Truth Social, he argued that transferring sovereignty of the Chagos Islands would be viewed as a lack of strength by global adversaries and cited the move as further justification for his proposal that the United States acquire Greenland. On 18 February 2026, Trump posted on Truth Social that Starmer was "making a big mistake by entering a 100 Year Lease", that the "land should not be taken away from the U.K. and, if it is allowed to be, it will be a blight on our Great Ally" and "DO NOT GIVE AWAY DIEGO GARCIA!".

=== International ===
The United Nations called the agreement a significant step towards resolving a long-standing dispute in the Indian Ocean region, which demonstrates the value of diplomacy in addressing historical grievances. However, some UN experts called for the suspension of the agreement, warning that it failed to protect the rights of the displaced Chagossian people, and for the two countries to renegotiate the restitution agreement as it forbids resettlement on Diego Garcia, the biggest island.

India welcomed the agreement, describing it as an important step in completing the decolonisation of the island nation "in the spirit of international law and a rules-based order".

== Government ==
King Charles III is the head of state of the British Indian Ocean Territory.

As a territory of the United Kingdom, the head of state is King Charles III. There is no Governor appointed to represent the King in the territory, as there are no permanent inhabitants (as is also the case in South Georgia and the South Sandwich Islands and the British Antarctic Territory). The territory is one of eight dependencies in the Indian Ocean, alongside the Ashmore and Cartier Islands, Christmas Island, the Cocos (Keeling) Islands, and Heard Island and McDonald Islands, all Australian possessions; the French Southern and Antarctic Lands, with the French Scattered Islands in the Indian Ocean and its dependencies of Tromelin and the Glorioso Islands; along with French Mayotte and Réunion.

The head of government is the Commissioner, Nishi Dholakia, and the Administrator is Mike Vidler. The Commissioner's Representative in the territory is the officer commanding the detachment of British forces.

The laws of the territory are based on the constitution, currently set out in the British Indian Ocean Territory (Constitution) Order 2004, which gives the Commissioner power to make laws for the peace, order and good government of the territory. If the Commissioner has not made a law on a particular topic then, in most circumstances, the laws that apply in the territory are the same as those that apply in England and Wales under the terms of the Courts Ordinance 1983. There is no legislature (and no elections) as there are no permanent inhabitants, although a small legal system has been established for the jurisdiction. As almost all residents of the BIOT are members of the United States military, in practice, crimes are more commonly charged under United States military law.

Applicable treaties between the United Kingdom and the United States govern the use of the military base. The first exchange of notes, signed on 30 December 1966, constituted an agreement concerning the availability for defence purposes of the British Indian Ocean Territory. This was followed by agreements on the construction of a communications facility (1972), naval support facility (1976), construction contracts (1987), and a monitoring facility (1999). The United States is reportedly required to ask permission of the United Kingdom to use the base for offensive military action.

As the BIOT forms a separate legal jurisdiction to the United Kingdom under British law, many international conventions signed by the United Kingdom were not extended to the BIOT. These include humanitarian treaties, including the 1951 Refugee Convention and the International Covenant on Civil and Political Rights, which makes the legal situation difficult. While the UK has joint jurisdiction over the military base, the British government contends that US warships around the base are responsible solely to the US, and thus do not need to meet British treaty obligations.

=== Chagossian Government ===
The Chagossian Government is a rival government claiming to represent the Chagossian people of the British Indian Ocean Territory, based on Île du Coin in the north of the territory. It was formed in December 2025 as the Chagossian Government-in-Exile, and dropped the "in exile" from its name on 17 February 2026 following its leader Misley Mandarin's return to the islands.

== Naval Party 1002 and MV Grampian Frontier ==
Naval Party 1002 (NP 1002) is directly present in the territory, and is composed of both Royal Navy and Royal Marine personnel. NP 1002 is responsible for civil administration and enforcement. Its members are tasked with policing and carrying out customs duties. Royal Marines in the territory also reportedly form a security detachment.

Prior to 2017, the BIOT patrol vessel, MV Pacific Marlin, was based in Diego Garcia. It was operated by the Swire Pacific Offshore Group. The Pacific Marlin patrolled the marine reserve all year, and since the marine reserve was designated in April 2010, the number of apprehensions of illegal vessels within the area has increased. The ship was built in 1978 as an ocean-going tug. It is 57.7 metres (189 feet 4 inches) long, with a draught of 3.8 metres (12 feet 6 inches), and gross tonnage of 1,200 tons. It has a maximum speed of 12.5 knots (23.2 kilometres per hour; 14.4 miles per hour) with an economic speed of 11 knots (20 kilometres per hour; 13 miles per hour), permitting a range of about 18,000 nautical miles (33,000 kilometres; 21,000 miles) and fuel endurance of 68 days. It was the oldest vessel in the Swire fleet. Pacific Marlin reportedly spent about 54% of her taskings on fishery patrol duties, and a further 19% on military patrol duties.

In 2016, a new contract was signed with Scottish-based North Star Shipping for the use of the vessel MV Grampian Frontier (also known as the Grampian Endurance). She is a 70 metres (230 feet) vessel carrying up to 24 personnel, and fulfils both the patrol and research role. The vessel reportedly operates in conjunction with personnel from NP 1002 on both fisheries and military enforcement tasks / exercises, and also carries scientists / researchers involved in a range of research work, particularly conservation. In 2022, Grampian Frontier tracked a Mauritian-charted vessel temporarily bringing Chagossian exiles to Blenheim Reef in the archipelago.

The Royal Navy also maintains two offshore patrol vessels in the Indo-Pacific region, HMS Tamar and HMS Spey. Either may be periodically employed for sovereignty protection and other duties in BIOT waters. HMS Tamar paid a rare visit to the islands in February/March 2023 conducting fisheries protection and other missions.

== Geography ==
Map of the British Indian Ocean Territory.

The territory is an archipelago of 58 islands covering 56 square kilometres (22 sq mi). The largest island is Diego Garcia, which at 32.5 square kilometres (12.5 sq mi) accounts for about half of the territory's total land area. The rest of the islands are much smaller, with the second largest being just over 3.1 square kilometres (1.2 sq mi). The terrain is flat and low, with an average elevation of 1.33 metres (4.4 ft) above sea level. In 2010, 545,000 square kilometres (210,000 square miles) of ocean around the islands was declared a marine reserve.

The British Indian Ocean Territory (Constitution) Order 2004 defined the territory as comprising the following islands or groups of islands:

- Diego Garcia
- Three Brothers Islands
- Egmont Islands
- Nelson Island
- Peros Banhos
- Eagle Islands
- Salomon Islands
- Danger Island

These islands and associated coral reefs lie between 4°44 and 7°41 south and 70°47 and 72°47 east.

As indicated above, the territory also included Aldabra, Farquhar and Desroches between 1965 and 1976; the latter group of islands is located north of Madagascar and were annexed from and returned to the Seychelles.

=== Climate ===
The climate is tropical marine; hot, humid, and moderated by trade winds. These winds originate from the southeast from May to November, reversing for the rest of the year. The average temperature is 27 °C (81 °F), and does not vary greatly throughout the year. While rain is common, the territory lies outside of cyclone paths that cross the Indian Ocean further south. The Diego Garcia military base is the United States military's overseas base most at risk from climate change.

=== Transport ===
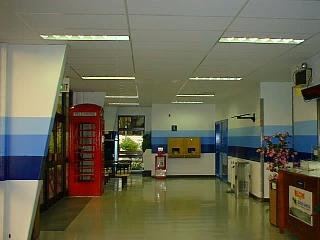
The airport passenger terminal in Diego Garcia, complete with red British telephone box.

In terms of transportation on Diego Garcia, the island has short stretches of paved road between the port and airfield, and on its streets; transport is mostly by bicycle and on foot. The island had many wagonways, which were donkey-hauled narrow-gauge railways for the transport of coconut wagons. These are no longer in use and have deteriorated.

Diego Garcia's military base is home to the territory's only airport. At 3,000 metres (9,800 feet) long, the runway is capable of supporting heavy US Air Force bombers such as the B-52, and would have been able to support the Space Shuttle in the event of a mission abort. It also has a major naval seaport, and there is also a marina bus service along the main road of the island.

Yacht crews seeking safe passage across the Indian Ocean may apply for a mooring permit for the uninhabited Outer Islands (beyond Diego Garcia), but must not approach within 3 nautical miles (5.6 kilometres; 3.5 miles), land on, or anchor at islands designated as Strict Nature Reserves, or the nature reserve within the Peros Banhos atoll. Unauthorised vessels or persons are not permitted access to Diego Garcia, and no unauthorised vessel is permitted to approach within three nautical miles of the island.

Unlike other British Overseas Territories, BIOT uses right-hand traffic since the island follows U.S. traffic laws because the U.S. Military Base takes up most of the island.

=== Conservation ===
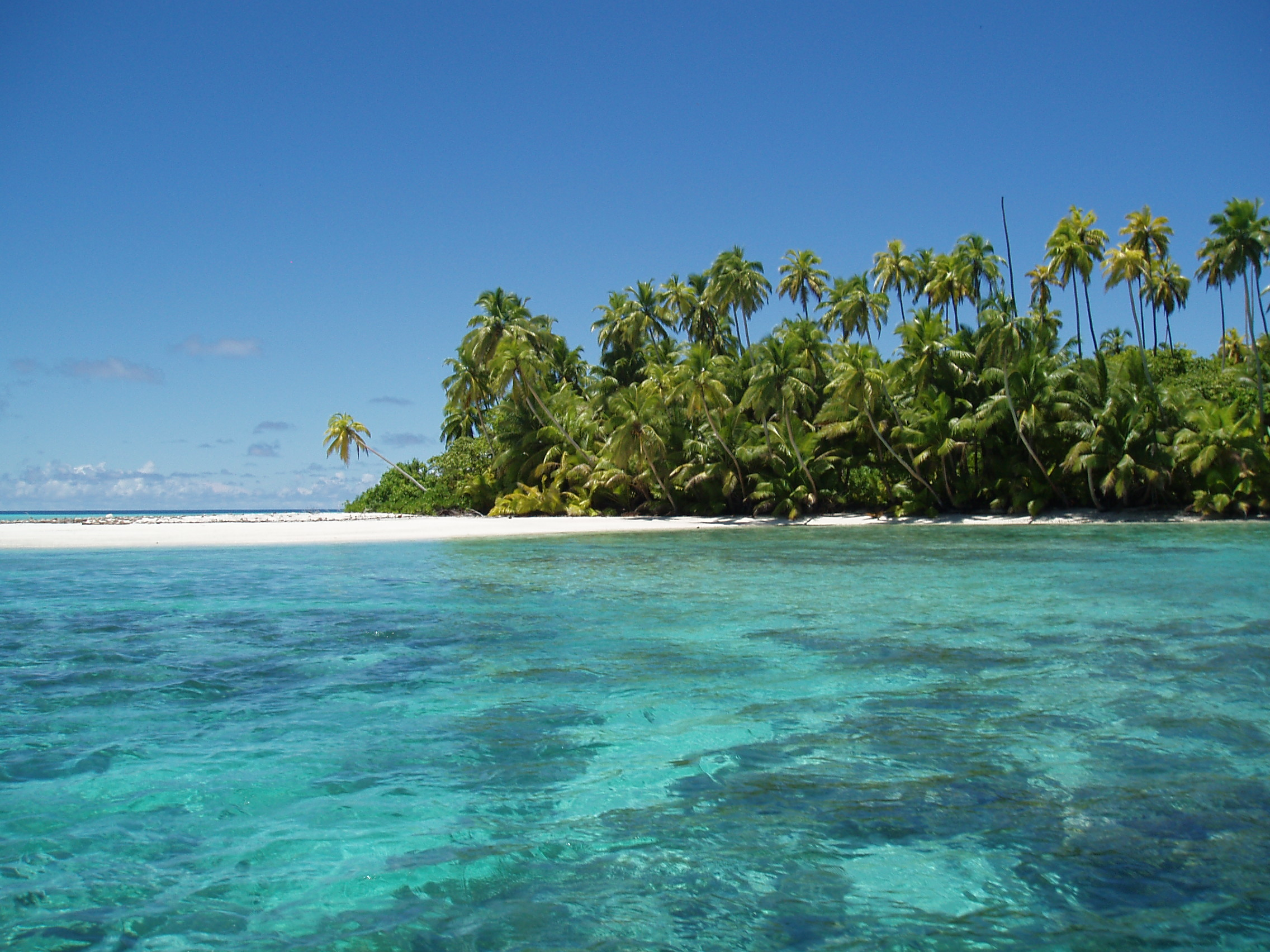
Salomons Atoll

The territory is part of the International Whaling Commission's 1979 Indian Ocean Whale Sanctuary. The Ramsar Convention was extended to the BIOT on 8 September 1998, and application for non-military areas of Diego Garcia began on 4 July 2001. BIOT is also subject to CITES, the Convention on the Conservation of Migratory Species, and the Vienna Convention for the Protection of the Ozone Layer.

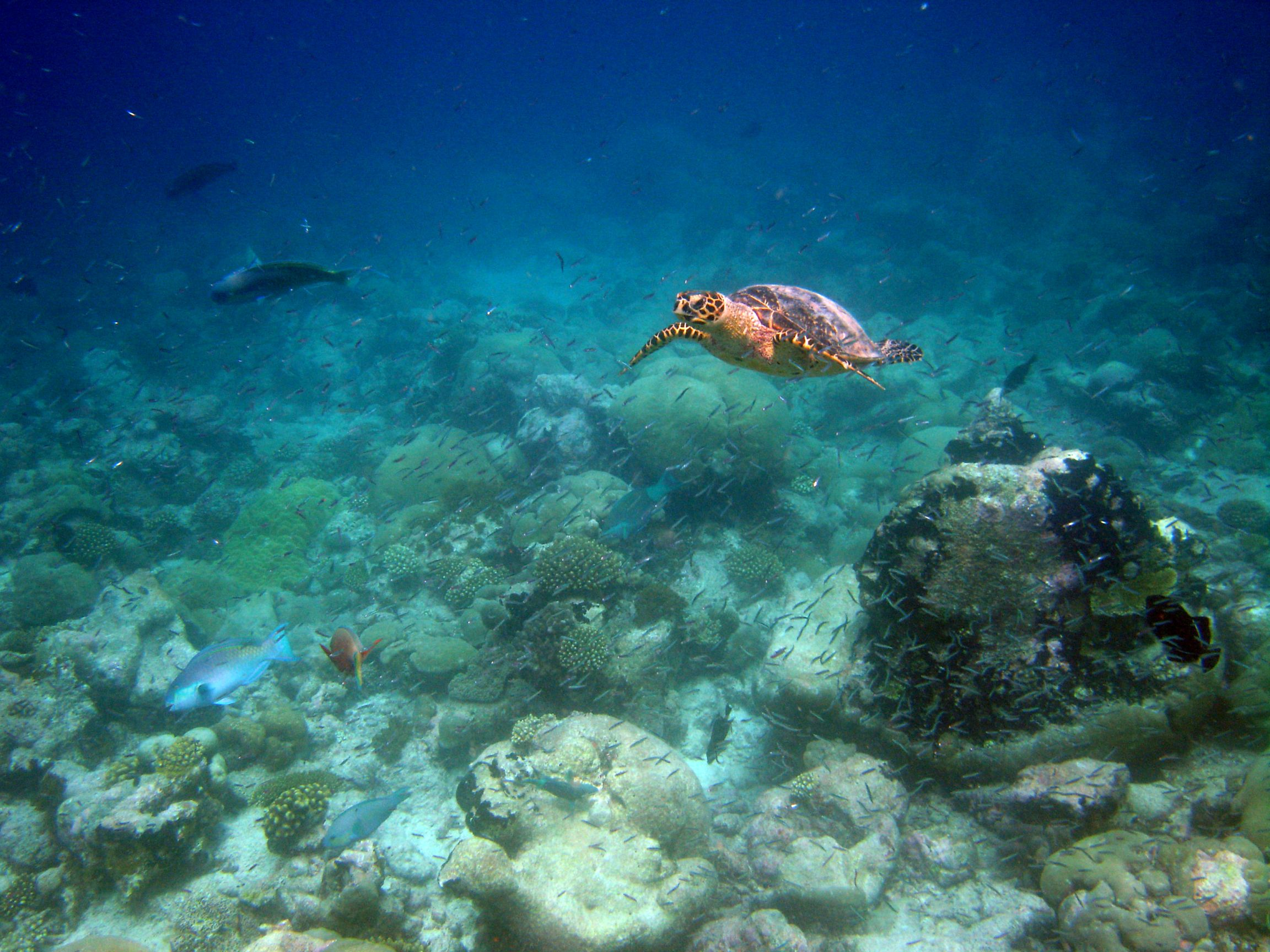
Hawksbill sea turtle in a coral reef in the Chagos Archipelago.

On 1 April 2010, the Chagos Marine Protected Area (MPA) was declared to cover the waters around the Chagos Archipelago. Mauritius objected, stating this was contrary to its legal rights, and on 18 March 2015, the Permanent Court of Arbitration ruled that the MPA was illegal under the United Nations Convention on the Law of the Sea, as Mauritius had legally binding rights to fish in the waters surrounding the archipelago, to an eventual return of the archipelago, and to the preservation of any minerals or oil discovered in or near the archipelago prior to its return.

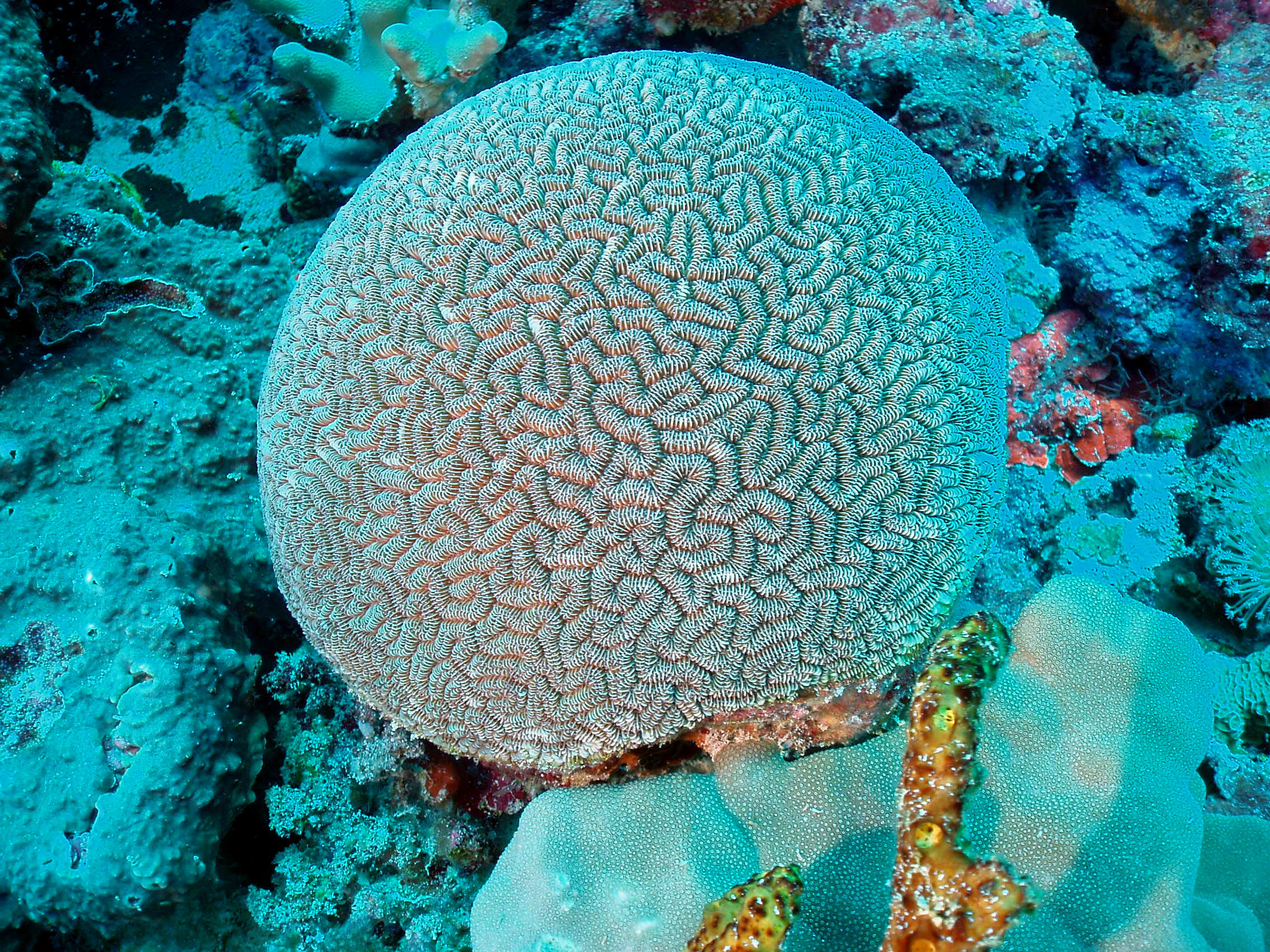
The brain coral Ctenella chagius is endemic to the reefs of the Chagos

The MPA's declaration doubled the total area of environmental no-take zones worldwide. The benefits of protecting this area are described as follows:

- Providing an environmental benchmark for other areas (unlike the rest of the world, the BIOT has been relatively untouched by man's actions);
- Providing a natural laboratory to help understand climate change;
- An opportunity for research related to marine science, biodiversity, and climate change;
- Acting as a reserve for species in danger in other areas; and
- Providing an export supply of surplus juveniles, larvae, seeds, and spores to help with output in neighbouring areas.

The area had already been declared an Environmental (Preservation and Protection) Zone, but since the establishment of the MPA, fishing has no longer been permitted in the area.

The BIOT Administration has facilitated several visits to the territory by the eldest Chagossians, and environmental training for UK-based Chagossians that allows some to become involved in scientific work (alongside visiting scientists).

The islands are surrounded by very productive fisheries. As the BIOT EEZ is patrolled by only one dedicated vessel, the Grampian Frontier, it is difficult to monitor illegal fishing. A rise in illegal fishing in the early 2020s led to a decrease in sharks, and the Royal Navy ship HMS Tamar was sent to assist with monitoring efforts.

== Demographics ==
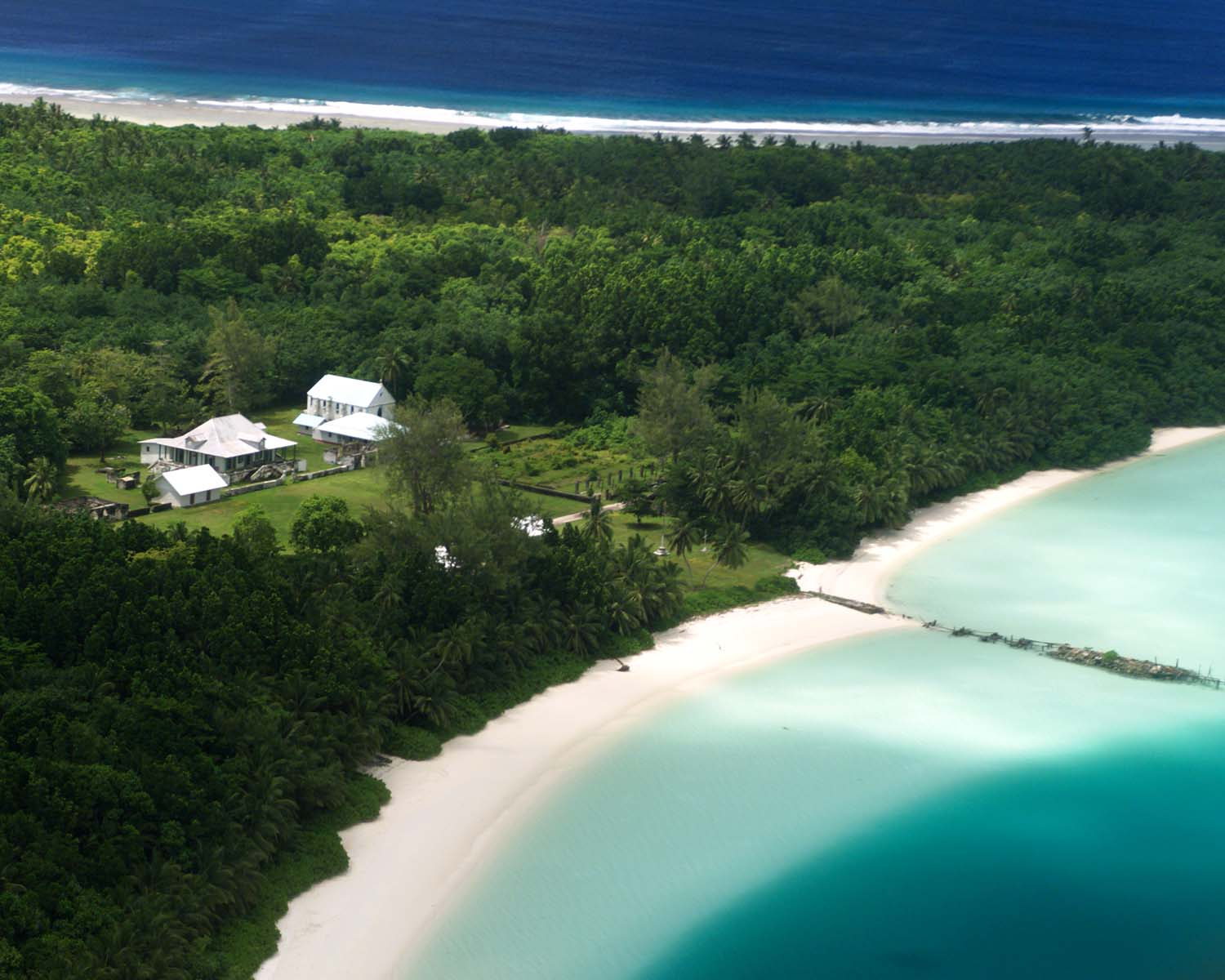
East Point in Diego Garcia, was the largest civilian settlement in the archipelago, and served as the administrative capital until the depopulation of the territory.

The British Indian Ocean Territory (Constitution) Order 2004 states that "no person has the right of abode" in the territory as it "was constituted and is set aside to be available for the defence purposes of the Government of the United Kingdom and the Government of the United States of America", and accordingly, "no person is entitled to enter or be present in the Territory except as authorised" by its laws.

As there is no permanent population, or census, information on the demographics of the territory is limited; the size of the population is related to its offensive requirements. Diego Garcia, with a land area of 27 square kilometres (10 square miles), is the only inhabited island in the territory, and therefore has an estimated average population density of around 110 persons per km^{2}. Diego Garcia's population is normally limited to official visitors and military-essential personnel only, and family members are not authorised to travel to Diego Garcia (the island therefore has no schools). Personnel may not travel to the island for leave, but they may transit through Diego Garcia to connect with follow-on flights. The population in 1995 was estimated to be approximately 3,300; i.e. 1,700 UK and US military personnel and 1,500 civilian contractors. The total population was reportedly 4,000 persons in 2006, of whom 2,200 were US military personnel or contractors, 1,400 were Overseas Filipino Worker contract staff, 300 were Mauritian contract staff, and 100 were members of the British Armed Forces. The population had decreased to around 3,000 persons in 2018. United Nations population statistics indicate that the island's population is comparable to that of the Falkland Islands. The remainder of the archipelago is ordinarily uninhabited.

=== Marooned asylum seekers ===
In October 2021, 89 Sri Lankan Tamils, including 20 children, who were travelling from India to Canada in a vessel which ran into distress, were intercepted and escorted to Diego Garcia by the British military. After more than seven months without a resolution to their situation on the island, 42 of them started a hunger strike. London solicitors for 81 of them say they have been given no information about how they may claim international protection, or how long they will be kept on Diego Garcia.

On 10 April 2022, a further 30 asylum seekers rescued from a second vessel joined the 89 Sri Lankans, who are being kept in a tented fenced-in camp. On 25 October 2022, the British government stated it "remains committed to supporting their departure" and they "will not be permitted to make a claim for asylum in the UK".

Further small boats with Tamil refugees that ran into difficulties were escorted to Diego Garcia, where repairs were made, and they were permitted to leave. One boat carrying 46 people went on to the French territory of Réunion.

The BIOT commissioner ruled that the group that had arrived in October 2021 could be lawfully returned to Sri Lanka. Ten group members challenged this decision in the BIOT Supreme Court, on the basis that the decision-making process was flawed, and were granted a judicial review that was due to be heard in September 2023. Shortly before the judicial review hearing, lawyers representing the commissioner withdrew all the decisions, and the commissioner agreed to reassess each protection claim using reviewers not previously involved in the cases. The solicitor for eight of the group said: "Our clients are relieved that the BIOT commissioner has finally agreed to withdraw the unlawful decisions to forcibly return them to Sri Lanka where they face risk of torture and persecution."

The asylum seekers live in tents in a fenced camp of approximately 100 m × 140 m (14,000 m^{2} or 1.4 ha), which they cannot leave without a security escort. "Most of the children have never left the camp other than infrequent visits to the beach under security escort" a report by a UN agency says. There have been reports of sexual assault (by other asylum seekers), self-harm and suicide attempts. As of February 2024, there were 61 people in the camp.

In December 2024, Judge Margaret Obi of the BIOT Supreme Court ruled that twelve of the asylum seekers had been unlawfully detained.

=== 2026 resettlement mission ===
On 16 February 2026, four British Chagossians on behalf of the self-declared Chagossian Government defied a British government exclusion zone to set foot on Île du Coin with the intention of staying to establish a permanent settlement. Many Chagossians wish to return to the islands after their expulsion in 1971.

On 18 February 2026, they were served a removal order in the name of Royal Marines Major Pete Goddard, as Acting Principal Immigration Officer of the British Indian Ocean Territory, stating that if they did not leave they could face imprisonment of three years or a fine of £3,000, or both. On 19 February 2026, the Chagossians' lawyer, James Tumbridge, successfully applied for a weeklong injunction, which was granted by James Lewis, the Chief Justice of the British Indian Ocean Territory.

== Economy ==
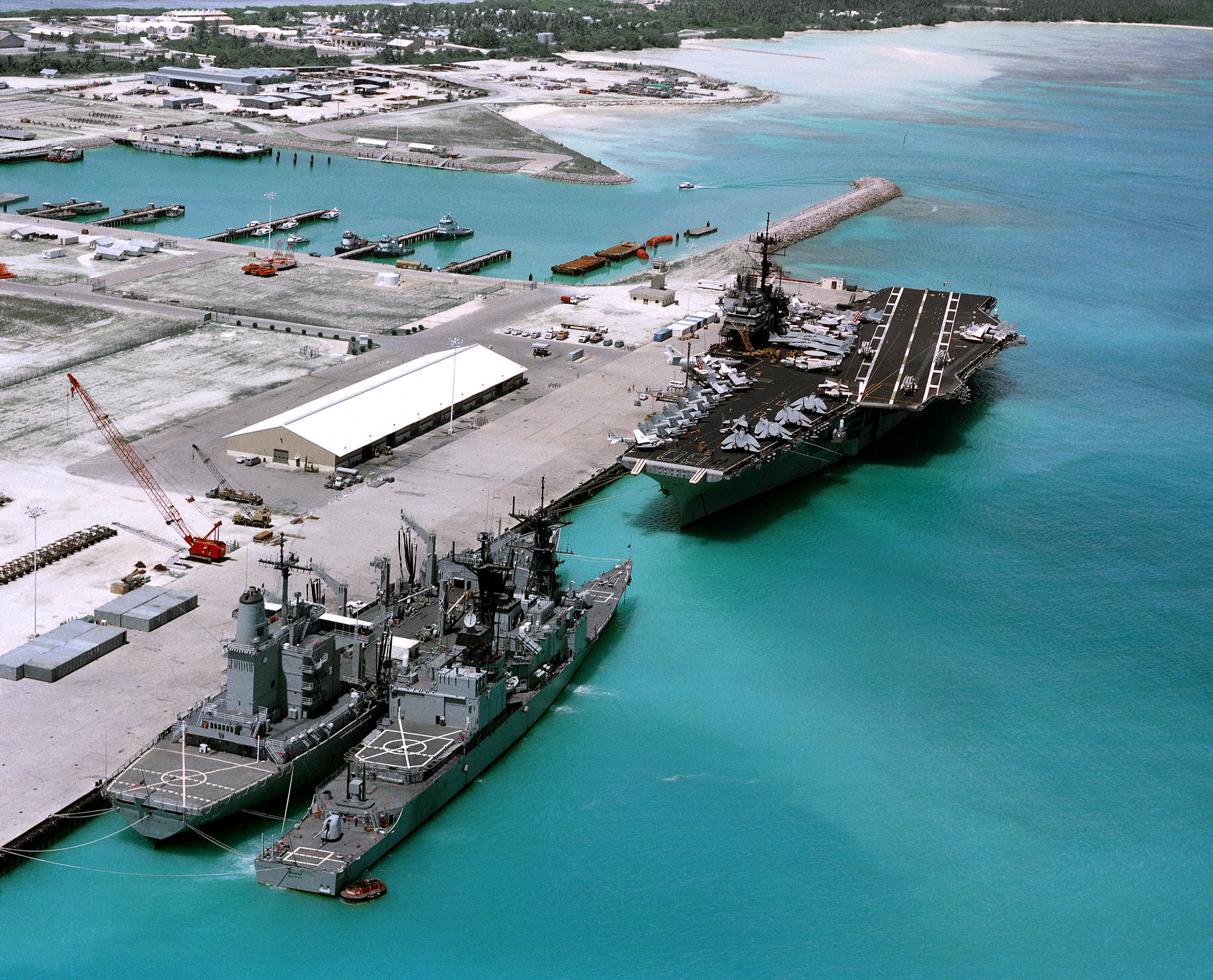
U.S. Navy ships in Diego Garcia.

All economic activity is concentrated on Diego Garcia, where joint UK/US defence facilities are located. Construction projects and the operation of various services needed to support the military installations are carried out by military and contract employees from Britain, Mauritius, the Philippines, and the United States. There are no industrial or agricultural activities on the islands. Until the creation of the marine sanctuary, the licensing of commercial fishing provided an annual income of about US$1 million for the territory.

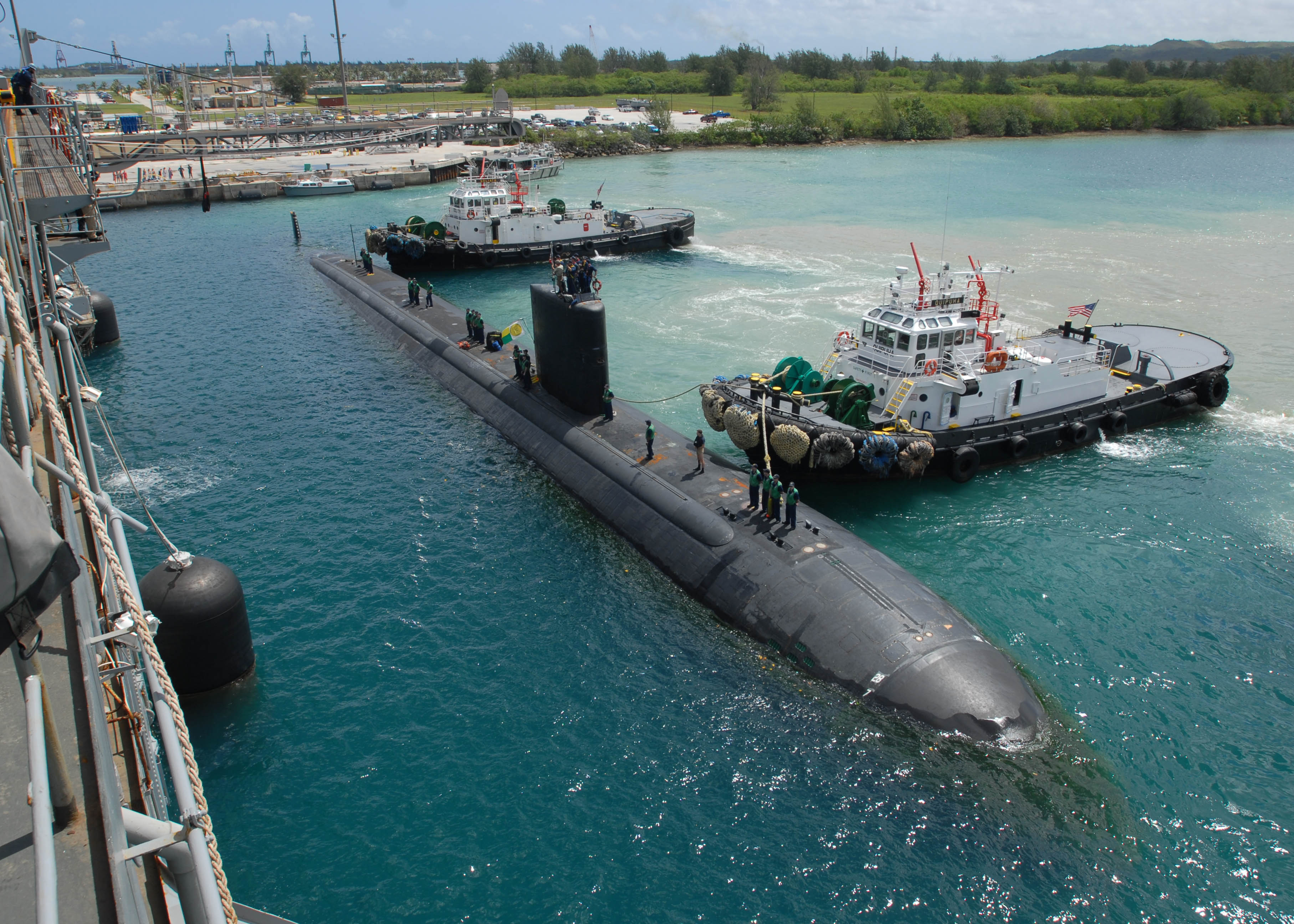
U.S. Navy submarine at the homeport in Diego Garcia.

United States President Donald Trump announced a 10% tariff on the British Indian Ocean Territory on 2 April 2025.

=== Services ===
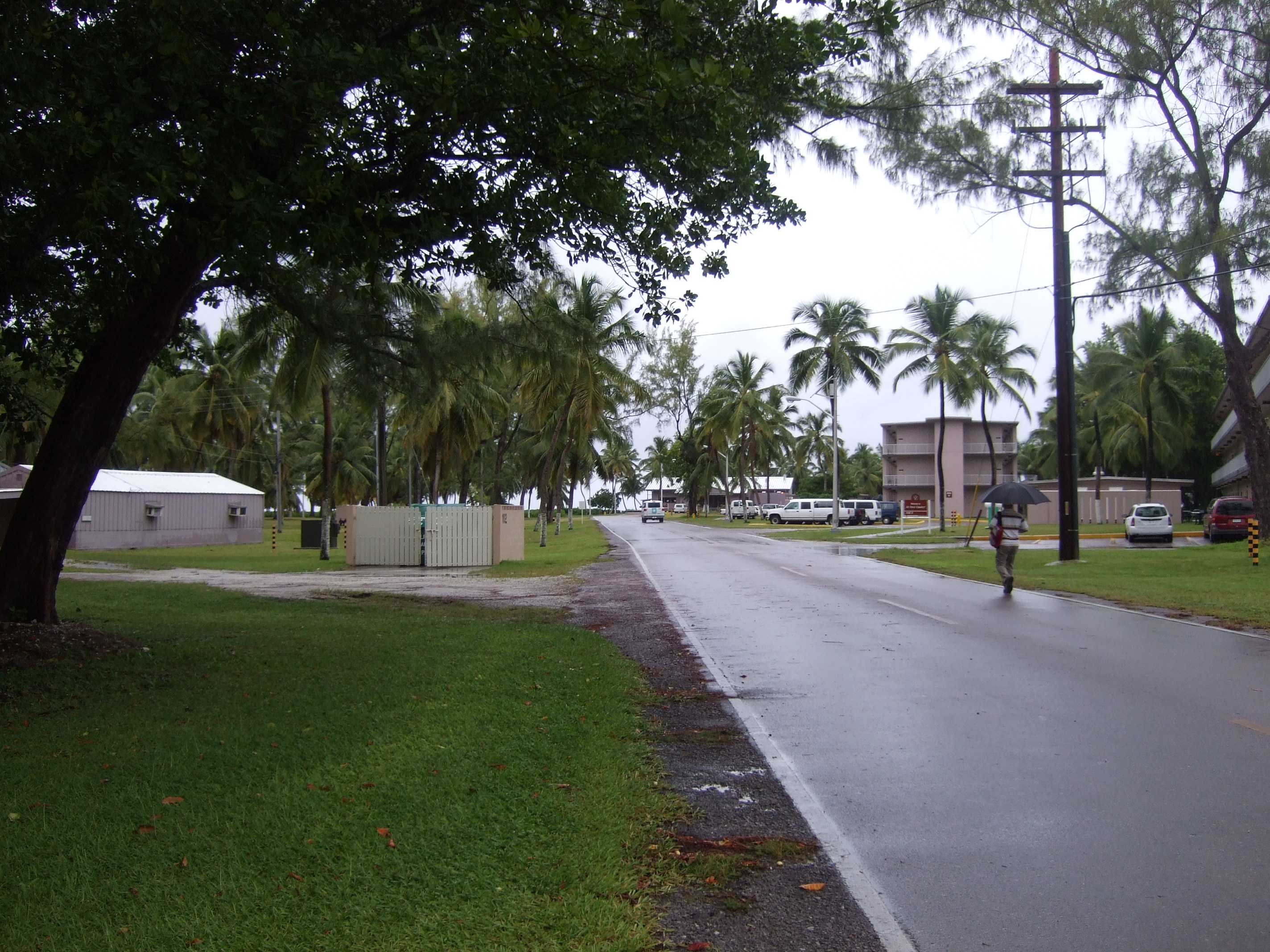
Street in Diego Garcia. Traffic drives on the right, unlike other British territories, except for Gibraltar.

The Navy Morale, Welfare and Recreation (MWR) section provides several facilities on Diego Garcia, including a library, outdoor cinema, shops, and sports centres, with prices in US dollars. The BIOT Post Office provides outbound postal services, and postage stamps have been issued for the territory since 17 January 1968. As the territory was originally part of Mauritius and the Seychelles, these stamps were denominated in rupees until 1992, after which they were issued in denominations of pound sterling, the territory's official currency. Basic medical services are provided, with the option of medical evacuation where required, and the territory has no schools.

=== Telecommunications ===
Cable & Wireless started operating telecommunications services in 1982, under licence from the British government. In April 2013, the company was acquired by the Batelco Group, and Cable & Wireless (Diego Garcia) Ltd subsequently changed its name to Sure (Diego Garcia) Ltd; Sure International is the corporate division of the business.

Due to its geographic location in proximity to the Equator, with unobstructed views to the horizon, Diego Garcia has access to a relatively large number of geosynchronous satellites over the Indian and eastern Atlantic Oceans, and the island is home to Diego Garcia Station (DGS), a remote tracking station making up part of the United States Space Force's Satellite Control Network (SCN); the station has two sides to provide enhanced tracking capabilities for AFSCN users.

In spring 2022, Diego Garcia was connected to a fibre-optic submarine communications cable, as a spur to the new commercial Oman Australia Cable connecting Perth to Muscat, which ran near the island. The cable also has a spur to Australia's Cocos Islands, which has an airfield due to support maritime patrol aircraft. The cable cost $300 million, with the U.S. DOD contributing about a third of the cost.

=== Broadcasting ===
The territory has three FM radio broadcast stations, provided by the American Forces Network (AFN) and British Forces Broadcasting Service (BFBS). Amateur radio operations occur from Diego Garcia, using the British callsign prefix VQ9. An amateur club station, VQ9X, was sponsored by the US Navy for use by operators both licensed in their home country and possessing a VQ9 callsign issued by the local British Indian Ocean Territory representative. The navy closed the station in early 2013, and any future licensed amateurs wishing to operate from the island would therefore have had to provide their own antenna and radio equipment.

=== .io domain name ===
The .io (Indian Ocean) country-code top-level domain was delegated by the Internet Assigned Numbers Authority (IANA) to British entrepreneur Paul Kane in 1997, and was operated for private benefit under the trade name 'Internet Computer Bureau' from 1997 until 2017. In April 2017, Paul Kane sold the Internet Computer Bureau holding company to privately held domain name registry services provider Afilias for US$70 million in cash.

In July 2021, the Chagos Refugees Group UK submitted a complaint to the Irish government against Paul Kane and Afilias, seeking repatriation of the .io domain, and payment of back royalties from the $7m per year in revenue generated by the domain.

== Sports ==
The Chagos Islands national football team, started by the descendants of exiled Chagossians, has represented the islands in non-FIFA competitions, including the 2016 CONIFA World Football Cup.

== See also ==
- Chagos Archipelago sovereignty dispute
- Chagossian Government-in-Exile
- Legal Consequences of the Separation of the Chagos Archipelago from Mauritius in 1965
- List of sovereign states and dependent territories in the Indian Ocean
