= East Point, Diego Garcia =

East Point
- Ghost town
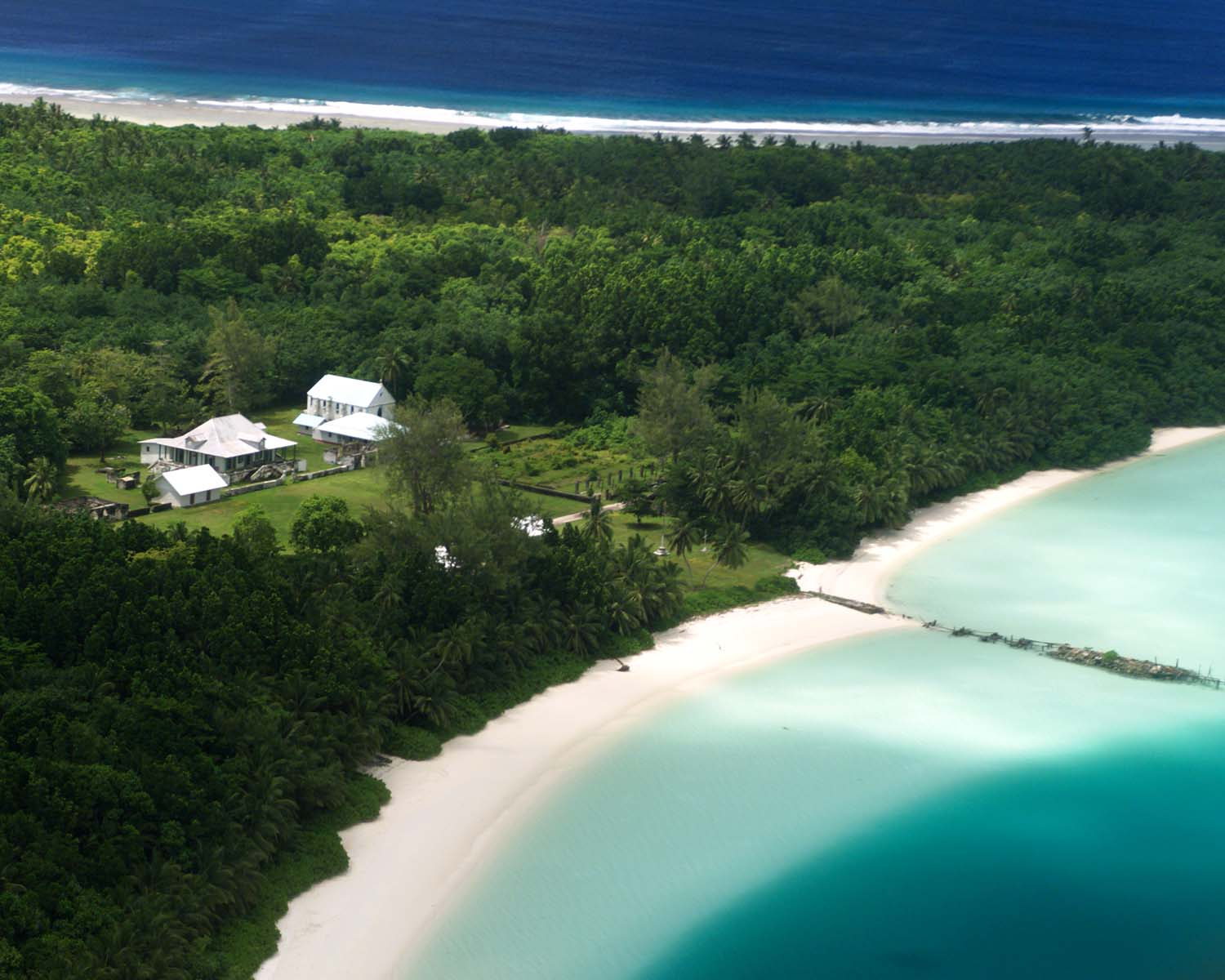
- A view of East Point from the air

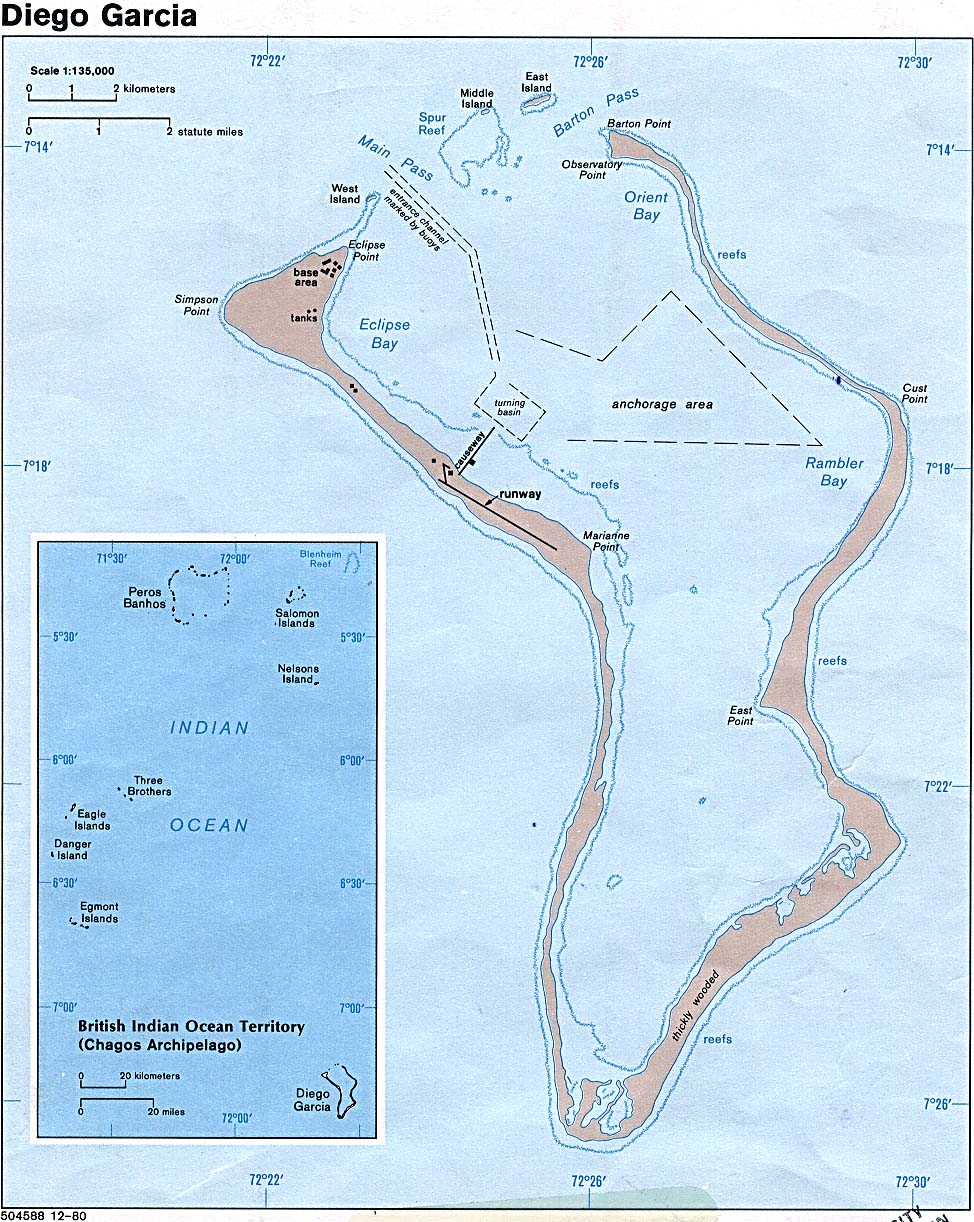
- Map of Diego Garcia. East Point is annotated.
- Coordinates: 07°21′12.2″S 072°28′3.5″E

Population (2016)
  - Total: 0
- Time zone: UTC+6 (UTC+06:00)
- Postal code: BBND 1ZZ

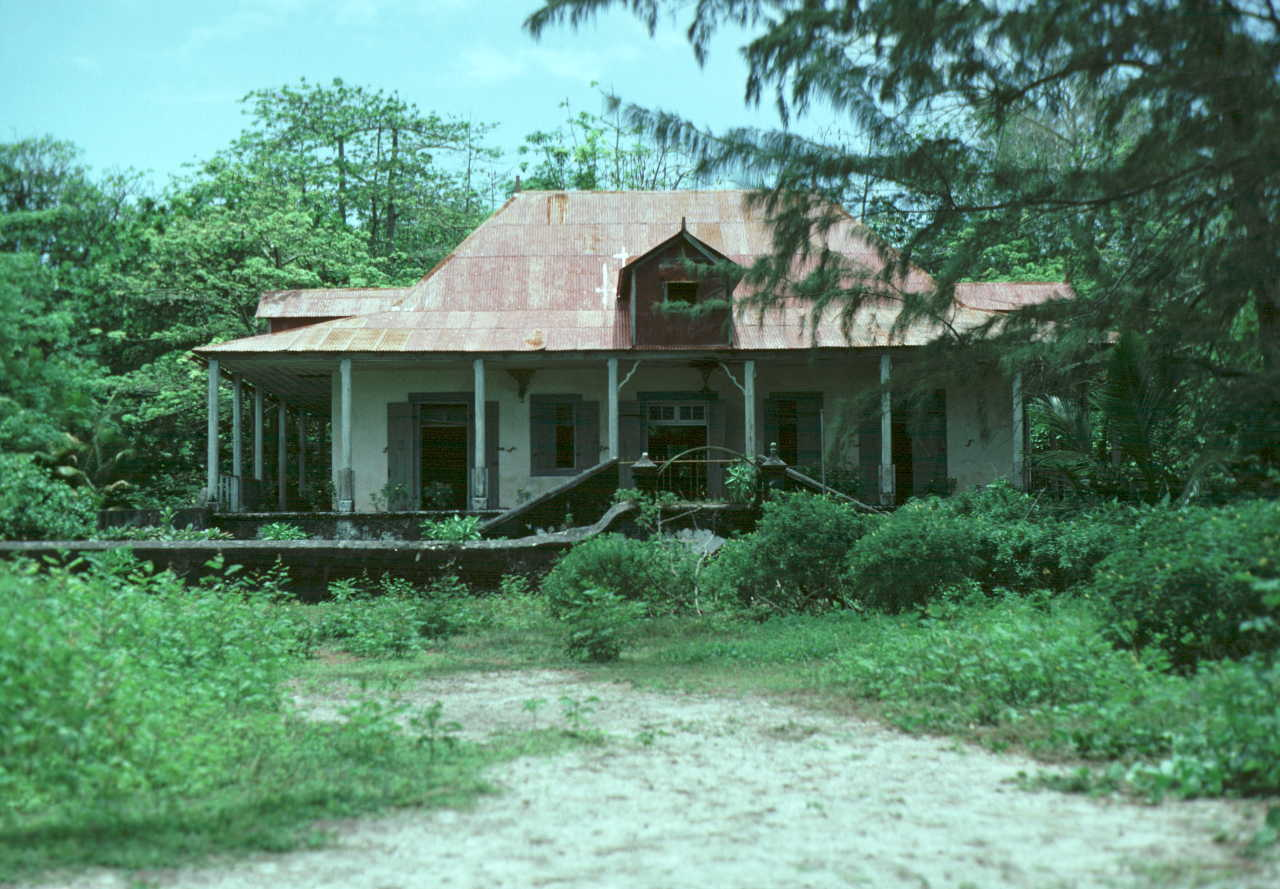
Former plantation manager's house, prior to restoration

East Point is an abandoned settlement on the east of the atoll of Diego Garcia. It was the largest civilian settlement in the archipelago, and served as the administrative capital until the forced depopulation of the territory.

The settlement contained a church, cemetery, school, sanatorium, and senior management housing. It also contained a post office, which became the plantation warden's office.

== History ==
The settlement was one of four founded during French rule. Originally named Pointe de l'Est, it originally served as a coconut plantation.

Diego Garcia was ceded to the United Kingdom after the Napoleonic Wars as part of the Treaty of Paris (1814).

=== During the Second World War ===
In 1942, the British opened RAF Station Diego Garcia and established an advanced flying boat unit at the East Point Plantation, staffed and equipped by No 205 and No 240 Squadrons, then stationed on Ceylon. Both Catalina and Sunderland aircraft were flown during the course of the Second World War in search of Japanese and German submarines and surface raiders. At Cannon Point, six naval guns were installed by a Royal Marines detachment. In February 1942, the mission was to protect the small Royal Navy base and RAF station located on the island from Japanese attack. They were later occupied by Mauritian and Indian Coastal Artillery troops. Following the conclusion of hostilities, the station was closed on 30 April 1946.

=== After abandonment ===
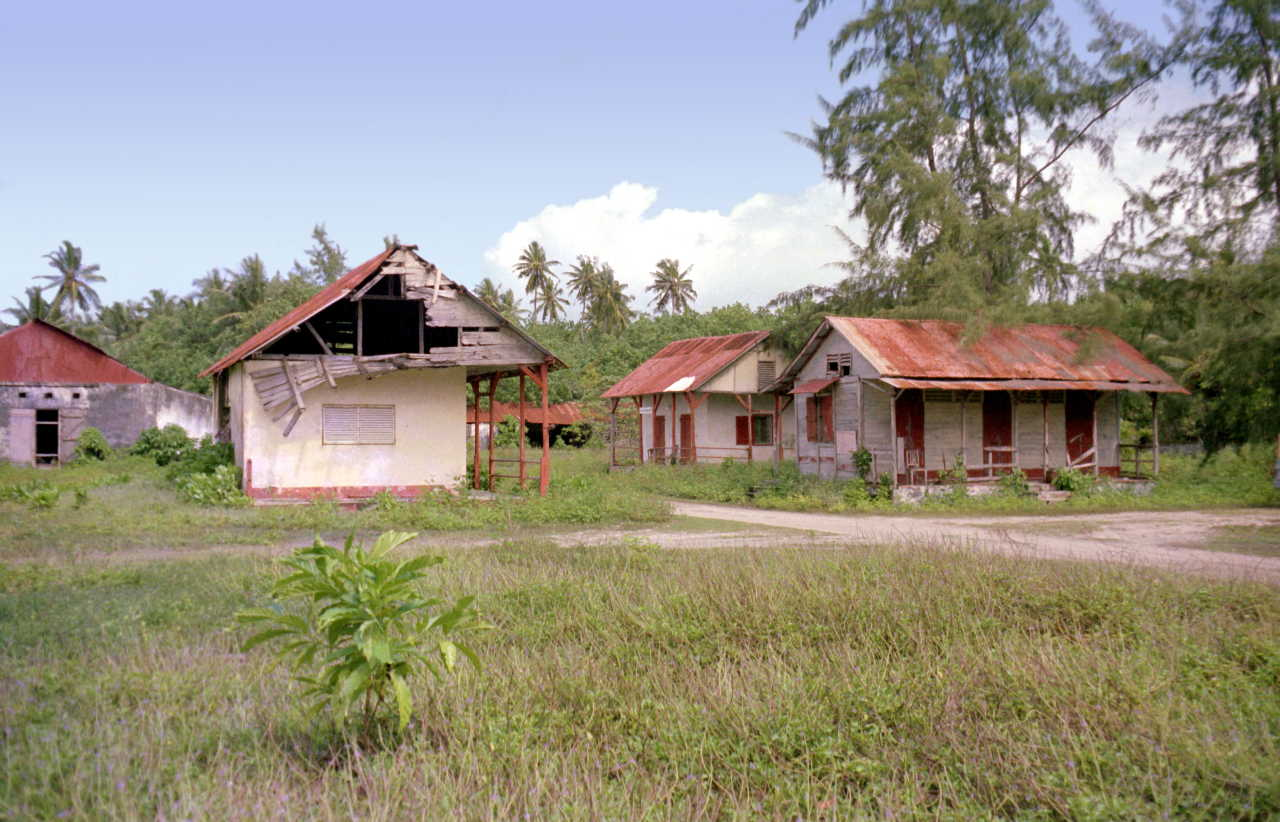
Abandoned buildings in the town

Originally, the British Representative resided in East Point, but later moved to the US Base.

Today, the settlement lies in the eastern restricted zone of the island.
