= British Forces British Indian Ocean Territories =

Military base on Diego Garcia

British Forces British Indian Ocean Territories (BFBIOT) is the name for the British Armed Forces Permanent Joint Operating Base (PJOB) on Diego Garcia, in the British Indian Ocean Territory. While the naval and airbase facilities on Diego Garcia are leased to the United States as Naval Support Facility Diego Garcia, in practice, the base operates as a joint UK-US base, with the United Kingdom retaining full and continual access.

Diego Garcia is strategically located, offering access to East Africa, the Middle East and Southeast Asia. The base serves as a staging area for the buildup or resupply of military forces prior to an operation.

== Naval Party 1002 and MV Grampian Frontier ==
Naval Party 1002 (NP 1002) is directly present in the territory and is composed of both Royal Navy and Royal Marine personnel. NP 1002 is responsible for civil administration and enforcement. Its members are tasked with policing and carrying out customs duties. Royal Marines in the territory also reportedly form a security detachment.

Prior to 2017, the BIOT Patrol Vessel the MV Pacific Marlin was based in Diego Garcia. It was operated by the Swire Pacific Offshore Group. The MV Pacific Marlin patrolled the marine reserve all year, and since the marine reserve was designated in April 2010, the number of apprehensions of illegal vessels within the area has increased. The ship was built in 1978 as an oceangoing tug. It is 57.7 metres long with a draft of 3.8 metres and gross tonnage 1,200. It has a maximum speed of 12.5 knots with an economic speed of 11 knots, permitting a range of about 18,000 nautical miles and fuel endurance of 68 days. It was the oldest vessel in the Swire fleet. Pacific Marlin reportedly spent about 54% of her taskings on Fishery Patrol duties and a further 19% on military patrol duties.

In 2016 a new contract was signed with Scottish-based North Star Shipping for the use of the vessel MV Grampian Frontier. She is a 70-metre vessel carrying up to 24 personnel and fulfills both the patrol and research role. The vessel reportedly operates in conjunction with personnel from NP 1002 on both fisheries and military enforcement tasks/exercises and also carries scientists/researchers involved in a range of research work, particularly conservation. In 2022, Grampian Frontier tracked a Mauritian-charted vessel temporarily bringing Chagossian exiles to Blenheim reef in the archipelego.

The Royal Navy also maintains two offshore patrol vessels in the Indo-Pacific region, HMS Tamar and HMS Spey. Either may be periodically employed for sovereignty protection and other duties in BIOT waters. HMS Tamar paid a rare visit to the islands in February/March 2023 conducting fisheries protection and other missions.

== See also ==
- Overseas military bases of the United Kingdom
