= List of UN resolutions concerning the Chagos Archipelago =

This is a list of United Nations resolutions concerning the Chagos Archipelago. It includes resolutions of United Nations organs that expressly concern the territorial integrity of Mauritius, the Chagos Archipelago, the British Indian Ocean Territory, Diego Garcia or the Chagossians, or that the International Court of Justice (ICJ) or other reliable sources treat as concerning the archipelago. General resolutions on decolonisation that the ICJ and the states taking part in its advisory proceedings relied on in connection with the archipelago are listed separately, as context.

The United Kingdom separated the Chagos Archipelago from the colony of Mauritius on 8 November 1965 to form the British Indian Ocean Territory. The General Assembly adopted three resolutions on the question between 1965 and 1967, while Mauritius was still a non-self-governing territory: resolution 2066 (XX), which dealt with Mauritius alone, and resolutions 2232 (XXI) and 2357 (XXII), which dealt with a group of territories including Mauritius. Its Special Committee on Decolonization adopted a resolution on Mauritius, Seychelles and St Helena in June 1967. Mauritius became independent on 12 March 1968.

By resolution 71/292 of 22 June 2017 the General Assembly asked the ICJ for an advisory opinion on the separation of the archipelago, with reference to the obligations "reflected in" resolutions 1514 (XV), 2066 (XX), 2232 (XXI) and 2357 (XXII). After the court gave its opinion, the Assembly adopted resolution 73/295 of 22 May 2019, which demanded that the United Kingdom withdraw its colonial administration from the archipelago within six months. The legal effect of the resolutions has been disputed: the ICJ treated them as reflecting the United Kingdom's obligation to respect the territorial integrity of Mauritius, while the United Kingdom has maintained that General Assembly resolutions are not binding.

== Resolutions ==
Votes are given as in favour–against–abstaining. (Note: The vote figures are those announced at the meeting. For resolutions adopted by recorded (roll-call) vote, the meeting records list how each state voted.)

United Nations resolutions concerning the Chagos Archipelago
Resolution	Date	Body	Title	Vote	Summary	Article
2066 (XX)	16 December 1965	General Assembly (1,398th plenary meeting)	"Question of Mauritius"	89–0–18 (no roll call)	Noted "with deep concern" that any step to detach islands from Mauritius "for the purpose of establishing a military base" would contravene the Declaration on the Granting of Independence; invited the administering power "to take no action which would dismember the Territory of Mauritius and violate its territorial integrity".	Resolution 2066 (XX)
2232 (XXI)	20 December 1966	General Assembly (1,500th plenary meeting)	"Question of American Samoa, Antigua, Bahamas ... Mauritius ... Seychelles ... and the United States Virgin Islands" (Note: Full title: "Question of American Samoa, Antigua, Bahamas, Bermuda, British Virgin Islands, Cayman Islands, Cocos (Keeling) Islands, Dominica, Gilbert and Ellice Islands, Grenada, Guam, Mauritius, Montserrat, New Hebrides, Niue, Pitcairn, St. Helena, St. Kitts-Nevis-Anguilla, St. Lucia, St. Vincent, Seychelles, Solomon Islands, Tokelau Islands, Turks and Caicos Islands and the United States Virgin Islands".)	93–0–24 (recorded vote); operative paragraph 4 adopted separately by 72–18–27	Concerned a group of territories including Mauritius and Seychelles. Reiterated that "any attempt aimed at the partial or total disruption of the national unity and the territorial integrity of colonial Territories and the establishment of military bases and installations in these Territories is incompatible with the purposes and principles of the Charter".	Resolution 2232 (XXI)
A/AC.109/249	19 June 1967	Special Committee (539th meeting) (Note: The Special Committee on the Situation with regard to the Implementation of the Declaration on the Granting of Independence to Colonial Countries and Peoples (the "Committee of Twenty-Four") is a subsidiary organ of the General Assembly, established by resolution 1654 (XVI).)	Resolution on Mauritius, Seychelles and St. Helena	17–2–3 (roll call; Australia and the United States against)	Deplored "the dismemberment of Mauritius and Seychelles by the administering Power which violates their territorial integrity, in contravention of General Assembly resolutions 2066 (XX) and 2232 (XXI)", and called on the administering power to return the detached islands. Declared the establishment of military installations in the territories a violation of resolution 2232 (XXI).	–
2357 (XXII)	19 December 1967	General Assembly (1,641st plenary meeting)	"Question of American Samoa, Antigua, Bahamas ... Mauritius ... Seychelles ... and the United States Virgin Islands" (Note: Full title: as for resolution 2232 (XXI), with Swaziland added: "Question of American Samoa, Antigua, Bahamas, Bermuda, British Virgin Islands, Cayman Islands, Cocos (Keeling) Islands, Dominica, Gilbert and Ellice Islands, Grenada, Guam, Mauritius, Montserrat, New Hebrides, Niue, Pitcairn, St. Helena, St. Kitts-Nevis-Anguilla, St. Lucia, St. Vincent, Seychelles, Solomon Islands, Swaziland, Tokelau Islands, Turks and Caicos Islands and the United States Virgin Islands".)	86–0–27 (recorded vote); operative paragraph 4 adopted separately by 78–16–16	Expressed deep concern at the continuation of policies aimed at disrupting the territorial integrity of some of the territories and at creating military bases in them. Repeated the declaration in paragraph 4 of resolution 2232 (XXI).	Resolution 2357 (XXII)
71/292	22 June 2017	General Assembly (88th plenary meeting)	"Request for an advisory opinion of the International Court of Justice on the legal consequences of the separation of the Chagos Archipelago from Mauritius in 1965"	94–15–65 (recorded vote)	Asked the ICJ whether the decolonisation of Mauritius was "lawfully completed" in 1968, and what consequences arose from the United Kingdom's continued administration of the archipelago, "including with respect to the inability of Mauritius to implement a programme for the resettlement on the Chagos Archipelago of its nationals, in particular those of Chagossian origin".	Resolution 71/292
73/295	22 May 2019	General Assembly (83rd plenary meeting)	"Advisory opinion of the International Court of Justice on the legal consequences of the separation of the Chagos Archipelago from Mauritius in 1965"	116–6–56 (recorded vote)	Affirmed that "the Chagos Archipelago forms an integral part of the territory of Mauritius", and demanded that the United Kingdom "withdraw its colonial administration from the Chagos Archipelago unconditionally within a period of no more than six months". Called on the United Nations, its specialised agencies and other organisations not to recognise or give effect to measures taken by or on behalf of the "British Indian Ocean Territory".	Resolution 73/295

== Related general resolutions ==
The following resolutions do not deal specifically with the Chagos Archipelago, but were invoked in connection with it by the ICJ, by the General Assembly in resolution 71/292, or by the states concerned.

Related resolutions
Resolution	Date	Body	Title	Connection with the Chagos Archipelago
66 (I)	14 December 1946	General Assembly	"Transmission of information under Article 73e of the Charter"	Its list of non-self-governing territories included Mauritius. The ICJ observed that this was how "the whole of Mauritius, including its dependencies", came to appear on the Assembly's list, so that in 1965 the archipelago was "clearly an integral part of that non-self-governing territory".
1514 (XV)	14 December 1960	General Assembly	"Declaration on the Granting of Independence to Colonial Countries and Peoples"	Adopted by 89 votes to none, with 9 abstentions. Its paragraph 6, under which "any attempt aimed at the partial or total disruption of the national unity and the territorial integrity of a country is incompatible with the purposes and principles of the Charter", was recalled in resolutions 2066 (XX) and 71/292. The ICJ held that, although "formally a recommendation", it has "a declaratory character with regard to the right to self-determination as a customary norm". Article: Declaration on the Granting of Independence to Colonial Countries and Peoples.
1541 (XV)	15 December 1960	General Assembly	"Principles which should guide Members in determining whether or not an obligation exists to transmit the information called for under Article 73 e of the Charter"	The ICJ relied on its Principle VI and held that self-determination "must be the expression of the free and genuine will of the people concerned".
1654 (XVI)	27 November 1961	General Assembly	"The situation with regard to the implementation of the Declaration on the granting of independence to colonial countries and peoples"	Established the Special Committee on Decolonization, which reported on Mauritius and the British Indian Ocean Territory in the 1960s.
249 (1968)	18 April 1968	Security Council (1,414th meeting)	"Admission of new members to the United Nations"	Recommended the admission of Mauritius; adopted unanimously. The United Kingdom pointed out that no member referred to the Chagos Archipelago when the Council discussed the application. Article: United Nations Security Council Resolution 249.
2371 (XXII)	24 April 1968	General Assembly (1,643rd plenary meeting)	"Admission of Mauritius to membership in the United Nations"	Adopted by acclamation. The United Kingdom and the United States argued before the ICJ that no member state raised the Chagos Archipelago or objected to the British Indian Ocean Territory arrangements when Mauritius was admitted.
2625 (XXV)	24 October 1970	General Assembly	"Declaration on Principles of International Law concerning Friendly Relations and Co-operation among States in accordance with the Charter of the United Nations"	Adopted by consensus. The ICJ cited it for the duty of every state "to render assistance to the United Nations" in implementing self-determination, in holding that all member states must co-operate with the United Nations to complete the decolonisation of Mauritius.
2832 (XXVI)	16 December 1971	General Assembly (2,022nd plenary meeting)	"Declaration of the Indian Ocean as a zone of peace"	Adopted by 61 votes to none, with 55 abstentions. In 1974 Mauritius told the General Assembly that any decision to extend facilities on Diego Garcia "would constitute a flagrant violation of the United Nations resolution on the subject". The United Kingdom noted that between 1982 and 1998 Mauritius referred to the archipelago in the general debate with particular reference to military bases and the Assembly's zone of peace resolutions. Follow-up resolutions have been adopted every two years since 1999, most recently resolution 80/13 of 1 December 2025. Article: United Nations General Assembly Resolution 2832 (XXVI).
65/118, 65/119 and 71/122	10 December 2010; 6 December 2016	General Assembly	Resolutions on the fiftieth anniversary of resolution 1514 (XV), the Third International Decade for the Eradication of Colonialism, and the implementation of resolution 1514 (XV)	Recalled in the preamble of resolution 71/292.

== Reports of the Secretary-General under resolution 73/295 ==
Resolution 73/295 asked the Secretary-General to report to the General Assembly at its 74th session on its implementation, "including any actions taken by the United Kingdom of Great Britain and Northern Ireland and other Member States".

Reports of the Secretary-General
Symbol	Date	Contents
A/74/834	18 May 2020	Replies received as at 18 May 2020 to notes verbales of 10 December 2019, from Argentina, Australia, Azerbaijan, Mauritius, Russia, the United Kingdom and the United States, and from the Food and Agriculture Organization, the Office of the United Nations High Commissioner for Human Rights and the Universal Postal Union.

In its reply, reproduced in the report, the United Kingdom said that resolution 73/295 "does not and cannot create any legal obligations for States Members of the United Nations".

== Other United Nations bodies ==
The Special Committee on Decolonization continued to address the British Indian Ocean Territory in its reports after 1967; according to Mauritius, in a report adopted in 1969 it said that the construction of military bases there was "incompatible with the Charter". Mauritius also cited questions put to the United Kingdom about the archipelago by the Human Rights Committee in 1985 and 1989. The Committee on the Elimination of Racial Discrimination, a treaty body, urged the United Kingdom in 2016 to consult the Chagossians "to facilitate their return to their islands". In December 2025 the Committee on the Elimination of Racial Discrimination, under its early-warning procedure, noted that the treaty was pending domestic ratification and called on both states "to suspend the ratification of the bilateral agreement". It objected that the treaty "explicitly prevents the return of the Chagossian people to their ancestral lands in Diego Garcia Island", and to the reported lack of consultation with Chagossians. According to a statement issued on their behalf, the procedure had been triggered on 26 May 2025, four days after the treaty was signed, by two Chagossian women born on Diego Garcia who opposed the treaty, Bertrice Pompe and Bernadette Dugasse. Mauritius told the committee in December 2025 that it deplored the decision, which it said caused "serious prejudice to the Republic of Mauritius as a sovereign state", and a British minister told the House of Lords in January 2026 that "The UK does not agree with the approach that the CERD has taken".

== Significance ==
In its 2019 advisory opinion the ICJ recalled that General Assembly resolutions, "even if they are not binding, may sometimes have normative value". It held that, "by inviting the United Kingdom to comply with its international obligations in conducting the process of decolonization of Mauritius, the General Assembly acted within the framework of the Charter". It described resolutions 2232 (XXI) and 2357 (XXII) as "more general in nature". It concluded that "the obligations arising under international law and reflected in the resolutions adopted by the General Assembly during the process of decolonization of Mauritius require the United Kingdom, as the administering Power, to respect the territorial integrity of that country, including the Chagos Archipelago". It added that the modalities for completing the decolonisation of Mauritius "fall within the remit of the United Nations General Assembly".

Mauritius argued that in resolution 2066 (XX) the Assembly "recognised the undivided territory of Mauritius as the unit of self-determination". The United Kingdom argued that "General Assembly resolutions are not binding under international law" and that resolution 2066 (XX) "did not contain binding obligations". The United States argued that resolution 2066 (XX) "does not represent the articulation of a binding legal obligation", and that the abstentions on resolutions 2066, 2232 and 2357 showed that their reading of paragraph 6 of resolution 1514 was not a consensus view.

In 2021 a special chamber of the International Tribunal for the Law of the Sea recalled that General Assembly resolutions are generally "only recommendatory in character", but held that resolution 73/295 "is relevant to assessing the legal status of the Chagos Archipelago". It found that the expiry of the six-month time limit without the United Kingdom complying "further strengthens" its finding on the British claim to sovereignty. On 22 May 2025 the United Kingdom and Mauritius signed an agreement concerning the archipelago.

== See also ==
- Chagos Archipelago sovereignty dispute
- Detachment of the Chagos Archipelago
- Expulsion of the Chagossians
- United Nations list of non-self-governing territories

== Sources ==
=== United Nations resolutions and records ===
- United Nations General Assembly (16 December 1965). "2066 (XX). Question of Mauritius". Resolutions adopted by the General Assembly during its twentieth session. Official Records of the General Assembly, Twentieth Session, Supplement No. 14 (A/6014) – via Memorial of Mauritius, Annex 38.
- United Nations General Assembly (20 December 1966). Resolution 2232 (XXI). Question of American Samoa, Antigua, Bahamas, Bermuda, British Virgin Islands, Cayman Islands, Cocos (Keeling) Islands, Dominica, Gilbert and Ellice Islands, Grenada, Guam, Mauritius, Montserrat, New Hebrides, Niue, Pitcairn, St. Helena, St. Kitts-Nevis-Anguilla, St. Lucia, St. Vincent, Seychelles, Solomon Islands, Tokelau Islands, Turks and Caicos Islands and the United States Virgin Islands (Report). General Assembly Official Records, Twenty-first Session, Supplement No. 16 (A/6316). United Nations.
- United Nations General Assembly (19 December 1967). Resolution 2357 (XXII). Question of American Samoa, Antigua, Bahamas, Bermuda, British Virgin Islands, Cayman Islands, Cocos (Keeling) Islands, Dominica, Gilbert and Ellice Islands, Grenada, Guam, Mauritius, Montserrat, New Hebrides, Niue, Pitcairn, St. Helena, St. Kitts-Nevis-Anguilla, St. Lucia, St. Vincent, Seychelles, Solomon Islands, Swaziland, Tokelau Islands, Turks and Caicos Islands and the United States Virgin Islands (Report). General Assembly Official Records, Twenty-second Session, Supplement No. 16 (A/6716). United Nations.
- United Nations General Assembly (22 June 2017). Resolution adopted by the General Assembly on 22 June 2017: 71/292. Request for an advisory opinion of the International Court of Justice on the legal consequences of the separation of the Chagos Archipelago from Mauritius in 1965 (A/RES/71/292) (Report). United Nations.
- United Nations General Assembly (24 May 2019). Resolution adopted by the General Assembly on 22 May 2019: 73/295. Advisory opinion of the International Court of Justice on the legal consequences of the separation of the Chagos Archipelago from Mauritius in 1965 (A/RES/73/295) (Report). United Nations.
- United Nations General Assembly (14 December 1946). Resolution 66 (I). Transmission of information under Article 73e of the Charter (Report). United Nations.
- United Nations General Assembly (15 December 1960). Resolution 1541 (XV). Principles which should guide Members in determining whether or not an obligation exists to transmit the information called for under Article 73 e of the Charter (Report). United Nations.
- United Nations General Assembly (27 November 1961). Resolution 1654 (XVI). The situation with regard to the implementation of the Declaration on the granting of independence to colonial countries and peoples (Report). United Nations.
- United Nations Security Council (18 April 1968). Resolution 249 (1968) of 18 April 1968: Admission of new members to the United Nations (S/RES/249(1968)) (Report). United Nations.
- United Nations General Assembly (24 April 1968). Resolution 2371 (XXII). Admission of Mauritius to membership in the United Nations (Report). United Nations.
- United Nations General Assembly (24 October 1970). Resolution 2625 (XXV). Declaration on Principles of International Law concerning Friendly Relations and Co-operation among States in accordance with the Charter of the United Nations (Report). United Nations.
- United Nations General Assembly (16 December 1971). Resolution 2832 (XXVI). Declaration of the Indian Ocean as a zone of peace (Report). General Assembly Official Records, Twenty-sixth Session, Supplement No. 29 (A/8429). United Nations.
- United Nations General Assembly (1 December 2025). Resolution 80/13. Implementation of the Declaration of the Indian Ocean as a Zone of Peace (A/RES/80/13) (Report). United Nations.
- United Nations General Assembly (16 December 1965). Official Records, Twentieth Session, 1398th plenary meeting, 16 December 1965 (A/PV.1398) (Report). United Nations.
- United Nations General Assembly (20 December 1966). Official Records, Twenty-first Session, 1500th plenary meeting, 20 December 1966 (A/PV.1500) (Report). United Nations.
- United Nations General Assembly (19 December 1967). Official Records, Twenty-second Session, 1641st plenary meeting, 19 December 1967 (A/PV.1641) (Report). United Nations.
- United Nations General Assembly (24 April 1968). Official Records, Twenty-second Session, 1643rd plenary meeting, 24 April 1968 (A/PV.1643) (Report). United Nations.
- United Nations General Assembly (16 December 1971). Official Records, Twenty-sixth session, 2022nd plenary meeting, 16 December 1971 (A/PV.2022) (Report). United Nations.
- United Nations General Assembly (22 June 2017). Official Records, Seventy-first session, 88th plenary meeting, Thursday, 22 June 2017 (A/71/PV.88) (Report). United Nations.
- United Nations General Assembly (22 May 2019). Official Records, Seventy-third session, 83rd plenary meeting, Wednesday, 22 May 2019, 10 a.m. (A/73/PV.83) (Report). United Nations.
- Special Committee on the Situation with regard to the Implementation of the Declaration on the Granting of Independence to Colonial Countries and Peoples (11 October 1967). Report of the Special Committee (A/6700/Add.8) (PDF) (Report). United Nations – via Written Statement of Mauritius, Annex 92.
- United Nations Secretary-General (18 May 2020). Advisory opinion of the International Court of Justice on the legal consequences of the separation of the Chagos Archipelago from Mauritius in 1965: Report of the Secretary-General (A/74/834) (Report). United Nations.
- Committee on the Elimination of Racial Discrimination (3 October 2016). Concluding observations on the twenty-first to twenty-third periodic reports of the United Kingdom (CERD/C/GBR/CO/21-23) (Report).
- Committee on the Elimination of Racial Discrimination (2 December 2025). Decision 1 (2025): Mauritius and the United Kingdom (early warning and urgent action procedure, INT/CERD/EWU/11263), advance unedited version (Report). Office of the United Nations High Commissioner for Human Rights.

=== Court decisions and pleadings ===
- Legal Consequences of the Separation of the Chagos Archipelago from Mauritius in 1965, Advisory Opinion (PDF). I.C.J. Reports 2019. International Court of Justice. 25 February 2019. p. 95.
- Dispute concerning delimitation of the maritime boundary between Mauritius and Maldives in the Indian Ocean (Mauritius/Maldives), Preliminary Objections, Judgment (PDF). ITLOS Reports 2020–2021. International Tribunal for the Law of the Sea. 28 January 2021. p. 17.
- Written Statement of the Republic of Mauritius (PDF). Vol. I. International Court of Justice. 1 March 2018.
- Reference to Chagos Archipelago in Annual Statements made by Mauritius to the United Nations General Assembly (PDF). Written Statement of the Republic of Mauritius, Annex 100. International Court of Justice. 1 March 2018.
- Counter-Memorial of the United Kingdom. Permanent Court of Arbitration. 15 July 2013.
- Written Statement of the United Kingdom (PDF). International Court of Justice. 15 February 2018.
- Written Statement of the United States of America (PDF). International Court of Justice. 1 March 2018.

=== Other sources ===
- Diver, Tony (5 June 2025). "Starmer's Chagos deal reported to UN human rights chiefs". The Daily Telegraph.
- "Diego Garcia Military Base and British Indian Ocean Territory Bill". Hansard, House of Lords. 5 January 2026.
- Prime Minister's Office (Mauritius) (12 December 2025). Highlights of Cabinet Meeting – Friday 12 December 2025 (PDF) (Report). Government of Mauritius.
- Ozkan, Mevlut (8 December 2025). "UN committee urges UK, Mauritius to respect Chagossians' right to return to Diego Garcia Island". Anadolu Agency.
- "Chagossian activists challenge legality of new bilateral agreement". Seychelles Nation. 10 June 2025.
- Agreement between the Government of the United Kingdom of Great Britain and Northern Ireland and the Government of the Republic of Mauritius concerning the Chagos Archipelago including Diego Garcia (CS Mauritius No.1/2025, CP 1334) (Report). Foreign, Commonwealth and Development Office. 22 May 2025.
