= Ian Brownlie =

British barrister and academic (1932–2010)

Sir Ian Brownlie CBE, QC, FBA
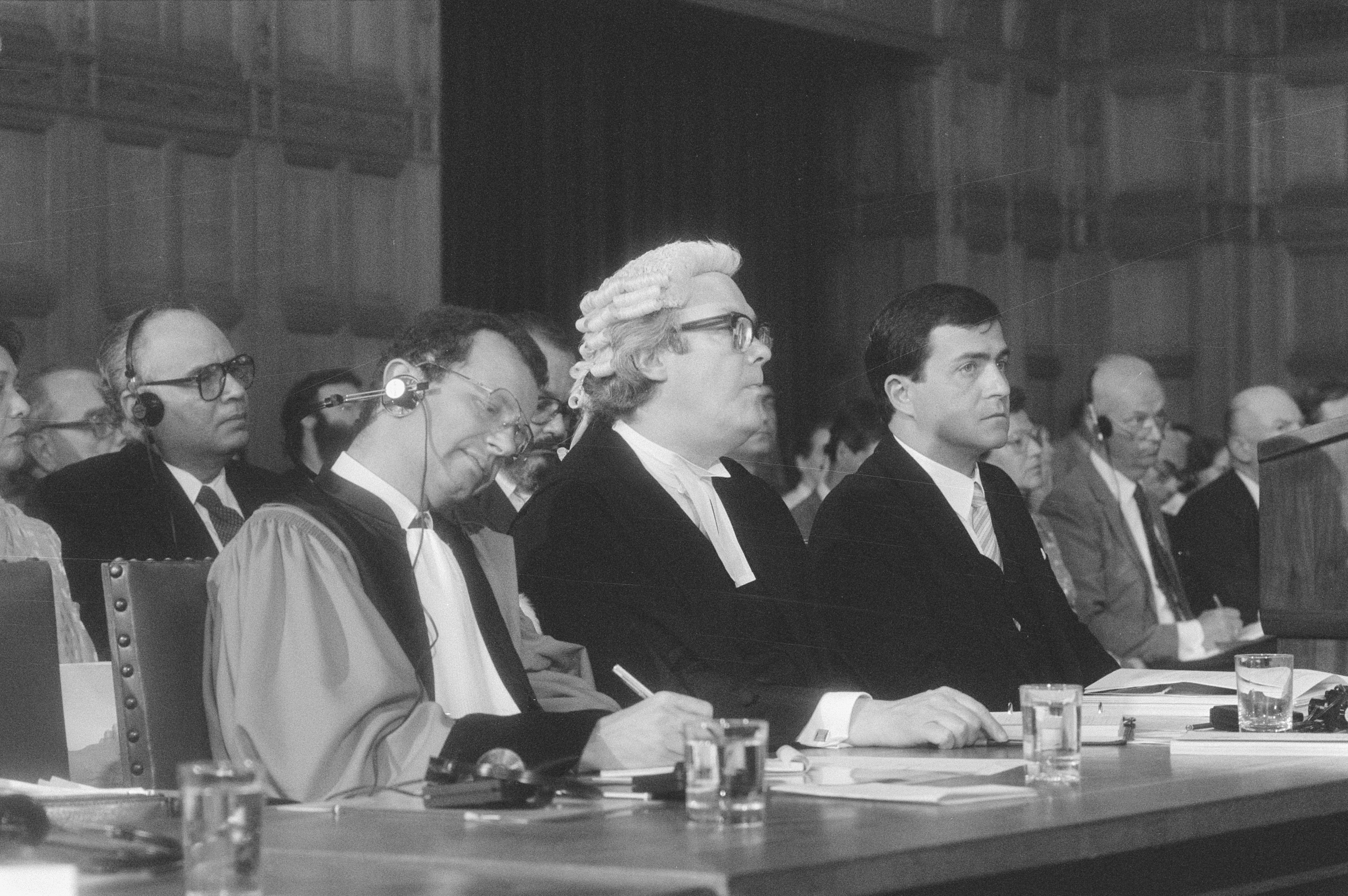
- l.t.r. Alain Pellet, {Ian Brownlie and Carlos Argüello Gómez (Nicaragua v. United States)
- Born: 19 September 1932; Bootle, Liverpool, England
- Died: 3 January 2010 (aged 77); Cairo, Egypt
- Occupation: Barrister

Academic background
- Education: Alsop High School
- Alma mater: Hertford College, Oxford (BA, BCL, DPhil)
- Thesis: International Law and the Use of Force by States (1963)
- Doctoral advisor: Sir Humphrey Waldock

Academic work
- Institutions: All Souls College, Oxford; University of Leeds; University of Nottingham; London School of Economics
- Doctoral students: James Crawford, Benedict Kingsbury, Stefan Talmon

Sir Ian Brownlie, CBE, QC, FBA (19 September 1932, Liverpool – 3 January 2010, Cairo) was an English barrister and academic, specialising in international law. He was Chichele Professor of Public International Law from 1980 to 1999.

== Early life and education ==
Brownlie was born in Bootle, Liverpool; his father worked for an insurance company. He was evacuated during the Second World War to Heswell, near Wirral, going a year without any formal education after the local school was bombed. He attended Alsop High School. He then attended Hertford College, Oxford as a Gibbs Scholar in 1952 and received a first-class BA in law in 1953. Speaking of this time, C. H. S. Fifoot described Brownlie his "ablest student". He was the Vinerian Scholar with the highest marks on the BCL. He was a Humanitarian Trust Student at King's College, Cambridge in 1955 where he studied public international law. He completed his DPhil at Oxford in 1961 under the supervision of Humphrey Waldock, his thesis being later published in 1963 as International Law and the Use of Force by States. He received the higher doctorate DCL from Oxford in 1976.

He was called to the Bar by Gray's Inn in 1958; he began practice some years later in 1967 at 2 Crown Office Row. He was a tenant at Blackstone Chambers from 1983 until his death on 3 January 2010. He was a member of the Communist Party of Great Britain until the Soviet Union's invasion of Czechoslovakia in 1968.

== Career ==
He began his academic career at the University of Nottingham as a lecturer from 1957 to 1963. He was a fellow and tutor in law at Wadham College, Oxford from 1963 to 1976 and a University of Oxford lecturer from 1964 to 1976. In 1976, he took silk. He was appointed professor of international law at the London School of Economics between 1976 and 1980. He was reader of public international law at the Inns of Court School of law from 1973 to 1976. From 1980 to 1999, he was Chichele Professor of Public International Law and a Fellow of All Souls College at the University of Oxford; he was appointed a Distinguished Fellow of All Souls in 2004. He was director of studies at the International Law Association from 1982 to 1991. He was lecturer at The Hague Academy of International Law in 1979 and 1995. He retired from Oxford in 1999, upon reaching the statutory mandated retirement age.

In the international arena, he served as an advisor to United States President Jimmy Carter during the 1979 Iranian Hostage Crisis.

At the International Court of Justice, he represented clients in over 40 contentious cases, including Nicaragua v. United States, Nauru v. Australia, Bosnia and Herzegovina v. Serbia and Montenegro, the Pedra Branca dispute, Libya v. United Kingdom, Libya v. United States, and Democratic Republic of the Congo v. Uganda.

He also argued several important cases before the European Court of Human Rights, including Cyprus v. Turkey.

In 1998 and 1999, he represented Amnesty International at the extradition trial of Chilean coup-leader Augusto Pinochet before the English courts.

From 1997 to 2008, he was a member of the United Nations' International Law Commission. and from 1974 to 1999, he was editor of The British Yearbook of International Law.

Brownlie was a Fellow of the British Academy and a member of the International Law Association and the Institut de Droit International. In 2006, he was awarded the Wolfgang Friedmann Memorial Award for international law. He was knighted in the 2009 Birthday Honours.

== Personal life ==
In 1957, Brownlie married Jocelyn Gale with whom he had one son and two daughters; the marriage was dissolved in 1975. He remarried in 1978, marrying Christine Apperley. Brownlie died in a car accident in Cairo on 3 January 2010; his wife and daughter were also in the car, his wife sustaining broken ribs. His daughter Rebecca was also killed. The man driving the vehicle was convicted of involuntary manslaughter. Brownlie's wife Christine Brownlie brought an action suing for damage which occurred in England even though the accident occurred in Egypt; the case was decided in the Supreme Court of the United Kingdom in FS Cairo v Brownlie [2021] UKSC 45. The court found in favour of Christine Brownlie in what was described as a landmark ruling.

== Publications ==
Several of Brownlie's published works are considered standard texts in their fields:

- International Law and the Use of Force between States (Oxford doctoral thesis, 1963)
- Principles of Public International Law (1966) (8th ed., 2012)
- Basic Documents in International Law (1967) (6th ed., 2008)
- Basic Documents on Human Rights (1971) (5th ed., 2006)
- African Boundaries: A Legal and Diplomatic Encyclopedia (1979)
- System of the Law of Nations: State Responsibility (1983)
