= Detachment of the Chagos Archipelago =

1965 separation of the Chagos Archipelago from colonial Mauritius

The detachment of the Chagos Archipelago was the separation of the Chagos Archipelago from the British colony of Mauritius by an Order in Council made on 8 November 1965. The order combined the archipelago with the islands of Aldabra, Farquhar and Desroches, detached from Seychelles, to form a new colony, the British Indian Ocean Territory (BIOT). It followed talks between the United Kingdom and the United States, begun formally in February 1964, on using British-held islands in the Indian Ocean for defence purposes, in which the United States sought a military facility on Diego Garcia. British and American officials agreed that the islands should be detached from Mauritius and Seychelles and placed under direct British administration, with Britain responsible for acquiring the land, resettling the population and paying compensation, and the United States for building the facilities.

When the proposal was put to them in July 1965, the Mauritian ministers objected to detachment and asked for a lease instead. At meetings held alongside the September 1965 constitutional conference in London, the Premier of Mauritius, Seewoosagur Ramgoolam, and two other ministers agreed in principle on 23 September 1965 to detachment in return for British undertakings that included £3 million in compensation and the return of the islands when no longer needed for defence. The Mauritius Council of Ministers confirmed the agreement on 5 November 1965, with the ministers of the Parti Mauricien Social Démocrate dissenting. The British government announced on 24 September 1965 that Mauritius would become independent, which it did on 12 March 1968 without the archipelago.

The British records released in later decades show that ministers had resolved to detach the islands, if necessary without Mauritian consent, and that the Prime Minister, Harold Wilson, told Ramgoolam on the morning of 23 September that he could return home "either with Independence or without it". Mauritius has argued that its ministers therefore had no real choice; the United Kingdom has argued that their consent was freely negotiated, given after independence had been announced, and confirmed by Mauritius for years after independence. In 2019 the International Court of Justice concluded that the detachment "was not based on the free and genuine expression of the will of the people concerned" and that the decolonisation of Mauritius had not been lawfully completed.

== Background ==
=== Chagos as a dependency of Mauritius ===
By the Treaty of Paris of 1814, France ceded Mauritius and all its dependencies to the United Kingdom. Between 1814 and 1965, the Chagos Archipelago was administered by the United Kingdom as a dependency of the colony of Mauritius. The Mauritius Constitution Order of 1964 defined the colony as "the island of Mauritius and the Dependencies of Mauritius". In April 1965 a Colonial Office note for the Cabinet's Defence and Oversea Policy Committee stated that "there can be no legal doubts" that the Chagos Archipelago formed part of the Lesser Dependencies of Mauritius, and that separating it would require amendments to the existing constitutional instruments. The two governments later differed on the significance of that status: Mauritius described the archipelago as administered "as a constituent part of Mauritius", while the United Kingdom described the link as an administrative arrangement under which the islands were "very loosely administered from Mauritius".

=== Constitutional position of the colony in 1964–1965 ===
Under the 1964 Mauritius Constitution Order, the colony had a Legislative Assembly of 40 elected members, together with the Speaker, the Chief Secretary and up to 15 members nominated by the Governor. Its Council of Ministers was made up of the Premier, the Chief Secretary and 10 to 13 ministers appointed by the Governor after consultation with the Premier. In 1964 the United Nations Special Committee on Decolonization (the "Committee of Twenty-Four") reported that the constitution did not allow the representatives of the people to exercise real powers and that authority was "nearly all concentrated in the hands of the United Kingdom Government and its representatives". After the 1963 election, Ramgoolam led an all-party coalition government that negotiated with the United Kingdom on independence.

=== Strategic context ===
A British Cabinet committee paper of April 1964 noted that the Americans had "no forces or bases between the Pacific and Mediterranean, apart from a few naval vessels in the Persian Gulf", and that their interest in the Indian Ocean had gained impetus from the Chinese attack on India in 1962. The same paper described British strategy in the region as resting on the bases at Aden and Singapore and the staging posts at Masirah and Gan, and saw American facilities on British islands as "a very valuable insurance policy at a relatively small premium" against the loss of any of them. In December 1963 the United States announced that a naval task force would make periodic visits to the Indian Ocean, which the British government welcomed.

== Anglo-American planning (1962–1965) ==
=== Origins ===
According to a chronology later compiled by the British government, the idea of using British islands in the Indian Ocean for American defence purposes went back at least to 1962, and took definite shape in 1963. In April 1963 the United States Department of State proposed talks on the "strategic use of certain small British-owned islands in the Indian Ocean", and in August 1963 it asked to survey Diego Garcia for a military communications station; the British put the request off because elections were imminent in Mauritius.

=== February 1964 talks ===
Formal talks between British and American officials took place in London from 25 to 27 February 1964. The agreed memorandum recorded American interest in a communications facility on Diego Garcia, "which is now under the administration of Mauritius", and in "austere" support facilities there, with Aldabra and the Cocos (Keeling) Islands as lower priorities. The American delegation said that it wished "to avoid the political problems arising from the development of military facilities in populated areas" and to have assured security of tenure for at least 25 years. The two delegations agreed that it would be imprudent to carry out a survey until the constitutional future of Diego Garcia and the rest of the archipelago had been determined. The British delegation undertook to recommend that the British government acquire land, resettle the population and pay compensation at its own expense, that the United States pay all construction and maintenance costs and share the facilities, and that the transfer of the administration of Diego Garcia, the rest of the Chagos Archipelago and the Agaléga islands from Mauritius be pursued "as rapidly as possible".

=== April 1964 Cabinet committee paper ===
In April 1964 the Foreign Office, the Colonial Office and the Ministry of Defence submitted a joint memorandum to the Cabinet's Defence and Oversea Policy (Official) Committee. It warned that it would be "imprudent to expose ourselves to international and local criticism of trafficking in Colonial territory without regard to the reasonable interests of the colonies concerned". It concluded that the course "which would best satisfy our major interests" was to decide now to detach Diego Garcia and the other Chagos islands, and possibly Agaléga, from Mauritius "well in advance of Mauritian independence", placing them under direct British administration by Order in Council. It noted that formally the government had the constitutional power to act without the consent of the Mauritius government, but that doing so would expose it to criticism in Parliament and the United Nations. According to the ICJ, the paper considered that such criticism would lose most of its force if Mauritian ministers accepted the detachment beforehand, "whether such acceptance was obtained by positive consent or by acquiescence", and that it would best suit British interests to present detachment as "a fait accompli" or to tell Mauritius "at the last moment". A Foreign Office official, Crispin Tickell, described the paper as a compromise between the Foreign Office and Ministry of Defence's wish to meet American requirements and the Colonial Office's reluctance to detach the islands from the administration of Mauritius and Seychelles. On 6 May 1964 ministers approved the proposals in principle, but decided that the authorities in Mauritius and Seychelles should only "at a suitable time be informed in general terms" about the proposed detachment.

=== First approach to Ramgoolam and the 1964 survey ===
On 29 June 1964, the Governor of Mauritius, Sir John Rennie, raised the idea of detachment with Ramgoolam, who was favourably disposed to providing "facilities" but preferred a long-term lease. The chronology records that Ramgoolam also asked for the benefit of any minerals that might be found and had no objection to a survey. In July 1964 the Governor informed the Council of Ministers of the proposed survey, but did not mention detachment.

In July and August 1964, a joint Anglo-American team surveyed the Chagos Archipelago and several islands of Seychelles. The Colonial Office member of the team, Robert Newton, reported that there should be "no insurmountable obstacle to the removal, resettlement and re-employment of the civilian population of islands required for military purposes". His report gave the population of the archipelago in July 1964 as 1,364. It warned that removing the islands from the jurisdiction of Mauritius risked "considerable political difficulties", and that any final decision could not be independent of "any beneficial interest of Mauritius" in the archipelago.

=== American requirements ===
In January 1965 the United States set out its requirements in order of priority. Diego Garcia was required for a communications station and supporting facilities, including an airstrip, and the Americans considered that "detachment proceedings should include entire Chagos Archipelago, primarily in interest security but also to have available other sites in Archipelago for future contingencies". They planned to break ground for permanent facilities in late 1966 and have the station operational in late 1968. Aldabra was recommended as an air staging post, and since the British intended "single-bite" detachment proceedings, the Americans urged them to consider "stockpiling" Coëtivy, Agaléga, Farquhar, Desroches and Cosmoledo "on precautionary planning basis". In February 1965 the US embassy wrote that it considered detachment of the whole archipelago "highly desirable" though not essential, because "full detachment now might more effectively assure that Mauritian political attention, including any recovery pressure, is diverted from Diego Garcia over the long run". The same letter said that there would be no reason to relocate the population of an island before it came into use, and that this would apply to the other Chagos islands "so long as our activity was confined to Diego Garcia".

A Foreign Office brief of March 1965 summarised the American position: any islands chosen "must be free from local pressures which would threaten security of tenure", and "in practice this must mean that the islands would be detached from the administration of Mauritius (soon due for independence) and of the Seychelles". In April 1965 the Colonial Secretary, Anthony Greenwood, circulated a legal note confirming that both the Chagos Archipelago and the Seychelles islands were legally part of the colonies concerned, and proposing a new territory on the model of the British Antarctic Territory Order in Council 1962. On 30 April the Foreign Office informed Washington that the islands chosen were Diego Garcia and the rest of the Chagos Archipelago, and Aldabra, Farquhar and Desroches, while Agaléga, Coëtivy and Cosmoledo should be dropped. The telegram added that "in each case the islands are legally part of the territory of the colony concerned", so that generous compensation would be needed to secure the acceptance of the local governments, "which we regard as fundamental for the constitutional detachment of the islands".

=== Secret American contribution ===
The Foreign Office estimated the total cost of detachment at up to £10 million, and asked the United States to contribute. The United States offered to pay up to half, not directly but by deducting an agreed amount from British payments for research and development on the Polaris missile programme. The Colonial Office instructed the Governors of Mauritius and Seychelles in July 1965 that "this fact and the method of payment ... must be kept strictly secret". In November 1965 Greenwood told Wilson that the Americans wanted their contribution kept secret "for Congressional reasons and in order to restrain the local governments from trying to put up the price".

== Consultation with Mauritian ministers (July–August 1965) ==
On 19 July 1965, the Colonial Office instructed the Governor to open discussions with the Council of Ministers. The telegram described the agreement of the Mauritius government as something "which we regard as essential", and said the object was to "gauge what it might be necessary to offer to secure willing and public acquiescence". The islands were to be "constitutionally separated" from Mauritius and established "by Order in Council as a separate British administration"; the islands would not be made available on any other basis, such as a lease. A further telegram set out the planned administration, under which people from Diego Garcia, and from other islands "when evacuated", would be resettled in other islands such as Agaléga rather than in Mauritius or Seychelles.

On 23 July 1965, the Governor reported that ministers, "while not ill-disposed", had asked for time to consider. "Dislike of detachment" had been expressed by both Ramgoolam and Gaëtan Duval of the PMSD, and the Governor added that "it was clear however that any attempt to detach without agreement would provoke strong protest". Ramgoolam raised the question of mineral rights and the reversion of the islands to Mauritius if they ceased to be needed for defence. The Governor reported interest in the project "as bargaining counter for the benefit of Mauritius", and that ministers had mentioned an American sugar quota.

At the next meeting of the Council of Ministers, on 30 July, ministers said that they were "sympathetically disposed" to the request but that detachment "would be unacceptable to public opinion in Mauritius", and asked for a long-term lease, for example of 99 years. They also asked for safeguards for mineral rights, a preference for Mauritius in any grant of fishing or agricultural rights, and that any agreement over Diego Garcia "provide also for the defence of Mauritius". The Governor reported that these views "were subscribed to by all the Ministers present", that the attitude to detachment was "awkward but not unexpected", and that ministers had "taken responsible line and given collective view". On 13 August 1965, he conveyed to ministers that a lease was unacceptable; they proposed discussions in London and "were clearly not prepared to agree here and now". The Governor reported that he had not been able to obtain the desired agreement and that pressing further would be "counter productive".

== Preparations for the constitutional conference (August 1965) ==
At a meeting on 24 August 1965, the Chiefs of Staff Committee noted that the Colonial Secretary had not been able to persuade the Mauritian ministers to agree to detachment before the conference. A Colonial Office representative told the committee that the Colonial Secretary "was anxious to detach the Chagos Archipelago by consent and was disinclined to detach it arbitrarily by an Order in Council, which would have international political repercussions". Summing up, the Chief of the Defence Staff, Field Marshal Richard Hull, said that the committee agreed with the Foreign Office that it was "a matter of prime importance" that the detachment be achieved before any moves towards Mauritian independence, "whether partial or complete". The Chiefs of Staff were willing, if necessary, to offer Mauritius a defence agreement covering external defence and internal security if that was "the only way" to ensure "the successful outcome of our negotiations to detach the Chagos Archipelago".

On 26 August 1965, the Deputy Secretary of State for Defence, Fred Mulley, and a Foreign Office minister, Lord Walston, submitted a memorandum to the Cabinet's Defence and Oversea Policy Committee (OPD(65)124). It reported that the Seychelles Executive Council had been "lukewarm but raised no objection of principle" and had suggested that a civil airfield on Mahé would be satisfactory compensation, while the Mauritian ministers had raised difficulties and preferred a 99-year lease. It warned: "If we fail to persuade them now, we may never again be in a position to do so at an acceptable cost. Indeed if Mauritius opts for independence at this conference, this will be our last chance to secure the Chagos Archipelago." The memorandum treated American opposition to a lease as decisive, since the Americans had said that they were unlikely to go through with the project unless the islands were permanently detached, and argued that any lease "is bound to bring Mauritius under very strong Afro-Asian pressure to revise it in due course". It proposed offering Mauritius development aid of about £3 million and a promise of continued British responsibility for its external defence. It concluded:

If Mauritius Ministers refuse this offer, they should be told that, in that case, HMG will have to consider any proposals for the future status of Mauritius without the Chagos Archipelago, and will exercise their right to transfer Chagos to permanent British sovereignty under order-in-council, financial compensation as above being paid to the Mauritius Government.

A Foreign Office brief prepared for the committee's meeting described the conference as possibly "our last chance" and noted that the paper recommended proceeding "if necessary even without local consent". It anticipated criticism at the United Nations under resolution 1514 (XV), and proposed answering that the islands had been joined to Mauritius "solely for the administrative convenience of the colonial power" and that their inhabitants were "few and nearly all contract labourers". At the meeting on 31 August, chaired by Wilson, Mulley said that the agreement of the Mauritian ministers "should be obtained if possible but in any event the decision to detach the islands should be taken before the end of the Mauritius Constitutional Conference". Wilson, summing up, said that a decision on whether to detach the islands by Order in Council if the Mauritian ministers did not agree need not be taken yet, but that the British position "should in no way be prejudiced" during the conference.

On 3 September 1965, Greenwood and Ramgoolam agreed that the defence talks should be kept separate from the conference. A Foreign Office minute of the same day recorded the Colonial Office plan to have talks on the "support facilities" proceed in parallel with the constitutional talks, "the object being to link both up for a possible package deal at the end". The ICJ observed that "it appears that this approach was later modified to link both matters in a possible package deal".

== Fourth Constitutional Conference (September 1965) ==
The fourth constitutional conference on Mauritius opened in London on 7 September 1965 and ended on 24 September. It was mainly concerned with the division between the parties favouring independence, led by Ramgoolam's Mauritius Labour Party, and the PMSD, which preferred association with the United Kingdom and demanded a referendum. A Colonial Office note of 15 September recorded that the Labour Party claimed majority support for independence, while the PMSD argued that a majority might reject independence if the question were put to the people, and noted that the possible need for a defence treaty and internal-security arrangements "establishes a link between the two sets of negotiations".

=== Meetings of 13, 15 and 20 September ===
The defence question was discussed at private meetings chaired by Greenwood. At the first, on 13 September, Ramgoolam said that Mauritius preferred a lease to detachment. According to the British record, the Muslim Committee of Action leader, Abdool Razack Mohamed, said that he recognised Mauritius "must in her own interests make facilities available", and the independent minister Maurice Paturau said that Mauritius "should agree". The ministers asked for an American sugar quota of 300,000 tons, special facilities for Mauritian emigrants and tripartite talks with the United States; the British replied that tripartite talks were "out of the question" because, under the Anglo-American arrangement, Britain alone was to provide the sites, and that American sugar quotas were a matter for Congress, so that a special arrangement for Mauritius would be against both Mauritian and Commonwealth interests. On 15 September the ministers met the Economic Minister at the US embassy, who said he would report their case to Washington. The same day, according to the ICJ, the Foreign and Defence Secretaries concluded that if Mauritius would not agree they would have to adopt the recommendation of "forcible detachment and compensation paid into a fund".

At the second meeting, on 20 September, Greenwood described his "double role" as spokesman of British interests and "custodian within the British Government of the interests of Mauritius". The PMSD leader, Jules Koenig, reported that the American officials had offered no concessions. Ramgoolam said that "the Mauritius Government was not interested in the excision of the islands and would stand out for a 99-year lease", at a rent of about £7 million a year for 20 years and £2 million thereafter; he called the offer of £1 million "derisory" and said he would rather make the transfer free than accept it. He proposed as an alternative that Britain grant independence first and let the Mauritius government negotiate over Diego Garcia afterwards. Paturau argued that Diego Garcia must be worth a substantial sugar quota to the United States, since alternatives in Seychelles would cost much more. Greenwood replied that the United States had been "so specific and categorical in insisting that British sovereignty must be retained over Chagos" that a lease would not be accepted, and that the project "might well fall through" if Mauritius insisted. When he suggested raising the compensation towards £2 million, Ramgoolam replied that the ministers "had not come to bargain" and "could not bargain over their relationship with the United Kingdom and the Commonwealth". Mohamed said that if only Britain were involved, Mauritius would hand Diego Garcia over "without any compensation", but that with the United States involved they wanted a continuing benefit, above all a sugar quota. Greenwood said that he thought it would be feasible to provide for the return of the archipelago to Mauritius if British and American defence interests in it ceased. Summing up, he warned that there was no prospect of the ministers obtaining anything approaching their demands, and that "it would be cheaper to build an island than pay the sums suggested".

The arbitral tribunal in the Chagos Marine Protected Area case found that, over three meetings, the Mauritian leaders pressed for continuing economic benefits, and that the United Kingdom, while refusing to seek concessions from the United States, raised its offer of lump-sum compensation from £1 million to £3 million and introduced the prospect of returning the archipelago when no longer needed for defence.

=== Briefing for the Prime Minister (22 September) ===
On 22 September 1965, Wilson's Private Secretary, Oliver Wright, sent him a note before his meeting with Ramgoolam the next morning:

The object is to frighten him with hope: hope that he might get independence; Fright lest he might not unless he is sensible about the detachment of the Chagos Archipelago.

The attached Colonial Office brief recorded that the four party leaders and Paturau "cannot contemplate detachment but propose a long lease". It said that all departments had accepted the importance of securing consent, but that "in the last resort, however, detachment could be carried out without Mauritius consent", and it ended with the sentence Wright called its key point: "The Prime Minister may therefore wish to make some oblique reference to the fact that H.M.G. have the legal right to detach Chagos by Order in Council, without Mauritius consent but this would be a grave step." The brief also advised that Ramgoolam "should not leave the interview with certainty as to H.M.G.'s decision as regards independence", because it might be necessary later in the conference to press him to accept safeguards for minorities. It described the secret American contribution through Polaris costs, marked in the margin "not for mention". In an attached minute, Greenwood wrote: "I am sure that we should not seem to be trading Independence for detachment of the Islands", and suggested that agreement would be easier if Ramgoolam were assured that the islands would be returned when no longer needed and offered a defence agreement and compensation of perhaps £5 million rather than the £3 million approved.

=== Wilson–Ramgoolam meeting (23 September) ===
According to the British record of the meeting, Ramgoolam told Wilson that independence was "the right answer" for Mauritius. Wilson said that the detachment of Diego Garcia "was of course a completely separate matter and not bound up with the question of Independence". He said that he had heard that some of Ramgoolam's colleagues, seeing that the United States was a very rich country, "were perhaps raising their bids rather high", that Diego Garcia "was not all that important", and that "this was a matter between Britain and Mauritius". Ramgoolam said that Mauritius was concerned about its growing population and hoped for a guaranteed American sugar purchase rather than a lump sum. Wilson said that Diego Garcia's administration by Mauritius was "a purely historical accident" and that its links with Mauritius were "very slight". The record continues:

The Prime Minister went on to say that, in theory, there were a number of possibilities. The Premier and his colleagues could return to Mauritius either with Independence or without it. On the Defence point, Diego Garcia could either be detached by order in Council or with the agreement of the Premier and his colleagues. The best solution of all might be Independence and detachment by agreement, although he could not of course commit the Colonial Secretary at this point.

Ramgoolam replied that "the question of Diego Garcia was a matter of detail; there was no difficulty in principle".

=== Lancaster House meeting (23 September) ===
That afternoon, Greenwood met Ramgoolam, Sookdeo Bissoondoyal of the Independent Forward Bloc, Mohamed and Paturau at Lancaster House; Koenig was not present. Greenwood said that he had to report the outcome to his colleagues at 4 p.m. and was "anxious that a decision should be reached at the present meeting". He said that "it appeared that the Chagos site was not indispensable and there was therefore a risk that Mauritius might lose this opportunity", that the British government was anxious to settle the matter by agreement, but that other British ministers were aware "that it would be possible for the British Government to detach them from Mauritius by Order in Council". Ramgoolam asked again whether the archipelago could be leased; Greenwood said this was not acceptable. When Bissoondoyal asked whether the islands would revert to Mauritius if the need for the facilities disappeared, Greenwood said that he was prepared to recommend this. Mohamed said his party was ready "to leave the bases question to the discretion of H.M.G.". Ramgoolam spoke of a gap of some £4 million a year in development funding, and Greenwood suggested that £2 million of the compensation might be paid in ten annual instalments. Paturau asked that his disagreement be recorded, saying that the sum was too small and that he foresaw "serious political trouble over it in Mauritius".

Greenwood then asked whether Ramgoolam, Bissoondoyal and Mohamed would agree to detachment on the understanding that he would recommend to the Cabinet a list of undertakings, later known as the Lancaster House undertakings, numbered as in paragraph 22 of the final record:

1. negotiations for a defence agreement between Britain and Mauritius;
2. consultation between the two governments, in the event of independence, if a difficult internal security situation arose in Mauritius;
3. compensation of up to £3 million to the Mauritius government, in addition to direct compensation to landowners and the cost of resettling others affected;
4. British good offices with the United States in support of Mauritian requests for concessions over sugar imports and the supply of wheat and other commodities;
5. British efforts to persuade the United States to use Mauritian labour and materials in construction;
6. British good offices to keep navigational and meteorological facilities, fishing rights and use of the airstrip for emergencies available to Mauritius as far as practicable;
7. the return of the islands to Mauritius if the need for the facilities disappeared;
8. the benefit of any minerals or oil discovered in or near the archipelago to revert to the Mauritius government.

Ramgoolam said that this was acceptable to him, Bissoondoyal and Mohamed in principle, but that he wished to consult his other ministerial colleagues. The Parliamentary Under-Secretary for the Colonies, Lord Taylor, urged the ministers "not to risk losing the substantial sum offered and the important assurance of a friendly military presence nearby". Greenwood left for Downing Street with authority from Ramgoolam and Bissoondoyal to report their acceptance in principle, subject to negotiation of details; Mohamed gave the same assurance for himself and his colleague Osman, and Paturau said he was unable to concur. Items (vi) and (viii) were added to the record after the meeting, at the request of Ramgoolam and Mohamed in a handwritten letter of 1 October 1965.

=== Anglo-American talks (23–24 September) ===
British and American officials met in London on 23 and 24 September 1965. According to the British record, a Colonial Office official, A. J. Fairclough, told the Americans that the independence and defence questions had been kept separate but that "the outcome of the latter was found to depend partly on the former problem", and that "both pro and anti independence parties regarded the defence project as a bargaining counter which they might use either to achieve or to avoid complete independence". The two sides considered that the Chagos and Seychelles islands should be detached "as a single operation" to avoid "a second row" at the United Nations. British officials described a detachment in three stages, the last being that an island with defence facilities "would be free from local civilian inhabitants". On 24 September Fairclough reported that Ramgoolam and a majority of the ministers present had agreed to detachment, and it was agreed that the term "detachment" should be avoided in public statements.

=== Announcement on independence (24 September) ===
On 24 September 1965, the last day of the conference, Greenwood announced that the British government intended Mauritius to become independent. Independence was to follow a general election under a new electoral system, after which, if the new Legislative Assembly so resolved, a date would be fixed after six months of internal self-government. The PMSD delegation had walked out of the conference before the announcement.

== Council of Ministers decision (October–November 1965) ==
On 6 October 1965, the Colonial Office instructed the Governor to obtain "early confirmation" that the Mauritius government agreed to detachment on the conditions in paragraph 22 of the Lancaster House record. The despatch stated that the archipelago "will remain under British sovereignty" and that the British government had "taken careful note" of the undertakings on return and on minerals and oil. A Colonial Office letter of 8 October explained that confirmation was needed because the Governor had first raised the matter with the full Council of Ministers, whereas the London talks had involved only the main party leaders and one independent minister, and the "last and critical meeting" had taken place without Koenig. On 27 October the Foreign Office asked the UK Mission to the United Nations when the Fourth Committee would discuss Mauritius, because any hostile reference to detachment could jeopardise the final discussions in the Council of Ministers.

On 5 November 1965, the Governor reported that the Council of Ministers had "confirmed agreement to the detachment of Chagos Archipelago on conditions enumerated", on the understanding that the British government had in fact agreed to the return and minerals undertakings, and that the return undertaking excluded any sale or transfer to a third party and any payment by Mauritius as a condition of return. He added that the PMSD ministers had dissented and were considering their position in the government. Greenwood informed Wilson that Koenig and his PMSD colleagues "were not opposed in principle to the proposals but considered that the compensation arrangements are inadequate". The PMSD ministers later left the government; the constitutional commissioner for Mauritius, S. A. de Smith, wrote in 1968 that they did so "ostensibly on the ground that the compensation was inadequate".

The same day, Greenwood urged Wilson to complete the detachment quickly. He wrote that the United Kingdom would be "accused of creating a new colony in a period of decolonisation and of establishing new military bases when we should be getting out of the old ones". He warned that if the Fourth Committee raised the matter before detachment, "the Mauritius Government will be under considerable pressure to withdraw their agreement", and that it was "therefore important that we should be able to present the U.N. with a fait accompli". A Foreign Office telegram to New York explained that, "in view of possible publicity and consequent pressure on the Mauritius and Seychelles Governments to change their minds", the government was proceeding with detachment immediately.

== British Indian Ocean Territory Order ==
On 8 November 1965, the British Indian Ocean Territory Order 1965 established the BIOT as a new colony consisting of the Chagos Archipelago and the islands of Aldabra, Farquhar and Desroches. The Order was made under the Colonial Boundaries Act 1895 and the royal prerogative, and created the office of Commissioner, first held by the Governor of Seychelles, with power to make laws for the "peace, order and good government" of the territory. It also amended the 1964 Mauritius constitution so that the dependencies of Mauritius no longer included the archipelago. The same day, the Colonial Office told the Governor that "the Chagos Archipelago will remain under British sovereignty" and that there was "no intention of permitting prospecting for minerals or oils on or near them". Guidance sent to the UK Mission to the United Nations stated that "the islands chosen have virtually no permanent inhabitants".

On 10 November, Greenwood told the House of Commons that the arrangements had been introduced "with the agreement of the Governments of Mauritius and Seychelles", gave the populations as about 1,000 for the Chagos Archipelago and 100, 172 and 112 for Aldabra, Farquhar and Desroches, and said that "no firm plans have yet been made" for defence facilities. On 19 November the Colonial Office told the Governor that the undertaking on return could be given publicly only if it was made clear that "a decision about the need to retain the islands must rest entirely with the United Kingdom Government" and that it would not be open to Mauritius to press for their return on its own initiative. On 21 December 1965, answering questions in the Mauritius Legislative Assembly, the government stated that if the British government decided that the archipelago was no longer required for defence, the islands would be returned to Mauritius. The Aldabra, Farquhar and Desroches islands were returned to Seychelles on its independence in 1976.

== Reaction at the United Nations ==
When the United Kingdom announced the new territory in the Fourth Committee of the General Assembly on 16 November 1965, its representative described it as "an administrative re-adjustment, freely worked out with the Government and elected representatives of the people concerned". The UK Mission reported that speakers had accused the United Kingdom of creating a new colony, of detaching land from a colony "regardless of compensation ('hush money') paid", of damaging the interests of a minority even if the representatives of the majority had been persuaded to agree, and of violating resolution 1514 (XV). On 16 December 1965, the General Assembly adopted resolution 2066 (XX), which noted "with deep concern that any step taken by the administering Power to detach certain islands from the Territory of Mauritius for the purpose of establishing a military base would be in contravention" of resolution 1514 (XV), and invited the United Kingdom "to take no action which would dismember the Territory of Mauritius and violate its territorial integrity".

In February 1966 the UK Mission to the United Nations advised London that "it would not be difficult for our critics to develop the arguable thesis that detachment by itself was a breach of Article 73" of the Charter, and that it seemed "difficult to avoid the conclusion that the new territory is a non-self-governing territory". Resolutions 2232 (XXI) of 1966 and 2357 (XXII) of 1967 reiterated that disrupting the territorial integrity of colonial territories and establishing military bases in them was incompatible with the Charter. In June 1967 the Committee of Twenty-Four deplored "the dismemberment of Mauritius and Seychelles" and called on the United Kingdom to return the detached islands.

== Question of consent ==
=== Contemporary British records ===
The British records show that ministers and officials believed the United Kingdom could detach the islands by Order in Council without Mauritian consent, preferred to obtain consent, and in August 1965 planned to tell the Mauritian ministers, if they refused, that Britain would consider their country's future status "without the Chagos Archipelago". In 1967, when it appeared that the secret American contribution might become public, a draft ministerial minute warned that the government would be accused of having "deliberately deceived the Mauritius Government in order to secure their agreement to the separation from Mauritius of the Chagos Archipelago at a low level of compensation", noting that Wilson had told Ramgoolam the matter was only between Britain and Mauritius. The draft added that Mauritius had "only agreed with the utmost reluctance to compensation limited to £3m. when it was thought that Britain was meeting the full amount".

=== Mauritian position ===
In the Mauritian Legislative Assembly on 11 April 1979, Ramgoolam said of the detachment, "we had no choice". On 25 November 1980, asked in the Assembly whether the excision had been contrary to UN resolutions, he said that agreement had not been necessary: "We were a colony", and "Great Britain could have excised the Chagos Archipelago". The Minister of External Affairs, Harold Walter, said in June 1980: "What choice did we have? We had no choice! We had to consent to it because we were fighting alone for independence!" A select committee of the Mauritian Legislative Assembly, set up in 1982, reported in June 1983 that the "blackmail element" in the negotiations "strongly puts in question the legal validity of the excision". According to the committee's report, Ramgoolam told it that during the private talks at Lancaster House he had been "put before the choice of either retaining the archipelago or obtaining independence", but he "refused to describe the deal as a blackmail". Before the arbitral tribunal and the ICJ, Mauritius argued that its ministers' consent was given under duress, because they were told that independence and detachment were linked and that the islands could be detached without their agreement, and that in any case colonial ministers could not validly consent to the dismemberment of the territory.

=== British position ===
The United Kingdom has called the portrayal of detachment as a condition of independence "a wholly inaccurate portrayal, invented by Mauritius many years after the relevant events", noting that Mauritius first raised a legal argument of duress in 2012. It has argued that its commitment to independence was announced on 24 September 1965, six weeks before the Council of Ministers gave its agreement on 5 November, and that the move towards independence would not have stopped had the council refused. It has also argued that the Mauritian ministers negotiated actively, raised the compensation offered, obtained the undertaking that the islands would be returned, and secured further conditions after the conference. It points out that the detachment was public knowledge when the pro-independence parties won the general election of 7 August 1967 and the new Legislative Assembly voted for independence.

The United Kingdom has also relied on statements by Ramgoolam after independence. In the Legislative Assembly on 26 June 1974, he said that the Mauritian government had given its consent and that "even if we did not want to detach it, I think, from the legal point of view, Great Britain was entitled to make arrangements as she thought fit and proper". In a press statement on 27 June 1980, he said: "We were consulted and we agreed to give away Diego Garcia and the British Government paid us 3 million in compensation." In the same Assembly debate of 25 November 1980 in which he said Britain "could have excised" the archipelago, he answered a question on whether excision had been a precondition of independence: "It was a matter that was negotiated, we got some advantage out of this and we agreed." The independence constitution of 1968 defined Mauritius without the archipelago, which was not included in the constitutional definition of Mauritius until 1992.

=== Findings of courts and tribunals ===
In the 2015 Chagos Marine Protected Area arbitration, the majority of the tribunal held that it had no jurisdiction over the sovereignty dispute, and recorded that "the Parties differ regarding the extent to which Mauritian consent to the detachment was given voluntarily". The tribunal held that the Lancaster House undertakings were legally binding on the United Kingdom. In a dissenting and concurring opinion, Judges James Kateka and Rüdiger Wolfrum wrote that "Mauritius had no choice" because "the detachment of the Chagos Archipelago was already decided whether Mauritius gave its consent or not", and that Wilson's statement that Ramgoolam could return home without independence "amounts to duress".

In its 2019 advisory opinion, the ICJ observed that when the Council of Ministers agreed in principle to the detachment, Mauritius was a colony under British authority, and that "it is not possible to talk of an international agreement, when one of the parties to it, Mauritius, which is said to have ceded the territory to the United Kingdom, was under the authority of the latter". It held that "heightened scrutiny should be given to the issue of consent" when part of a non-self-governing territory is separated to create a new colony, and concluded that the detachment "was not based on the free and genuine expression of the will of the people concerned". The court found, by 13 votes to 1, that the decolonisation of Mauritius had not been lawfully completed in 1968. The dissenting judge, Joan Donoghue, did not address the circumstances of the detachment; she considered that the court should have declined to give the opinion because it circumvented the absence of British consent to adjudication of a bilateral sovereignty dispute. She wrote that the events leading to the detachment and the treatment of the Chagossians "cry out for an authoritative judicial pronouncement".

== Aftermath ==
=== Agreement with the United States and depopulation ===
On 30 December 1966, the United Kingdom and the United States concluded an agreement making the BIOT available for the defence needs of both governments, with an Agreed Minute providing that the British administrative measures would include "resettling any inhabitants". Between 1967 and 1973, the entire population of the archipelago was either prevented from returning or removed. The independence constitution of 12 March 1968 defined Mauritius as the territories that immediately before that date made up the colony, which did not include the Chagos Archipelago. On 9 October 1980, the Prime Minister of Mauritius told the UN General Assembly that the BIOT should be disbanded and the territory restored to Mauritius.

=== Return of the Seychelles islands (1975–1976) ===
As Seychelles moved towards independence, its opposition leader, France-Albert René, and less insistently its Prime Minister, James Mancham, called for the return of Aldabra, Farquhar and Desroches. In February 1975 the Foreign Secretary, James Callaghan, proposed returning the three islands; Wilson replied that the issue should be discussed by ministers, and the Americans' first reaction was that the status quo should be maintained "for fear of an unravelling effect on BIOT endangering Diego Garcia".

British officials put forward several reasons for returning the islands. A brief for the Anglo-American consultations of November 1975 argued that their return would "virtually assure the peaceful and orderly transition of Seychelles to independence", whereas refusal risked René walking out of the resumed constitutional conference. It also argued that it would be difficult to defend keeping the islands "on the off chance" of future defence use, because they were populated: "After the outcry over the workers removed from the Chagos Archipelago, it would be extremely difficult politically to do the same thing in the ex-Seychelles islands." Other reasons given were that the return might be presented to Mauritius as "an earnest of good intent" that the Chagos Archipelago too would be returned when no longer needed, might stop Seychelles and Mauritius "making common cause" on the BIOT in the Organisation of African Unity and the United Nations, might allay suspicion of American intentions at Diego Garcia, and could be traded for concessions.

A State Department paper of October 1975 concluded that there was no likelihood that the three islands would be used for military purposes "for the next 10–15 years". It recorded that a joint airfield planned on Aldabra in 1967 had been dropped "for economic and ecological reasons (the threat to the endangered giant tortoise)", that the decision to build on Diego Garcia made developing other islands unnecessary, and that the islands' small populations "would have to be displaced in the full glare of Congressional and public scrutiny". It observed that the wider BIOT "now serves only as a buffer to protect our interests in Diego", and that a BIOT reduced to the Chagos Archipelago would bring to the fore its status "as a former dependency of Mauritius". The paper also stated that the British government had provided Seychelles with £6.2 million, in the form of the construction of Mahé airport, as compensation for the three islands, against £3 million paid to Mauritius for the Chagos Archipelago, and that Mauritius might cite this as a precedent.

The main argument against return, considered by both governments, was that it might encourage Mauritius to press for the return of the Chagos Archipelago. At the talks in Washington on 7 November 1975, British officials argued that "essentially Mauritius had no leverage over Chagos whereas Seychelles" had leverage in its independence negotiations, and that it was better to deal with any Mauritian protests in isolation than to give Mauritius and Seychelles an opportunity to make common cause. The British side said that "we were agreed that there was no real defence need to keep the three islands", and that recent parliamentary and congressional pressure over "the former contract workers" pointed to "the undesirability of giving hostages to fortune". The conditions discussed in return included denial of the three islands to any hostile power, emergency access for American and British forces, denial of Seychelles itself to hostile forces, and terms for the American satellite tracking station on Mahé.

On 8 March 1976, the Mauritian High Commissioner in London, Sir Leckraz Teelock, asked for Mauritius to be represented at the forthcoming talks, saying that a change in the nature of the BIOT would affect Mauritian interests. The Parliamentary Under-Secretary, Ted Rowlands, refused, saying that the talks concerned only the three islands and that "we were now returning the ex-Seychelles islands since we had no defence requirement for them". In a letter of 15 March 1976 he assured Mauritius that the British government would stand by its understandings on the former Mauritian islands, "in particular that they will be returned to Mauritius when they are no longer needed for defence purposes in the same way as the three ex-Seychelles islands are now being returned to Seychelles".

Heads of agreement signed on 18 March 1976 by representatives of the United Kingdom, the BIOT administration and Seychelles, including Mancham and René, provided for the return of the islands on condition that Seychelles would not permit the armed forces of any state to use its territory, except states that already had rights there; that those states would have access to the islands for emergency defence needs; and that Seychelles would maintain strict nature conservation, on Aldabra in consultation with the Royal Society. The Foreign Office instructed the High Commission in Port Louis not to reveal these conditions to the Mauritians, so as not to embarrass the Seychelles government in the eyes of the OAU. The islands were returned to Seychelles on its independence on 29 June 1976.

== See also ==
- Expulsion of the Chagossians
- Chagos Archipelago sovereignty dispute
- List of UN resolutions concerning the Chagos Archipelago
- Independence of Mauritius

== Sources ==
=== Court decisions ===
- Donoghue, Joan (25 February 2019). Dissenting Opinion of Judge Donoghue (PDF). I.C.J. Reports 2019. International Court of Justice.
- Legal Consequences of the Separation of the Chagos Archipelago from Mauritius in 1965, Advisory Opinion (PDF). I.C.J. Reports 2019. International Court of Justice. 25 February 2019.
- Kateka, James; Wolfrum, Rüdiger (18 March 2015). Dissenting and Concurring Opinion of Judge James Kateka and Judge Rüdiger Wolfrum. Permanent Court of Arbitration.
- In the Matter of the Chagos Marine Protected Area Arbitration (Mauritius v. United Kingdom): Award (PDF). Permanent Court of Arbitration. 18 March 2015.

=== Pleadings ===
- Memorial of the Republic of Mauritius. Vol. I. Permanent Court of Arbitration. 1 August 2012.
- Written Statement of the United Kingdom (PDF). International Court of Justice. 15 February 2018.

=== Archive documents and parliamentary records ===
Documents marked "MM" are reproduced in the annexes to the Memorial of Mauritius in the Chagos Marine Protected Area arbitration; documents marked "ICJ" are reproduced in volume II of the annexes to the Written Statement of Mauritius in the ICJ advisory proceedings.

- Anglo/US Consultations on the Indian Ocean: November 1975, Agenda Item III, Brief No. 4: Future of Aldabra, Farquhar and Desroches (PDF). Foreign and Commonwealth Office. November 1975 – via MM Annex 75.
- Brief for the Secretary of State at the D.O.P. Meeting on Tuesday, 31 August: Defence Facilities in the Indian Ocean (PDF). Foreign Office. 27 August 1965. TNA FO 371/184527 – via ICJ Annex 50.
- The British Indian Ocean Territory Order 1965 (S.I. 1965/1920) (PDF). 8 November 1965 – via MM Annex 32.
- "British Indian Ocean Territory" 1964–1968: Chronological Summary of Events relating to the Establishment of the "B.I.O.T." in November, 1965 and subsequent agreement with the United States concerning the Availability of the Islands for Defence Purposes (PDF). TNA FCO 32/484 – via MM Annex 3.
- British Indian Ocean Territory: The Ex-Seychelles Islands – Memorandum by the Secretary of State for Foreign and Commonwealth Affairs, OPD(75)23 (PDF). Cabinet, Defence and Oversea Policy Committee. 4 July 1975. TNA FCO 40/674 – via MM Annex 72.
- Brown, F. D. W. (2 February 1966). Despatch from the UK Mission to the United Nations, New York, to C. G. Eastwood, Colonial Office (PDF) – via MM Annex 40.
- Colonial Office Telegram No. 198 to Mauritius, No. 219 to Seychelles (PDF). 19 July 1965. TNA FO 371/184526 – via MM Annex 10.
- Colonial Office Telegram No. 199 to Mauritius, No. 222 to Seychelles (PDF). 21 July 1965. TNA FO 371/184524 – via MM Annex 11.
- Defence Facilities in the Indian Ocean: Memorandum by the Deputy Secretary of State for Defence and the Parliamentary Under-Secretary of State for Foreign Affairs, OPD(65)124 (PDF). Cabinet, Defence and Oversea Policy Committee. 26 August 1965 – via ICJ Annex 48.
- Defence Interests in the Indian Ocean: Legal Status of Chagos, Aldabra, Desroches and Farquhar – Note by the Secretary of State for the Colonies, OPD(65)73 (PDF). Cabinet, Defence and Oversea Policy Committee. 27 April 1965 – via ICJ Annex 32.
- Disposition of the Seychelles Islands of the BIOT (PDF). Office of International Security Operations, Bureau of Politico-Military Affairs, United States Department of State. 31 October 1975 – via MM Annex 74.
- Fairclough, A. J. (22 May 1967). Minute from A. J. Fairclough, Colonial Office, to a Minister of State, with a Draft Minute for the Secretary of State for Commonwealth Affairs addressed to the Foreign Secretary (PDF). TNA FCO 16/226 – via MM Annex 49.
- Foreign and Commonwealth Office Telegram No. 43 to the British High Commission, Port Louis (PDF). 19 March 1976. TNA FCO 40/732 – via MM Annex 80.
- Foreign Office Telegram No. 3582 to Washington (PDF). 30 April 1965. TNA FO 371/184523 – via MM Annex 9.
- Foreign Office Telegram No. 4310 to the UK Mission to the United Nations, New York (PDF). 6 November 1965. TNA FO 371/184529 – via MM Annex 28.
- Foreign Office Telegram No. 4327 to the UK Mission to the United Nations, New York (PDF). 8 November 1965 – via MM Annex 30.
- Greenwood, Anthony (5 November 1965). Minute from the Secretary of State for the Colonies to the Prime Minister (PDF). TNA FO 371/184529 – via MM Annex 26.
- Heads of Agreement between the Government of the United Kingdom, the Administration of the British Indian Ocean Territory and the Government of Seychelles concerning the Return of Aldabra, Desroches and Farquhar to Seychelles to be Executed on Independence Day (PDF). 18 March 1976. TNA FCO 40/732 – via MM Annex 79.
- Hunt, John (14 July 1975). British Indian Ocean Territory: The Ex-Seychelles Islands (OPD(75)23): briefing note to the Prime Minister (PDF). TNA PREM 16/2264 – via MM Annex 73.
- Letter from the Colonial Office to the Foreign Office (PDF). 8 October 1965. TNA FO 371/184529 – via MM Annex 22.
- Mauritius Constitutional Conference: Report by the Defence Planning Staff (COS 154/65), with minutes of the 43rd meeting of 24 August 1965 (PDF). Ministry of Defence, Chiefs of Staff Committee. 26 August 1965 – via ICJ Annex 47.
- Mauritius Legislative Assembly, Reply to PQ No. B/1141 (PDF). 25 November 1980 – via MM Annex 96.
- Mauritius Telegram No. 170 to the Colonial Office (PDF). 23 July 1965. TNA FO 371/184526 – via MM Annex 12.
- Mauritius Telegram No. 175 to the Colonial Office (PDF). 30 July 1965. TNA FO 371/184526 – via MM Annex 13.
- Mauritius Telegram No. 188 to the Colonial Office (PDF). 13 August 1965. TNA FO 371/184526 – via MM Annex 15.
- Mauritius – Defence Issues: Record of a Meeting in the Colonial Office at 9.00 a.m. on Monday, 20th September, 1965 (PDF). 20 September 1965. TNA FO 371/184528 – via MM Annex 16.
- Memorandum of U.K./U.S. London Discussions: U.S. Defence Interests in the Indian Ocean (PDF). 27 February 1964. TNA FCO 31/3437 – via ICJ Annex 25.
- Minutes of a Meeting held at 10 Downing Street on Tuesday, 31st August, 1965, OPD(65) 37th Meeting (PDF). Cabinet, Defence and Oversea Policy Committee. 31 August 1965. TNA CAB 148/18 – via ICJ Annex 51.
- Minutes of Anglo-US Talks on the Indian Ocean held on 7 November 1975 (extract) (PDF). British Embassy, Washington. November 1975 – via MM Annex 76.
- Newman, George S. (10 February 1965). Letter from the Counselor for Politico-Military Affairs, US Embassy in London, to the Head of the Permanent Under-Secretary's Department, Foreign Office (PDF) – via MM Annex 7.
- Newton, Robert (1964). Report on the Anglo-American Survey in the Indian Ocean (PDF) (Report). TNA CO 1036/1332 – via MM Annex 2.
- Note for the Prime Minister's Meeting with Sir Seewoosagur Ramgoolam, Premier of Mauritius, with covering note by the Private Secretary and minute by the Colonial Secretary (PDF). Colonial Office. 22 September 1965. TNA PREM 13/3320 – via MM Annex 17.
- Peck, E. H. (3 September 1965). Minute to Mr. Graham: Indian Ocean Islands (PDF). Foreign Office. TNA FO 371/184527 – via ICJ Annex 52.
- Points for the Secretary of State at D.O.P. meeting, 9.30 a.m. Thursday, September 16th (PDF). Colonial Office, Pacific and Indian Ocean Department. 15 September 1965. TNA CO 1036/1146 – via ICJ Annex 54.
- Record of a Conversation between the Prime Minister and the Premier of Mauritius, Sir Seewoosagur Ramgoolam, at No. 10, Downing Street, at 10 a.m. on Thursday, 23 September 1965 (PDF). 23 September 1965. TNA FO 371/184528 – via MM Annex 18.
- Record of Conversation between the Parliamentary Under-Secretary of State for Foreign and Commonwealth Affairs and the Mauritius High Commissioner, London (PDF). 8 March 1976. TNA FCO 40/731 – via MM Annex 77.
- Record of UK–US Talks on Defence Facilities in the Indian Ocean, 23–24 September 1965 (PDF). 24 September 1965. TNA FO 371/184529 – via MM Annex 20.
- Report of the Select Committee on the Excision of the Chagos Archipelago (PDF) (Report). Mauritius Legislative Assembly. June 1983 – via MM Annex 97 (extract).
- Rowlands, Ted (15 March 1976). Letter from the Parliamentary Under-Secretary of State, Foreign and Commonwealth Office, to the Mauritius High Commissioner, London (PDF). TNA FCO 40/732 – via MM Annex 78.
- Secretary of State's Visit to Washington and New York, 21–24 March: Defence Interests in the Indian Ocean, Brief No. 14 (PDF). Foreign Office, Permanent Under-Secretary's Department. 18 March 1965. TNA FO 371/184524 – via MM Annex 8.
- Tickell, C. C. C. (28 April 1964). Minute to Mr. Palliser: United States Defence Interests in the Indian Ocean (PDF). Foreign Office. TNA FCO 31/3437 – via ICJ Annex 27.
- Trench, N. C. C. (15 January 1965). Letter from the British Embassy, Washington, to E. H. Peck, Foreign Office, enclosing the text of US Department of State instructions on Indian Ocean island requirements (PDF). TNA FO 371/184522 – via ICJ Annex 29.
- U.S. Defence Interests in the Indian Ocean: Memorandum by the Foreign Office, the Colonial Office and the Ministry of Defence, D.O.(O)(64)23 (PDF). Cabinet, Defence and Oversea Policy (Official) Committee. 23 April 1964. TNA FCO 31/3437 – via ICJ Annex 26.
- UK Mission to the United Nations, New York, Telegram No. 2971 to the Foreign Office (PDF). 16 November 1965 – via MM Annex 35.
- UK Mission to the United Nations, New York, Telegram No. 2972 to the Foreign Office (PDF). 16 November 1965 – via MM Annex 36.
