= United Nations General Assembly Resolution 2832 (XXVI) =

1971 UN General Assembly resolution declaring the Indian Ocean a zone of peace

UN General Assembly Resolution 2832 (XXVI)
- Date: 16 December 1971
- Meeting no.: 2022
- Code: A/RES/2832(XXVI) (Document)
- Subject: Declaration of the Indian Ocean as a zone of peace
- Voting summary: 61 voted for; None voted against; 55 abstained
- Result: Adopted

United Nations General Assembly Resolution 2832 (XXVI), the Declaration of the Indian Ocean as a Zone of Peace, was adopted by the United Nations General Assembly on 16 December 1971. It declared that the Indian Ocean "is hereby designated for all time as a zone of peace". It called on the great powers to consult the littoral states with a view to halting the expansion of their military presence in the ocean, and to eliminating "bases, military installations and logistical supply facilities" and nuclear weapons conceived in the context of great-power rivalry. The item was proposed by Ceylon, following a call by the Non-Aligned Movement in 1970. The resolution was adopted by 61 votes to none, with 55 abstentions, including those of the United Kingdom, the United States, the Soviet Union and France.

The declaration was adopted in the year in which the main forcible removal of the inhabitants of Diego Garcia, in the British Indian Ocean Territory, took place, in July and September 1971. Mauritius and its supporters later invoked the zone of peace against the base and in support of Mauritius' claim to the Chagos Archipelago. A 1975 United States Department of State paper noted that keeping the British Indian Ocean Territory intact would show the American intention "to reject the Zone of Peace concept". The General Assembly has continued to adopt resolutions on implementing the declaration, most recently in 2025.

== Background ==
At the Third Conference of Heads of State or Government of Non-Aligned Countries, held at Lusaka from 8 to 10 September 1970, the participants called on all states "to consider and respect the Indian Ocean as a zone of peace", from which great-power rivalries and the bases conceived in the context of such rivalries "should be excluded", and declared that the area should be free of nuclear weapons.

The United Kingdom had detached the Chagos Archipelago from Mauritius in 1965 to form the British Indian Ocean Territory. On 30 December 1966 it concluded an agreement with the United States making the territory available for the defence purposes of both governments. An Agreed Minute of the same date provided that the British administrative measures would include "resettling any inhabitants". On 16 April 1971 the BIOT Commissioner enacted an immigration ordinance making it unlawful to enter or remain in the archipelago without a permit. Between 1967 and 1973 the entire population was either prevented from returning or forcibly removed. The main removal from Diego Garcia took place in July and September 1971.

== Drafting and adoption ==
By a letter of 1 October 1971, Ceylon asked for an item entitled "Declaration of the Indian Ocean as a zone of peace" to be added to the agenda of the 26th session; Tanzania joined the request on 6 October. The Assembly allocated the item to the First Committee, which debated it together with six disarmament items from 11 November to 1 December 1971.

The draft resolution was submitted by Ceylon, Iran, Iraq, Kenya, Somalia, Uganda, Tanzania, Yemen and Zambia, and was later co-sponsored by Burundi and Swaziland. After revision, India and Yugoslavia also joined, and the representative of Ceylon introduced the final 13-power text on 10 December 1971. At the request of the Philippines and Madagascar, the committee voted separately on parts of the text. It adopted operative paragraph 1 by 47 votes to none, with 46 abstentions, and paragraphs 2 and 3 by 43 to none, with 55 abstentions. It adopted the draft as a whole by a roll-call vote of 50 to none, with 49 abstentions.

The General Assembly considered the First Committee's report at its 2022nd plenary meeting on 16 December 1971, under the presidency of Adam Malik of Indonesia. It again voted separately on the operative paragraphs, adopting paragraph 1 by 60 votes to none, with 55 abstentions, and paragraphs 2 and 3 by 52 votes to none, with 63 abstentions. It adopted the resolution as a whole by 61 votes to none, with 55 abstentions. Iraq and Sierra Leone later informed the Secretariat that they had wished to vote in favour.

Vote on resolution 2832 (XXVI) as a whole
Vote	Number	States (selection)
In favour	61	Including Ceylon, China, India, Indonesia, Iran, Japan, Kenya, Malaysia, Pakistan, Somalia, Sweden, Tanzania and Yugoslavia
Against	0	–
Abstaining	55	Including Australia, France, Madagascar, New Zealand, the Soviet Union, Singapore, the United Kingdom and the United States

Mauritius does not appear among the states recorded as voting in the committee or in plenary.

== Content ==
The preamble records the determination of the peoples of the littoral and hinterland states of the Indian Ocean to preserve their independence, sovereignty and territorial integrity. It recalls the Lusaka declaration, and expresses concern at "recent developments that portend the extension of the arms race into the Indian Ocean area". In the operative part, the General Assembly:

1. "solemnly declares that the Indian Ocean, within limits to be determined, together with the air space above and the ocean floor subjacent thereto is hereby designated for all time as a zone of peace";
2. calls on the great powers to enter into immediate consultations with the littoral states with a view to halting "the further escalation and expansion of their military presence in the Indian Ocean", and eliminating from it "all bases, military installations and logistical supply facilities", nuclear weapons and weapons of mass destruction, and "any manifestation of great Power military presence in the Indian Ocean conceived in the context of great Power rivalry";
3. calls on the littoral and hinterland states, the permanent members of the Security Council and other major maritime users of the ocean to consult on implementing the declaration, so that warships and military aircraft may not use the ocean for any threat or use of force against a littoral or hinterland state. Subject to that, "the right to free and unimpeded use of the zone by the vessels of all nations is unaffected";
4. asks the Secretary-General to report on progress at the 27th session; and
5. places the item on the agenda of that session.

== Follow-up ==
By resolution 2992 (XXVII) of 15 December 1972, the General Assembly noted that the consultations called for in 1971 "have not taken place". It established an Ad Hoc Committee on the Indian Ocean, of no more than fifteen members, to study the implications of the proposal. A meeting of the littoral and hinterland states of the Indian Ocean was held in New York in July 1979.

The Ad Hoc Committee still existed in the 2020s. In 2023 it had 43 members, among them Mauritius, the Maldives and Seychelles, with Sri Lanka holding the chair; the United Kingdom and the United States were not members. The General Assembly adopted resolutions on implementing the declaration every two years from 1999. Resolution 80/13 of 1 December 2025 asked the committee's chair to continue informal consultations and to report to the Assembly at its 82nd session.

== Connection with the Chagos Archipelago ==
=== Mauritian and international invocation ===
In 1974, the Mauritian Prime Minister, Seewoosagur Ramgoolam, referred in a speech to "rumours of a naval base at Diego Garcia, which Mauritius gave up prior to its Independence", and said: "We want the Indian Ocean to be a zone of peace". At the General Assembly in September 1974, Mauritius said that any British and American decision to extend facilities on Diego Garcia "would constitute a flagrant violation of the United Nations resolution on the subject". In 1982 Prime Minister Anerood Jugnauth told the Assembly that Diego Garcia was "now a full-fledged nuclear base". He called it a threat to the security of Mauritius and of the states of "the very Ocean declared to be a zone of peace by this Assembly in 1971".

In July 1980 the Organisation of African Unity adopted resolution AHG/Res. 99 (XVII) on Diego Garcia. Declaring that "the militarization of Diego Garcia is a threat to Africa, and to the Indian Ocean as a zone of peace", it demanded that the island "be unconditionally returned to Mauritius and that its peaceful character be maintained". Judge Antônio Augusto Cançado Trindade recalled the resolution in his separate opinion on the 2019 advisory opinion. At its 1983 summit in New Delhi, the Non-Aligned Movement said that "the establishment and strengthening of the military base at Diego Garcia has endangered the sovereignty, territorial integrity and peaceful development of Mauritius and other States". At a 1983 meeting in the General Assembly on the Ad Hoc Committee's report, the representatives of Mozambique and the Soviet Union described Diego Garcia as territory taken from Mauritius.

In its 2013 counter-memorial in the Mauritius v United Kingdom arbitration, the United Kingdom noted that Mauritius' statements in the General Assembly's general debate between 1982 and 1998 had referred to the archipelago with particular reference to military bases and the Assembly's Indian Ocean zone of peace resolutions. It argued that such speeches "were consistent with present United Kingdom sovereignty". In the 2018 advisory proceedings, it cited Ramgoolam's 1974 speech as evidence that he had regarded the detachment as agreed, noting that the speech made "no claim to Mauritian sovereignty over the Archipelago".

=== American assessment, 1975 ===
In October 1975 the State Department's Bureau of Politico-Military Affairs examined whether Aldabra, Farquhar and Desroches should be returned to Seychelles on its independence. It noted that the zone of peace proposal, "sparked by Sri Lanka", had "gained considerable support among the littoral countries". The paper stated that the United States had opposed the concept, which embodied the principle that littoral states could regulate the use of an international body of water, and that the basic concept of the British Indian Ocean Territory was contrary to the zone of peace programme. It observed that, publicly at least, the Mauritian Prime Minister sided with India and other littoral countries in opposing the development of military facilities on Diego Garcia. The paper weighed the option of opposing the islands' return. It concluded that keeping them would show the intention "to maintain our Indian Ocean presence and to reject the Zone of Peace concept". It judged that such a stance would probably provoke "resignation and antagonism in equal degree among the littoral countries". The three islands were returned to Seychelles on its independence on 29 June 1976.

== See also ==
- United Nations General Assembly Resolution 2066 (XX)
- Naval Support Facility Diego Garcia
- Expulsion of the Chagossians
- Chagos Archipelago sovereignty dispute

== Sources ==
United Nations documents

- Ad Hoc Committee on the Indian Ocean (6 July 2023). Report of the Ad Hoc Committee on the Indian Ocean (A/78/29) (Report). General Assembly Official Records, Seventy-eighth Session, Supplement No. 29. United Nations.
- United Nations General Assembly, First Committee (14 December 1971). Declaration of the Indian Ocean as a zone of peace: Report of the First Committee (A/8584) (Report). United Nations.
- United Nations General Assembly (16 December 1971). Official Records, Twenty-sixth session, 2022nd plenary meeting, 16 December 1971 (A/PV.2022) (Report). United Nations.
- United Nations General Assembly (16 December 1971). Resolution 2832 (XXVI). Declaration of the Indian Ocean as a zone of peace (Report). General Assembly Official Records, Twenty-sixth Session, Supplement No. 29 (A/8429). United Nations.
- United Nations General Assembly (15 December 1972). Resolution 2992 (XXVII). Declaration of the Indian Ocean as a zone of peace (Report). United Nations.
- United Nations General Assembly (1 December 2025). Resolution 80/13. Implementation of the Declaration of the Indian Ocean as a Zone of Peace (A/RES/80/13) (Report). United Nations.

Court decisions and pleadings

- Cançado Trindade, Antônio Augusto (25 February 2019). Separate Opinion of Judge Cançado Trindade (PDF). International Court of Justice.
- Legal Consequences of the Separation of the Chagos Archipelago from Mauritius in 1965, Advisory Opinion (PDF). I.C.J. Reports 2019. International Court of Justice. 25 February 2019.
- Written Statement of the Republic of Mauritius (PDF). Vol. I. International Court of Justice. 1 March 2018.
- Reference to Chagos Archipelago in Annual Statements made by Mauritius to the United Nations General Assembly (PDF). Written Statement of the Republic of Mauritius, Annex 100. International Court of Justice. 1 March 2018.
- Counter-Memorial of the United Kingdom. Permanent Court of Arbitration. 15 July 2013.
- Written Comments of the United Kingdom (PDF). International Court of Justice. 15 May 2018.
- Memorial of the Republic of Mauritius. Vol. I. Permanent Court of Arbitration. 1 August 2012.
- Written Statement of the United Kingdom (PDF). International Court of Justice. 15 February 2018.

Other documents

- NAM Summit Declaration, New Delhi, 7–12 March 1983 (extract) (PDF). Non-Aligned Movement. March 1983 – via Written Statement of Mauritius, Annex 21.
- Resolution on the Diego Garcia, AHG/Res. 99 (XVII) (PDF). Organisation of African Unity, Assembly of Heads of State and Government. July 1980 – via Written Statement of Mauritius, Annex 118.
- Disposition of the Seychelles Islands of the BIOT (PDF). Office of International Security Operations, Bureau of Politico-Military Affairs, United States Department of State. 31 October 1975 – via Memorial of Mauritius, Annex 74.
