= Chagos Marine Protected Area Arbitration (Mauritius v. United Kingdom) =

2010–2015 UNCLOS arbitration between Mauritius and the UK

- Court: Arbitral tribunal constituted under Annex VII of the United Nations Convention on the Law of the Sea, with the Permanent Court of Arbitration as registry
- Full case name: In the Matter of the Chagos Marine Protected Area Arbitration before an Arbitral Tribunal constituted under Annex VII of the United Nations Convention on the Law of the Sea between the Republic of Mauritius and the United Kingdom of Great Britain and Northern Ireland
- Started: 20 December 2010
- Decided: 18 March 2015
- Citation: PCA Case No. 2011-03; (2015) XXXI Reports of International Arbitral Awards 359

Case history
- Subsequent actions: Considered in the ICJ advisory opinion (2019) and by the ITLOS Special Chamber in the Mauritius–Maldives maritime boundary case (2021)
- Related actions: R (Bancoult) v Secretary of State for Foreign and Commonwealth Affairs (No 3) (English courts, 2013–2018)

Holding
- By three votes to two, the tribunal lacked jurisdiction over Mauritius' "coastal State" claims, which concerned sovereignty over the archipelago. Unanimously, the United Kingdom's 1965 undertakings on fishing rights in the territorial sea, the return of the archipelago and the benefit of minerals and oil were legally binding, and in establishing the marine protected area the United Kingdom breached Articles 2(3), 56(2) and 194(4) of UNCLOS.

Court membership
- Judges sitting: Ivan Shearer (President); Sir Christopher Greenwood; Albert Hoffmann; James Kateka; Rüdiger Wolfrum

Case opinions
- Decision by: Shearer, Greenwood and Hoffmann (majority) on Mauritius' First and Second Submissions; unanimous on the Third and Fourth Submissions and on the merits
- Concur/dissent: Kateka and Wolfrum (joint dissenting and concurring opinion)

Laws applied
- United Nations Convention on the Law of the Sea, arts. 2(3), 56(2), 194, 283, 288(1), 297 and 300

Keywords
- Coastal State; Estoppel; Due regard; Marine protected area; Chagos Archipelago sovereignty dispute

Mauritius v United Kingdom, formally the Chagos Marine Protected Area Arbitration (PCA Case No. 2011-03), was an arbitration between Mauritius and the United Kingdom under Annex VII of the United Nations Convention on the Law of the Sea (UNCLOS). It concerned the marine protected area (MPA) that the United Kingdom declared on 1 April 2010 around the Chagos Archipelago, which it administers as the British Indian Ocean Territory (BIOT) and over which Mauritius claims sovereignty. The Permanent Court of Arbitration (PCA) acted as registry, and the five-member tribunal was presided over by Ivan Shearer.

Mauritius argued that the United Kingdom was not the "coastal State" entitled to declare the MPA, that undertakings given by the United Kingdom when the archipelago was detached from Mauritius in 1965 had given Mauritius rights as a coastal state, and that the MPA breached the convention. In its award of 18 March 2015 the tribunal held, by three votes to two, that it had no jurisdiction over the first two claims, which it treated as part of the parties' dispute over sovereignty. It held unanimously that the United Kingdom's undertakings to return the archipelago when it was no longer needed for defence purposes, to preserve for Mauritius the benefit of any minerals or oil, and to keep fishing rights in the territorial sea available to Mauritius as far as practicable were legally binding. It unanimously declared that in establishing the MPA the United Kingdom had breached Articles 2(3), 56(2) and 194(4) of the convention, because it had not properly consulted Mauritius or balanced Mauritius' rights against its own. It found nothing in the internal British correspondence before it to suggest an improper purpose.

In a joint dissenting and concurring opinion, Judges James Kateka and Rüdiger Wolfrum would have taken jurisdiction over the sovereignty-related claims, and wrote that the detachment of the archipelago in 1965 showed "a complete disregard for the territorial integrity of Mauritius". The Mauritian prime minister called the award a historic ruling, while the British government said that there was no question about its sovereignty over the territory. The two governments held talks on the MPA in 2015 and 2016 without reaching agreement. The award was later considered by the International Court of Justice (ICJ) in its 2019 advisory opinion and by a special chamber of the International Tribunal for the Law of the Sea (ITLOS) in 2021.

== Background ==
=== Detachment and the Lancaster House undertakings ===
From 1814 until 8 November 1965 the United Kingdom administered the Chagos Archipelago as a dependency of its colony of Mauritius. In 1964 and 1965 the United Kingdom and the United States planned a defence facility in the archipelago, for which the United Kingdom was to detach the islands and place them under direct British administration. When the proposal was put to them in July 1965, Mauritian ministers said that detachment would be "unacceptable to public opinion in Mauritius" and proposed a lease instead. At a meeting at Lancaster House on 23 September 1965, during the Mauritius constitutional conference in London, the Premier, Seewoosagur Ramgoolam, and two other ministers agreed in principle to detachment in return for undertakings that the Colonial Secretary, Anthony Greenwood, would recommend to the British cabinet. (Note: Counsel for Mauritius told the tribunal that Anthony Greenwood was not related to Sir Christopher Greenwood, one of the arbitrators.)

Paragraph 22 of the record of the meeting, which the tribunal called the "Lancaster House Undertakings", included compensation of up to £3 million; the use of British good offices with the United States to ensure that certain facilities, including fishing rights, "would remain available to the Mauritius Government as far as practicable"; the return of the islands to Mauritius "if the need for the facilities on the islands disappeared"; and the reversion to Mauritius of the benefit of any minerals or oil "discovered in or near the Chagos Archipelago". The Mauritius Council of Ministers confirmed its agreement to detachment on 5 November 1965, with the ministers of the Parti Mauricien Social Démocrate dissenting. The BIOT was established by Order in Council on 8 November 1965.

The British records released in later decades show that ministers had resolved to detach the islands, if necessary without Mauritian consent, and that the Prime Minister, Harold Wilson, told Ramgoolam on the morning of 23 September that he could return home "either with Independence or without it". Mauritius has argued that its ministers therefore had no real choice; the United Kingdom has argued that their consent was freely negotiated, given after independence had been announced, and confirmed by Mauritius for years after independence. In 2019 the International Court of Justice concluded that the detachment "was not based on the free and genuine expression of the will of the people concerned" and that the decolonisation of Mauritius had not been lawfully completed.

Mauritius became independent on 12 March 1968, and between 1968 and 1973 the United Kingdom removed the Chagossian population from the archipelago. Mauritius has asserted sovereignty over the archipelago since at least 1980, and included it in the definition of Mauritius in its 1992 constitution. In the arbitration the parties disagreed about "the extent to which Mauritian consent to the detachment was given voluntarily".

=== The marine protected area ===
On 9 February 2009 the London newspaper The Independent reported that a giant marine park was planned for the archipelago. The tribunal later found that Mauritius had first learned of the proposal from that report rather than from the United Kingdom. The proposal was discussed at the second round of bilateral talks, held under a "sovereignty umbrella" in Port Louis on 21 July 2009, where the Mauritian side welcomed the proposal for environmental protection "in principle" and agreed that officials and scientists of both sides would examine it. On 10 November 2009 the United Kingdom launched a public consultation, which ran until 5 March 2010. Mauritius objected to the consultation taking place outside the bilateral talks. The prime ministers of the two countries, Navinchandra Ramgoolam and Gordon Brown, discussed the MPA at the Commonwealth Heads of Government Meeting on 27 November 2009, but gave conflicting accounts of the conversation. According to Ramgoolam, Brown said that he would put the project on hold; the United Kingdom's position was that Brown "did not say what the Mauritian Prime Minister understood him to have said".

On 30 March 2010 British officials advised the Foreign Secretary, David Miliband, to say that an MPA was the way ahead but to stop short of declaring one, and the British High Commissioner in Port Louis warned that declaring it immediately "could have very significant negative consequences for the bilateral relationship". On 31 March Miliband decided to have the full MPA declared, and on 1 April 2010 the BIOT Commissioner issued Proclamation No. 1 of 2010 establishing it. The MPA extended 200 nautical miles from the archipelago's baselines and covered more than half a million square kilometres. (Note: The award gives the area as more than half a million square kilometres. The Foreign Office's press release of 1 April 2010 described it as "some quarter of a million square miles", and Mauritius put it at "over 640,000 square kilometres".) When Miliband telephoned him that day, Ramgoolam asked whether the announcement could be delayed until after the Mauritian elections, and was told that it could not. On 2 April Mauritius protested that it "strongly objects" to the MPA and said that it would not recognise it. The United Kingdom later explained the timing by the general election called on 6 April 2010, telling the tribunal that "when an election is called, essentially government stops".

== Proceedings ==
=== Institution and constitution of the tribunal ===
Mauritius began the proceedings by a notification and statement of claim dated 20 December 2010, under Article 287 and Annex VII of UNCLOS. Mauritius had made no declaration choosing a forum for UNCLOS disputes, while the United Kingdom had chosen the ICJ in a declaration of 12 January 1998; Mauritius therefore relied on Article 287(5), under which such a dispute goes to Annex VII arbitration. It asked the tribunal to declare that the MPA was "not compatible with the 1982 Convention, and is without legal effect", that the United Kingdom was not a coastal state competent to establish it, and that only Mauritius could declare an exclusive economic zone in which a marine protected area might be declared.

Mauritius appointed Judge Rüdiger Wolfrum, a German national, in its notification, and the United Kingdom appointed Judge Sir Christopher Greenwood, a British national, on 19 January 2011. Greenwood had been elected to the ICJ in February 2009. As the parties could not agree on the other three members, Mauritius asked the President of ITLOS on 21 February 2011 to appoint them. On 25 March 2011 he appointed Judge James Kateka of Tanzania, Judge Albert Hoffmann of South Africa and Professor Ivan Shearer of Australia, with Shearer as President of the tribunal. Kateka and Hoffmann were then judges of ITLOS, and Shearer, an emeritus professor at the University of Sydney, had sat as a judge ad hoc in two ITLOS cases. On 31 March 2011 the President of the tribunal asked the PCA to act as registry, which it agreed to do the same day, and both parties confirmed that they had no objection.

=== Challenge to Judge Greenwood ===
On 19 May 2011 Mauritius asked Greenwood for further disclosure, citing the "long-standing" and "close working" character of his relationship with the British government. Greenwood replied that he had never done legal work for the United Kingdom concerning the Chagos Islands, and that he would "approach the issues in this arbitration with complete impartiality". On 23 May 2011 Mauritius announced a challenge, on the grounds that Greenwood had acted for the United Kingdom within the previous three years and that the relationship had continued, because after his appointment he had sat on the board that selected the new Legal Adviser to the Foreign and Commonwealth Office (FCO). Mauritius did not allege actual bias, but relied on the "appearance of bias". The United Kingdom argued that the tribunal should look primarily to the rules and practice of courts and tribunals in inter-state cases, and filed an opinion by a former President of the ICJ, Gilbert Guillaume, that past "close relations" with a party did not of themselves disqualify a judge.

Under a procedure agreed by the parties, the challenge was decided by the four other members of the tribunal, who heard argument at the Peace Palace in The Hague on 4 October 2011. They dismissed the challenge without reasons on 13 October 2011 and gave a reasoned decision on 30 November 2011. They held that the applicable law was Annex VII supplemented by "the law and practice of international courts and tribunals in inter-State cases", and that the International Bar Association guidelines on conflicts of interest relied on by Mauritius were not relevant. A challenging party therefore had to prove "justifiable grounds for doubting the independence and impartiality" of the arbitrator. Relying on the practice of the ICJ and on Guillaume's opinion, they were not persuaded that Greenwood's earlier work as counsel for the United Kingdom gave rise to such doubts.

On the appointments board, a former President of the ICJ, Rosalyn Higgins, who had played the same role in 2005, and a former President of ITLOS, Thomas Mensah, gave conflicting statements; the four members treated both as opinions rather than evidence of the practice of either court. They noted that Greenwood's role had been advisory, involved no legal advice and lasted two days, and concluded that it "neither constituted nor continued an already existing relationship". They added that the challenge had been "not without object and purpose", and trusted that the proceedings would "clear the air". The costs of the challenge were left for a later decision.

=== Written and oral proceedings ===
The tribunal adopted its rules of procedure on 29 March 2012, and Mauritius filed its memorial on 1 August 2012. On 31 October 2012 the United Kingdom filed preliminary objections to jurisdiction and asked for them to be heard in a separate preliminary phase. After a hearing in Dubai on 11 January 2013, the tribunal rejected that request in Procedural Order No. 2 of 15 January 2013, deciding that the objections "will be considered with the proceedings on the merits". The Foreign Office said that it was "disappointed" but that the order was "only a procedural decision". The United Kingdom filed its counter-memorial on 15 July 2013, Mauritius its reply on 18 November 2013, and the United Kingdom its rejoinder on 17 March 2014.

Some documents annexed to Mauritius' reply had been disclosed by the United Kingdom in separate proceedings in the English courts, and contained redactions. The United Kingdom maintained some of the redactions "principally on the grounds of legal professional privilege, relationships with third countries and national security". At the tribunal's request, its President examined the unredacted documents at an ex parte meeting at the British Consulate-General in Istanbul on 21 April 2014, and the tribunal then confirmed that each redaction was justified.

The hearing on jurisdiction and the merits was held from 22 April to 9 May 2014 at the Pera Palace Hotel in Istanbul. Mauritius was represented by its Solicitor-General, Dheerendra Kumar Dabee, as agent, with counsel including James Crawford, Philippe Sands and Paul Reichler. The United Kingdom's agent was Christopher Whomersley of the FCO, who was replaced by Alice Lacourt in June 2014, and its counsel included the Attorney General, Dominic Grieve, Alan Boyle, Sir Michael Wood and Samuel Wordsworth.

== Claims and objections ==
=== Mauritius' case ===
Mauritius described its case as having two parts: that the United Kingdom "does not have sovereignty over the Chagos Archipelago, is not 'the coastal State' for the purposes of the Convention", and that, independently of sovereignty, the MPA was "fundamentally incompatible with the rights and obligations provided for by the Convention". Its final submissions asked the tribunal to declare that:

1. the United Kingdom was not entitled to declare an MPA or other maritime zones "because it is not the 'coastal State'" within the meaning of the convention;
2. having regard to its commitments to Mauritius, the United Kingdom was not entitled unilaterally to declare an MPA "because Mauritius has rights as a 'coastal State'";
3. the United Kingdom should take no steps that might prevent the Commission on the Limits of the Continental Shelf (CLCS) from making recommendations on any full submission by Mauritius regarding the archipelago; and
4. the MPA was "incompatible with the substantive and procedural obligations of the United Kingdom under the Convention", including Articles 2, 55, 56, 63, 64, 194 and 300, and Article 7 of the 1995 Fish Stocks Agreement.

Mauritius also argued that the MPA was an abuse of rights under Article 300, alleging in its memorial that the United Kingdom saw the MPA as achieving "continued control of the Chagos Archipelago and the permanent banishment of the Mauritian citizens who were former residents of the Archipelago".

=== The United Kingdom's case ===
The United Kingdom objected to the tribunal's jurisdiction over all four submissions. It called the attempt to bring the sovereignty dispute within UNCLOS "artificial and baseless", arguing that courts and tribunals acting under Part XV of the convention have no jurisdiction over questions of sovereignty over land territory. It also argued that the MPA was a fisheries measure excluded from compulsory jurisdiction by Article 297(3)(a), and that Mauritius had not exchanged views on the dispute before beginning the arbitration, as Article 283 requires. On the merits it maintained that it had acquired sovereignty over the archipelago in 1814 and was "unquestionably the coastal State". It described the 1965 undertakings as "important political commitments" that were not legally binding under British law, and read the reference to fishing rights as meaning "preferential fishing rights if granted". It also maintained that its exchanges with Mauritius and the public consultation had met any obligation to consult, and denied any improper purpose.

== Award ==
The award is dated 18 March 2015, and the PCA announced it on 19 March 2015.

=== Sovereignty and the "coastal State" (First and Second Submissions) ===
The majority, made up of Shearer, Greenwood and Hoffmann, noted that UNCLOS gives no guidance on identifying the "coastal State" where sovereignty over the coast is disputed. It held that it was for the tribunal to determine the real dispute between the parties on an objective basis. It found that a dispute over sovereignty existed, Mauritius having asserted its sovereignty "since at least 1980", and that a separate dispute existed about the way the MPA was declared and its implications for the Lancaster House undertakings. Asking where "the relative weight of the dispute lies", it quoted counsel for Mauritius' prediction that if the tribunal ruled for Mauritius "the British will leave". These, it said, were "not the sort of consequences that follow from a narrow dispute regarding the interpretation of the words 'coastal State'". It concluded that the first submission was "properly characterized as relating to land sovereignty over the Chagos Archipelago".

The majority held that a dispute over land sovereignty was not a dispute "concerning the interpretation or application" of the convention within Article 288(1). It reasoned that states which had insisted on being able to exclude maritime boundary disputes from compulsory settlement, under Article 298(1)(a)(i), could not reasonably be expected to have accepted that "more fundamental issues of territorial sovereignty" could be raised as separate claims; had the drafters intended this, they would have provided a similar opt-out. To read the term "coastal State" as a warrant to decide such matters "would do violence to the intent of the drafters". It accepted that a tribunal may make "ancillary determinations of law" needed to resolve a dispute under the convention, but held that where the real issue does not concern the convention, "an incidental connection between the dispute and some matter regulated by the Convention is insufficient". It did not "categorically exclude" that a minor issue of territorial sovereignty might be ancillary to such a dispute, but held that this case was not one.

The majority accepted that the second submission raised a distinct issue, but held that a finding that Mauritius had rights as "a coastal State" "would effectively constitute a finding that the United Kingdom is less than fully sovereign over the Chagos Archipelago". It found that the true object of the submission was "to bolster Mauritius' claim to sovereignty", so that it concerned the same dispute over sovereignty and was also outside the tribunal's jurisdiction.

=== Continental shelf (Third Submission) ===
Mauritius added its third submission after the United Kingdom stated in its rejoinder that Mauritius, not being the coastal state, "has no standing before the CLCS with respect to BIOT". The tribunal noted that at the bilateral talks in 2009 the United Kingdom had offered to cooperate on a submission to the CLCS under a sovereignty umbrella, that Mauritius had accepted that approach, and that the offer remained open. It found unanimously that there was no dispute on the point, and that it was not required to rule on its jurisdiction over the submission or on its merits.

=== Jurisdiction over the MPA (Fourth Submission) ===
The tribunal held unanimously that it had jurisdiction over the fourth submission. It rejected the argument that the MPA was solely a fisheries measure: having justified the MPA on broad environmental grounds, including the protection of coral, the United Kingdom could not now "limit the jurisdiction of this Tribunal with the argument that the MPA is merely a fisheries measure". It accepted that Mauritius' fishing rights in the exclusive economic zone fell within the fisheries exception in Article 297(3)(a), but held that the undertaking to return the archipelago gave Mauritius "an interest in significant decisions that bear upon the possible future uses of the Archipelago", including the condition in which it would be returned. It found that its jurisdiction rested on Article 288(1) and also on Article 297(1)(c), which in its view covered procedural obligations to consult other states and to have regard to their rights. Its jurisdiction extended to Article 2(3), as regards fishing rights in the territorial sea and the undertakings on return and on minerals and oil; to Article 56(2), as regards the undertakings on return and on minerals and oil; to Article 194; and to Article 300 insofar as linked to a breach of those articles. It had no jurisdiction over the claims under Articles 63 and 64 and the Fish Stocks Agreement in the exclusive economic zone.

The tribunal also rejected the objection based on Article 283. It held that the article requires the parties to exchange views on the means of settling a dispute but "does not require the Parties to in fact engage in negotiations", and that it is meant to ensure that a state "would not be taken entirely by surprise" by compulsory proceedings, without undue formalism. It found that a dispute about the MPA had arisen at the latest with a Mauritian note verbale of 23 November 2009, and that the parties' views on settling it by negotiation "were clearly exchanged in December 2009".

=== The Lancaster House undertakings ===
On the merits, the tribunal said that it could interpret the 1965 agreement "to the extent necessary to establish the nature and scope of the United Kingdom's undertakings". Mauritius' primary position was that no valid agreement had been reached in 1965, among other reasons because the link between detachment and independence had put the Council of Ministers under duress; it argued that the undertakings were nevertheless binding because the United Kingdom had kept the archipelago on independence and had repeatedly renewed them. The tribunal found that the undertakings "formed part of the quid pro quo through which Mauritian agreement to the detachment of the Chagos Archipelago from Mauritius was procured", and that without them neither Ramgoolam nor the Council of Ministers would have agreed to detachment. It saw "no hint" that the United Kingdom had intended anything less than a firm commitment.

The tribunal accepted the United Kingdom's submission that, as a matter of British constitutional law, an agreement between the British government and a colony could not be governed by international law. It held, however, that Mauritian independence in 1968 "had the effect of elevating the package deal reached with the Mauritian Ministers to the international plane", so that the 1965 agreement "became a matter of international law between the Parties". The United Kingdom had repeated the undertakings many times since independence, including after Mauritius began to assert sovereignty, and Mauritius had relied on them. The tribunal therefore held that the United Kingdom was "estopped from denying the binding effect" of its undertakings to return the archipelago when it was no longer needed for defence purposes, to preserve for Mauritius the benefit of any minerals or oil, and to ensure that fishing rights remained available to Mauritius as far as practicable.

The fishing undertaking was not, in the tribunal's view, a "perpetual and absolute right" to fish, but a positive obligation subject to the defence needs of the United States and to the United Kingdom's discretion in managing the fishery. The United Kingdom had complied with it for decades by allowing Mauritian vessels to fish, under licences issued free of charge, in the territorial sea and in the wider fishing zones as they were extended. The tribunal considered fishing rights only in the territorial sea, as claims concerning the exclusive economic zone fell outside its jurisdiction. Having reached that conclusion, it did not decide whether Mauritius also had traditional fishing rights.

=== Breach of the convention ===
After comparing the authentic language versions of the convention, the tribunal held that Article 2(3), under which sovereignty over the territorial sea "is exercised subject to this Convention and to other rules of international law", imposes an obligation. It did not regard the Lancaster House undertakings as among the "general rules of international law" to which the article refers, but held that general international law required the United Kingdom "to act in good faith in its relations with Mauritius, including with respect to undertakings". Under Article 56(2) a coastal state must have "due regard" to the rights of other states in its exclusive economic zone. The tribunal read this as requiring "such regard for the rights of Mauritius as is called for by the circumstances and by the nature of those rights", which would in most cases involve "at least some consultation". It treated the two obligations as "for all intents and purposes, equivalent".

The tribunal found that Mauritius' fishing rights in the territorial sea had "effectively been extinguished" by the MPA, which would also affect the state of the archipelago when it was returned. Reviewing the events of 2009 and 2010, it noted that the meeting of 21 July 2009 "comprised the entirety of bilateral consultation", whereas the United Kingdom had consulted the United States promptly and had taken account of American concerns about military activities and the base on Diego Garcia. It treated the consultations with the United States as "a practical example of due regard and a yardstick" for those with Mauritius, and likened the July 2009 meeting with Mauritius to "ships passing in the night". As late as March 2010 the United Kingdom had assured Mauritius that "no decision on the creation of an MPA has yet been taken", only to announce the MPA days later. The tribunal found no "convincing explanation" for the haste, and did not accept that the electoral timetable could justify disregarding the United Kingdom's obligations to Mauritius.

The tribunal held that the obligations of good faith and due regard required "at least, both consultation and a balancing exercise", and that the United Kingdom had met neither requirement. It had given Mauritius little information, frustrated Mauritius' reasonable expectation of further talks, proceeded on the "flawed basis" that Mauritius had no fishing rights in the territorial sea, and assumed, "without ever confirming with Mauritius", that the MPA was in Mauritius' interest. The tribunal therefore found that the United Kingdom had breached Articles 2(3) and 56(2), and that the proclamation of the MPA "was incompatible with the Convention".

Article 194 deals with pollution of the marine environment, but the tribunal held that it also covers conservation measures such as the MPA, because Article 194(5) refers to the protection of "rare or fragile ecosystems". It found no breach of Article 194(1), which requires states only to "endeavour to harmonize" their policies and sets no deadline. Article 194(4), which requires states to "refrain from unjustifiable interference" with other states' activities, applied to Mauritian fishing in the territorial sea. Environmental considerations might justify such interference, but only after "significant engagement" with Mauritius to explain the need for the measure and to explore less restrictive alternatives, and such engagement was "nowhere evident in the record"; the MPA was therefore incompatible with Article 194(4) as well.

Mauritius' claim of abuse of rights relied mainly on a leaked US embassy cable about a meeting on 12 May 2009, which recorded the BIOT Commissioner, Colin Roberts, as saying that a marine park would "put paid to resettlement claims of the archipelago's former residents". The United Kingdom pointed out that Roberts had denied on oath in the English courts that he had said those words, and that the High Court had accepted his evidence. The tribunal saw "no basis to question the conclusion reached" in the English proceedings that the meeting had not gone as the cable recorded, and declined to place weight on "a record of such provenance". It found that none of the internal British correspondence before it suggested "an ulterior motive or improper purpose", and, having found other breaches, saw no need to rule on Article 300.

=== Final observations and costs ===
The tribunal stressed that it had "taken no view on the substantive quality or nature of the MPA or on the importance of environmental protection", and that its concern had been "with the manner in which the MPA was established, rather than its substance". It was now open to the parties to negotiate, "with a view to achieving a mutually satisfactory arrangement for protecting the marine environment", under a "sovereignty umbrella". Having noted the United Kingdom's request for costs and the deferred question of the costs of the challenge to Greenwood, the tribunal observed that Mauritius had "succeeded in significant part" and that both parties had argued the case "with skill, dispatch, and economy". It dismissed the United Kingdom's application for costs and ordered each party to bear its own costs, with the costs of the tribunal shared equally.

=== Operative part ===
The operative part of the award was as follows:

Paragraph	Finding	Vote
A(1)	No jurisdiction over Mauritius' First and Second Submissions	3–2
A(2)	No dispute between the parties such as would call for the exercise of jurisdiction over the Third Submission	Unanimous
A(3)	Jurisdiction under Articles 288(1) and 297(1)(c) over the Fourth Submission, as regards Articles 2(3), 56(2), 194 and 300 (to the extent stated)	Unanimous
A(4)	The United Kingdom's objection to jurisdiction over the Fourth Submission, to that extent, dismissed	Unanimous
B	Declaration that in establishing the MPA the United Kingdom breached Articles 2(3), 56(2) and 194(4)	Unanimous
C	Each party to bear its own costs; costs of the tribunal shared equally	No vote stated

Paragraph B reads:

In relation to the merits of the Parties' dispute, the Tribunal, having found, inter alia, (1) that the United Kingdom's undertaking to ensure that fishing rights in the Chagos Archipelago would remain available to Mauritius as far as practicable is legally binding insofar as it relates to the territorial sea; (2) that the United Kingdom's undertaking to return the Chagos Archipelago to Mauritius when no longer needed for defence purposes is legally binding; and (3) that the United Kingdom's undertaking to preserve the benefit of any minerals or oil discovered in or near the Chagos Archipelago for Mauritius is legally binding; DECLARES, unanimously, that in establishing the MPA surrounding the Chagos Archipelago the United Kingdom breached its obligations under Articles 2(3), 56(2), and 194(4) of the Convention.

== Dissenting and concurring opinion ==
Judges Kateka and Wolfrum wrote that they were "not able to agree with the reasoning and the findings of the Tribunal" on Mauritius' first and second submissions, but concurred with the findings on the third and fourth, "although not with all the relevant reasoning".

=== Jurisdiction ===
In their view the majority had not distinguished between the dispute and the arguments advanced in it. On the wording of the first submission it was "exactly the other way around" from the majority's characterisation: the identity of the coastal state was the dispute, and "the issue of sovereignty over the Chagos Archipelago is merely an element in the reasoning of Mauritius and not to be decided by the Tribunal". They described the second submission as "the opposite of a claim questioning the sovereignty of the United Kingdom", because it assumed British sovereignty and asked whether the United Kingdom had ceded some of its rights as a coastal state through the undertakings. Relying on the drafting history of Articles 297 and 298, they argued that the clause in Article 298(1)(a)(i) excluding mixed sovereignty disputes from conciliation could not be read into Article 288(1). They considered it "permissible to decide incidentally about sovereignty issues", and wrote that to introduce a new limitation on jurisdiction "would change the balance achieved at the Third UN Conference on the Law of the Sea".

=== Detachment and the undertakings ===
The two judges wrote that by declining jurisdiction the tribunal had "missed the opportunity to deal with the separation of the Chagos Islands from Mauritius and the circumstances surrounding this separation". They rejected the United Kingdom's argument that the principle of self-determination developed only in 1970, and wrote that General Assembly Resolution 1514 clearly stated that the detachment of part of a colony is contrary to international law. On consent, they agreed that Mauritius "had no choice", since detachment "was already decided whether Mauritius gave its consent or not". They wrote that the record of the conversation between Prime Minister Harold Wilson and Ramgoolam "suggests that the Wilson's threat that Ramgoolam could return home without independence amounts to duress", and that the colonial relationship produced "a clear situation of inequality between the two sides". They concluded that Mauritius' first submission was "well founded in fact and law on the merits".

On the second submission, they considered that the 1965 commitments had been meant to be binding and had become part of international law on independence. By establishing the MPA, the United Kingdom had therefore "violated its prior commitments vis-à-vis Mauritius and thus violated Article 56(2) of the Convention", with the consequence that "the MPA is legally invalid". They would also have read the undertakings "directly into Article 2(3)" of the convention.

=== Good faith ===
The two judges agreed that the MPA breached Articles 2(3), 56(2) and 194(4). They would also have considered Brown's assurance at the 2009 Commonwealth meeting that the MPA would be put on hold, which they called "a commitment which Mauritius relied upon to its detriment". They disagreed with the majority's decision not to examine good faith under Article 300, particularly as the tribunal's finding of estoppel rested on that principle. They did "not completely share" the majority's observation that the internal British documents suggested no ulterior motive, and wrote that the establishment of the MPA and the negotiations leading up to it "leave a lot to be desired on the part of the United Kingdom". Noting "disturbing similarities between the establishment of the BIOT in 1965 and the proclamation of the MPA in 2010", they wrote:

The 1965 excision of the Chagos Archipelago from Mauritius shows a complete disregard for the territorial integrity of Mauritius by the United Kingdom which was the colonial power. British and American defence interests were put above Mauritius' rights. Fast forward to 2010 and one finds a similar disregard of Mauritius' rights, such as the total ban on fishing in the MPA. These are not accidental happenings.

They concluded that the United Kingdom "did violate the standard of good faith".

Mauritius later relied on the opinion's statement about territorial integrity in an aide-mémoire to the United Nations General Assembly in 2017 and in its written statement to the ICJ in 2018. The United Kingdom answered that it was "meaningless" to present the minority's views as uncontradicted, because the majority "simply did not enter into the sovereignty issues".

== Reactions ==
=== Governments ===
The Prime Minister of Mauritius, Anerood Jugnauth, described the award as a historic ruling for Mauritius. Replying to a private notice question in the National Assembly, he said that the "victory is for Mauritius as a whole". He said that it was the first time that the United Kingdom's conduct concerning the archipelago had been "considered and condemned" by an international court or tribunal, and proposed a committee, including the opposition, to consider the way forward. A Mauritian government press release said that Mauritius had "real, firm and binding rights over the Chagos Archipelago", which the United Kingdom had to respect.

A spokesperson for the Foreign and Commonwealth Office said that the government was pleased that the tribunal had found no improper motive in the creation of the MPA, and that "there is no question about UK sovereignty in the British Indian Ocean Territory". The spokesperson added that the United Kingdom would work with Mauritius to see how its fishing ambitions could be reconciled with conservation in the territory. In a written answer to Lord Avebury on 26 March 2015, the Foreign Office minister Baroness Anelay said that "there is no question about the UK's sovereignty of BIOT" and that the government had always maintained that the MPA "is not a bar to resettlement". Answering a question from Patrick Grady in June 2015, the minister James Duddridge said that the tribunal had agreed with the government that it had no jurisdiction over sovereignty, and that the government wished "to implement the award in the spirit of greatest possible cooperation" and had proposed consultations with Mauritius on the protection of the marine environment.

=== Counsel and Chagossians ===
Philippe Sands, counsel for Mauritius, called the award a "historic and far-reaching" judgment. Sabrina Jean of the Chagos Refugees Group in the United Kingdom said that the islanders' focus remained the government's feasibility study on resettlement and their right of return. Gilberte Gendron, chair of the Chagossian Committee in Seychelles, said that the ruling had left Chagossians uncertain of their position, because it was "not a Chagossian case" but a claim by Mauritius to sovereignty, and asked what would become of the Chagossians' British citizenship if the islands were returned to Mauritius. The UK Chagos Support Association said that the ruling gave the British government an opportunity to support the Chagossians' return, arguing that the MPA "does not prevent Chagossians" from returning home.

=== Commentary ===
Michael Waibel, writing on the blog EJIL: Talk! in April 2015, considered that the tribunal's objective assessment of the undertakings and its use of estoppel "could have important implications for other sovereignty disputes in a decolonization context". He also thought that the award, together with the dissent, could help to build support for a negotiated settlement over the archipelago, including the return of the Chagossians. In the American Journal of International Law, David Colson and Brian Vohrer summarised the award as holding that the United Kingdom, by declaring the MPA unilaterally, had disregarded legitimate Mauritian interests and so breached the convention. Géraldine Giraudeau described the award as "substantially favourable to Mauritius", and argued that, although it did not decide sovereignty, its finding that the undertakings were legally binding had important consequences for the wider dispute. Endalew Lijalem Enyew, writing for the Norwegian Centre for the Law of the Sea, argued that the tribunal had "missed an important opportunity" to rule on Mauritius' claim to traditional fishing rights.

Stefan Talmon argued in the International and Comparative Law Quarterly that, although the award had mainly been noted for the majority's refusal to decide sovereignty, both the majority and the minority had contributed to the "creeping expansion of compulsory jurisdiction" of UNCLOS courts and tribunals. In his view the tribunal had read down the requirement to exchange views in Article 283, widened the meaning of "any dispute concerning the interpretation or application of this Convention", and narrowed the exceptions in Articles 297 and 298. He considered the minority's approach to jurisdiction even more expansive than the majority's. He also wrote that in 1982 few would have predicted that a tribunal under Part XV would find a colonial-era undertaking legally binding, and that the finding on the return of the archipelago might prove valuable to Mauritius when the UK–US agreement on the territory expired in 2036.

== Aftermath ==
=== Talks on the marine protected area ===
After the award, Jugnauth wrote to the British prime minister on 14 April and 14 May 2015 that Mauritius was ready to negotiate, on the understanding that the United Kingdom would fully respect Mauritius' rights under UNCLOS and international law. According to the United Kingdom, the two governments held three rounds of talks under a sovereignty umbrella, in November 2015, May 2016 and August 2016. In May 2016 Jugnauth told the National Assembly that little progress had been made because the two governments interpreted the award differently. He said that Mauritius regarded the MPA as "without legal effect under international law and cannot be enforced", a view that the United Kingdom did not share, and that the British interpretation of the award was "very narrow".

On 4 November 2016, after a request for an advisory opinion had been placed on the General Assembly's agenda in September 2016, Mauritius asked for the talks on implementing the award to be put on hold. The United Kingdom asked it to reconsider, and said in February 2018 that the talks had not resumed. In its written statement to the ICJ in March 2018, Mauritius said that it had "not been made aware of any measures taken by the U.K. to implement" the award. It also complained that it had not been consulted before the 1966 UK–US agreement on the defence use of the territory was extended for a further 20 years in December 2016.

=== UK courts ===
In a parallel judicial review in the English courts, Olivier Bancoult challenged the declaration of the MPA. The Divisional Court declined on 11 June 2013 to decide whether Mauritius had fishing rights under international law, saying that the UNCLOS arbitration "is the appropriate forum for the determination of such an issue". During the Supreme Court hearing in June 2017, the government put before the court a statement that it was "committed to implementing the Dispositif" of the award, and that "The Arbitral Award did not require the termination of the MPA". In its judgment of 8 February 2018 the Supreme Court dismissed Bancoult's appeal, noting that the effect in domestic law of the tribunal's finding on fishing rights was not before it.

=== International Court of Justice ===
The United Kingdom later argued that, "having failed before the Tribunal in 2015", Mauritius had taken the same issues to the General Assembly with a view to obtaining an advisory opinion. On 22 June 2017 the General Assembly asked the ICJ for an advisory opinion on the separation of the archipelago. Some participants argued that an opinion would reopen findings of the tribunal that were binding on Mauritius and the United Kingdom. The court held that res judicata did not prevent it from giving an opinion, and that the issues determined by the tribunal "are not the same as those that are before the Court in these proceedings". In its account of the facts it recorded the tribunal's finding that the sovereignty dispute did not concern the interpretation or application of UNCLOS, the breaches found, and the holding that the undertaking to return the archipelago was legally binding. (Note: The ICJ described the tribunal as having found that "it lacked jurisdiction on Mauritius' first, second and third submissions". The award held that it lacked jurisdiction over the first and second submissions, and that there was no dispute calling for it to exercise jurisdiction over the third.) In its opinion of 25 February 2019, the court concluded that the decolonisation of Mauritius "was not lawfully completed" in 1968, and that the United Kingdom was under an obligation to end its administration of the archipelago "as rapidly as possible".

=== ITLOS Special Chamber ===
In the maritime boundary case between Mauritius and the Maldives, the Maldives argued that the award had established, with res judicata effect between Mauritius and the United Kingdom, that the United Kingdom could exercise the rights of a coastal state over the archipelago until the sovereignty dispute was resolved. In its judgment on preliminary objections of 28 January 2021, the Special Chamber rejected that reading. It held that the tribunal had "made it clear that it lacked jurisdiction to determine who has sovereignty over the Chagos Archipelago", and that its findings on the fourth submission did not mean that it had recognised the United Kingdom as the coastal state. The chamber considered the award "of some relevance" to the legal status of the archipelago, and said that the tribunal's findings on Mauritius' rights under the undertakings "may play a role" in deciding whether Mauritius could be regarded as the coastal state for the purpose of delimitation. Summing up, it said that the archipelago "has been subject to a special regime, according to which Mauritius is entitled to certain maritime rights". It also held that the advisory opinion had not overruled the award, since the award contained no determination that the United Kingdom was entitled to act as the coastal state.

=== 2025 agreement ===
In the agreement signed by the two governments on 22 May 2025, the parties agreed that "Mauritius is sovereign over the Chagos Archipelago in its entirety, including Diego Garcia". Its preamble refers to "the decisions of international courts and tribunals, including the International Court of Justice, relating to the Chagos Archipelago". Under Article 5 the United Kingdom agrees to "provide support and assistance to Mauritius in the establishment and management of its Marine Protected Area in the Chagos Archipelago", on terms to be agreed in a separate instrument.

== See also ==
- Chagos Archipelago sovereignty dispute
- Chagos Marine Protected Area
- Detachment of the Chagos Archipelago
- Legal Consequences of the Separation of the Chagos Archipelago from Mauritius in 1965
- United Nations Convention on the Law of the Sea

== Sources ==
=== Award and procedural decisions ===
- In the Matter of the Chagos Marine Protected Area Arbitration (Mauritius v. United Kingdom): Award (PDF). Permanent Court of Arbitration. 18 March 2015.
- Kateka, James; Wolfrum, Rüdiger (18 March 2015). Dissenting and Concurring Opinion of Judge James Kateka and Judge Rüdiger Wolfrum. Permanent Court of Arbitration.
- Reasoned Decision on Challenge. Permanent Court of Arbitration. 30 November 2011.
- "Chagos Marine Protected Area Arbitration (Mauritius v. United Kingdom)". Permanent Court of Arbitration.
- "Hearing on Bifurcation of Proceedings Held in Dubai, U.A.E." (Press release). Permanent Court of Arbitration. 22 January 2013.
- "Hearing on Jurisdiction and the Merits Held in Istanbul, Turkey" (Press release). Permanent Court of Arbitration. 16 May 2014.
- "The Arbitral Tribunal Renders its Award" (Press release). Permanent Court of Arbitration. 19 March 2015.

=== Pleadings ===
- Notification under Article 287 and Annex VII, Article 1 of UNCLOS and the Statement of the Claim and Grounds on which it is Based. Permanent Court of Arbitration. 20 December 2010.
- Memorial of the Republic of Mauritius. Vol. I. Permanent Court of Arbitration. 1 August 2012.
- Counter-Memorial of the United Kingdom. Permanent Court of Arbitration. 15 July 2013.

=== Other sources ===
- Akande, Dapo (26 March 2011). "Arbitrators Appointed in the Mauritius v UK Case concerning the Chagos Islands". EJIL: Talk!.
- Amla, Hajira (26 March 2015). "Chagossians on shaky ground after Mauritius-UK tribunal ruling, says Seychelles association". Seychelles News Agency. Archived from the original on 5 July 2018.
- Anelay, Joyce (26 March 2015). "Chagossians: Resettlement (HL5935)". UK Parliament: Written questions, answers and statements.
- "Republic of Mauritius v. United Kingdom and Northern Ireland (Nov. 30, 2011)". International Law in Brief. American Society of International Law. 6 January 2012. Archived from the original on 17 January 2012.
- R (Bancoult No 3) v Secretary of State for Foreign and Commonwealth Affairs, UKSC 3 (Supreme Court 8 February 2018).
- R (Bancoult) v Secretary of State for Foreign and Commonwealth Affairs, EWHC (Admin) 1502 (High Court (Divisional Court) 11 June 2013).
- Bowcott, Owen; Jones, Sam (19 March 2015). "UN ruling raises hope of return for exiled Chagos islanders". The Guardian.
- Bowcott, Owen; Vidal, John (28 January 2013). "Britain faces UN tribunal over Chagos Islands marine reserve". The Guardian.
- Colson, David A.; Vohrer, Brian J. (October 2015). "In re Chagos Marine Protected Area (Mauritius v. United Kingdom)". American Journal of International Law. 109 (4): 845–851. doi:10.5305/amerjintelaw.109.4.0845.
- "Chagos and Tromelin: Mauritius adamant to recover excised territories". News on Sunday. Le Défi Media Group. 20 May 2016.
- Defence Facilities in the Indian Ocean: Memorandum by the Deputy Secretary of State for Defence and the Parliamentary Under-Secretary of State for Foreign Affairs, OPD(65)124 (PDF). Cabinet, Defence and Oversea Policy Committee. 26 August 1965 – via ICJ Annex 48.
- Duddridge, James (23 June 2015). "British Indian Ocean Territory: Marine Protected Areas (2407)". UK Parliament: Written questions, answers and statements.
- Enyew, Endalew Lijalem (4 June 2015). "The Chagos Marine Protected Area Arbitral Award and its Ruling on Fishing Rights". The NCLOS Blog. Norwegian Centre for the Law of the Sea, UiT The Arctic University of Norway.
- Giraudeau, Géraldine (2015). "A Slight Revenge and a Growing Hope for Mauritius and the Chagossians: The UNCLOS Arbitral Tribunal's Award of 18 March 2015 on Chagos Marine Protected Area (Mauritius v. United Kingdom)". Revista de Direito Internacional. 12 (2). doi:10.5102/rdi.v12i2.3878.
- Legal Consequences of the Separation of the Chagos Archipelago from Mauritius in 1965, Advisory Opinion (PDF). I.C.J. Reports 2019. International Court of Justice. 25 February 2019. p. 95.
- Dispute concerning delimitation of the maritime boundary between Mauritius and Maldives in the Indian Ocean (Mauritius/Maldives), Preliminary Objections, Judgment (PDF). ITLOS Reports 2020–2021. International Tribunal for the Law of the Sea. 28 January 2021. p. 17.
- Written Statement of the Republic of Mauritius (PDF). Vol. I. International Court of Justice. 1 March 2018.
- Record of a Conversation between the Prime Minister and the Premier of Mauritius, Sir Seewoosagur Ramgoolam, at No. 10, Downing Street, at 10 a.m. on Thursday, 23 September 1965 (PDF). 23 September 1965. TNA FO 371/184528 – via MM Annex 18.
- Talmon, Stefan (October 2016). "The Chagos Marine Protected Area Arbitration: Expansion of the Jurisdiction of UNCLOS Part XV Courts and Tribunals". International and Comparative Law Quarterly. 65 (4): 927–951. doi:10.1017/S0020589316000403.
- Agreement between the Government of the United Kingdom of Great Britain and Northern Ireland and the Government of the Republic of Mauritius concerning the Chagos Archipelago including Diego Garcia (CS Mauritius No.1/2025, CP 1334) (Report). Foreign, Commonwealth and Development Office. 22 May 2025.
- Written Statement of the United Kingdom (PDF). International Court of Justice. 15 February 2018.
- Waibel, Michael (17 April 2015). "Mauritius v. UK: Chagos Marine Protected Area Unlawful". EJIL: Talk!.
