= United Nations Security Council Resolution 249 =

UN Security Council Resolution 249
- Date: April 18 1968
- Meeting no.: 1414
- Code: S/RES/249 (Document)
- Subject: The Admission of new Members to the UN: Mauritius
- Voting summary: 15 voted for; None voted against; None abstained
- Result: Adopted

Security Council composition
- Permanent members: China; France; Soviet Union; United Kingdom; United States
- Non-permanent members: Algeria; Brazil; Canada; Denmark; Ethiopia; Hungary; India; Pakistan; Paraguay; Senegal

United Nations Security Council Resolution 249, adopted unanimously on April 18, 1968, after examining the application of Mauritius for membership in the United Nations, the Council recommended to the General Assembly that Mauritius be admitted.

== See also ==
- List of United Nations Security Council Resolutions 201 to 300 (1965–1971)
