= Nauru v Australia =

Legal case over resource extraction and environmental damage

- Court: International Court of Justice
- Full case name: Certain Phosphate Lands in Nauru (Nauru v Australia)
- Started: 1989

UN Security Council Resolution 600
- Date: 19 October 1987
- Meeting no.: 2,754
- Code: S/RES/600 (Document)
- Subject: On the conditions under which Nauru might become a party to the Statute of the International Court of Justice
- Result: Adopted

Security Council composition
- Permanent members: China; France; Soviet Union; United Kingdom; United States
- Non-permanent members: Argentina; Bulgaria; Congo; Ghana; Italy; Japan; United Arab Emirates; Venezuela; West Germany; Zambia

Certain Phosphate Lands in Nauru, commonly known as Nauru v Australia or the Phosphate Case, was an International Court of Justice case regarding damages for the exploitation of mineral reserves in the island nation of Nauru.

== Background ==
Prior to becoming independent in 1968, Nauru's phosphate resources were heavily exploited by Australia, New Zealand and the United Kingdom. Nauru alleged that mining caused substantial environmental harm to the island. The environmental damage was so severe that, for a time, Australia was planning the resettlement of the island's inhabitants once it became uninhabitable. Nauru also alleged the British Phosphate Commissioners who had controlled the extraction and trade had deprived Nauru of financial benefit by keeping prices paid for the resource artificially low.

== Litigation ==
At the time, Nauru was not a United Nations member, meaning it did not automatically have access to the International Court of Justice (ICJ). Nauru lobbied the UN, and in 1987, after Nauru accepted the jurisdiction of the ICJ, jurisdiction was recognized by United Nations Security Council Resolution 600. The resolution, adopted unanimously on 19 October 1987, recommended to the General Assembly that Nauru be allowed to become a party to the Statute of the International Court of Justice if it met the following conditions:

(a) acceptance of the provision of the Statute of the ICJ;
(b) acceptance of all the obligations of a Member of the United Nations under Article 94 of the Charter and
(c) undertaking to contribute to the expenses of the Court as the General Assembly shall assess from time to time, after consultation with the Government of the Republic of Nauru.

Nauru brought its case in 1989, claiming damages for what it alleged to be Australia's breach of its obligations in respect of Nauru's rights of self-determination and sovereignty over its natural wealth and resources.

At a preliminary stage of proceedings, Australia raised a number of objections, which were largely rejected. Its claim to have not received timely notice of the case was rejected as Nauru had discussed the matter in speeches and meetings. Allegations that the liability of the United Kingdom and New Zealand had to be determined prior to a judgment on Australia's liability were rejected. However, Nauru's claim to certain assets that had been held in trust but later vested in Australia was dismissed as it had not been raised in a timely manner. Because some of Nauru's claims were successful at the preliminary stage, the case was allowed to continue.

After the opinion on preliminary matters was handed down, Nauru and Australia negotiated a settlement. Reportedly there was a payment of $107 million Australian Dollars, along with a commitment to spend AUD$2.5m each year on environmental remediation. New Zealand and the United Kingdom contributed to Australia's settlement.

== Legacy and impact ==
The litigation has been cited as an example of how the ICJ can assist nations in establishing state obligations.
