= Stefan Talmon =

German jurist

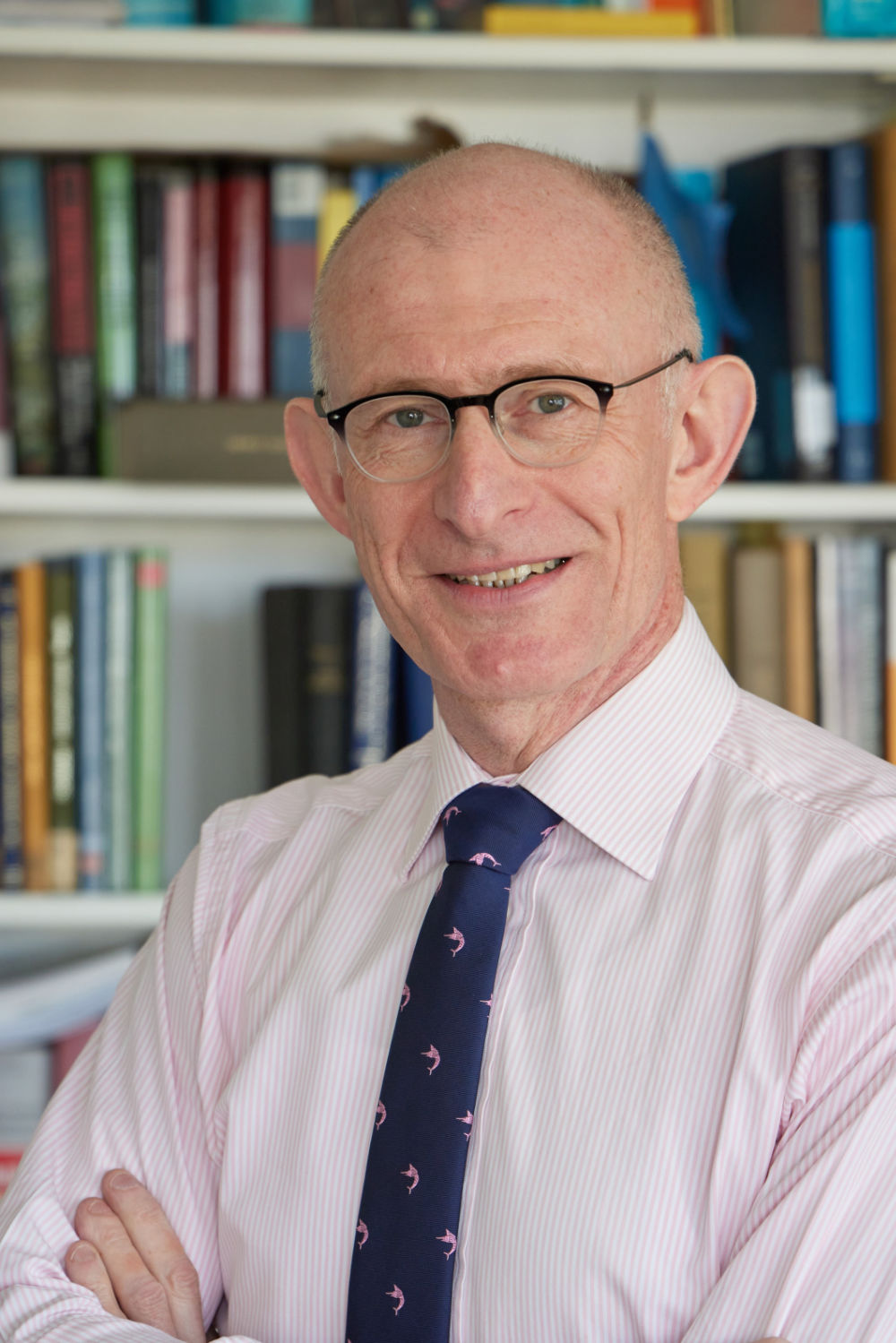
Stefan Talmon (2022)

Stefan Talmon (born 1965) is a professor of international law at the University of Bonn and a supernumerary fellow of St. Anne's College, Oxford.

== Life ==
Talmon attended Neuenbürg Grammar School. After compulsory military service (lieutenant), he studied law at the University of Tübingen and LMU Munich. In 1989, he received a Master of Law degree from the University of Cambridge where he studied at Wolfson College. From 1991 to 1995, he was a doctoral student at St. Antony's College, Oxford, and wrote his thesis on the "Recognition of Governments in International Law: With Particular Reference to Governments in Exile" under the supervision of Sir Ian Brownlie QC. In 1996 was awarded the degree of Doctor of Philosophy (D.Phil.) by the University of Oxford. After the second state exam in law in 1997, he wrote his Habilitation thesis at the Eberhard Karls Universität Tübingen on the "Non-recognition of Illegal States" which examined the legal stauts of non-recognised de-facto States. In 2002, he became a university lecturer in public international law at the University of Oxford and a tutorial fellow of St. Anne's College. He received a Master of Arts from the University of Oxford, and in 2008 became a professor of public international law at the University of Oxford. In late 2011, Talmon succeeded Rudolf Dolzer in the chair of German public law, European Union law and public international law at the University of Bonn and became co-director of the Institute for Public International Law at Bonn. In 2020 and 2024, he returned to Oxford as a visiting fellow of All Soul's College and Christ Church, respectively. Since 2017, he has been editor of the blog "German Practice in International Law".

He qualified as an English Barrister in 2007 (Lincoln's Inn) and practices part-time from chambers in London. He represented several States before the International Court of Justice in The Hague and the European Court of Human Rights in Strasbourg, as well as before national courts in Germany, England and the United States. He also advises governments and multinational corporation on questions of international law. He represented Turkey before the European Court of Human Rights, where the country intervened as a third-party in support of the Turkish politician Doğu Perinçek, who was the first person to be put on trial in Switzerland for denying the Armenian genocide. He also represented Turkey in a case brought by the HDP-politician Selahattin Demirtaş. He was counsel and advocate for Myanmar in the Rohingya genocide case, and sat as an arbitrator at the Permanent Court of Arbitration in a case concerning state-sponsored terrorism.

== Guest professorships ==
- The Hague Academy of International Law (Special Course), Netherlands (2022)
- Academy of European Law, European University Institute, Florence, Italy (2016)
- Centro di Direito Internacional, Belo Horizonte, Brasil (2013)
- Xiamen Academy of International Law, China (2012)
- The Hague Academy of International Law (Director of Studies), Netherlands (2011)
- Katholieke Universiteit Leuven, Belgium (2010)
- Ohio State University, Columbus, United States (2008)
- University of Canterbury, Newzealand (2006)
- Université Paris II Panthéon-Assas, France (2006)
- Ohio State University, Columbus, United States (2005–2009)
- University of Georgia, United States (2005–2009)
- Yeditepe Üniversitesi, Istanbul, Türkiye (2003)
- Université Aix-Marseille III, France (2002, 2003)
- Jaroslaw-Mudryi Akademie, Charkow, Ukraine (2001)

== Selected works ==
- United Nations Security Council: Presidential Statements, Treaty Action and World Legislation. Hong Kong: Chinese University of Hong Kong Press, 2025.
- The South China Sea Arbitration: Jurisdiction – Admissibility - Procedure. Leiden: Brill, 2022.
- German Practice in International Law 2019. Cambridge: Cambridge University Press, 2022.
- Essential Texts in International Law. Cheltenham: Edward Elgar, 2016.
- The South China Sea Arbitration: A Chinese Perspective (published with Bing Bing Jia). Oxford: Hart Publishing, 2014.
- The Legal Order of the Oceans. Basic Documents on the Law of the Sea (published with Vaughan Lowe). Oxford: Hart Publishing, 2009.
- The Occupation of Iraq. The Official Documents of the Coalition Provisional Authority. Oxford: Hart Publishing, 2006.
- Kollektive Nichtanerkennung illegaler Staaten. Grundlagen und Folgen einer international koordinierten Sanktion dargestellt am Beispiel der Türkischen Republik Nord-Zypern. Tübingen: Mohr Siebeck, 2006.
- The Reality of International Law. Essays in Honour of Ian Brownlie (published jointly with Guy S. Goodwin-Gill). Oxford: Clarendon Press, 1999.
- Alles fließt. Kulturgüterschutz und innere Gewässer im Neuen Seerecht (with Wolfgang Graf Vitzthum). Baden-Baden: Nomos, 1998.
- Recognition of Governments in International Law: With Particular Reference to Governments in Exile. Oxford: Clarendon Press, 1998.
