= African Queen (song) =

Single by 2Baba

from the album Face 2 Face
- Released: January 1, 2004
- Genre: Afrobeats; folk; hip hop
- Length: 4:20
- Label: Kennis Music
- Songwriters: Innocent Idibia; Ahmedu Obiabo
- Producer: OJB Jezreel

2Baba singles chronology
"Nfana Ibaga (No Problem)" (2004)	"African Queen" (2004)	"Right Here" (2004)

Music video
- "African Queen" on YouTube

"African Queen" is a song recorded by Nigerian singer 2Baba, released by Kennis Music on 1 January 2004. It was jointly written by 2Baba and Blackface and produced by OJB Jezreel. The song was the second single released from 2Baba's debut studio album Face 2 Face (2004). "African Queen" is an Afrobeats ballad that incorporates elements of West African folk music and hip-hop. It was featured in the movies Phat Girlz (2006) and 10 Days in Sun City (2017). 2Baba filed a defamation lawsuit against Blackface after being accused of stealing the song. Both men settled the matter out of court and the lawsuit was dropped.

"African Queen" was ranked first on Billboard's list of the 50 Greatest Afrobeats Songs of All Time. It received several accolades, including African Song of the Year at the 2005 Ghana Music Awards and Song of the Decade at the 2007 Nigeria Music Awards. The music video for "African Queen" features an appearance by 2Baba's ex-wife Annie Macaulay, and was the first ever video played on MTV Base.

== Background ==
2Baba was a member of Plantashun Boiz, a group composed of himself, Blackface, and Faze. The trio formed in 2000 and put out the albums Body and Soul (2000) and Sold Out (2003) before disbanding. 2Baba signed a record deal with Kennis Music in 2004 and released his debut solo album that same year. He co-wrote the track "African Queen" with Blackface and released it on 1 January 2004. The song was produced by OJB Jezreel, who single-handedly produced the entire Face 2 Face album. 2Baba and Blackface both wrote the lyrics, melody, and the first two verses together. "African Queen" is an Afrobeats ballad that incorporates elements of West African folk music and hip-hop. Friday Omosola of Premium Times said the song explores themes of love and contains "soft melody" and "heartfelt lyrics". Reviewing the album for The Native, Wale Oloworekende praised 2Baba's vocals on the track and said the record opens with guitar strums. In an interview with Seychelles Nation, the singer said the ballad honors African women and celebrates their resilience.

2Baba considers "African Queen" to be a universal song that isn't exclusive to any one individual. In an interview with Akinnagbe Akintomide, he said he recorded the song after having a desire to show love and respect to African women. "Africa Queen" was featured in the 2006 romantic comedy film Phat Girlz, which was directed by Nnegest Likké and stars Mo'Nique. In the film, the song plays after the end credits and during a scene involving the lead character and her romantic partner. "African Queen" was also featured in the movie 10 Days in Sun City, which was directed by Ayo Makun. 2Baba starred in the film, along with Richard Mofe-Damijo, Adesua Etomi, and Uti Nwachukwu

=== IP theft claim ===
In 2013, 2Baba and Annie Macaulay held a wedding ceremony in Dubai. Blackface said he wasn't invited and didn't attend the wedding. 2baba debunked Blackface's comments while speaking on Channels TV's Rubbing Minds. In January 2016, Blackface accused the singer and his manager Efe Omorogbe of intellectual property theft, and said he wrote the songs "African Queen" and "Let Somebody Love You". The former track appeared on Face 2 Face (2004) and the latter on The Ascension (2014). Two years later, 2Baba filed a 50-million naira defamation lawsuit against Blackface. In a letter sent by his lawyers, he told Blackface to retract his statements. On 27 November 2019, both men reached an out-of-court settlement at the Ikeja High Court in Lagos. 2Baba dropped the 50-million naira lawsuit he previously filed.

== Music video ==
The accompanying music video for "African Queen" was the first ever video played on MTV Base. 2Baba's ex-wife, Macaulay, appeared as the lead vixen in the video, along with model and actress Yvonne Jegede. During the promotion of the single "Smile" in 2022, Macaulay revealed that she was a struggling model who dated the singer prior to the video's shoot. Moreover, she said he reached out to her to star in the video. In March 2017, 2Baba released the official video for the remix of "African Queen". It was filmed in South Africa and celebrates his fourth wedding anniversary. The video includes footage from his 2013 wedding to Macaulay.

== Covers ==
In 2010, Jamaican-American singer Sadiki released a reggae version of "African Queen". In 2020, Blackface released his own version of the song; the tack retains key elements of the original lyrics, chorus, verses, and rhythm. Greentea Peng's track "Dingaling", released on her debut project Man Made, contains an interpolation of "African Queen". In May 2024, 2Baba released a remastered version of "African Queen", which appeared on the album's 20th anniversary release.

== Legacy and reception ==
Upon release, "African Queen" gained traction across West Africa, Southern Africa, and Europe. In October 2025, Billboard magazine ranked the song first on its list of the 50 Greatest Afrobeats Songs of All Time. 2Baba won Best Male Video and Best African Video for "African Queen" at the 2005 Channel O Music Video Awards. Likké, who directed the movie Phat Girlz, labeled the track "an iconic song" and said it "struck a universal chord with the world". In an interview with Showmax's Journey of the Beats, 2Baba said the popularity of "African Queen" has eclipsed all of his other music releases.

=== Accolades ===
Year	Awards ceremony	Award description(s)	Results	Ref.
2004	A.M.E.N Awards	Song of the Year	Won	
2004	A.M.E.N Awards	Best Video	Won	
2005	Ghana Music Awards	African Song of the Year	Won	
2005	G.C.E International Awards	Best Song of the Year	Won	
2005	City People Awards for Excellence	Best Male Video	Won	
2005	Channel O Music Video Awards	Best Male Video	Won	
2005	Channel O Music Video Awards	Best African Video of the Year	Won	
2007	Nigeria Music Awards	Song of the Decade	Won	
