= Am in Love =

"Am in love"

Single by Faze

from the album Originality
- Released: October 2008 (Nigeria)
- Recorded: 2008
- Genre: R&B
- Length: 3:25
- Label: Independent Entertainment
- Songwriter(s): Chibuzor 'Faze' Oji
- Producer(s): Waz Beat

Faze singles chronology
"Play Ball" (2006)	"Am in love" (2008)	"Yawa Eh" (2008)

"Am in love" is a song by Nigerian R&B singer Faze. The song was produced by Waz Beat for Faze's third studio album, Originality (2008). "Am in love" is a love ballad written by Faze to great acclaim and reception depicting what might be called the most inspirational ballad ever by him.

== Background and writing ==
"Am in love" is an R&B song which runs for three minutes and twenty-five seconds. The song refers to an imaginary girlfriend of which Faze declares how he feels about her from the in-depth of his heart. The song is constructed in the common verse-chorus form-bridge song pattern. It employs kicks, guitars and snare drums which are all prominent throughout the song. The song employs an increasing but yet entertaining bridge vocals from the artiste after much melo laid-back style delivered verses.

== Release ==
"Am in love" was released to radio stations in October, 2008 as the fifth single off the much anticipated album Originality (it went on to be tag 'The Most Anticipated Album of the Year 2008'). The single was released through his personal record label Independent Entertainment, produced by Waz Beat. By February the single had reached all radio station, creating a great impact as one of the best R&B songs of the year 2008.

== Reception ==
"Am in love" is Faze's most well received love ballad on his new album to critical acclaim and praise and is hailed as one of the best in his entire career as an artiste. A month after the release of his fourth single "Am in love" it received over 8,500 views on youtube.com. By February 19, 2011 it had been viewed over 100,000 times . The song has been tipped by a large number of Faze's international fans as the best song on the album over his Originality smash hit single. Am in love was nominated for the 2009 Nigeria Music Video Awards for Best R&B Video of the Year.
