= Originality (song) =

Single by Faze

from the album Originality
- Released: August 2008 (Nigeria)
- Recorded: 2008
- Length: 3:43
- Label: Independent Entertainment
- Songwriter(s): Chibuzor 'Faze' Oji
- Producer(s): Waz Beat

Faze singles chronology
"Kpo Kpo di Kpo" (2006)	"Originality" (2008)	"Spend my money" (2008)

"Originality" is a song by Nigerian R&B singer Faze, which he wrote, recorded and mastered in one day . The song was produced by Waz Beat for Faze's third studio album, Originality (2008). "Originality" is a song that praises and reminds people about past legends and heroes and the performer in this song references himself in the lyrics saying 'One day una go hala my name O'.

Originality was the last written and recorded single off the platinum selling Originality album. The song was released as the first single from the album in August 2008. The single topped various charts around the Nigeria, including the Vanguards super 7 songs for five non-consecutive weeks, as well globa countdown. Originality is well received by critics and is set to get awards and nominations.

== Background and writing ==
When Faze planned to make a new record after his second album multi-platinum album Independent, he was left with the thought of not having the main hit single to promote the album and then came "Originality", which was written, recorded and mastreed in one day. This landmarks is rear in Nigeria. Indeed, Faze tried something new dropping some old producers and making use of young producers like Waz Beat (22yrs of age), J.Sleek etc. and fortunately came Originality's beat from Waz Beat 'one of Faze's best songs ever'. Faze would quickly record a remix which is on track 9 of the album to further promote his already growing hit as at the time.

== Composition and theme ==
"Originality" is a hip-hop& Reggae influenced song with a ground breaking beat that keeps you entertained until it's all over. It can be best said to be an affirmation song that shows that Faze is one of the best Nigerian artistes of all times.

The lyrics are constructed in the traditional verse-chorus form. It continues to the chorus, following the second verse and chorus. The third verse follows, leading to a more strong vocal and finalizing in the chorus and roaring of Faze's name as an appraisal that he would also be a legend and sang about.

He also pays respect to some dead artists like Bob Marley, Lucky Dube, Brenda Farsie, Osita Osadebe, Oliver De Coke, Orlando Owoh and more.

== Release ==
"Originality" was released to radio stations in August, 2008 as the first single off the much anticipated album Originality (it went on to be tag 'The Most Anticipated Album of the Year 2008'). The single was released through his personal record label Independent Entertainment, produced by Waz Beat and mixed by Indomix all in a day. As at October the single had reached all radio station, reaching the status of a Super-Hit entering all charts in country.

== Reception and chart performance ==
Originality is a well received song by critics and fans and is referenced as the best song in the album as well, One of the biggest hits of 2008. By entering all charts in the country and peaking in #1 in most of them it simply means Originality was nothing but a ground breaking hit and a cracker. As at February, 2011 it had received a total of over 200,000 views on youtube.com

Some new artists on channels such as Nigezie have imitated Faze's Originality lyrics and concept making reference to a lot of legends of the game and believing they would become one in the future.

== Chart ==
Chart name	Peak Position
Vanguard Super 7	1
Globa Countdown	1
Cosmo FM Top 20	1
Cool FM Top 10	1
Rhythm FM Top 10	1

== Trivia ==
- The album also contains a remix version.
- Originality is Faze's second fastest selling album after independent.
- The originality single was one of the most charted songs in 2008.
- It also turned to be one of his best charting songs ever.
