= Expulsion of the Chagossians =

Removal of the population of the Chagos Archipelago, 1967–1973

Location of the Chagos Archipelago in the Indian Ocean

Between 1967 and 1973 the United Kingdom removed the entire population of the Chagos Archipelago in the Indian Ocean, or prevented its members from returning, to make way for a United States military base on Diego Garcia. The islanders, then known as the Ilois and now generally as Chagossians, were taken to Mauritius and Seychelles. The archipelago had been detached from the colony of Mauritius in 1965 to form the British Indian Ocean Territory (BIOT), and in December 1966 the United Kingdom agreed with the United States to take the "administrative measures" needed to make the islands available for defence purposes, including "resettling any inhabitants".

Those who had left the islands for Mauritius in 1967 and 1968 were refused passage home. The population of Diego Garcia was moved in 1971, mainly to the other atolls of the archipelago and to Seychelles and Mauritius, and the last inhabitants left Peros Banhos in May 1973. In Mauritius most lived in severe poverty, and no resettlement scheme awaited them. The United Kingdom paid £650,000 to Mauritius in 1973 and a further £4 million under a 1982 agreement, in return for which most recipients signed or thumbprinted forms renouncing further claims.

From 2000 the Chagossians brought a series of cases in the English courts. In that year the High Court quashed the 1971 ordinance that barred them from the territory, but in 2004 the government restored the ban by Orders in Council, which the House of Lords upheld by three votes to two in 2008. Claims for compensation failed in the English courts and in the European Court of Human Rights. The British government has accepted that the removal was carried out "with a callous disregard of their interests" and has called it "shameful and wrong". In 2016 it decided against resettlement on grounds of feasibility, defence and cost. In its 2019 advisory opinion the International Court of Justice described the resettlement of Chagossians as an issue of human rights to be addressed by the United Nations General Assembly in completing the decolonisation of Mauritius.

== Background ==
=== The islanders ===
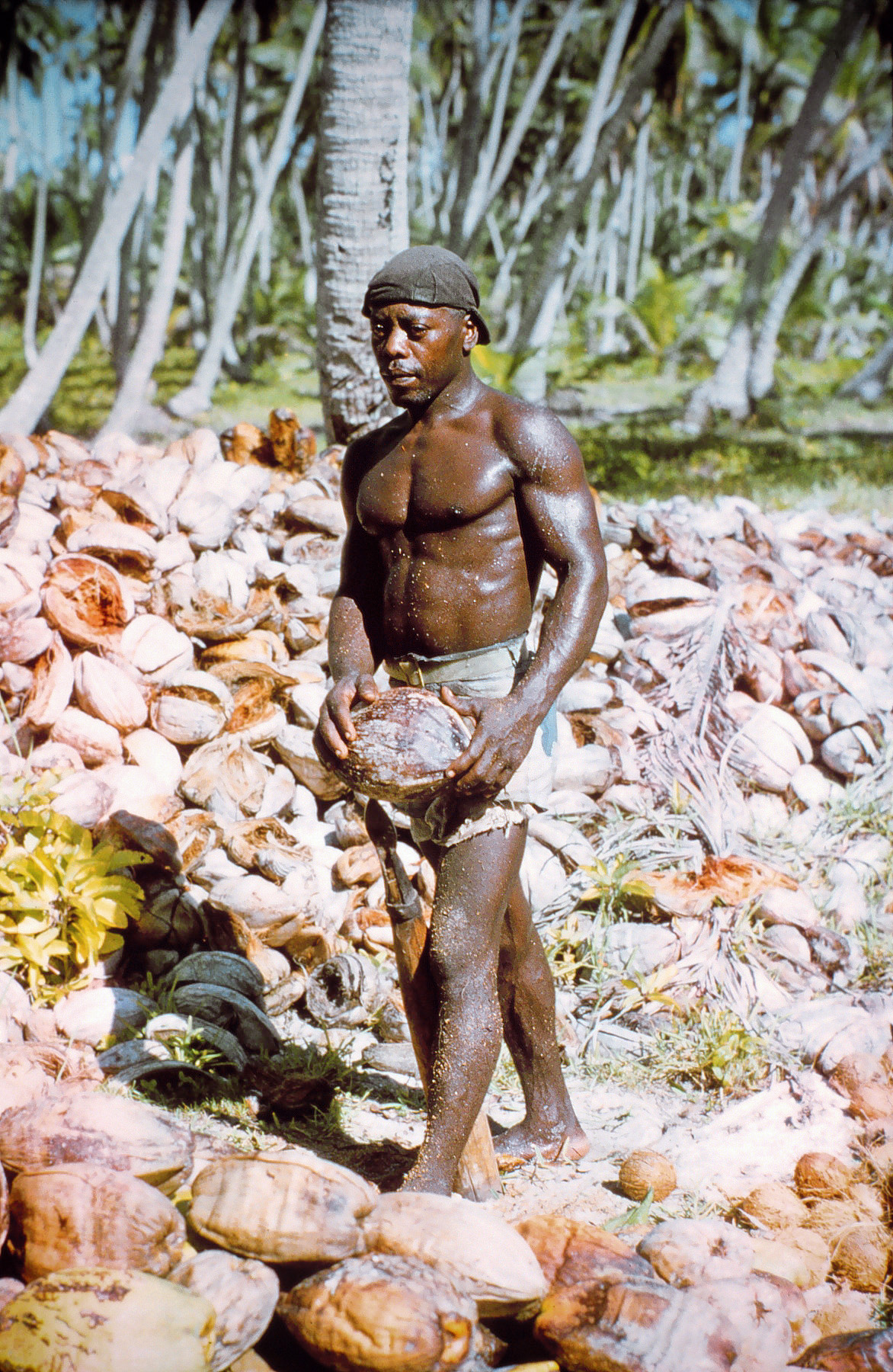
A Chagossian man on Diego Garcia in 1971, at the time of the first American encampment

In the early nineteenth century several hundred people were brought to the Chagos Archipelago from Mozambique and Madagascar as slaves to work on coconut plantations owned by residents of Mauritius; they were freed in the 1830s along with the other enslaved people of Mauritius. In the twentieth century the islands were run by plantation companies "in a somewhat feudal manner", and the company was the sole employer. Contracts of employment ran in theory for one or two years, but were often not formally renewed. By the 1960s the population had three strands: contract workers from Mauritius, contract workers from Seychelles, and families born on the islands, known as the Ilois. According to the missionary Roger Dussercle, about 60 per cent of the population of Diego Garcia in 1933 had been born and raised in the islands. None of the inhabitants owned land; the High Court held in 2000 that this did not affect their rights in public law.

In 1962 the Seychelles-based Chagos Agalega Company bought most of the plantations from a Mauritian company, the Société Huilière de Diégo et Péros. By 1964 about four-fifths of the labour force were Seychellois on contracts of 18 months or two years.

=== Population figures ===
The Chagos Archipelago. Diego Garcia, Peros Banhos and the Salomon Islands were the inhabited atolls.

There is no agreed figure for the number of islanders. A British official counted about 829 people in the archipelago in March 1971, about 359 of them on Diego Garcia: 386 holders of dual British and Mauritian citizenship (the Ilois), 35 Mauritian citizens and 408 citizens of the United Kingdom and Colonies from Seychelles. These numbers were disputed in court; counsel for the Crown accepted that they were "at any rate in the hundreds". A Foreign Office note of November 1965 gave the inhabitants as "1,500 altogether", and a reply to Parliament the same month gave the population of the Chagos as about 1,000. In 1967 the BIOT Commissioner counted 563 Ilois on Diego Garcia, Salomon and Peros Banhos, 327 of them children. In 1968 an official noted "the recent discovery that the numbers of second generation 'Ilois' were much greater than originally anticipated", putting them at 434.

In 1982 the British government based its opening offer on 426 families, or 1,150 people, who had gone to Mauritius after the creation of BIOT. By the time of a group action in 2002, 4,959 former residents and their descendants were claimants.

=== Detachment and the defence agreement ===
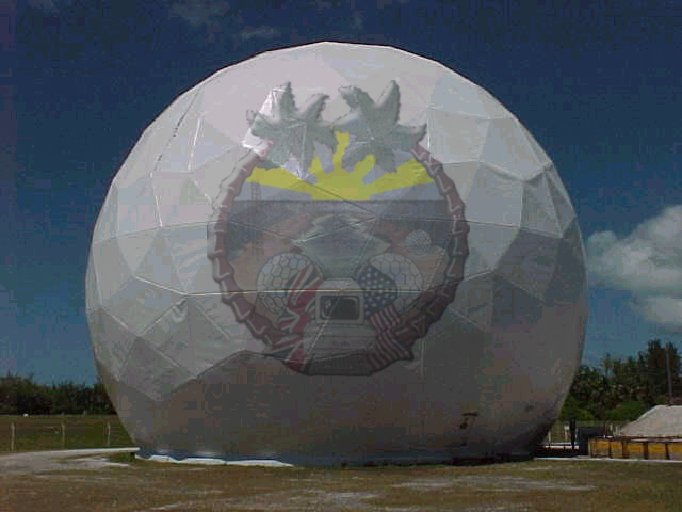
A US Navy radome on Diego Garcia

In 1964 the United Kingdom and the United States surveyed islands in the Indian Ocean for possible military facilities. The British member of the survey, Robert Newton, reported that if the plans went ahead, "the whole of Diego Garcia will be required for defence purposes. This will involve the eviction of the existing civilian population." He recommended that the British government accept responsibility for re-employing the inhabitants on other islands and for resettling in Mauritius and Seychelles those unwilling or unable to accept re-employment.

At Lancaster House in September 1965 the Mauritian ministers agreed to the detachment of the archipelago in return for £3 million and other undertakings, including that the British government would meet "the cost of resettling others affected in the Chagos Islands". Mauritius has argued that its ministers were not given a real choice on the detachment and expulsion of the islanders; the United Kingdom has argued that their consent was freely negotiated, given after independence had been announced, and confirmed by Mauritius for years after independence. The British Indian Ocean Territory was created by an Order in Council on 8 November 1965. On 30 December 1966 the United Kingdom and the United States exchanged notes making the territory available for the defence purposes of both governments for an initial 50 years. A confidential Agreed Minute of the same date provided that the United Kingdom would take the necessary "administrative measures", among them "resettling any inhabitants". The minute remained confidential until it was disclosed in litigation in 2000. The United States agreed in secret to contribute up to £5 million towards the costs of setting up the territory, by waiving British payments for the Polaris missile programme.

== British and American policy on the inhabitants ==
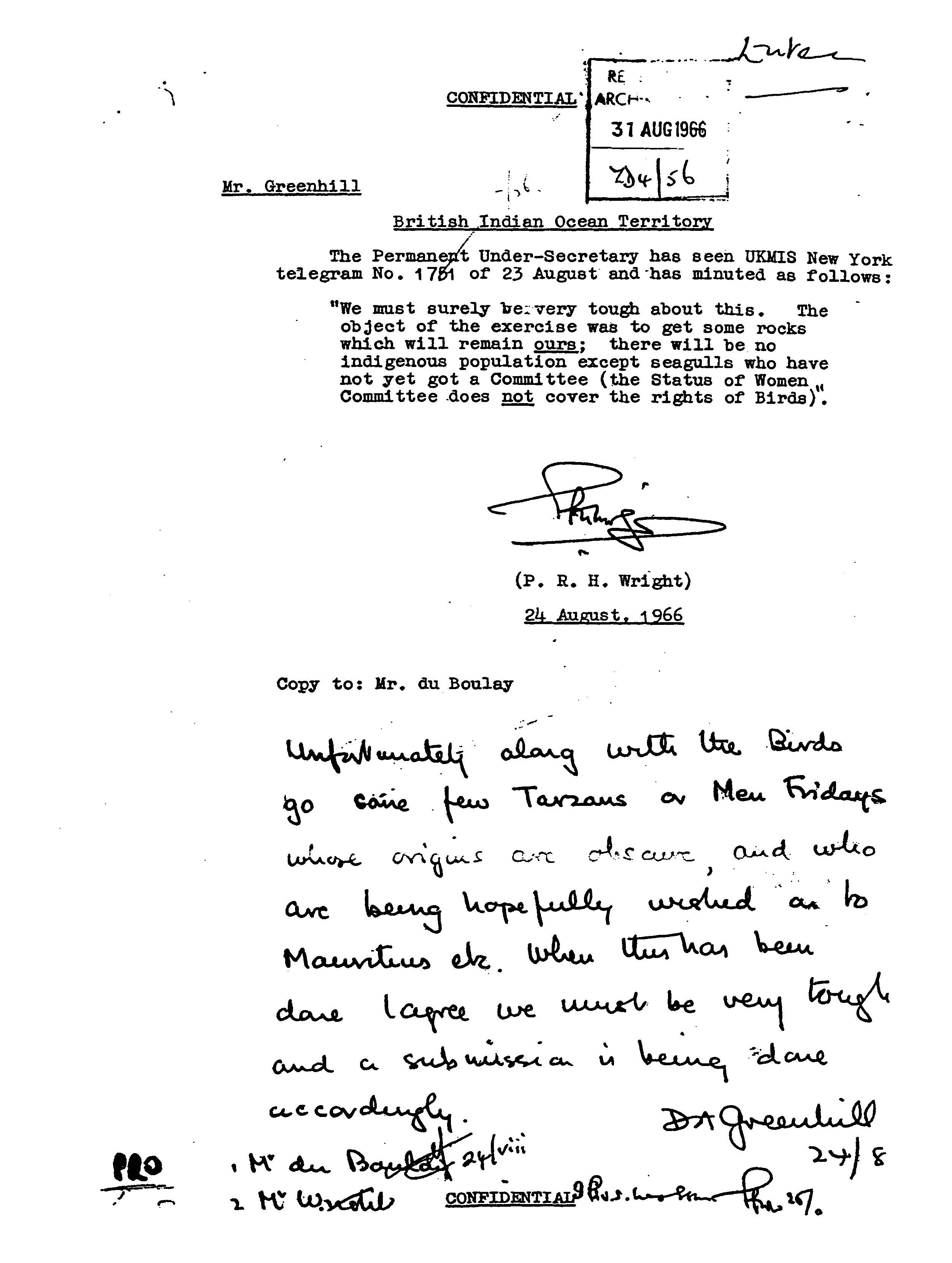
Manuscript minute by D. A. Greenhill, quoted in a Colonial Office note of 24 August 1966: "Unfortunately along with the Birds go some few Tarzans or Men Fridays ..."

Under Chapter XI of the United Nations Charter, a state administering a non-self-governing territory accepts that the interests of its inhabitants are paramount and must report on the territory to the United Nations under Article 73(e). The High Court found in 2003 that both governments recognised from an early stage that the inhabitants would have to be transferred, both for the security of the base and "to avoid... international obligations in Article 73 of the UN Charter". Internal documents disclosed in the litigation, many of them summarised by Lord Justice Laws in 2000 and by Mr Justice Ouseley in 2003, record how British and American officials described the islanders and what they intended for them. Laws found that the papers showed "the concern of the British authorities to present to the outside world a scenario in which there were no permanent inhabitants on the archipelago".

=== Denying a permanent population ===
A Foreign Office memorandum of 28 July 1965 accepted that "a small number of people were born there and, in some cases, their parents were born there too", but stated that "none of them should be regarded as being permanent inhabitants of the islands. Islands will be evacuated as and when defence interests require this." In the absence of permanent inhabitants, it said, the Charter obligations "will not apply to the territory". Guidance sent to the British mission at the United Nations in November 1965 stated that "The islands chosen have virtually no permanent inhabitants". The Permanent Representative, Lord Caradon, replied that "If we could say there are (repeat are) no permanent inhabitants many of these difficulties would not arise". On 15 November 1965 an official advised "a policy of 'quiet disregard'—in other words, let's forget about this one until the United Nations challenge us on it." The next day the British delegation told the Fourth Committee of the General Assembly that the change was "an administrative re-adjustment, freely worked out with the Government and elected representatives of the people concerned".

In February 1966 the Colonial Secretary proposed to the BIOT Commissioner to "avoid any reference to 'permanent inhabitants'", to describe the people as Mauritians and Seychellois, and to issue them with temporary residence permits. A minute of June 1966 explained the reasoning:

They [the Colonial Office] wish to avoid using the phrase 'permanent inhabitants' in relation to any of the islands in the territory because to recognise that there are permanent inhabitants will imply that there is a population whose democratic rights will have to be safeguarded and which will therefore be deemed by the UN Committee of Twentyfour to come within its purview ... Subsequently it may be necessary to issue them with documents making it clear that they are 'belongers' of Mauritius or Seychelles and only temporarily resident in the BIOT. This device, though rather transparent, would at least give us a defensible position to take up in the Committee of Twentyfour.

A manuscript comment on the minute referred to "a certain old fashioned reluctance to tell a whopping fib, or even a little fib, depending on the number of permanent inhabitants". In 1970 the British mission to the United Nations was reminded that it had always tried "to give the impression that there were no inhabitants as such in BIOT", although this was known not to be strictly true of the Chagos. The British government told the ICJ in 2018 that it "regrets not putting before the United Nations in the 1960s a complete picture as to the number of second and third generation inhabitants".

=== How officials described the islanders ===
A Colonial Office note of 24 August 1966 quoted a minute by the Permanent Under-Secretary and a reply by another official, D. A. Greenhill:

We must surely be very tough about this. The object of the exercise was to get some rocks which will remain ours; there will be no indigenous population except seagulls who have not yet got a Committee (the Status of Women Committee does not cover the rights of Birds).

...

Unfortunately along with the Birds go some few Tarzans or Men Fridays whose origins are obscure, and who are being hopefully wished on to Mauritius etc. When that has been done I agree we must be very tough and a submission is being done accordingly.

Mauritius identifies the Permanent Under-Secretary as Sir Paul Gore-Booth. At a meeting on 12 August 1968, officials noted the need to maintain the stance that the population was "merely a bunch of migrant labourers" with no rights other than those of dismissed employees. In March 1971 the Governor of Seychelles, who was also BIOT Commissioner, wrote to the Foreign Office: "It is important when dealing with the problem of the Ilois from Chagos to appreciate what type of people they are. They are extremely unsophisticated, illiterate, untrainable and unsuitable for any work other than the simplest labour tasks on a copra plantation."

=== The intention to remove them ===
According to a Foreign Office summary, a United States memorandum of January 1964 recommended that the United Kingdom "should acquire certain islands, compensating and resettling the inhabitants as necessary". At talks in September 1965 the British side explained that, when defence facilities were installed on an island, "it would be free from local civilian inhabitants". A British paper written after August 1966 set out the aim of being able, when an island was needed, "to clear it of its current population", and added that "we could not accept that the interests of the inhabitants were paramount". The early plan was to move only the people of islands needed for defence, and to resettle them on other islands such as Agaléga.

On 21 April 1969 the Foreign Secretary, Michael Stewart, asked colleagues to agree "that we should aim at the return of the inhabitants of the whole Chagos Archipelago to the Seychelles and Mauritius", noting that officials had found giving them "some element of choice" to be "wholly impracticable". The Prime Minister, Harold Wilson, agreed on 26 April 1969. An official warned the same year: "We must be very careful not to let it appear that our object in moving the Ilois out of BIOT altogether is to prevent there being an 'indigenous population' who would be British citizens and not citizens of Mauritius". On 12 March 1971 the Foreign Office told the High Commission in Mauritius:

our best course is to resettle, as quickly as practicable, the entire population of the Chagos Archipelago ... we do not wish to be accountable to the United Nations for any permanent inhabitants of BIOT.

This was although the Americans had confirmed that only Diego Garcia was likely to be needed. A draft parliamentary answer describing the population as a small number of contract labourers drew the internal comment "is 400 a small number?"; the minister noted that it would do from a parliamentary point of view. In June 1971 the American commanders on Diego Garcia asked the BIOT Administrator for "dates for soonest removal" of the copra workers.

=== The law and concealment ===
In a minute of 23 October 1968, a Foreign Office legal adviser, Anthony Aust, wrote that there was "nothing wrong in law or in principle to enacting an immigration law which enables the Commissioner to deport inhabitants of BIOT", since the United Kingdom had not ratified Protocol No. 4 to the European Convention on Human Rights: "In this respect we are able to make up the rules as we go along and treat the inhabitants of BIOT as not 'belonging' to it in any sense." On 16 January 1970 he set out the purposes of the proposed ordinance:

(a) To provide legal power to deport people who will not leave voluntarily; (b) to prevent people entering; (c) to maintain the fiction that the inhabitants of Chagos are not a permanent or semi-permanent population.

=== The run-down of the plantations ===
The claimants in the group action alleged that the government had deliberately run the plantations down to deprive the population of a livelihood. Ouseley J called this allegation "untenable": the government had wanted to keep the plantations going for as long as possible, though this was in tension "with their desire to avoid having a permanent population on BIOT". A Foreign Office brief on resettlement nevertheless recorded that the plantations had been allowed to run down as a matter of policy since 1965. The judge concluded that "The UK Government compelled the closure of Diego Garcia and the removal of the Ilois from it", and that the later departures from Salomon and Peros Banhos followed from the economic conditions this created.

=== Later official statements ===
In 1975, considering whether to return three islands of the territory to Seychelles, the US State Department wrote that "our experience with the Diego Garcia project has brought an awareness of the political costs", and that the islands' small populations "would have to be displaced in the full glare of Congressional and public scrutiny". A US embassy cable of May 2009 recorded the BIOT Commissioner, Colin Roberts, as saying that there would be no "'human footprints' or 'Man Fridays'" on the uninhabited islands, and that a marine park "would, in effect, put paid to resettlement claims of the archipelago's former residents". In court Roberts denied the "Man Fridays" remark, but accepted that he had said the protected area would put paid to the resettlement claims (see below).

The British government's later position is set out below: it has accepted that the removal was "shameful and wrong" and was carried out "with a callous disregard of their interests".

== Removal ==
=== Those prevented from returning, 1967–1968 ===
In 1967 and 1968 the ship Mauritius carried plantation workers, including Ilois, to Port Louis on leave, at the end of their contracts or for medical treatment. When they tried to go back in 1968 and later, they were refused passage. The claimants said that the British government had instructed Moulinie & Co or its shipping agent not to carry them; the Mauritian government protested to the British government in September 1968. In July 1968 the Mauritian Ministry of Social Security told the British High Commissioner that 120 adults stranded in this way were destitute and were receiving temporary public assistance. In October 1968 officials agreed that it would be very ill-advised to have any Mauritians back on Diego Garcia or any other island of the territory. The company was later allowed to take back 100 Ilois on one-year contracts, but the ship Mauritius was then said to be unable to carry labourers, no other ship was provided, and those stranded in 1967 and 1968 remained in Mauritius. Ouseley J held that the decisions not to re-engage them were made by Moulinie & Co "on the basis of what it thought necessary for employment purposes", rather than on government instructions, but that "the proposals for the defence facility were at the root of the problem". In March 1968 the Foreign Office recorded that 120 Ilois wishing to return to the Chagos had been offered no employment on the plantations, and that the Mauritian authorities considered that they should be resettled in the Chagos at British expense. In July 1968 the BIOT administration acquired the Nordvaer to link the territory with Seychelles, and the shipping link between Mauritius and the Chagos largely ceased. Mauritius states, citing the anthropologist David Vine, that at least 356 Chagossians had been prevented from returning by 1969.

Marie Janine Sadrien, born on Boddam in the Salomon Islands, went to Mauritius with an aunt for medical treatment in 1966; "in 1968 she was told that the islands were closing down and we would not be able to return." Marie Mimose Furcy, born on Île du Coin in Peros Banhos, came to Mauritius in 1967 for her sister's treatment; when her mother asked to go back, "He said that we could not as the place is closing down there." A witness in the group action, Mrs Elysé, said that the shipping agent told her there were no more sailings, that the islands had been sold to the Americans, and that it would not be safe to return because of bombs kept on Diego Garcia.

=== Diego Garcia, 1971 ===
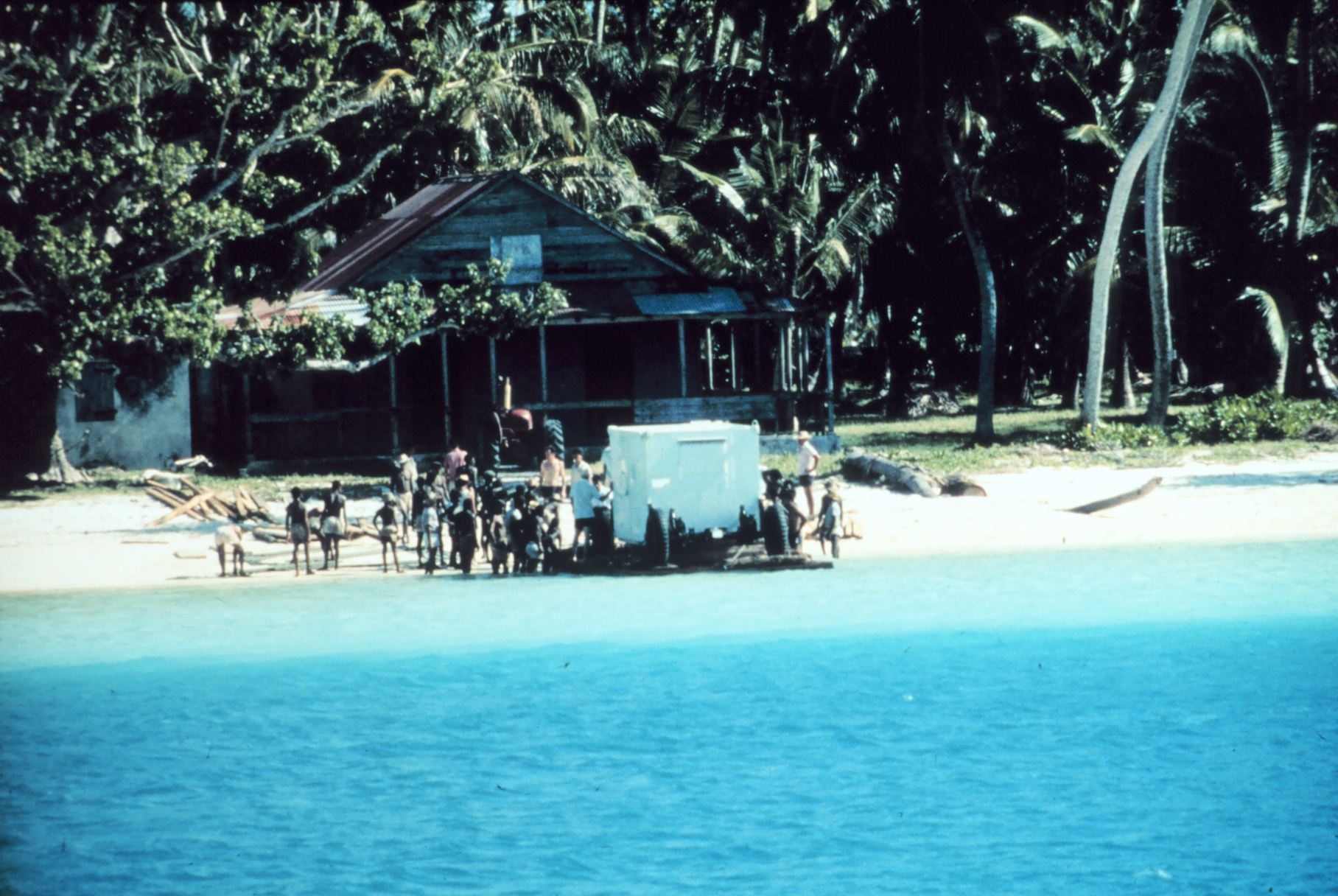
Ilois helping American personnel to bring equipment ashore on Diego Garcia, 1971

On 16 April 1971 the BIOT Commissioner, Sir Bruce Greatbatch, enacted the Immigration Ordinance 1971, which made it unlawful to enter or remain in the territory without a permit and allowed the Commissioner to order a person's removal. It was given "the minimum lawful publicity". Whether it was used to remove anyone was disputed. Lord Hoffmann said in 2008 that there was "no evidence that it had ever been used to expel anyone", and that those who left did so "because they were left with the alternative of being abandoned without support or supplies". The British government has described the ordinance as having "provided for the compulsory removal of the existing civilian population" and prohibited their return.

The Nordvaer reached Diego Garcia on 25 July 1971 and took some Ilois to Salomon and Peros Banhos before sailing to Mahé in Seychelles; the schooner Isle of Farquhar, chartered from Moulinie & Co, arrived in September. The islanders left behind their homes, pets and larger possessions, taking only a few personal belongings. The High Court found: "There is no evidence of physical force being used, but most of their dogs were rounded up and gassed or burnt in the 'calorifer' used in copra production." Mauritius, quoting Vine, states that Greatbatch ordered the plantation manager, Marcel Moulinie, to kill the dogs, and that they were gassed in a copra-drying shed with exhaust from American military vehicles. In a 1999 statement Moulinie said that the decision was a response to the large number of strays left behind, and that it was not meant to frighten the islanders, though he could understand if it had. The closure of the island was handled almost entirely by Moulinie & Co rather than the BIOT administration. The families moved to Peros Banhos and Salomon received a disturbance payment of 500 rupees each; their chickens could not be moved, and their vegetable gardens had to be left behind. In seeking Treasury approval, an official explained that the payment would avoid hardship and the risk of "a back-stage chorus of islanders" protesting to Mauritian politicians "that HMG were treating them callously and unfairly". The Ilois were given a choice of going to Peros Banhos, Salomon, Agaléga or Mauritius; in Ouseley J's words, "There was only no choice available of staying on." Witnesses told the court that they had been told there would be no more food on the island, and Marcel Moulinie gave evidence that, although no physical force was used, the islanders were told "that there was no more food and that there would be nothing left on the island".

The Nordvaer had also been sent to collect five wild horses for the Seychelles Department of Agriculture; Marcel Moulinie protested in a telegram: "With all the deck passengers I have for Mahe how on earth can we carry horses?" The voyage to Mahé was, in the court's words, "dreadful", and left "many bitter memories of the horses being better cared for than the passengers". In Mahé the Ilois were housed in an unused section of the prison from 30 September until they sailed for Port Louis on 8 October 1971. The Governor of Seychelles told the Foreign Office that they had been put in "a modern unused prison building" because no other accommodation was available. The Mauritian Prime Minister told the British High Commissioner: "I cannot understand how these people have suddenly been evacuated from Chagos without any prior notification to Mauritius Government". Mauritius states that the final 146 inhabitants of Diego Garcia were carried on the Nordvaer, whose capacity was 72, and that two women were reported to have miscarried. The evacuation of Diego Garcia was completed on 31 October 1971. The ICJ described this as "The main forcible removal of Diego Garcia's population", which "took place in July and September 1971". Afterwards Peros Banhos and Salomon had a population of 65 men, 70 women and 197 children, of whom 85 had come from Diego Garcia.

=== Salomon and Peros Banhos, 1972–1973 ===
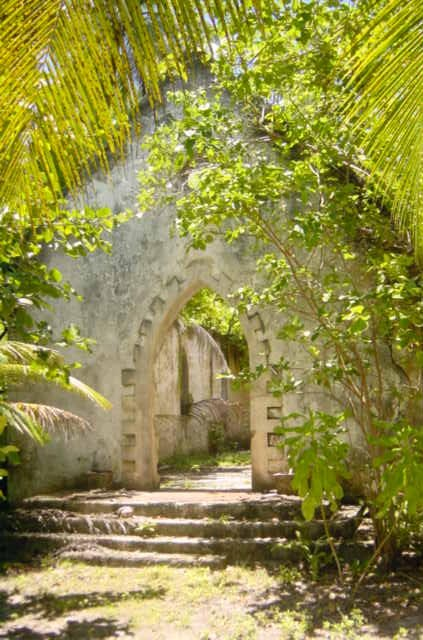
The abandoned church on Boddam Island, Salomon Atoll, in 2008

The plantations on Peros Banhos and Salomon were running down and becoming uneconomic. In May 1972 the people of Salomon were told to move to Peros Banhos, but refused. In June 1972 the Nordvaer took 53 Ilois to Mahé and on to Mauritius, having told them that "we cannot guarantee return passages"; in November 1972 it took another 120 to Mauritius, by which time Salomon had closed. Todd reported in July 1972 that the islands had been run "on a care and maintenance basis" and that the labour force had been kept "below an economic level due to the uncertainty on the islands' future". Lord Hoffmann summarised the position: "No force was used but the islanders were told that the company was closing down its activities and that unless they accepted transportation elsewhere, they would be left without supplies." Marie Liseby Elysé, who was born on Peros Banhos, said that for about six months or more before they left, the islanders "no longer had rice, flour, oil, milk etc." Rosemond Samynaden recalled that Todd and Moulinie announced that the people of Peros Banhos would have to leave, and that "We could only bring a mattress and a box in which we kept our clothes."

In October 1972 the United Kingdom and the United States agreed by exchange of notes on the construction of a limited naval facility on Diego Garcia. Moulinie and Todd sought to close Peros Banhos in March or April 1973. In February 1973 the British High Commissioner warned that islanders arriving in Mauritius should be told that life there would "not be a bed of roses", as the resettlement scheme had not been put into operation. On 27 April 1973 the Nordvaer left Peros Banhos with 26 men, 27 women and 80 children. At Port Louis they at first refused to disembark: "they had nowhere to go, no money and no employment". They were offered accommodation in the Dockers Flats area of Port Louis and a small sum of money. The last voyage left Peros Banhos on 26 May 1973 and reached Port Louis via Seychelles on 13 June 1973, carrying 8 men, 9 women and 47 children: "This was the last of the population; the plantations closed." Elysé, who was four months pregnant, described the departure: "It felt that we were all attending a funeral and at the same time we were dying." Of the arrival she said: "It took us 4 days to reach Mauritius. We were simply dumped there." Another witness, Mrs Talate, told the High Court that on the last voyage from Peros Banhos "they were treated on the journey just like people she had seen in a film about slaves".

=== Islanders taken to Mauritius ===
Most of the islanders were taken to Mauritius because of their long connection with it. From 1814 to 1965 the archipelago was administered as a dependency of the colony of Mauritius. The islanders were descended from enslaved people brought to work on coconut plantations owned by residents of Mauritius, and from labourers recruited there; over time they married Mauritian recruits, and some of their children left for Mauritius, where they had relatives. Contracts of employment were signed in Mauritius before a magistrate, and the workers travelled between contracts to and from Mauritius on the ship Mauritius, half of whose cost was met by the Mauritian government. A Foreign Office paper prepared for ministers in 1969 described the Ilois as people who "still regard themselves as Mauritians" but "also look on themselves as Chagos islanders", and who "can be regarded as having their main roots in Chagos". At Mauritian independence in 1968, most of them became Mauritian citizens automatically.

British policy also pointed to Mauritius: the Lancaster House undertaking of 1965 to meet "the cost of resettling others affected" was read by a Foreign Office legal adviser as necessarily contemplating resettlement in Mauritius, and as obliging the Mauritian government to accept it. The Seychellois contract workers, who had mixed little with the Ilois and rarely stayed for more than two contracts, were returned to Seychelles; about 100 went there when Diego Garcia was closed.

The alternatives considered by British officials came to nothing: resettlement on other islands of the territory was rejected "because of the inadvisability of having a permanent population in which the UN could take an interest". The Chief Minister of Seychelles was "extremely worried" about taking unskilled workers who would be regarded as Mauritians, "particularly unpopular there", and by March 1971 there was "no prospect" of settling Mauritian Ilois in Seychelles. Plans to settle 50 to 150 families on Agaléga, a Mauritian island where Moulinie & Co ran plantations, lapsed when the company withdrew in November 1971, and none of those on the Nordvaer in April 1973 accepted its offer of work there. In 1969 a Foreign Office department had warned that sending the Ilois to Mauritius would mean "the dumping of unemployables in the heavily over-populated island of Mauritius against the protest of an indignant Mauritius Government - not to mention the Ilois themselves". A minority went to Seychelles, among them families with Seychellois connections, and nothing was provided for them there.

== Life in exile ==
The Ilois knew plantation work but had little other experience; most were illiterate and spoke only Creole. Mauritius itself had high unemployment and widespread poverty. The High Court found that "extreme poverty routinely marked their lives", and that they faced insults and discrimination because of their poverty and background. "There was no resettlement scheme when they arrived", and the schemes debated afterwards, including pig breeding, were abandoned as unworkable. Nothing was provided for the Ilois in Seychelles.

In October 1971 the British High Commissioner reported that those who had arrived since 1968 had been destitute, "living in conditions of extreme poverty". In December 1971 the Mauritian government counted 1,151 people who had come from the Chagos since 1965, on whom it had spent Rs 2,140,000 in public assistance. A Mauritian ministerial committee found in February 1972 that, of 250 heads of household, 86 were unemployed and 134 in casual work such as dock labour; only 43 had permanent jobs, some of them very poorly paid domestic service. The Mauritian government proposed housing estates and a pig-breeding co-operative. British aid officials considered the scheme certain to fail, but the Foreign Office supported funding it "so that we can get ourselves off the hook on which we impaled ourselves, without too much thought, a good many years ago".

In October 1974 Ilois representatives delivered a petition to the British High Commission saying that they had no food, jobs or care, that forty of them had died "through sorrow, poverty, lack of food and care", and asking to be allowed to visit their ancestors' graves on Diego Garcia. The High Commissioner replied that he "cannot intervene between yourselves as Mauritians and the Government of Mauritius", which had assumed responsibility for their resettlement. In 1976 a British social development adviser, Mr Prosser, reported to the Mauritian government: "The fact is that the Ilois are living in deplorable conditions which could be immediately alleviated if action is taken along the lines I have suggested." By then the cost of housing in Mauritius had risen by more than 500 per cent since the £650,000 was agreed.

The High Court noted that there was "little challenge to the general description" of conditions given by Chagossian witnesses, which was supported by contemporaneous material, although their evidence on details was in places unreliable. Mrs Talate said that the housing first offered to her had no door, windows, light or water, that two of her children died shortly after their arrival, and that she worked as a domestic servant doing "the degrading jobs which Mauritians would not do". In Seychelles, Jeanette Alexis said that her family lived for many years in an abandoned cow shed, and another witness, Mrs Piron, said that she had lived for some months in a ditch with her children. When a Chagossian in Seychelles sought compensation in 1978, the Foreign Office replied that the resettlement payment had been made to the Mauritian government, not to individuals. Lord Hoffmann said in 2008 that "For the most part, the community was left to fend for itself in the slums of Port Louis".

In 2003 Mr Justice Ouseley wrote that the islanders had been "uprooted from the only way of life which they knew" and taken to places "where little or no provision for their reception, accommodation, future employment and well-being had been made". He added: "The Chagossians alone were made to pay a personal price for the defence establishment on Diego Garcia".

== Compensation ==
=== The 1972 payment ===
After talks in 1972, the British government offered Mauritius £650,000, the cost of a Mauritian resettlement scheme, provided that Mauritius accepted it "in full and final discharge" of the undertaking given at Lancaster House to meet the cost of resettling people displaced from the archipelago. The Mauritian Prime Minister, Sir Seewoosagur Ramgoolam, accepted on 4 September 1972, stating that this did not affect Mauritius' rights over minerals, fishing and other matters. The money was paid in March 1973. The Mauritian government announced that it would be used to build houses for the Ilois, with roads, water, electricity, schools and community centres, and plots of land for vegetable gardening or animal breeding. The High Court found that "Nothing concrete was done with it for years despite the pressing housing needs of the Ilois". Inflation between 1973 and 1978 sharply reduced the value of the payment, and it was finally distributed, with interest, as cash in 1977 and 1978 to 595 families: the 426 families identified as having left since 1965 and 169 families who had left earlier.

=== The Vencatessen claim and the 1982 agreement ===
In February 1975 Michel Vencatessen, a Chagossian, sued the British government in London for damages for intimidation, deprivation of liberty and assault in connection with his removal in 1971. The case "came to be accepted on both sides as raising the whole question of the legality of the removal". In 1978 the British government offered £500,000 to settle it on behalf of all eligible islanders in Mauritius. Negotiations between the two governments, with Ilois representatives and their English lawyers present, led the British government to raise its opening offer of £2.5 million to £4 million, in addition to the £650,000 already paid; Mauritius agreed to contribute land worth £1 million. The lawyers advising the Ilois recommended acceptance as a fair settlement. The agreement was signed on 7 July 1982, and the £4 million was handed over on 22 October 1982. The Vencatessen claim was stayed by agreement.

Under the agreement the payment was made "ex gratia with no admission of liability" and in "full and final settlement" of all claims arising from the closure of the plantations, the departure or removal of the inhabitants, their resettlement in Mauritius and "their preclusion from returning". Mauritius undertook to obtain from each member of the Ilois community a signed renunciation of claims. It set up an Ilois Trust Fund by statute, which provided that nothing in the Act affected Mauritian sovereignty over the archipelago.

=== Renunciation forms ===
About £4 million was paid out to 1,344 Ilois in 1983 and 1984. When they collected the final instalment, they were asked to sign, or more often thumbprint, a renunciation form, which the High Court described as "a one-page legal document, written in legal English, without a Creole translation". "Only 12 refused to sign." The British government regards the renunciations as "freely made and broad". Mauritius cites a United Nations working group report suggesting that the "no return" clause was not understood by many illiterate Chagossians, and says that the number who refused may have been higher than 12. The English courts later held that claimants who had signed the forms and taken the money had settled their claims.

== Protests and campaigns, 1975–1999 ==
On 9 September 1975 The Washington Post published an article by David Ottaway, "Islanders Were Evicted for U.S. Base". The same year The Sunday Times published "The Islanders that Britain Sold". A British briefing paper for talks with the United States in November 1975 referred to "the outcry over the workers removed from the Chagos Archipelago". At the talks a British official spoke of "Recent Parliamentary and Congressional pressures in the matter of the former contract workers". In 1975 a Methodist preacher from Kent, George Champion, began a one-man picket of the Foreign Office with a placard reading "Diego Garcia", which he kept up until his death in 1982.

In Mauritius the opposition Mauritian Militant Movement questioned the legality of the detachment of the islands and the removal of the islanders. According to the Mauritian party Lalit, six Chagossian women went on hunger strike at Bain des Dames in Port Louis in 1978, and there were street demonstrations over Diego Garcia.

== Litigation in the United Kingdom ==
=== Overview ===
The following table lists the principal cases brought by or concerning the Chagossians.

| Case | Court | Years | Outcome |
|---|---|---|---|
| Vencatessen v Attorney General | High Court, England and Wales | 1975–1982 | Damages claim for removal from the archipelago; stayed by agreement after the 1982 UK–Mauritius settlement |
| Bancoult (No 1) | Divisional Court | 2000 | Section 4 of the 1971 Immigration Ordinance quashed; government did not appeal |
| Chagos Islanders v Attorney General | High Court; Court of Appeal | 2002–2004 | Group claim for compensation and return struck out; permission to appeal refused |
| Bancoult (No 2) | Divisional Court; Court of Appeal; House of Lords | 2006–2008 | 2004 Orders in Council quashed below; upheld by the House of Lords, 3–2 |
| Bancoult v. McNamara | US District Court; D.C. Circuit; US Supreme Court | 2001–2007 | Claims against the United States dismissed as political questions; certiorari denied |
| Chagos Islanders v United Kingdom | European Court of Human Rights | 2004–2012 | Application declared inadmissible |
| Bancoult (No 3) | Divisional Court; Court of Appeal; Supreme Court | 2013–2018 | Challenge to the Marine Protected Area dismissed, 5–2; leaked US cable held admissible |
| Mauritius v United Kingdom | Arbitral tribunal under the Law of the Sea Convention | 2010–2015 | The court held that Marine Protected Area declared by the UK is in breach of the Convention |
| Bancoult (No 2) (application to set aside) | Supreme Court | 2015–2016 | Application to set aside the 2008 decision refused, 3–2 |
| Horeau (consultation challenge) | High Court | 2016 | Permission to challenge the 2015 resettlement consultation refused |
| Hoareau and Bancoult | Divisional Court; Court of Appeal | 2017–2020 | Challenge to the 2016 decision against resettlement dismissed |
| Legal Consequences of the Separation of the Chagos Archipelago from Mauritius in 1965 | International Court of Justice | 2017–2019 | Advisory opinion: decolonisation of Mauritius not lawfully completed; resettlement a human rights issue for the General Assembly |
| Pompe and Mandarin | High Court | 2025–2026 | Challenge to the 2025 treaty: permission refused |
| Mandarin v Commissioner | Supreme Court of the British Indian Ocean Territory | 2026 | Section 9 of the 2004 Constitution Order and the removal notices quashed; stayed pending appeal |

=== Bancoult (No 1), 2000 ===
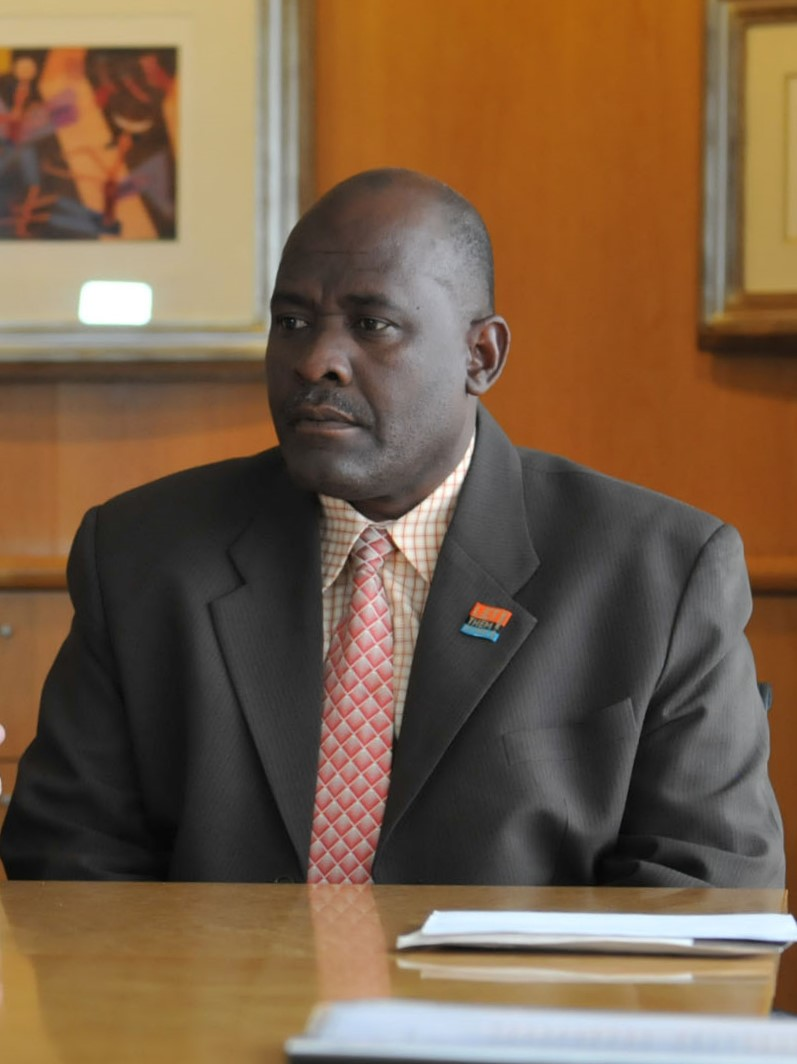
Olivier Bancoult, leader of the Chagos Refugees Group, in 2013

Olivier Bancoult, a Chagossian, applied for judicial review of the 1971 Immigration Ordinance. On 3 November 2000 the Divisional Court (Laws LJ and Gibbs J) quashed section 4 of the ordinance. It held that the power to legislate for the "peace, order and good government" of the territory did not extend to excluding its population: "They are to be governed: not removed." Laws LJ recalled Tacitus' "They make a desert and call it peace": "He meant it as an irony; but here, it was an abject legal failure."

The Foreign Secretary, Robin Cook, announced the same day that the government would not appeal and would make a new ordinance allowing the Ilois to return to the outer islands, adding: "This Government has not defended what was done or said thirty years ago." The Immigration Ordinance 2000 allowed people connected with the territory to enter any island except Diego Garcia. In Lord Hoffmann's words, "the change in the law made no practical difference... No one went to live there." A feasibility study commissioned in 1999 concluded in 2002 that resettlement for subsistence might be possible in the short term, but that long-term resettlement would be "precarious and costly".

=== Group compensation action, 2002–2004 ===
In April 2002 several thousand Chagossians and their descendants issued a group claim against the Attorney General and the BIOT Commissioner for compensation and a declaration of a right to return. After a 37-day hearing, Ouseley J struck the claim out on 9 October 2003. He held that the claims of those who had signed renunciation forms were an abuse of process, that all the claims were time-barred, and that there was no arguable case in misfeasance or deceit, nor any tort of exile. He also said that at least some claimants "could show that they were treated shamefully by successive UK Governments".

On 22 July 2004 the Court of Appeal refused permission to appeal. It acknowledged "the shameful treatment to which the islanders were apparently subjected", including "the deliberate misrepresentation of the Ilois' history and status, designed to deflect any investigation by the United Nations" and "the use of legal powers... for the illicit purpose of depopulating them". The court drew a parallel with the Highland Clearances: "the pauperisation and expulsion of the weak in the interests of the powerful still gives little to be proud of." The government later protested that it had been given no opportunity to answer the allegation of deliberate misrepresentation, which it did not accept. The court said that a return "may not be too late", but that it was "a function of economic resources and political will, not of adjudication."

=== The 2004 Orders and Bancoult (No 2) ===
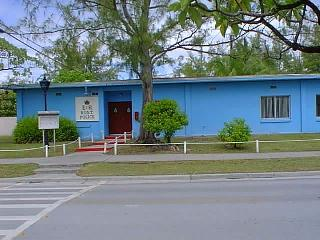
Headquarters of the British Indian Ocean Territory Police on Diego Garcia, 2005

On 10 June 2004 the government made the British Indian Ocean Territory (Constitution) Order 2004 and the British Indian Ocean Territory (Immigration) Order 2004 under the royal prerogative. Section 9 of the Constitution Order declared that, because the territory was set aside for the defence purposes of the United Kingdom and the United States, "no person has the right of abode in the Territory". The minister, Bill Rammell, told Parliament that in the light of the feasibility study and of defence needs "it would be impossible for the Government to promote or even permit resettlement to take place", and that the Orders restored the legal position as it had been understood before November 2000. He later said that the decisions of the 1960s and 1970s "do not, to say the least, constitute the finest hour of UK foreign policy".

Bancoult challenged the Orders, and on 11 May 2006 the Divisional Court (Hooper LJ and Cresswell J) quashed section 9 as irrational, since it served only British and American interests. The court found that "The Chagossians were thus effectively exiled", and called the suggestion that a minister could exile a whole population by Order in Council "repugnant". On the reason the islanders left, it said: "they left because they were required to leave in fulfilment of the 1966 confidential Minute". On 23 May 2007 the Court of Appeal dismissed the government's appeal. Lord Justice Sedley held that the Orders were an abuse of power and frustrated a legitimate expectation created by Cook's statement, and that they negated "the freedom to return to one's homeland, however poor and barren the conditions of life".

On 22 October 2008 the House of Lords allowed the government's appeal by three to two. Lord Hoffmann, Lord Rodger and Lord Carswell held that the Orders were open to judicial review but were not irrational, given considerations of feasibility, cost and security, and that Cook's statement was not a clear promise. Lord Hoffmann held that the right of abode was "a creature of the law" which the Crown could remove, and that in legislating for the territory the Crown was "entitled... to prefer the interests of the United Kingdom". He also held that the European Convention on Human Rights did not apply to the territory. In dissent, Lord Bingham held that "there was no royal prerogative power to make an order in council containing section 9", and Lord Mance held that the prerogative did not extend to depriving the inhabitants of the right to enter and live in the territory.

=== Application to reopen Bancoult (No 2), 2016 ===
In 2012 documents came to light about the drafting of the 2002 feasibility study, which had not been disclosed in the 2008 proceedings. Bancoult applied to the Supreme Court to set aside the House of Lords decision. On 29 June 2016 the court refused by three to two. Lord Mance, for the majority, held that the failure to disclose was "culpable" but not intentional, and that the documents would not have changed the outcome. He observed that "the background has shifted, and logically the constitutional ban needs to be revisited", and noted the government's acceptance that any Chagossian could challenge a failure to lift it. Lord Kerr, with whom Lady Hale agreed, found that the final feasibility report had turned a conditional forecast of flooding into a firm prediction without evidence for the change, and that the consultants had been told the outcome the government hoped for. He held that "the appeal might well have been decided differently".

=== The Marine Protected Area and Bancoult (No 3), 2010–2018 ===
On 1 April 2010 the BIOT Commissioner, Colin Roberts, declared a marine protected area around the archipelago. A United States embassy cable of 15 May 2009, published by WikiLeaks, recorded Roberts as saying that "establishing a marine park would, in effect, put paid to resettlement claims of the archipelago's former residents". Bancoult argued that the area had been created for that improper purpose. The Divisional Court (Richards LJ and Mitting J) dismissed the claim on 11 June 2013. It held the cable inadmissible under the Vienna Convention on Diplomatic Relations. Roberts, who was cross-examined, denied having used the phrase "Man Fridays" recorded in the cable. The court noted that a briefing note he wrote on 5 May 2009 had said that a protected area might help "calm down the resettlement debate", but found "simply no ground to suspect" that the Foreign Secretary had acted for an improper purpose, observing that "What prevents the return of Chagossians to the islands is the 2004 Order, not the MPA." On 23 May 2014 the Court of Appeal held that the cable was admissible, since it "had already been disclosed to the world by a third party", but dismissed the appeal because the cable would have made no difference. It recorded that in cross-examination Roberts "accepted that he did say to the US officials that the establishment of an MPA would in effect put paid to the resettlement claims", describing this as "a recognition of a reality". On 8 February 2018 the Supreme Court held that the cable was admissible in evidence, but dismissed the appeal by five to two, holding that the cable would not have altered the finding that the Foreign Secretary, David Miliband, had no improper motive; Lord Kerr and Lady Hale dissented. Separately, the arbitral tribunal in Mauritius v. United Kingdom found in 2015 that the declaration of the area breached the United Nations Convention on the Law of the Sea.

=== Challenges to resettlement policy, 2016–2020 ===
In August 2016 Chagossians living in Seychelles sought judicial review of the 2015 consultation on resettlement, and Mrs Justice Andrews refused permission on 12 August 2016, holding that the government "was under no duty to consult on a decision that it was not intending to make". She described the claimants as representatives of former inhabitants "who were forcibly exiled from their homeland" and referred to "a long line of cases seeking redress for this historic wrong".

Bancoult and Solange Hoareau, who was born on Diego Garcia in 1953 and removed with her family to Seychelles, challenged the government's 2016 decision against resettlement (see below). The Divisional Court dismissed the claims on 8 February 2019, observing that "Judicial review is not, and should not be regarded as, politics by another means." The Court of Appeal dismissed the appeal on 30 July 2020. It held that, while recognising a human right relating to resettlement, neither the ICJ's 2019 advisory opinion nor the General Assembly's resolution "actually decided anything about that right".

=== Challenge to the 2025 treaty ===
In 2025 two Chagossians, Bertrice Pompe and Louis Michel Mandarin, with his son Misley Mandarin, sought judicial review of the government's failure to consult Chagossians before agreeing to transfer sovereignty to Mauritius. An out-of-hours injunction granted at 2.25 am on 22 May 2025 briefly delayed the signing of the treaty; it was discharged later that morning, and the treaty was signed shortly after noon. On 10 March 2026 Mrs Justice Stacey refused permission, holding that the claims were in substance a challenge to the treaty-making prerogative and non-justiciable. She held that there was no duty to consult, since "the Chagossians have never had any right of abode or settlement on the Islands since their ancestors were first brought there".

=== Litigation in the British Indian Ocean Territory, 2026 ===
After four Chagossians landed on Île du Coin on 16 February 2026, the territory's immigration officer issued removal notices on 18 February. The claimants, Louis Misley Mandarin, Louis Michel Mandarin, Louis Antoine Lemettre and Guy Shane Adrien Castel, sought judicial review in the Supreme Court of the British Indian Ocean Territory, which granted an interim injunction against their removal on 19 February. On 31 March 2026 the Chief Justice, James Lewis KC, quashed section 9 of the 2004 Constitution Order, which denied any right of abode, as "an unlawful and irrational exercise of the prerogative". He followed the dissenting speeches of Lord Bingham and Lord Mance in the 2008 case, holding that "A claimed power to exclude a whole population must be justified by legal source, not administrative necessity", and found that, given Article 6 of the 2025 treaty, "there is no defence or national security concerns anymore against repopulating the outer islands by Chagossians". He also quashed the removal notices as procedurally unfair. The judgment was critical of both sides: the judge found that "the court was misled about the true nature of the trip" and that the claimants "entered into the Territory illegally", adding that nothing in the decision gave them a right "to set up a permanent camp", but he also wrote that "The Chagossians in reality are treated worse than tourists and yachtsmen". The Commissioner was given permission to appeal, and the effect of the quashing orders was stayed pending the appeal. The territory's Court of Appeal heard the appeal on 15–17 July 2026, and on 4 November gave notice that it would hand down judgment on 12 November.

== Proceedings outside the United Kingdom ==
=== United States ===
In December 2001 Bancoult and other Chagossians sued the United States and former officials, including Robert McNamara, in the United States District Court for the District of Columbia. They alleged that the islands had been depopulated in stages: those who travelled were not allowed to return, supplies were cut off, and the rest were removed by ship. The district court dismissed the claims in 2004, and on 21 April 2006 the Court of Appeals for the D.C. Circuit affirmed, holding them to be non-justiciable political questions. Judge Janice Rogers Brown wrote that the base policy and the measures used to depopulate the islands formed "a sort of Möbius strip that we cannot sever without impermissibly impugning past policy". The Supreme Court of the United States denied a petition for certiorari on 16 January 2007.

=== European Court of Human Rights ===
In 2004 1,786 Chagossians applied to the European Court of Human Rights. On 11 December 2012 the court declared the application inadmissible. It held that "at no time was the right of individual petition extended to BIOT", since the United Kingdom had never made a declaration for the territory under the Convention's colonial clause. It also held that those who had accepted compensation and renounced their claims could no longer claim to be victims. The court described "the heart of the applicants' claims" as "the callous and shameful treatment which they or their antecedents suffered from 1967 to 1973", but said that later litigation was "part of an overall campaign to bring pressure to bear on Government policy rather than disclosing any new situation".

=== United Nations bodies ===
In 2001 the United Nations Human Rights Committee noted the United Kingdom's acceptance that its prohibition of the return of the Ilois had been unlawful, and recommended that it "seek to make exercise of the Ilois' right to return to their territory practicable" and consider compensation. In 2008 it regretted that the United Kingdom had again omitted the territory from its report on the ground that, having no population, the International Covenant on Civil and Political Rights did not apply to it. It recommended that the United Kingdom "ensure that the Chagos islanders can exercise their right to return to their territory" and consider compensation "for the denial of this right over an extended period".

The Committee on the Elimination of Racial Discrimination regretted in 2016 that the United Kingdom continued "to maintain its position that the Convention does not apply to the British Indian Ocean Territory on the grounds that it has no permanent population", and urged it to consult the Chagossians "to facilitate their return to their islands and to provide them with an effective remedy, including compensation". It repeated the recommendation in 2024, noting a "lack of progress" in withdrawing restrictions on their entry to the islands. In October 2024 a group of United Nations special rapporteurs and independent experts stated that "all Chagossians have the right to return to live in the Chagos Islands, including Diego Garcia". In June 2025 several of them said that the treaty with Mauritius "appears to be at variance with the Chagossians' right to return" and called "for the ratification of the agreement to be suspended". The British government responded that the experts' views were "not binding" and said that it had worked to ensure that the agreement reflected the importance of the islands to Chagossians. In December 2025 the CERD, under its early-warning procedure, called on Mauritius and the United Kingdom "to suspend the ratification of the bilateral agreement" and to obtain the Chagossians' "free, prior and informed consent". According to a statement issued on their behalf, the procedure had been triggered on 26 May 2025 by two Chagossian women born on Diego Garcia who opposed the treaty, Bernadette Dugasse and Bertrice Pompe. Mauritius told the committee in December 2025 that it deplored the decision, which it said caused "serious prejudice to the Republic of Mauritius as a sovereign state", and a British minister told the House of Lords in January 2026 that "The UK does not agree with the approach that the CERD has taken". In June 2025 the same two women wrote to the Human Rights Committee alleging that the treaty breached the International Covenant on Civil and Political Rights. The United Kingdom has not accepted the Covenant's individual complaints procedure.

== Resettlement policy ==
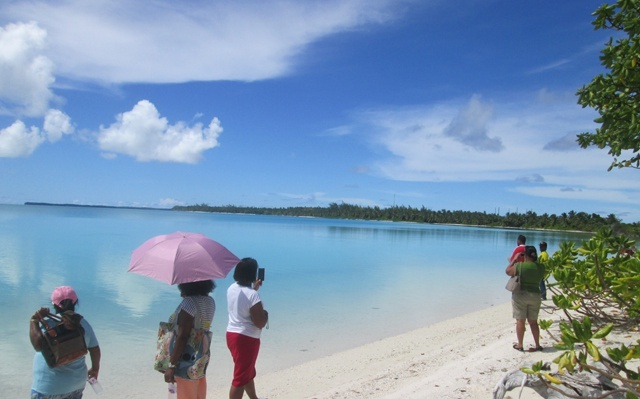
Chagossians from Seychelles on a visit to the territory sponsored by the British government, 2015

On 20 December 2012 the British government announced a review of its policy on resettlement. A feasibility study by KPMG, published in February 2015, examined options for 1,500, 500 and 150 settlers, and concluded that resettlement was possible, "although there would be significant challenges". In a public consultation in 2015, 98 per cent of the 832 self-declared Chagossians who responded favoured resettlement in principle; according to the British government, once the realistic level of services was explained, 25 per cent were in favour, 6 per cent against and 67 per cent unclear.

On 16 November 2016 the government announced that it "has decided against resettlement of the Chagossian people to the British Indian Ocean Territory on the grounds of feasibility, defence and security interests, and cost to the British taxpayer". It acknowledged that the manner of the removal "was wrong and we look back with deep regret", and announced instead "a package of approximately £40 million over the next ten years" for Chagossian communities where they lived, including an expanded programme of visits to the islands. Mauritius objected that the decision had been made without consulting it; the British government said that Mauritius had declined to engage. Chagossians have been able to make short visits to the islands, but after 2000 none went back to live there. Rosemonde Berthin, who left Salomon in 1972, said: "We reach there early morning and we have to leave in the afternoon at 3 pm... I do not want to visit. I am not a visitor. It is my home".

== Sovereignty proceedings ==
In 2007 the President of Mauritius, Sir Anerood Jugnauth, threatened to leave the Commonwealth over the issue. In arbitration under the Law of the Sea Convention, the British Attorney General, Dominic Grieve, told the tribunal in 2014: "we regret very much the circumstances in which they were removed from the islands and recognise that what was done then should not have happened". The tribunal set out the history of the removals but made no finding on them.

On 22 June 2017 the General Assembly asked the International Court of Justice for an advisory opinion, in Resolution 71/292. Its second question referred to "the inability of Mauritius to implement a programme for the resettlement on the Chagos Archipelago of its nationals, in particular those of Chagossian origin". In the oral proceedings the United Kingdom stated that it "fully accepts that the manner in which the Chagossians were removed from the Chagos Archipelago, and the way they were treated thereafter, was shameful and wrong, and it deeply regrets that fact". Mauritius called the British expressions of regret "belated and inadequate".

In its advisory opinion of 25 February 2019, the court found that the population had been "either prevented from returning or forcibly removed and prevented from returning by the United Kingdom", and that "By virtue of United Kingdom law and judicial decisions of that country, they are not allowed to return". It found that the decolonisation of Mauritius had not been lawfully completed, and that the resettlement of Mauritian nationals, "including those of Chagossian origin, is an issue relating to the protection of the human rights of those concerned, which should be addressed by the General Assembly during the completion of the decolonization of Mauritius". The General Assembly welcomed the opinion in Resolution 73/295 of 22 May 2019, affirming that "The resettlement of Mauritian nationals, including those of Chagossian origin, must be addressed as a matter of urgency during the completion of the decolonization process".

== The 2025 agreement ==
On 22 May 2025 the United Kingdom and Mauritius signed a treaty under which the United Kingdom accepts Mauritian sovereignty over the archipelago, while retaining Diego Garcia for an initial 99 years. Its preamble records that "past treatment of Chagossians has left a deeply regrettable legacy". Article 6 provides that Mauritius "is free to implement a programme of resettlement on the islands of the Chagos Archipelago other than Diego Garcia". According to Full Fact, the agreed payments include £40 million to capitalise a trust fund for Chagossians. Chagossians were divided: the Chagos Refugees Group led by Bancoult supported the agreement because it allowed resettlement, while groups based in the United Kingdom said they had not been consulted. As of November 2026 the treaty had not entered into force.

On 16 February 2026 four Chagossians, led by Misley Mandarin, landed on Île du Coin in Peros Banhos in protest against the transfer. The BIOT administration issued removal orders, and on 19 February the territory's Chief Justice granted an interim injunction preventing their removal. In March 2026 the court quashed the 2004 ban on the right of abode, a decision stayed pending appeal (see above).

== Characterisations ==
The ICJ said the inhabitants were "forcibly removed and prevented from returning". Mauritius speaks of "forcible removal" and "forcible expulsion". The British government has generally used the words "removal" and "evacuation", and has said that it "treated the Chagossians very badly at and around the time of their removal". The English courts have spoken of the islanders being "effectively exiled" and of "the pauperisation and expulsion of the weak in the interests of the powerful", while finding no evidence that physical force was used.

Lord Hoffmann attributed the government's conduct "very largely" to its "refusal to acknowledge that there was any indigenous population", adopted because of a fear "(which may well have been justified)" that the Soviet Union and its "non-aligned" supporters would use Article 73 of the Charter to prevent the building of the base. According to the 2009 embassy cable, a Foreign Office official said that the United Kingdom did "not regret the removal of the population", since removal was necessary for the territory to fulfil its strategic purpose.

In February 2023 Human Rights Watch published a report, written mainly by Clive Baldwin and based on interviews with 43 Chagossians, which concluded that "the continuing forced displacement of the Chagossians, the prevention of their permanent return to their homeland, and their persecution on racial and ethnic grounds amount to crimes against humanity", and that "The first crime, at least, was jointly committed by UK and US authorities". It called for reparations, including "immediately lifting the ban on Chagossians permanently returning", compensation and apologies. The Foreign Office said that it "categorically reject[s] this characterisation of events", while repeating its "deep regret about the manner in which Chagossians were removed". The US State Department told Human Rights Watch that it "acknowledges the challenges faced by Chagossian communities".

== See also ==
- Stealing a Nation, a 2004 documentary by John Pilger
- Forced displacement
- Right of return
- List of UN resolutions concerning the Chagos Archipelago

== Sources ==
=== Court decisions ===
- R v Secretary of State for the Foreign and Commonwealth Office, ex parte Bancoult, EWHC Admin 413 (High Court (Divisional Court) 3 November 2000).
- Chagos Islanders v Attorney General and HM BIOT Commissioner, EWHC (QB) 2222 (High Court 9 October 2003).
- Chagos Islanders v Attorney General and HM BIOT Commissioner, EWCA Civ 997 (Court of Appeal 22 July 2004).
- R (Bancoult) v Secretary of State for Foreign and Commonwealth Affairs, EWHC (Admin) 1038 (High Court (Divisional Court) 11 May 2006).
- R (Bancoult) v Secretary of State for Foreign and Commonwealth Affairs, EWCA Civ 498 (Court of Appeal 23 May 2007).
- R (Bancoult) v Secretary of State for Foreign and Commonwealth Affairs (No 2), UKHL 61 (House of Lords 22 October 2008).
- R (Bancoult) v Secretary of State for Foreign and Commonwealth Affairs, EWHC (Admin) 1502 (High Court (Divisional Court) 11 June 2013).
- R (Bancoult) v Secretary of State for Foreign and Commonwealth Affairs, EWCA Civ 708 (Court of Appeal 23 May 2014).
- R (Horeau and others) v Secretary of State for Foreign and Commonwealth Affairs, EWHC (Admin) 2102 (High Court 12 August 2016).
- R (Bancoult No 2) v Secretary of State for Foreign and Commonwealth Affairs, UKSC 35 (Supreme Court 29 June 2016).
- R (Bancoult No 3) v Secretary of State for Foreign and Commonwealth Affairs, UKSC 3 (Supreme Court 8 February 2018).
- R (Hoareau and Bancoult) v Secretary of State for Foreign and Commonwealth Affairs, EWHC (Admin) 221 (High Court (Divisional Court) 8 February 2019).
- R (Hoareau and Bancoult) v Secretary of State for Foreign and Commonwealth Affairs, EWCA Civ 1010 (Court of Appeal 30 July 2020).
- R (Pompe) v Secretary of State for Foreign, Commonwealth and Development Affairs; R (Mandarin) v Secretary of State for Foreign, Commonwealth and Development Affairs, EWHC (Admin) 529 (High Court 10 March 2026).
- R (Mandarin and others) v HM Commissioner for the British Indian Ocean Territory (Supreme Court of the British Indian Ocean Territory 31 March 2026), Text.
- R (Mandarin and others) v HM Commissioner for the British Indian Ocean Territory: Order (Supreme Court of the British Indian Ocean Territory 31 March 2026), Text.
- "Cause list, 15–17 July 2026: HM Commissioner for the British Indian Ocean Territory v The King (on the application of Mandarin & Ors), [2026] BIOT CA (Civ) 1" (PDF). British Indian Ocean Territory Court of Appeal. 2026.
- "Notice of judgment hand down: His Majesty's Commissioner for the British Indian Ocean Territory v The King (on the application of Mandarin & Ors), [2026] BIOT CA (Civ) 1" (PDF). British Indian Ocean Territory Court of Appeal. 4 November 2026.
- Chagos Islanders v United Kingdom, Application no. 35622/04 (European Court of Human Rights 11 December 2012).
- Bancoult v. McNamara, 445 F.3d 427 (D.C. Cir. 21 April 2006).
- "Docket No. 06-502: Bancoult v. McNamara". Supreme Court of the United States. 16 January 2007. Certiorari denied, 549 U.S. 1166 (2007).
- Legal Consequences of the Separation of the Chagos Archipelago from Mauritius in 1965, Advisory Opinion (PDF). I.C.J. Reports 2019. International Court of Justice. 25 February 2019.
- In the Matter of the Chagos Marine Protected Area Arbitration (Mauritius v. United Kingdom): Award (PDF). Permanent Court of Arbitration. 18 March 2015.

=== Pleadings and archival documents ===
- Written Statement of the United Kingdom (PDF). International Court of Justice. 15 February 2018.
- Written Statement of the Republic of Mauritius (PDF). Vol. I. International Court of Justice. 1 March 2018.
- Written Comments of the Republic of Mauritius (PDF). Vol. I. International Court of Justice. 15 May 2018.
- Memorial of the Republic of Mauritius. Vol. I. Permanent Court of Arbitration. 1 August 2012.
- Memorial of the Republic of Mauritius: Annexes 1–80 (PDF). Vol. II. Permanent Court of Arbitration. 1 August 2012. Page numbers are those of the PDF volume. Includes R. Newton, Report on the Anglo-American Survey in the Indian Ocean (1964, Annex 2); FCO, British Indian Ocean Territory 1964–1968: Chronological Summary of Events (Annex 3); and correspondence on the 1972 payment (Annexes 66–69).
- United Kingdom Mission to the United Nations (8 November 1965). Telegram No. 2837 to the Foreign Office (PDF) (Report) – via Written Statement of the Republic of Mauritius (ICJ), Annex 77.
- Moulinie, Marcel. "Witness statement, 22 November 1999". The Chagos Archive Documents Collection.

=== Government and United Nations documents ===
- "British Overseas Territories Act 2002 (c. 8)". legislation.gov.uk.
- "The British Overseas Territories Act 2002 (Commencement) Order 2002 (SI 2002/1252)". legislation.gov.uk. 1 May 2002.
- "Diego Garcia Military Base and British Indian Ocean Territory Bill". Hansard, House of Lords. 5 January 2026.
- Home Office (2022). "Nationality and Borders Bill: Chagossian nationality factsheet". GOV.UK.
- Prime Minister's Office (Mauritius) (12 December 2025). Highlights of Cabinet Meeting – Friday 12 December 2025 (PDF) (Report). Government of Mauritius.
- Rammell, Bill (15 June 2004). "British Indian Ocean Territory (written ministerial statement)". Hansard, House of Commons. pp. 32WS–34WS.
- Duncan, Alan (16 November 2016). "Update on the British Indian Ocean Territory (HCWS260)". UK Parliament.
- United Nations Human Rights Committee (29 October 2001). Concluding observations: United Kingdom of Great Britain and Northern Ireland (CCPR/CO/73/UK) (Report).
- United Nations Human Rights Committee (30 July 2008). Concluding observations: United Kingdom of Great Britain and Northern Ireland (CCPR/C/GBR/CO/6) (PDF) (Report).
- United Nations Human Rights Committee (3 May 2024). Concluding observations on the eighth periodic report of the United Kingdom of Great Britain and Northern Ireland (CCPR/C/GBR/CO/8) (Report).
- Committee on the Elimination of Racial Discrimination (3 October 2016). Concluding observations on the twenty-first to twenty-third periodic reports of the United Kingdom (CERD/C/GBR/CO/21-23) (Report).
- Committee on the Elimination of Racial Discrimination (24 September 2024). Concluding observations on the twenty-fourth to twenty-sixth periodic reports of the United Kingdom (CERD/C/GBR/CO/24-26) (Report).
- Committee on the Elimination of Racial Discrimination (2 December 2025). Decision 1 (2025): Mauritius and the United Kingdom (early warning and urgent action procedure, INT/CERD/EWU/11263), advance unedited version (Report). Office of the United Nations High Commissioner for Human Rights.
- Ozkan, Mevlut (8 December 2025). "UN committee urges UK, Mauritius to respect Chagossians' right to return to Diego Garcia Island". Anadolu Agency.
- "Chagossians should be centre stage in negotiations between Mauritius and the UK: UN experts" (Press release). Office of the United Nations High Commissioner for Human Rights. 10 October 2024.
- "Agreement between Mauritius and the UK fails to guarantee rights of Chagossians, say UN experts" (Press release). Office of the United Nations High Commissioner for Human Rights. 10 June 2025.
- United Nations General Assembly (22 June 2017). Resolution adopted by the General Assembly on 22 June 2017: 71/292 (A/RES/71/292) (Report). United Nations.
- United Nations General Assembly (24 May 2019). Resolution adopted by the General Assembly on 22 May 2019: 73/295 (A/RES/73/295) (Report). United Nations.
- Agreement between the Government of the United Kingdom of Great Britain and Northern Ireland and the Government of the Republic of Mauritius concerning the Chagos Archipelago including Diego Garcia (CS Mauritius No.1/2025, CP 1334) (Report). Foreign, Commonwealth and Development Office. 22 May 2025.

=== Books and news ===
- Chambers, Bala (22 October 2021). "Will Britain give citizenship rights to all Chagos islanders?". Al Jazeera English.
- Demetriadi, Alexi (22 June 2017). "Lost in exile: The forgotten Chagos Islanders". New Internationalist.
- Baldwin, Clive; Human Rights Watch (15 February 2023). "That's When the Nightmare Started": UK and US Forced Displacement of the Chagossians and Ongoing Colonial Crimes (PDF) (Report). Human Rights Watch. ISBN 979-8-88708-029-1.
- "UK actions over Chagos Islands 'crimes against humanity', says rights group". Inverness Courier. PA Media. 15 February 2023.
- Maddox, David; Mitchell, Archie (11 June 2025). "United Nations experts call for Starmer's Chagos deal to be suspended". The Independent.
- Diver, Tony (5 June 2025). "Starmer's Chagos deal reported to UN human rights chiefs". The Daily Telegraph.
- Evers, Sandra; Kooy, Marry (2011). Eviction from the Chagos Islands: Displacement and Struggle for Identity Against Two World Powers. Brill. ISBN 978-90-04-20441-6.
- "Chagossian activists challenge legality of new bilateral agreement". Seychelles Nation. 10 June 2025.
- Stacey, Kiran (5 November 2026). "Burnham wants to 'recast' Chagos Islands deal after US resistance". The Guardian.
- Winchester, Simon (2003). Outposts: Journeys to the Surviving Relics of the British Empire. Penguin. ISBN 978-0-14-101189-9.
- Ottaway, David B. (9 September 1975). "Islanders Were Evicted for U.S. Base". The Washington Post.
- Lallah, Rajni (2 November 2010). "Rajni Lallah on Women in Chagos & Diego Garcia Struggles". Lalit.
- "President's threat over Chagos". BBC News. 7 March 2007.
- Mallinder, Lorraine (11 February 2025). "'Tug of war': Chagos Islands deal tearing families apart in Mauritius". Al Jazeera English.
- Ridgwell, Henry (10 March 2025). "British plan to cede Chagos Islands sovereignty prompts concerns over China threat". Voice of America.
- Thompson, Tony; Smith, Hannah (6 February 2026). "How much is the UK spending on the Chagos deal?". Full Fact.
- AFP (18 February 2026). "Chagos islanders say they refuse to leave in protest against UK handover". Arab News.
- "Britain issues removal orders to four who landed on Chagos atoll". Reuters. 18 February 2026.
- "Deportation of Chagos Islanders blocked by judge". BBC News. 19 February 2026.
- Arjanee, Ameerah (2 October 2026). "UK-Mauritius Chagos sovereignty deal stalls amid fears of further delays". Al Jazeera English.
