= Weekend Nation =

Weekend Nation may refer to:

In newspapers:

- Weekend Nation, the Friday edition of The Daily Nation (Barbados)
- Weekend Nation, the weekend edition of The Nation (Malawi)
- Weekend Nation, the weekend edition of the Seychelles Nation
- Weekend Nation, the weekend edition of The Nation (Sri Lanka)
