= R (Hoareau and Bancoult) v Secretary of State for Foreign and Commonwealth Affairs =

2019 and 2020 English judicial review of the decision against Chagossian resettlement

- Court: High Court of Justice (Divisional Court); Court of Appeal
- Full case name: R (on the application of Hoareau and Bancoult) v Secretary of State for Foreign and Commonwealth Affairs
- Decided: 8 February 2019 (Divisional Court); 30 July 2020 (Court of Appeal)
- Citations: [2019] EWHC 221 (Admin); [2019] 1 WLR 4105; [2020] EWCA Civ 1010

Case history
- Prior actions: R (Horeau and others) v Secretary of State for Foreign and Commonwealth Affairs [2016] EWHC 2102 (Admin) (permission to challenge the 2015 consultation refused)
- Subsequent actions: Applied in R (Pompe) v Secretary of State for Foreign, Commonwealth and Development Affairs [2026] EWHC 529 (Admin)

Court membership
- Judges sitting: Divisional Court: Singh LJ and Carr J Court of Appeal: the Master of the Rolls, Green LJ and Dingemans LJ

Keywords
- Judicial review; irrationality; right of abode; European Convention on Human Rights Article 56; public sector equality duty; consultation; ICJ advisory opinion

R (Hoareau and Bancoult) v Secretary of State for Foreign and Commonwealth Affairs, also known as Bancoult (No 5), was a judicial review in the courts of England and Wales of the United Kingdom government's decision, announced on 16 November 2016, not to support the resettlement of the Chagossians in the British Indian Ocean Territory (BIOT) and instead to fund a support package of about £40 million over ten years for Chagossians where they now live. The claimants were Solange Hoareau, a Chagossian born on Diego Garcia who was removed to Seychelles, and Olivier Bancoult, the chair of the Chagos Refugee Group.

A Divisional Court of Singh LJ and Carr J dismissed both claims on 8 February 2019. It held that the decision was rational, that the European Convention on Human Rights did not apply to the BIOT, that the public sector equality duty had been met, and that the 2015 consultation and the support package were lawful. It ended by observing that "Judicial review is not, and should not be regarded as, politics by another means."

The claimants appealed, relying in part on the 2019 advisory opinion of the International Court of Justice and United Nations General Assembly Resolution 73/295, both issued after the Divisional Court's judgment. On 30 July 2020 the Court of Appeal dismissed the appeal. It held that neither the opinion nor the resolution decided anything about a right of resettlement, and that they did not bring the Convention into play or enlarge the common law right of abode. In 2026 the High Court treated the issues decided in the case as settled.

== Background ==
=== Expulsion and earlier litigation ===
The claims had their roots in the removal of the whole Chagossian population from the Chagos Archipelago between 1966 and 1972; no Chagossian has lived on the islands since 1973. The removal made way for a United States military base on Diego Garcia. The Court of Appeal noted that "no one now contends" that the expulsion was anything other than wrongful, that the claims arising from it had been compromised and paid, and that those settlements had not removed the wish of at least some Chagossians to live on the islands. In 1982 the United Kingdom paid £4 million to the Ilois Trust Fund in Mauritius in full and final settlement, but no payment was ever made to the Chagossians in Seychelles.

The Divisional Court later quashed the key section of the 1971 immigration ordinance that had excluded the Chagossians, in Bancoult (No 1). In 2004 the government made the British Indian Ocean Territory (Constitution) Order and the British Indian Ocean Territory (Immigration) Order, which again denied the Chagossians a right of abode. The House of Lords upheld those orders by a majority in Bancoult (No 2) in 2008. In Chagos Islanders v United Kingdom, decided on 20 December 2012, the European Court of Human Rights declared the Chagossians' application inadmissible.

=== Policy review and Bancoult (No 4) ===
On the day of the Strasbourg decision, the Foreign Secretary announced that the government would review its policy on resettlement. The government commissioned an independent feasibility study from KPMG, which was published in February 2015. The Divisional Court later described the report's conclusion that resettlement was feasible as accurate but "oversimplistic" without more, since KPMG had found that any resettlement would raise significant political, defence and environmental concerns, as well as cost.

On 29 June 2016 the Supreme Court, in Bancoult (No 4), refused by a majority to set aside the House of Lords' decision in Bancoult (No 2). Lord Mance said that, in light of the KPMG study, "In practical terms, the background has shifted, and logically the constitutional ban needs to be revisited." He recorded counsel for the government as accepting that any Chagossian could challenge the failure to abrogate the 2004 Orders. Lord Clarke added that it would in principle be open to Bancoult to seek judicial review of any future refusal to permit or support resettlement.

=== 2016 challenge to the consultation ===
Between August and October 2015 the government consulted Chagossians and other interested parties on the demand for resettlement, its likely costs, and alternatives to it. (Note: The 2016 judgment is reported as R (Horeau and others) v Secretary of State for Foreign and Commonwealth Affairs. The 2019 judgment refers to it as R (Hoareau and others).) Ms Hoareau and other Chagossians living in Seychelles sought judicial review of the consultation. They argued that it had misrepresented its scope, because the government was not willing to pay direct financial support to Chagossians who did not resettle; that this refusal was irrational; and that it breached the public sector equality duty under section 149 of the Equality Act 2010. Seychellois Chagossians had asked in their consultation responses for compensation, pensions and financial support for families in need.

Ouseley J refused permission on the papers, and on 12 August 2016 Andrews J refused a renewed application on all three grounds. She held that the consultation was "clearly about resettlement" and agreed that "the Government was under no duty to consult on a decision that it was not intending to make". The claimants' argument that excluding financial support would be irrational if large-scale resettlement were chosen was one that she did not consider "even gets off the ground". On the equality duty, she held that no substantive decision had yet been taken and that the ground "does not meet the threshold for permission at this stage, and may never arise".

=== The 2016 decision ===
The National Security Council ruled out resettlement at a meeting on 15 March 2016 attended by the Prime Minister, and asked Oliver Letwin to review a package of support instead. After a change of Prime Minister, the decision was reconfirmed through correspondence among ministers in October and November 2016.

On 16 November 2016 the government announced in a written ministerial statement that it had "decided against resettlement of the Chagossian people to the British Indian Ocean Territory on the grounds of feasibility, defence and security interests, and cost to the British taxpayer". The statement said that the manner of the Chagossians' removal "was wrong and we look back with deep regret". It announced a package of about £40 million over ten years for health, social care, education and employment, and an expanded programme of visits to the BIOT, and confirmed that the defence agreements with the United States would continue until 30 December 2036.

== Claims ==
The claims were issued on 22 February 2017, Ms Hoareau acting particularly for Chagossians in Seychelles and Mr Bancoult particularly for those in Mauritius. Ms Hoareau was born on Diego Garcia in 1953 and was relocated to Seychelles with her parents and seven of her siblings without consent. Mr Bancoult, named in the judgments as Louis Bancoult, was born on Peros Banhos in 1964; his family were prevented from returning in 1968 after travelling to Mauritius for hospital treatment.

Both claimants challenged the decision against resettlement (the "Resettlement Decision") and the implicit decision not to remove the bar on the Chagossians' right of abode (the "Right of Abode Decision"); Ms Hoareau alone challenged the decision on the support package. Between them they raised some 15 grounds, which the court grouped into six issues: the right of abode, the Human Rights Act 1998, the public sector equality duty, irrationality, the consultation, and the support package. The claimants argued that the KPMG study had changed the factual position since 2002, so that the government was obliged to reconsider the constitutional ban as a prior question, and that ministers had been misled on material points.

The Secretary of State argued that the decisions were taken at the highest level of government after an extensive review, that they involved defence, international relations and public spending, and that they called for a significant margin of discretion. He also argued that the Human Rights Act did not apply to the BIOT and that the equality duty did not apply to the resettlement decision.

Mr Fitzgerald QC and Mr Jaffey QC appeared for the claimants, and Sir James Eadie QC and Mr Kovats QC for the Secretary of State. The full hearing took place from 10 to 14 December 2018, after many interlocutory hearings during 2018. Part of the evidence was heard within a confidentiality ring, and summaries of ministers' written contributions were prepared for the open hearing so as to protect collective cabinet responsibility, a step the court was told was unprecedented.

== Divisional Court judgment ==
=== Standard of review ===
The court held that the test for the substance of the decisions was irrationality, not proportionality, and that only the Supreme Court could change that. It rejected the claimants' argument that the decision interfered with fundamental common law rights, so as to call for the heightened scrutiny described in R v Ministry of Defence, ex p Smith; the court said: "This is not a case where fundamental rights are affected, unlike Ex p. Smith." This was because the earlier legal rights had been extinguished by the 2004 Orders, whose validity could not be challenged in these proceedings. Because the decisions concerned public spending, defence and international relations, and were taken at the highest level, "A wide margin of judgment is afforded by the law to the executive in this context."

=== Right of abode ===
The claimants argued that the Secretary of State should have considered lifting the 2004 ban separately from, and before, the question of supported resettlement. The court held that this ground was "both unrealistic and wrong". The right of abode had always been "inextricably linked" to the practicalities of resettlement, as shown by the fact that nobody had gone to live on the islands while it existed between 2000 and 2004.

On Bancoult (No 4), the court found it unnecessary to decide whether the majority's remarks were part of the ratio. It held that the justices had described the factual position as counsel had put it, and "were not laying down any rule of public law to suggest that there would be some legal obligation to revisit what had been upheld in Bancoult 2." The only possible source of such an obligation was irrationality, and the Secretary of State "was rationally entitled to take the view that, if resettlement should not take place, there was no need for, or any practical point in, revisiting the 2004 Orders".

=== European Convention on Human Rights ===
The claimants relied on Article 8 and Article 1 of the First Protocol to the Convention. The court held that the "first and decisive objection" was that the House of Lords had held in Bancoult (No 2) that the Convention and the Human Rights Act did not apply to the BIOT, because the United Kingdom had made no declaration extending it there under Article 56. The claimants argued that later decisions applying Al-Skeini v United Kingdom, on jurisdiction based on control, had impliedly overruled that holding. The court rejected this: domestic courts remained bound by the House of Lords, and the European Court had itself held in Chagos Islanders v United Kingdom that the control principle in Al-Skeini was separate from Article 56. It concluded that "this Court is bound by the decision of the House of Lords in Bancoult 2 and the Convention/HRA have no application to the facts of this case".

The court added that the claimants were not "victims" for Convention purposes, being in materially the same position as the applicants in the Strasbourg case, and that decisions taken in 2016 did not interfere with any Convention right.

=== Public sector equality duty ===
For the purposes of the litigation only, the Secretary of State accepted that Chagossians were an ethnic group within the meaning of the Equality Act. He argued that the equality duty in section 149 did not apply to the resettlement decision, but the court rejected that argument: the limits on the duty were those specified by Parliament, and section 149(1)(b) and (c) applied even though the decision had effects outside Great Britain.

On the merits, the court found "an air of unreality" in the complaint, because the entire purpose of the review was to decide how to proceed in relation to the Chagossians "and no-one else". Counsel for the claimants argued that the government had not recognised the Chagossians as an ethnic group before the litigation, pointing to official documents describing them as plantation workers and their families. The court held that the papers before ministers, including an annex on the duty prepared for the March 2016 meeting, showed that the Chagossians were treated as a group defined by their origins in the islands. It concluded that the decision-making process had due regard to the matters required by section 149.

=== Rationality ===
The claimants argued that resettlement had been found feasible, that the United States had not ruled out resettlement on Diego Garcia and had no defence objection to the outer islands, and that the cost estimates were unreliable and not prohibitive. The court said it had "no hesitation" in rejecting this broad challenge. It described the decision as based on "interweaving strands in areas paradigmatically for the Government to determine", namely costs, defence and security, the creation of a new remote community, and the environment. It was "not for a court to second-guess the costings used" or to decide what level of cost should be regarded as prohibitive. Whether to press the United States further, or to use the renewal of the defence agreement as a bargaining tool, were matters for the government. The court rejected the claim that too little weight had been given to the government's moral obligation, holding that "the opportunity to right a grave historic wrong" had been "at the heart of the debate, led by the Prime Minister".

The claimants also alleged that ministers had been misled about the outer islands. Their main complaint concerned a statement at the March 2016 meeting that the largest outer island "was the size of Hyde Park which ruled out building a landing strip", when a tourism report by Whitebridge Hospitality had shown possible runway sites. The court held that, in context, what was being said was that "in real terms the building of an airstrip on the Outer Islands was not feasible", and that the Whitebridge report's runway assessment was provisional and heavily caveated. It observed that "in purely physical terms anyone with a basic knowledge of Hyde Park would understand that it was big enough for an airstrip". The court also rejected complaints about the cost of an airstrip, the description of the outer-island option as "too risky", the distance to the Maldives, and the position of the United States.

Mr Bancoult argued that ministers had not been told clearly that the support package was largely undeliverable in Mauritius while the sovereignty dispute continued, as the British High Commissioner had warned in August 2016. The court held that the government had been well aware of the risk, which was identified at all stages, and that its judgment that the package was viable was not irrational.

=== Consultation ===
Of about 9,000 Chagossians worldwide, 832 responded to the 2015 consultation; 98% of them expressed a wish to resettle, but only 25% said they were content with the conditions described as realistic. The claimants argued that ministers had been given a misleading picture of these figures, that the scenarios used were unrealistic, and that the proportion "undecided" about alternatives had been overstated. The court rejected the claim that the responses had not been conscientiously taken into account, finding that officials had tried to present ambiguous answers fairly. It held that the challenge to the consultation scenarios had been brought some 15 months too late, and that in any event the scenarios were not so outlandish that no one could reasonably have thought them realistic. It also held that the government had not been required to consult again on an outer-islands-only option, since that option had been put to consultees.

=== Support package ===
Ms Hoareau argued that a needs assessment had identified £6.6 million for Chagossians in Seychelles, and that this sum had been removed from the budget without ministers being told. The court noted that the scheme was voluntary, so that its role was "very limited". It held that "The figure of £40 million was always approximate and indicative only; it was never a finalised amount", that Chagossians in Seychelles had always been included, and that ministers had not been materially misled. The court also rejected a claim of legitimate expectation of consultation on the package, because Chagossians had been consulted on alternatives to resettlement in 2015.

=== Conclusion ===
The court dismissed both claims. It added that many grounds had been abandoned or did not raise points of law at all, and stressed:

However, judicial review is not an appeal against governmental decisions on their merits. The wisdom of governmental policy is not a matter for the courts and, in a democratic society, must be a matter for the elected government alone. ... Judicial review is not, and should not be regarded as, politics by another means.

== Court of Appeal ==
=== Grounds ===
Both claimants were given permission to appeal, but permission was refused on the equality duty, and the consultation challenge was not renewed. Mr Jaffey QC and Ms Kaufmann QC appeared for the appellants, and Sir James Eadie QC for the Secretary of State. The central issues were whether, in light of the ICJ opinion and the General Assembly resolution, the Convention extended to the islands; whether "anxious scrutiny" applied; and whether the decision was irrational.

=== ICJ advisory opinion and Resolution 73/295 ===
The appellants argued that the advisory opinion of 25 February 2019 and the General Assembly resolution of 22 May 2019 showed that a right of resettlement was a human right in customary international law, and that the obstacle in Article 56 had therefore disappeared. The court noted that the United Kingdom disagreed with the opinion and the resolution and regarded them as non-binding, and said it would express no view on the wider issues debated at the United Nations. It rejected the appellants' argument for three main reasons.

First, "whilst recognising that there was a human right relating to resettlement, neither the Advisory Opinion nor the UN Resolution actually decided anything about that right". The ICJ had left resettlement to the General Assembly, which in turn left it to be addressed during the completion of decolonisation.

Second, the right to self-determination and the right of resettlement "are, by their natures, related concepts but they are not legally synonymous". Under the opinion and the resolution, self-determination was a right of Mauritius as a state, and whether to permit resettlement would be an internal matter for the Mauritian government; "Nothing in the Advisory Opinion or UN Resolution compels Mauritius to grant resettlement rights."

Third, and "perhaps most fundamentally", neither document supported the view that the United Kingdom was not responsible for the BIOT's foreign relations for the purposes of Article 56. The court read both as "forward looking and not to put into legal jeopardy all acts of the UK in relation to the foreign relations of the BIOT". It found support for this in the ICJ's decision not to treat the breach as one of a peremptory norm, which several judges, including Judge Sebutinde and Judge Cançado Trindade, had criticised in separate opinions. It concluded: "It follows that Article 56 applies and Article 1 is excluded."

The court added that, even if the Convention applied, it was not clear that the outcome of Bancoult (No 2) would have been different, since the House of Lords had treated the common law right of abode in a way it saw as analogous to Article 8 and Article 1 of the First Protocol. It also rejected the argument that customary international law, shaped by the opinion, gave rise to a common law right of resettlement, because the Constitution Order was a legislative bar to return. It held that "the Advisory Opinion and UN Resolution do not serve to engage the ECHR and do not enlarge the common law right of abode".

=== Anxious scrutiny ===
The appellants argued that both the decision-maker and the Divisional Court should have applied "anxious scrutiny", because the decision concerned a common law right of abode and, after the ICJ opinion, a right to return. The court agreed with the Divisional Court that there was no "interference with human rights", since the 2004 Orders, upheld in Bancoult (No 2), had removed any further right to return. It added that "The Courts do not maintain any rigid classification or taxonomy of rights which is then used to govern the intensity of the scrutiny", and that the formal label would have made no difference because the Divisional Court had "looked hard" at the decision. It rejected the claim that decision-makers themselves had to apply anxious scrutiny, and held that the decision had been "taken with conspicuous care and consideration, even if the process led to a decision which Mr Bancoult and Ms Hoareau consider to be wrong".

=== Rationality ===
The court held that the Secretary of State had no legal duty to consider revoking the 2004 Orders as a freestanding issue, and that lifting the ban on return had in fact been considered as an option in 2015. Removing the permit requirement would have changed nothing on the ground, because the islands were Crown land and resettlement was only practical with government support. On the runway, the court found no basis to set aside the Divisional Court's finding, noting that Whitebridge, as tourism consultants, had never said that a runway could be built. On the support package, it upheld the findings that ministers knew of the risk to delivery in Mauritius and that the £40 million figure, covering all Chagossians including those in Seychelles, was approximate. The appeal was dismissed.

== Later treatment ==
In 2026 Chagossian claimants challenged the government's decision to transfer sovereignty over the islands to Mauritius, and the Secretary of State argued that the issues raised had been conclusively decided in this case. In R (Pompe) v Secretary of State for Foreign, Commonwealth and Development Affairs, the High Court summarised the case and its outcome in both courts. It held that arguments against the decision not to allow resettlement of the outer islands and not to return to the position of 2000 to 2004 "were conclusively decided against the claimants in Bancoult (No. 5)". On a ground of procedural fairness, it said that "the issue was determined in Bancoult No. 5 and cannot now be reopened". It noted, without deciding, an argument about the extent to which the Supreme Court in R (Marouf) v Secretary of State for Foreign, Commonwealth and Development Affairs (2023) had disapproved the Divisional Court's view on the territorial scope of the equality duty.

== See also ==
- Expulsion of the Chagossians
- Chagos Archipelago sovereignty dispute
- R v Secretary of State for Foreign and Commonwealth Affairs, ex parte Bancoult (No 2)
- R (on the application of Bancoult (No 2)) v Secretary of State for Foreign and Commonwealth Affairs
- Chagos Islanders v United Kingdom
- Legal Consequences of the Separation of the Chagos Archipelago from Mauritius in 1965

== Sources ==
=== Court decisions ===
- R (Horeau and others) v Secretary of State for Foreign and Commonwealth Affairs, EWHC (Admin) 2102 (High Court 12 August 2016).
- R (Bancoult No 2) v Secretary of State for Foreign and Commonwealth Affairs, UKSC 35 (Supreme Court 29 June 2016).
- R (Hoareau and Bancoult) v Secretary of State for Foreign and Commonwealth Affairs, EWHC (Admin) 221 (High Court (Divisional Court) 8 February 2019).
- R (Hoareau and Bancoult) v Secretary of State for Foreign and Commonwealth Affairs, EWCA Civ 1010 (Court of Appeal 30 July 2020).
- R (Pompe) v Secretary of State for Foreign, Commonwealth and Development Affairs; R (Mandarin) v Secretary of State for Foreign, Commonwealth and Development Affairs, EWHC (Admin) 529 (High Court 10 March 2026).

=== Other sources ===
- Duncan, Alan (16 November 2016). "Update on the British Indian Ocean Territory (HCWS260)". UK Parliament: Written questions, answers and statements. Statement made on behalf of Baroness Anelay, Minister of State.
