= Blackface Naija =

Nigerian singer

Blackface Naija (Blackface)
- Also known as: Blackface
- Born: Ahmedu Augustine Obiabo; Ogwule, Agatu, Benue State, Nigeria
- Origin: Ijebu-Ode, Ogun
- Genres: Dancehall, ragga, reggae, hip hop
- Occupations: Singer, songwriter, record producer
- Instrument: Guitar
- Years active: 1997–present
- Formerly of: Plantashun Boyz (defunct)

Ahmedu Augustine Obiabo (born in Ogwule, Agatu, Benue State, Nigeria), known by his stage name Blackface Naija or just Blackface, is a Nigerian dancehall, ragga, reggae singer, and songwriter. He is best known as co-writer of "African Queen" with 2Baba, a song made famous by the latter after it appeared on his debut solo album Face 2 Face in 2004 to become an international hit.

== In Plantashun Boyz ==
Blackface was a founding member of the Nigerian band Plantashun Boyz that he formed in 2000 with 2Baba and musician Chibuzor Oji (better known as Faze). Blackface and 2Baba met during his secondary education in Benue. Faze joined a brief while later in Enugu.

The band released two successful albums Body and Soul in 2000 and Sold Out in 2003. The band broke up in 2004, to be briefly reunited in 2007 for just one more album Plan B.

Although he kept sustainable relations with Faze, his rift with 2Baba widened, particularly over the rights to the song "African Queen".

== Solo career ==
After the Plantashun Boiz split up in 2004, Blackface led a solo musical career. He released the hip hop album Ghetto Child in May 2004 collaborating with several artists. The album contains "Hard Life" featuring Alabai as the first single. He also recorded a full album for his crew D Tribunal called What We Are.

After Ghetto Child, he released Evergreen, Jungle Fever, Me, Musiq and I, Dancehall Business, and the prospective Defender.

== Personal life ==
Blackface was married to Dayo for eight years and has two children. The couple agreed to separate, pending divorce procedures.
