= Face 2 Face (2Face Idibia album) =

Studio album by 2Face Idibia
- Released: 15 May 2004
- Genre: Afrobeat; R&B
- Length: 39:43
- Label: Kennis Music
- Producer: OJB Jezreel

2Face Idibia chronology
Face 2 Face (2004)	Grass 2 Grace (2006)

Singles from Face 2 Face
- 1. "Nfana Ibaga"; 2. "African Queen"; 3. "Right Here"; 4. "Ole"

Reissue cover art
- Face 2 Face 10.0 cover art

Face 2 Face is the debut solo studio album by Nigerian musician 2Face Idibia. It was released on 15 May 2004 by Kennis Music, and was a major hit, as it sold up to 2 million copies initially in Idibia's home country of Nigeria, but quickly spread through western and southern Africa, and eventually making an impact in Europe as well. Its success owed much to radio track "African Queen", a guitar ballad with elements of West African folk music and hip-hop, and rap and R&B lead single "Nfana Ibaga", which also became a local hit.

== Track listing ==
All tracks produced by OJB Jezreel.

Face 2 Face track listing
No.	Title	Writer(s)	Length
1.	"Intro (Skit)" (featuring MC Akatu)	Innocent Idibia; MC Akatu	1:06
2.	"Nfana Ibaga (No Problem)"	Idibia	4:24
3.	"Ole (Thief)" (featuring Freestyle)	Idibia; Mfon Essein	4:49
4.	"Right Here"	Idibia	4:46
5.	"Holy (Skit)"	Idibia	0:15
6.	"U No Holy Pass"	Idibia	4:54
7.	"African Queen"	Idibia; Ahmedu Augustine	4:20
8.	"Police (Skit)"	Idibia	0:24
9.	"Keep On Rockin'" (featuring Da Natives, Lil Seal)	Idibia; Agon John; Hyacinth Idibia; Lil Seal	5:43
10.	"Thank U Lord"	Idibia	4:25
11.	"Odi Ya" (featuring Blackface)	Idibia; Augustine	4:37
Total length:			39:43

South African edition bonus tracks
No.	Title	Writer(s)	Length
12.	"Right Here (MKD Remix)"	Idibia	5:00
13.	"U No Holy Pass (MKD Remix)"	Idibia	4:54
14.	"African Queen (MKD Remix)"	Idibia	4:32
15.	"Keep On Rockin' (MKD Remix)" (featuring Da Natives and Lil Seal)	Idibia; John; H. Idibia; Lil Seal	6:12
16.	"Nfana Ibaga (No Problem) (Remix)" (featuring Beenie Man and Reggie Rockstone)	Idibia; Anthony Davis; Reginald Osei	4:53
17.	"African Queen (Jazz Version)" (featuring Kunle)	Idibia	4:32
Total length:			73:15

Face 2 Face 10.0 bonus tracks
No.	Title	Writer(s)	Producer(s)	Length
12.	"Nfana Ibaga (No Problem)" (remix; featuring Beenie Man and Reggie Rockstone)	Idibia; Anthony Davis; Reginald Osei	OJB Jezreel	4:53
13.	"African Queen (US Mix)"	Idibia	OJB Jezreel	4:39
14.	"Could This Be Love"	Idibia		4:49
15.	"Home Sweet Home"	Idibia		3:15
16.	"Ghetto Life" (featuring Rocksteady and Blackface)	Idibia; Ibrahim Oboromboro; Augustine	Jiggy Jegg	4:32
17.	"Dance Go (Eau de Vie)" (with Wizkid)	Idibia; Ayodeji Balogun	Sarz	3:48
18.	"Hold On" (with Joe El)	Idibia; Joel Amadi	Hakim Abdulsamad	3:48
Total length:				69:41

== Release history ==
Region	Date	Format	Label
Nigeria	15 May 2004	CD	Kennis Music
South Africa	27 January 2006	CD	Kennis Music
