= OJB Jezreel =

Nigerian music artist (1966–2016)

OJB Jezreel.
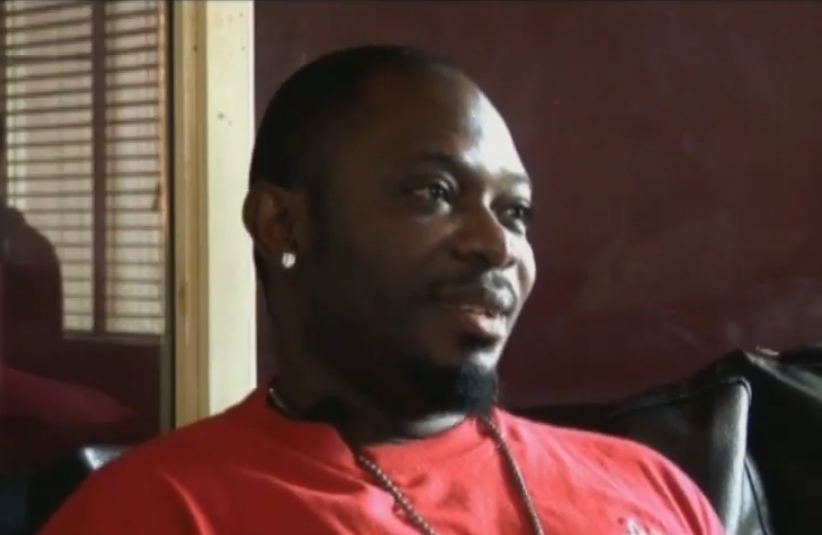
- Born: Babatunde Augustine Okungbowa; July 4, 1966; Surulere, Lagos
- Died: June 14, 2016 (aged 49); Isolo, Lagos
- Other names: Jiggaman, DJ Young, Bishop
- Children: 7 including Ayokunle Okungbowa (Ayo Jezreel)
- Musical career
- Genres: Afropop; R&B; pop
- Occupations: Musician, singer, songwriter, record producer
- Instruments: Vocals; piano; drums
- Years active: 1986-2016
- Labels: Kennis Music, Amazing Records

Babatunde Okungbowa (4 July 1966 – 14 June 2016), popularly known by his stage name OJB Jezreel or OJB, was a Nigerian singer, songwriter and record producer. He died on June 14, 2016, of kidney disease.

== Early life ==
Babatunde Okungbowa a.k.a. OJB Jezreel was born on July 4, 1966, in Lagos to Chief Anthony Okungbowa and Isabella Abiodun Okungbowa (nee Pinheiro) in a matrimony that produced 5 others. He was the last child of his mother.

He attended Yewande Memorial Primary School and Mainland Preparatory Elementary School between 1972–1977.

He graduated from Federal Government College, Ijanikin in 1986 where he organized a music concert while he was a student of the school.

OJB furthered his education at Lagos College of Education and Liter-way College, Holland, Year 1987-1990. However, in true pursuit of his passion and a real career, he decided to follow his path in life as an artiste/music producer.

The producer began his music career in 1986. He initially produced beats in small, back room studios in his Surulere neighbourhood, later expanding his work to other parts of the city.

His first son Ayokunle Okungbowa is the rising gospel artist also known as Ayo Jezreel.

== Career ==
He worked with 2face Idibia. OJB Jezreel single handedly produced 'Face 2 Face', the album that contained tracks like African Queen that took 2face Idibia to another level.

He has worked with Beenie Man, a Jamaican American-based musician.

He produced for artistes like RuggedMan re-establishing rap music to gain its ground in Nigeria. He also produced Jazzman Olofin, Weird MC, Paul Ik Dairo, Daddy Showkey, Sir Shina Peters, Olu Maintain.

OJB also produced albums and songs for Kcee, Faze, Iyanya, D'banj, Durella, Wizkid, Yemi Alade etc. to mention a few.

Songs like ‘Searching’ and ‘Pretete’ sold close to one million copies in less than 4 weeks.

== Discography ==
=== Singles ===
- "Pretete"
- "Searching"
- "Beautiful as You Are"
- "Soldier"
- "Pon Pon"
- "Shitta Anthem"
- "Gbemileke"
- "Keys to My Heart"
- "Oleku"
- "Follow Me" ft. Goody Goody
- "I Believe"
- "I Don Tire"
- "Missing You"
- "No More"
- "Malaika"
- "Dallu"
- "Wan Yoh Ma"
- "Get There"
- "What It Gonna Be"

=== Production ===
Albums

- Face 2 Face - 2face Idibia

== Personal life ==
OJB was married to three wives, Mabel, June & Korede with eight children between them.

The respected music producer and singer battled with Kidney problems since 2013. He was consequently flown to India for a transplant in 2013. With his kidney experience, he decided to set up a Foundation, ‘OJB Foundation’ to help people with kidney problems in appreciation to God for saving his life.

However, his kidney transplant failed again a week before his demise and OJB passed on. He is survived by his wife Mabel and her 3 children, June and her 3 Children Denzel, Emmanuel & Zion, and Korede and her 2 children Damilare & Ifebiyi.

OJB was buried on 8 July 2016.

== Awards ==
- Best Producer At Faith Award 2000
- Best Duo Group At Faith Award 2000
- Best Song At Faith Award 2000
- Best Pop At Faith Award 2000
- My Mic My Sway ( Recognition award for his Inspiration & Contribution to African Youth)
- NEA Honours (Nigerian Entertainment Awards) In recognition of his outstanding contributions to the Nigeria Entertainment Industry.
- Outstanding Achievers Award From Y’S Dom Of Black Kulture Inc.
- Best Music Producer, Nigeria Music Award Owerri
- Dynamic Global Concepts Award

== Filmography ==
Anjola 2015
