= R (Pompe) v Secretary of State for Foreign, Commonwealth and Development Affairs =

2026 English High Court judicial review decision on the Chagos treaty

- Court: High Court of Justice (King's Bench Division, Administrative Court)
- Full case name: The King (on the application of Bertrice Pompe) v The Secretary of State for Foreign, Commonwealth and Development Affairs; The King (on the application of Louis Michel Mandarin and Louis Misley Mandarin) v The Secretary of State for Foreign, Commonwealth and Development Affairs
- Decided: 10 March 2026
- Citation: [2026] EWHC 529 (Admin)

Case history
- Prior actions: Interim injunction granted out of hours, 22 May 2025; discharged by Chamberlain J the same day; permission refused on the papers
- Subsequent action: None reported

Court membership
- Judge sitting: Mrs Justice Stacey

Keywords
- Judicial review; royal prerogative; justiciability; duty to consult; public sector equality duty; Article 8 ECHR; Article 14 ECHR; Chagossians

R (Pompe) v Secretary of State for Foreign, Commonwealth and Development Affairs [2026] EWHC 529 (Admin) is a decision of the High Court of Justice of England and Wales on two linked claims for judicial review brought by Chagossians against the Secretary of State for Foreign, Commonwealth and Development Affairs. The claimants, Bertrice Pompe and the father and son Louis Michel Mandarin and Louis Misley Mandarin, challenged the government's failure to consult Chagossians before agreeing the 2025 treaty under which the United Kingdom accepts that Mauritius is sovereign over the Chagos Archipelago. On 22 May 2025 Pompe obtained an out-of-hours injunction which briefly delayed the signing of the treaty; it was discharged around noon that day, and the treaty was signed shortly afterwards.

On 10 March 2026 Mrs Justice Stacey refused permission for the claims to proceed and dismissed them. She held that the claims were in substance a direct challenge to the prerogative power to make treaties and were not justiciable. She also held that none of the six grounds was arguable, principally because "the Chagossians have never had any right of abode or settlement on the Islands since their ancestors were first brought there". The judge acknowledged a "long and shameful history" in the treatment of the islanders.

== Background ==
The Chagos Islands became part of the British Indian Ocean Territory (BIOT) in November 1965, after the United Kingdom agreed their detachment from Mauritius. Between 1966 and 1972 the British government relocated all Chagossians to Mauritius and Seychelles, and a United States defence facility was established on Diego Garcia. The judge recorded that the courts in England and Wales and the European Court of Human Rights "have not upheld their claimed right of abode or right of return to the Islands". In Chagos Islanders v United Kingdom (2013) the European Court of Human Rights declared a complaint inadmissible, holding among other things that descendants not born on the islands could not claim to be victims because they had never had a home there. In the litigation known as Bancoult (No. 5), the Divisional Court and the Court of Appeal dismissed challenges to the government's 2016 decision not to support resettlement.

On 3 November 2022 the Foreign Secretary announced that the United Kingdom and Mauritius would begin negotiations on the exercise of sovereignty over the territory. The Secretary of State said that he intended to "engage" with Chagossian groups as the negotiations progressed. Engagement events with Chagossian representatives were held in February 2023, later in 2023, after the October 2024 announcement, on 11 February 2025, and on 22 May 2025.

On 3 October 2024 the two governments announced a political agreement on the exercise of sovereignty over the archipelago, including Diego Garcia. The judgment records that the United Kingdom "would continue to exercise rights over Diego Garcia, for an initial period of 99 years to allow the continued operation of the defence facility there". Their joint statement said that Mauritius "will now be free to implement a programme of resettlement on the islands of the Chagos Archipelago, other than Diego Garcia", and that the United Kingdom would capitalise a trust fund for Chagossians.

The treaty was concluded on 22 May 2025 and completed the parliamentary scrutiny process under the Constitutional Reform and Governance Act 2010 on 3 July 2025. At the date of the judgment a bill to implement it was before Parliament, and the two governments intended to complete ratification once it received Royal Assent. The judge summarised its effect as follows: Mauritius is sovereign over the islands and, "in the exercise of its sovereignty", is free to resettle Chagossians on islands other than Diego Garcia but is not required to do so, while the United Kingdom continues to control Diego Garcia as a defence facility. Article 6 of the treaty provides that Mauritius "is free to implement a programme of resettlement on the islands of the Chagos Archipelago other than Diego Garcia".

== Claimants ==
The three claimants are British citizens who identify as Chagossian; each was born either in the Chagos Archipelago or in Mauritius after their family's displacement from the islands. Bertrice Pompe was born on Diego Garcia. Louis Michel Mandarin was among those displaced from the islands between 1971 and 1973, and was a claimant in the earlier group litigation Chagos Islanders v Attorney General. His son, Louis Misley Mandarin, was described by Reuters as trying, with his father, to establish a settlement on one of the islands. The judge described the elder Mr Mandarin's witness statement as giving "a chilling account of the upheaval from his family's expulsion from their homeland and their struggles in Mauritius".

== Proceedings ==
=== Injunction of 22 May 2025 ===
Pompe applied for urgent interim relief to the out-of-hours court on 21 May 2025. At 2.25 am on 22 May 2025 a temporary order was made preventing the Secretary of State from taking any conclusive or legally binding step to conclude the negotiations on a transfer of the BIOT, and from disposing of the territory, until a further hearing at 10.30 am that day. The order postponed the planned signing of the treaty. Around noon on 22 May 2025 Mr Justice Chamberlain discharged the order and gave directions for the filing of the statement of facts and grounds for the permission stage. Once the injunction had been lifted, the treaty was signed by the two countries' prime ministers shortly after noon.

=== Claims and grounds ===
The Mandarins issued their claim on 24 June 2025. Because the issues in both claims were materially identical, they were listed to be heard together. The Cabinet Office of the Prime Minister was named as an interested party in Pompe's claim. The claimants alleged that the Secretary of State's decisions, and continuing failures, were unlawful on six grounds:

1. failure to consult the Chagossian community lawfully about their interests, including resettlement, rights of abode, and territorial interests such as fishing and natural resources;
2. irrationality, in failing to consider the interests or rights of Chagossians and in making no provision for their restoration, protection or advancement;
3. breach of the public sector equality duty in section 149 of the Equality Act 2010;
4. discrimination contrary to Article 14 of the European Convention on Human Rights;
5. procedural unfairness, on the basis that fairness required a referendum or survey of Chagossians on a transfer of sovereignty and on visiting and residence rights;
6. breach of Article 8, by failing to involve Chagossians in the decision-making and to consider their private and family life.

The Secretary of State resisted the claims. He argued that, although drafted as a collateral attack, they were in fact a direct challenge to the treaty and to the bill implementing it, and that no principle allowed the court to compel the government to exercise its prerogative powers of treaty-making in a particular way. He also argued that the issues had been conclusively decided in Bancoult (No. 5).

=== Hearing ===
Permission to apply for judicial review was refused on the papers by a single judge, and the claimants renewed their application at an oral hearing. The renewal hearing took place before Mrs Justice Stacey on 28 October 2025. Philip Rule KC appeared for the claimants in both claims, with Michael Polak for Pompe and James Tumbridge for the Mandarins; Kieron Beal KC, William Irwin and John Bethell appeared for the Secretary of State.

According to PA Media, Rule argued in written submissions that the Foreign Office had made "unlawful decisions or omissions", and told the court that there had been a "reckless disregard for the Chagossian interests". Beal submitted that "no Chagossian has ever had a right of abode in the BIOT", that the question of abode or resettlement was "necessarily now a matter for Mauritius", and that the relief sought "would amount to a collateral attack on an international agreement". At the hearing the government, through Beal, reiterated its "sincere regret" about the manner in which the Chagossians had been removed.

== Judgment ==
Judgment was handed down remotely on 10 March 2026. The judge apologised for the delay, which she attributed partly to health issues and pressure of other work.

=== The Chagossians' treatment ===
The judge began her account of the facts by stating that "There is a long and shameful history to the treatment of the inhabitants of the Chagos Islands", recorded in a number of judgments in England and Wales and of the European Court of Human Rights. She noted that earlier judgments had described the Chagossians' treatment as "shameful", amounting to the "pauperisation and expulsion of the weak in the interests of the powerful". She quoted a Foreign Office memorandum of 24 August 1966 which described the islanders as "some few Tarzans or Man Fridays, whose origins are obscure". She also quoted at length from the account in Chagos Islanders v Attorney General (2003) of the poverty that most of those displaced to Mauritius experienced.

=== Threshold and justiciability ===
The question at the permission stage was whether there was an arguable ground with a realistic prospect of success, which the judge described as a low threshold. Citing the Privy Council, she said that a public body resisting permission must generally be able to "demonstrate a knockout blow in a summary way".

The parties agreed that the power to make or unmake treaties is not, absent statutory restriction, reviewable by the courts, and that foreign relations attract "an especially broad margin of discretion" if justiciable at all. The judge rejected the argument that the claims concerned only substantive public-law decision-making. She held that their focus was the treaty, and in particular the fact that it gave Mauritius a discretion, rather than an obligation, to allow resettlement. This appeared to be "a direct challenge to the foreign affairs prerogative to conclude a treaty on the terms HMG decides", and if so the Secretary of State had delivered a "knockout blow".

In the alternative, she held that the six grounds were "inextricably intertwined" with foreign policy decisions involving international political sensitivity, relations with other countries including the United States, and defence and security, so that an especially broad margin of discretion applied.

=== Consultation (ground 1) ===
On the duty to consult, the judge said:

There is no doubt that the undoubted historical injustice done to the Chagossians is a powerful background to this case, but the brutal reality is that the Chagossians have never had any right of abode or settlement on the Islands since their ancestors were first brought there.

— Stacey J, para. 36

She found it hard to see what change in circumstances the treaty brought about, and described the claim as "no more than a further attempt to re-run the arguments" dismissed in earlier litigation. Resettlement, abode and territorial interests also fell "squarely within foreign policy considerations and the subject matter of the Treaty".

She held that the ministerial statements expressed an intention to "engage", not the clear and unambiguous promise to consult needed to found a legitimate expectation. Nor did the historical injustice give rise to an exceptional common-law duty to consult on a treaty that did not change the absence of a right of abode: "Put bluntly, the Treaty does not deprive the claimants of any rights that they currently enjoy." The consultations of 2009, before the marine protected area was declared, and of 2015–16, on resettlement, were not about sovereignty and did not establish a practice of consulting on it. She concluded: "It is not arguable that there was any obligation to consult prior to the signing of the Treaty."

=== Irrationality (ground 2) ===
The claimants argued that national security, defence, cost and feasibility could no longer justify refusing resettlement of the outer islands once sovereignty was to pass to Mauritius, and that a right of abode should have been granted before any transfer. The judge held that it was a complete answer that the decision to transfer sovereignty was "a high policy question not amenable to judicial review". She added that security and defence remained important considerations, that the arguments about resettlement of the outer islands had been decided in Bancoult (No. 5), and that the wide margin of appreciation would in any event make the ground unarguable.

=== Public sector equality duty (ground 3) ===
The Secretary of State accepted, for the purposes of the litigation, that the Chagossians are a race within the meaning of section 149(7) of the Equality Act 2010. The judge did not decide whether there had been substantive compliance with the duty, or whether an equality impact assessment dated 11 March 2025 was an after-the-event document. She held that section 149 does not apply to a decision to be given effect by primary legislation, and that paragraph 14 of Schedule 18 to the Act expressly excludes decisions relating to primary legislation. "The analysis does not change, just because the Bill has not yet completed the parliamentary process." The duty therefore did not apply.

=== Articles 8 and 14 (grounds 4 and 6) ===
The claimants accepted that earlier cases had held that the Human Rights Act 1998 and the Convention do not extend to the BIOT, but argued that they could rely on Articles 8 and 14 as British citizens affected by decisions taken in the United Kingdom. The judge held that Article 14 is "a parasitic right" and could not stand alone, and that the claimants had not explained why the decisions fell within the ambit of a substantive right. The Article 8 claim failed because of the Chagossians' lack of any right of abode: "this is not a case of rights being taken away but of their never having had them". She added that she appreciated "the circularity of the argument, and the claimants' perception that an original injustice has been compounded", but held that the grounds were not arguable.

=== Procedural fairness (ground 5) ===
The claimants' counsel relied on the uniqueness of the context and history rather than on an established common-law right. The judge held that, since issues of sovereignty are not justiciable, "there is no peg on which the claimants can hang an argument for a procedurally fair decision-making process". She distinguished cases where procedural obligations had arisen because something was being taken away, since the Chagossians had no right of abode, and held that the issue had been determined in Bancoult (No. 5).

=== Disclosure and conclusion ===
The judge rejected the argument that the claims should proceed so that disclosure could be obtained, holding that a substantive hearing "would be bound to fail". In her conclusion she observed that the passing decades had not healed the claimants' sense of injustice and that their desire to return had not abated. She held that the Secretary of State had delivered "a clear knock out blow" to each element of the claims, refused permission and dismissed the claims. It was therefore unnecessary to consider the claimants' application for a costs capping order.

== Aftermath ==
Reuters reported that the claimants' lawyers said they intended to challenge the decision in the Court of Appeal. Pompe said in a statement: "How does the government sleep at night?"

== See also ==
- Expulsion of the Chagossians
- Chagos Archipelago sovereignty dispute
- Legal Consequences of the Separation of the Chagos Archipelago from Mauritius in 1965
- R (on the application of Bancoult (No 2)) v Secretary of State for Foreign and Commonwealth Affairs
- Chagos Islanders v United Kingdom
- Chagossian Government

== Sources ==
=== Court decisions ===
- R (Pompe) v Secretary of State for Foreign, Commonwealth and Development Affairs; R (Mandarin) v Secretary of State for Foreign, Commonwealth and Development Affairs, EWHC (Admin) 529 (High Court 10 March 2026).

=== Other sources ===
- Agreement between the Government of the United Kingdom of Great Britain and Northern Ireland and the Government of the Republic of Mauritius concerning the Chagos Archipelago including Diego Garcia (CS Mauritius No.1/2025, CP 1334) (Report). Foreign, Commonwealth and Development Office. 22 May 2025.
- Parke, Callum (28 October 2025). "Government made 'unlawful decisions' over Chagos Islands, High Court told". The Irish News. PA Media.
- "UK court lifts injunction, allowing Chagos Islands deal to proceed". Arab News. Reuters. 22 May 2025.
- "UK court rejects challenge to Chagos Islands deal". Business Day. Reuters. 10 March 2026.
