= Plantashun Boiz =

Nigerian hiphop and R&B music group

- Origin: Enugu, Nigeria
- Genres: R&B, Naija hip hop
- Years active: late 1990s - early/mid 2000s, 2007, 2014
- Label: Dove Records
- Past members: 2face Idibia; Faze; Blackface

Plantashun Boiz were a Nigerian hiphop and R&B music group. The group's members were 2face Idibia, Faze and Blackface.

The group was formed during their college years in Enugu, at the Institute Of Management And Technology (I.M.T Enugu), Eastern Nigeria.

The group moved down to Lagos where they gained popularity and with the inclusion of a new member, Faze, at the time it was a formidable team. It didn't take long before a chance meeting with Tony Tetuila, another Nigerian and ex-member of The Remedies, led to further exposure for the group and eventual release of their first album as Plantashun Boiz in the year 2000 produced by Nelson Brown and mixed and mastered by the popular Zeeno Foster who also later became popular from working with PLANTASHUN boiz

The group however split up after the exit of 2 Face who wanted a solo career on the platform of Kennis Music at the time. This didn't go down well with the other members of the group but they moved on and each released their individual single albums, with 2Face releasing his first and then Blackface followed by Faze. These albums were successful and Nigerians anticipated more from them even as many hoped for their reunion.

The group was managed by Owoyemi Akinwale Nathaniel (Natz), Ifeanyi Oji (Odogwu), and Obasi Leonard (Baba Leo). As a result of the Plan B reunion album, Plantashun Entertainment Ltd. Management was born in 2007. The Plan B album was distributed by T Joe.

== Former acts ==
- 2face
- Faze
- Blackface
