= Seychelles Nation =

Daily newspaper in Seychelles

- Type: Daily newspaper
- Format: Compact
- Owner: Government of Seychelles
- Publisher: National Information Services Agency (NISA)
- Editor: Patsy Canaya
- Founded: 29 June 1976 (50 years ago)
- Language: English, French, Seychellois Creole
- Headquarters: Victoria, Seychelles
- ISSN: 1607-6516
- OCLC number: 19339571
- Website: www.nation.sc

The Seychelles Nation is a daily newspaper in Seychelles. It is now considered to be the national newspaper of Seychelles and is published Mondays to Saturday by the National Information Services Agency (NISA).

== History ==
After Seychelles gained independence from Great Britain on June 29, 1976, the newspaper, then called Seychelles Bulletin, changed its name to Nation. In January 1984, the paper was renamed Seychelles Nation. On January 4, 2012, the paper's design underwent a complete overhaul.

The paper is widely distributed to government ministries, departments, businesses, airlines and hotels, as well as subscribers. It has the widest circulation in the country, of between 3500 and 4000 copies. It is distributed every day to all the main islands from its office in the center of Victoria and distribution points around Mahé.

== Format ==
The Seychelles Nation covers national, regional, sports, and international news. It is the government's mouthpiece as it carries reports on all government-related issues. It has 20 colored pages on weekdays, and the Weekend Nation, as it is called on Saturdays, has 24 pages.

The newspaper carries a selection of feature stories on specific days. These include human-interest, education, agriculture, sports, health, family and games. Letters and views from the readers on any subject and issues deemed constructive and informative are also published. Eleven pages of the newsprint is dedicated to advertisements and advertorials every day.
