= Faze (musician) =

Nigerian musician and actor

- Born: Chibuzor Oji; 1977 (age 48–49); Festac Town, Lagos State, Nigeria
- Origin: Delta State, Nigeria
- Genres: R&B; Reggae; Nigerian hip hop; Dancehall
- Occupations: Singer; songwriter; record producer; actor
- Years active: 1995–present
- Labels: Westside Records (2004–2006); Independent Entertainment (2006–present)

Chibuzor Oji (born 1977), better known by his stage name Faze, is a Nigerian musician, songwriter, and actor. He rose to prominence as a member of the Nigerian hip hop group Plantashun Boiz, alongside BlackFace Naija and 2face Idibia. Following the group's disbandment in 2004, Faze launched a solo career, releasing several studio albums that blended R&B, reggae, dancehall, and Afrobeats with an African undertone — a style he describes as "universal flavour". In 2011, he made his acting debut in the Nigerian film Alero's Symphony, for which he won the Achievement in Soundtrack award at the 8th Africa Movie Academy Awards in 2012.

== Early life ==
Chibuzor Oji was born in 1977 in Festac Town Lagos State, southwestern Nigeria. He is the fourth of nine children in his family, all of whom are said to have strong singing voices shaped by years of singing during family prayers.

faze developed an early interest in music and first gained public attention when he won the 1994 DBN Karaoke contest. He initially performed as a rapper under the name Lyrical Orge before later joining the Plantashun Boyz, upon which he adopted the stage name Faze.

== Plantashun Boyz ==
Faze joined Plantashun Boyz as a member of the trio alongside BlackFace Naija and 2face Idibia (also known as Tuface). The group released two studio albums: Body and Soul in 2000 and Sold Out in 2003. The group became one of the most prominent acts in Nigerian hip hop during this period, with 2face Idibia and Faze emerging as its most recognisable voices.

Tensions within the group grew over time, with a widely reported rivalry between Faze and 2face Idibia ultimately contributing to the group's break-up in 2004, with each member subsequently pursuing a solo career. In later years, a separate and prolonged public dispute emerged between 2Baba and BlackFace Naija; Faze was reported to have remained neutral throughout the feud, with BlackFace himself stating that Faze was not involved in their conflict.

The group briefly reunited in 2007 to release one more album, Plan B, managed by Plantashun Entertainment, a management company formed by 2face's former manager Nathaniel Akinwale Owoyemi and Faze's brother and manager Ifeanyi Oji.

== Solo career ==
=== 2004–2007: Faze Alone and Independent ===
Following the Plantashun Boyz split in 2004, Faze signed with Solomon Arueya's Westside Music Label in Lagos to record his debut solo album. Faze Alone was released in the last quarter of 2004 and achieved platinum status in Nigeria. The lead single of the same name reached number one on the music charts of prominent Nigerian radio stations including Rhythm FM, Cool FM, and Ray Power FM. Other well-received singles from the album included "Angel Gabriella", "Miss U", and "Na True". The album introduced Faze's signature vocal style, including his widely noted ability to reach the highest notes of any male artist in the Nigerian music industry at the time.

In 2006, Faze released his second studio album, Independent, through his own record label, Independent Entertainment. The album produced several hit singles including "Kpo Kpo Di Kpo", "Letter to My Brother", "Tattoo Girls", "Need Somebody", and "Kolomental", the last of which became a popular anthem in clubs across Nigeria. Also in 2006, he was named Best Vocalist at the Hip-Hop World Awards (now The Headies). The album earned him numerous award nominations across Nigeria's major music award ceremonies.

During this period, Faze recorded the single "Proud to Be African" with American rapper and musician Wyclef Jean.He also performed alongside international acts at major events including the This Day Music Festival and Star Trek concerts held in Lagos and other cities across Nigeria, sharing the stage with artists such as Beenie Man, Usher, Busta Rhymes, Akon, Beyoncé, R. Kelly, Wyclef Jean, 50 Cent, Naughty by Nature, and Genius.

=== 2008–2013: Originality, Refazed, and hiatus ===
In 2008, Faze released his third studio album, Originality. The lead single "Originality" was widely received, charting on major Nigerian radio stations and becoming one of Faze's most recognised songs. Other tracks from the album including "Am in Love" and "Spend My Money" also gained significant airplay..

In 2012, Faze released his fourth studio album, Refazed. The lead single "Am in the Mood" received extensive rotation on Nigerian radio and television stations.

In 2013, he released two additional singles, "Ifeoma" and "Lambo", both accompanied by music videos. Faze subsequently went on a creative hiatus, stepping back from the music scene for a period. He later explained the decision: "I wanted to study the type of sound being made everywhere so I can fix myself in it without deviating from my real self."

Throughout his career, Faze supported major corporate brands through music, touring all 36 states of Nigeria in partnership with Globacom at the National Globacom Campus Storm, Guinness at the Guinness Extra Smooth Discovery Shows, Sprite at the Spriteball youth talent event, and Star Lager Beer at the annual Star Trek event.

=== 2014–present: Comeback and recent work ===
In August 2014, Faze marked his return to music with the release of the single "Your Daughter", which received widespread airplay across Nigerian radio stations. He subsequently collaborated with Nigerian dancehall artist Patoranking on the single "Tonite".

In 2015, he released "Business Man" featuring Harrysong and "Common Sense". He followed these with "Wette" featuring Iyanya in 2016, and "Perfect Woman" in 2017. In 2019, he released "Your Daughter" and "Chakam". His 2020 releases included "Lovina" and "Enemy Best Friend". In 2024, he returned with the single "Automatic".

== Personal life ==
Faze has spoken publicly about maintaining a lifestyle free of alcohol, cigarettes, and drugs. In a 2023 interview, he stated: "I've never drank alcohol, smoked, or used drugs."

== Acting career ==
In 2011, Faze made his acting debut starring in the lead male role of Lovechild in the Nigerian film Alero's Symphony. He also composed and performed the film's soundtrack, for which he received the Achievement in Soundtrack award at the 8th Africa Movie Academy Awards in 2012.

== Discography ==
Adapted from AllMusic and Apple Music.

=== Studio albums ===
Year	Album	Label
2004	Faze Alone	Westside Records
2006	Independent	Independent Entertainment
2008	Originality	Independent Entertainment
2012	Refazed	Independent Entertainment

=== Singles ===
Year	Single	Notes
2013	"Ifeoma"	
2013	"Lambo"	
2015	"Business Man" (feat. Harrysong)	
2015	"Common Sense"	
2016	"Wette" (feat. Iyanya)	
2017	"Perfect Woman"	
2019	"Your Daughter"	
2019	"Chakam"	
2020	"Lovina"	
2020	"Enemy Best Friend"	
2024	"Automatic"	

== Filmography ==
Year	Film	Role	Notes	Ref
2011	Alero's Symphony	Lovechild	Acting debut	

== Awards and nominations ==
=== Won ===
Year	Award	Category	Work
2006	Hip-Hop World Awards (The Headies)	Best Vocalist	—
2008	SoundCity Awards	Best Choreography Video	"Kpo Kpo Di Kpo"
2009	Criteria Magazine Awards	Youth Motivator	—
2012	Africa Movie Academy Awards	Achievement in Soundtrack	Alero's Symphony

=== Nominations ===
Year	Award	Category	Work
2007	Channel O Awards	Best Newcomer Video	"Kolomental"
2007	AMEN Awards	Most Popular Song	"Kolomental"
2007	AMEN Awards	Best Male Vocalist	—
2007	AMEN Awards	Best R&B Male Vocal Performance	—
2007	AMEN Awards	Best R&B Album	Independent
2007	AMEN Awards	Best Song of the Year	"Kolomental"
2007	AMEN Awards	Best Album of the Year	Independent
2007	AMEN Awards	Best Act of the Year	—
2006	Nigeria Entertainment Awards	Best Male Vocalist	—
2007	Nigeria Entertainment Awards	Best R&B Album of the Year	—
2008	MOBO Awards	Best African Act	Independent
2008	Channel O Awards	Best West African Video	"Loving You Everyday"
2008	Hip-Hop World Awards	Best R&B/Pop Album of the Year	Independent
2008	Hip-Hop World Awards	Best Song of the Year	"Kolomental"
2008	Hip-Hop World Awards	Best Album of the Year	Independent
2008	Hip-Hop World Awards	Recording of the Year	"Need Somebody"
2008	Hip-Hop World Awards	Best Vocal Performance	"Someone Like Me"
2008	SoundCity Awards	Best Male Video of the Year	"Kolomental"
2008	SoundCity Awards	Best Direction Video of the Year	"Kolomental"
2008	SoundCity Awards	Best Video of the Year	"Tattoo Girls"
2008	SoundCity Awards	Best R&B Video of the Year	"Need Somebody"
2008	Futures Awards	Best Artist of the Year	—
2008	8 Fame Music Awards	Best Male Act	—
2009	Nigeria Music Video Awards	—	"Am in Love"
2012	Africa Movie Academy Awards	Achievement in Soundtrack	Alero's Symphony

== See also ==
- Plantashun Boyz
- 2Baba
- BlackFace Naija
- Africa Movie Academy Awards
