= United Nations General Assembly Resolution 2357 (XXII) =

1967 UN General Assembly resolution on 26 non-self-governing territories

UN General Assembly Resolution 2357
- Date: 19 December 1967
- Meeting no.: 1641
- Code: 2357 (XXII) (Document)
- Subject: Question of American Samoa, Antigua, Bahamas, Bermuda, British Virgin Islands, Cayman Islands, Cocos (Keeling) Islands, Dominica, Gilbert and Ellice Islands, Grenada, Guam, Mauritius, Montserrat, New Hebrides, Niue, Pitcairn, St. Helena, St. Kitts-Nevis-Anguilla, St. Lucia, St. Vincent, Seychelles, Solomon Islands, Swaziland, Tokelau Islands, Turks and Caicos Islands and the United States Virgin Islands
- Voting summary: 86 voted for; None voted against; 27 abstained
- Result: Adopted

United Nations General Assembly Resolution 2357 (XXII) is a resolution adopted by the United Nations General Assembly on 19 December 1967 on twenty-six small non-self-governing territories, among them Mauritius, Seychelles, Swaziland, Guam and the Gilbert and Ellice Islands. It reaffirmed "the inalienable right of the peoples of these Territories to self-determination and independence", urged the administering Powers to admit United Nations visiting missions, and reiterated the Assembly's declaration that any attempt to disrupt the national unity and territorial integrity of colonial territories, and the establishment of military bases and installations in them, was incompatible with the Charter of the United Nations and with resolution 1514 (XV). In doing so it reaffirmed what the Assembly had declared a year earlier in resolution 2232 (XXI).

The draft was introduced in the Fourth Committee by Tanzania on behalf of ten states and approved there by 72 votes to none, with 26 abstentions. In the plenary, at its 1641st meeting, the paragraph on territorial integrity and military bases was put to a separate recorded vote and adopted by 78 votes to 16, with 16 abstentions; the United Kingdom and the United States voted against it. The resolution as a whole was adopted by 86 votes to none, with 27 abstentions.

The resolution was one of four named in the General Assembly's 2017 request for an advisory opinion on the Chagos Archipelago, which the United Kingdom had separated from Mauritius in 1965. In its advisory opinion of 2019 the International Court of Justice grouped it with resolution 2232 as "more general in nature", relating "to the monitoring of the situation in a number of non-self-governing territories". It was adopted less than three months before Mauritius became independent on 12 March 1968. Legal commentators have counted it among the resolutions in which the Assembly condemned the detachment or affirmed the territorial integrity of non-self-governing territories, while noting that it was formally non-binding.

== Background ==
Paragraph 6 of the Declaration on the Granting of Independence to Colonial Countries and Peoples (resolution 1514 (XV) of 14 December 1960) provided that "any attempt aimed at the partial or total disruption of the national unity and the territorial integrity of a country is incompatible with the purposes and principles of the Charter of the United Nations". The Assembly monitored the declaration's implementation through the Committee of Twenty-Four, established in 1961, and adopted resolutions on the situation of individual non-self-governing territories.

On 8 November 1965 the United Kingdom created the British Indian Ocean Territory, consisting of the Chagos Archipelago, detached from Mauritius, and three island groups detached from Seychelles. The General Assembly responded with resolution 2066 (XX) of 16 December 1965 on Mauritius, and with resolution 2232 (XXI) of 20 December 1966 on a group of territories including Mauritius, which contained the paragraph on territorial integrity and military bases that resolution 2357 repeated. On 30 December 1966 the United Kingdom and the United States concluded an agreement making the British Indian Ocean Territory available for defence purposes.

In 1967 the Committee of Twenty-Four examined twenty-five of the twenty-six territories through its three sub-committees and dealt with Swaziland in its plenary meetings. On 10 May 1967 its Sub-Committee I reported that, by creating the British Indian Ocean Territory, the United Kingdom continued "to violate the territorial integrity of these Non-Self Governing Territories and to defy resolutions 2066 (XX) and 2232 (XXI) of the General Assembly". On 19 June the Committee of Twenty-Four adopted, by 17 votes to 2 with 3 abstentions, a resolution on Mauritius, Seychelles and St. Helena which "[d]eplores the dismemberment of Mauritius and Seychelles by the administering Power which violates their territorial integrity", called for the return of the detached islands, and declared the establishment of military installations in the territories a violation of resolution 2232. The United States voted against it, its representative noting that Mauritius might become independent in 1968; according to Australia, the United States and the United Kingdom had stated that neither government intended to establish military installations "on the islands in question".

In Mauritius, the parties favouring independence won the general election of 7 August 1967. On 15 December 1967 the United Kingdom told the Fourth Committee that Mauritius would become independent on 12 March 1968, after consultations with the Government of Mauritius, which had requested independence following the election.

== Drafting and adoption ==
=== Fourth Committee ===
On 23 September 1967 the General Assembly allocated the chapters of the Committee of Twenty-Four's report on specific territories to the Fourth Committee, which decided on 31 October to consider together those territories it would not consider separately, among them Mauritius, Seychelles and St. Helena. The item was debated at meetings between 15 November and 16 December 1967.

According to the Yearbook of the United Nations, several members criticised administering Powers for refusing self-determination to small territories, and Bulgaria, India, Poland and the Soviet Union drew attention to military bases in small territories, which they said contravened the Charter and Assembly resolutions. The Soviet representative said that plans had been drawn up to enlarge or build bases in places including the Seychelles, Mauritius, "the Chagos and Aldabra Islands". India welcomed the forthcoming independence of Mauritius and restated its opposition to military installations "in the artificially created British Indian Ocean Territory", recalling resolution 2066. Poland said that the final exchange of notes between the United Kingdom and the United States on the territory had taken place "almost immediately after" the adoption of resolution 2232, and that "The United Nations could legitimately demand from the administering Powers clear-cut statements with respect to their policies regarding the dismemberment of Non-Self-Governing Territories and their use for military bases." The United Kingdom described constitutional progress in the smaller territories it administered, and noted that Mauritius and Swaziland were due to become independent before the next session of the Assembly.

At the 1753rd meeting, on 15 December, the representative of Tanzania introduced draft resolution A/C.4/L.899 on behalf of Indonesia, Libya, Niger, Mali, Mauritania, Morocco, Tanzania, Upper Volta, Yugoslavia and Zambia. The next day, at the 1755th meeting, the committee adopted it by 72 votes to none, with 26 abstentions. No separate vote was taken on its paragraphs in the committee.

Several delegations explained their votes. The United States said that it had abstained and would have voted against operative paragraph 4 if it had been put separately, because "There were no provisions of the United Nations Charter that could be construed as opposing the establishment of such facilities." The Philippines voted in favour subject to its reservations on military bases, while Malaysia and Turkey, which also voted in favour, said that they would have abstained on the preambular paragraph on military bases and on operative paragraph 4. Malaysia said that those matters "were not in the purview of the Fourth Committee". Argentina supported operative paragraph 4 "in view of the importance it attached to the safeguarding of the territorial integrity of countries", while maintaining earlier reservations on the paragraphs about military bases.

Other explanations concerned the six eastern Caribbean territories that had become associated states of the United Kingdom. Jamaica and Barbados abstained, arguing that those territories should have been dealt with in a separate resolution, and Ceylon and Malaysia voted in favour with reservations on the same point. Barbados also objected that operative paragraph 2 treated independence as "a kind of universal remedy" for all non-self-governing territories, and regretted that the resolution did not mention British Honduras.

=== Plenary ===
The General Assembly considered the Fourth Committee's report (A/7013) at its 1641st plenary meeting on 19 December 1967, together with draft resolutions from the same report on Gibraltar, Ifni and Spanish Sahara, Equatorial Guinea and French Somaliland. Before the vote the New Zealand representative, who described draft resolution V as "what is commonly called the 'small Territories' resolution", commented on its application to Niue and the Tokelau Islands, for which New Zealand retained responsibility. He said that "There are no military bases or installations on those islands", that there was no threat to their territorial integrity, and that their pace of development was for the islanders to decide. The UK representative, Lord Caradon, said that his country had explained its views on all the draft resolutions in the Fourth Committee and restated its position only on Gibraltar.

At the request of a delegation, operative paragraph 4 was put to a separate recorded vote and adopted by 78 votes to 16, with 16 abstentions. The sixteen states voting against were Australia, Austria, Belgium, Canada, Denmark, Greece, Iceland, Japan, Luxembourg, the Netherlands, New Zealand, the Philippines, Portugal, Sweden, the United Kingdom and the United States; Bolivia, Brazil, China, Costa Rica, Dahomey, Finland, France, Ireland, Israel, Italy, Malawi, Malaysia, the Maldive Islands, Norway, Panama and Turkey abstained. Before the vote the President pointed out that, by approving the chapter on Swaziland, the Assembly would decide that the contributions made to the fund for the economic development of Basutoland, Bechuanaland and Swaziland would be transferred, with the donors' consent, to the United Nations Development Programme. The resolution as a whole was then adopted by a recorded vote of 86 to none, with 27 abstentions. Sierra Leone, which had announced that it would vote for draft resolutions II to V, later said that it had intended to vote in favour but that its vote had not registered.

Recorded vote in the General Assembly on resolution 2357 (XXII) as a whole, 19 December 1967
In favour (86)	Against (0)	Abstaining (27)
Afghanistan, Algeria, Argentina, Bolivia, Botswana, Brazil, Bulgaria, Burma, Burundi, Byelorussian Soviet Socialist Republic, Cambodia, Cameroon, Central African Republic, Ceylon, Chad, Chile, Colombia, Congo (Brazzaville), Congo (Democratic Republic of), Cuba, Cyprus, Czechoslovakia, Dahomey, Dominican Republic, Ecuador, Ethiopia, Gabon, Gambia, Ghana, Guatemala, Guinea, Haiti, Honduras, Hungary, India, Indonesia, Iran, Iraq, Ireland, Israel, Ivory Coast, Jordan, Kenya, Laos, Lebanon, Liberia, Libya, Madagascar, Malaysia, Mali, Mauritania, Mexico, Mongolia, Nepal, Nicaragua, Niger, Nigeria, Pakistan, Panama, Paraguay, Philippines, Poland, Romania, Rwanda, Saudi Arabia, Senegal, Singapore, Somalia, Southern Yemen, Spain, Sudan, Syria, Thailand, Tunisia, Turkey, Uganda, Ukrainian Soviet Socialist Republic, Union of Soviet Socialist Republics, United Arab Republic, United Republic of Tanzania, Upper Volta, Uruguay, Venezuela, Yemen, Yugoslavia, Zambia	–	Australia, Austria, Barbados, Belgium, Canada, China, Costa Rica, Denmark, Finland, France, Greece, Guyana, Iceland, Italy, Jamaica, Japan, Luxembourg, Malawi, Maldive Islands, Netherlands, New Zealand, Norway, Portugal, Sweden, Trinidad and Tobago, United Kingdom, United States

== Content ==
The resolution's title lists the twenty-six territories concerned: American Samoa, Antigua, the Bahamas, Bermuda, the British Virgin Islands, the Cayman Islands, the Cocos (Keeling) Islands, Dominica, the Gilbert and Ellice Islands, Grenada, Guam, Mauritius, Montserrat, the New Hebrides, Niue, Pitcairn, St. Helena, St. Kitts-Nevis-Anguilla, St. Lucia, St. Vincent, Seychelles, the Solomon Islands, Swaziland, the Tokelau Islands, the Turks and Caicos Islands and the United States Virgin Islands. Compared with resolution 2232 (XXI), the list added Swaziland.

In its preamble the Assembly recalled resolutions 1514 (XV), 1654 (XVI), 1810 (XVII), 1956 (XVIII), 2066 (XX), 2069 (XX), 2189 (XXI), 2232 (XXI) and 2288 (XXII). Unlike resolution 2232, it noted the constitutional changes introduced in February and March 1967 in Antigua, Dominica, Grenada, St. Kitts-Nevis-Anguilla and St. Lucia and envisaged for St. Vincent, and the Committee of Twenty-Four's decision that resolution 1514 (XV) and other relevant resolutions continued to apply to those territories. It declared itself deeply concerned at information in the committee's report "on the continuation of policies which aim, among other things, at the disruption of the territorial integrity of some of these Territories and at the creation by the administering Powers of military bases and installations in contravention of the relevant General Assembly resolutions". It deplored the refusal of some administering Powers to allow United Nations visiting missions, and noted "the special circumstances of geographical location and economic conditions of some of these Territories".

In the operative part, the General Assembly:

1. approved the chapters of the Committee of Twenty-Four's report on the territories;
2. reaffirmed "the inalienable right of the peoples of these Territories to self-determination and independence";
3. called on the administering Powers "to implement without delay the relevant resolutions of the General Assembly";
4. reiterated its declaration on territorial integrity and military bases (quoted below);
5. urged the administering Powers "to allow United Nations visiting missions to visit the Territories and to extend to them full co-operation and assistance";
6. decided that the United Nations should give all help to the peoples of the territories in their efforts to decide their future status freely;
7. requested the Committee of Twenty-Four to continue to pay special attention to the territories and to report on the implementation of the resolution at the Assembly's twenty-third session; and
8. requested the Secretary-General to continue to assist in implementing the resolution.

Operative paragraph 4 reads:

Reiterates its declaration that any attempt aimed at the partial or total disruption of the national unity and the territorial integrity of colonial Territories and the establishment of military bases and installations in these Territories is incompatible with the purposes and principles of the Charter of the United Nations and of General Assembly resolution 1514 (XV)

== Later resolutions ==
Mauritius became independent on 12 March 1968 and was admitted to the United Nations on 24 April 1968. (Note: The advisory opinion gives the date as 26 April 1968; resolution 2371 (XXII), admitting Mauritius, is dated 24 April 1968.) On 18 December 1968 the General Assembly adopted resolution 2430 (XXIII) on a list of twenty-four territories that no longer included Mauritius or Swaziland but still included Seychelles. It again reaffirmed the peoples' right to self-determination and independence and repeated the declaration on territorial integrity and military bases. According to the United Kingdom, questions concerning the Chagos Archipelago "were not dealt with in the Fourth Committee or in the plenary after 1967", although the British Indian Ocean Territory continued to be mentioned in connection with Seychelles until Seychelles became independent in 1976. The United States has similarly stated that, as far as it was aware, neither the Committee of Twenty-Four nor the General Assembly considered another resolution on the territory until the 2017 request for an advisory opinion. The international lawyer Zeno Crespi Reghizzi likewise noted that the General Assembly had addressed the detachment in resolutions only before Mauritius became independent in 1968, citing resolutions 2066, 2232 and 2357. Writing in 2006, before the advisory proceedings, James Crawford considered that the separation of the archipelago as the British Indian Ocean Territory, "though from time to time contested by Mauritius, appears also to have been accepted, at least as a temporary measure", comparing it with the transfer of the Cocos (Keeling) Islands to Australia, which in his view had been at least tacitly accepted by the United Nations.

== Relevance to the Chagos Archipelago ==
The resolution was considered in two separate international proceedings concerning the Chagos Archipelago: an arbitration between Mauritius and the United Kingdom under the United Nations Convention on the Law of the Sea, decided in 2015, and the advisory proceedings before the International Court of Justice, which ended in 2019.

=== Chagos Marine Protected Area arbitration (2015) ===
In its account of the background to the dispute, the arbitral tribunal in Mauritius v United Kingdom noted that "The status of Mauritius was also raised, along with that of other non-self-governing territories", in the resolutions of 20 December 1966 and 19 December 1967.

=== Request for an advisory opinion (2017) ===
In resolution 71/292 of 22 June 2017 the General Assembly recalled resolutions 2066 (XX), 2232 (XXI) and 2357 (XXII), and asked the International Court of Justice whether the decolonisation of Mauritius had been lawfully completed in 1968, "having regard to international law, including obligations reflected in" resolutions 1514 (XV), 2066 (XX), 2232 (XXI) and 2357 (XXII).

=== Positions before the International Court of Justice ===
Mauritius argued that the General Assembly "repeated the requirement to maintain the territorial integrity of Mauritius" in resolutions 2232 and 2357, and that "It is clear from these resolutions that the U.N. has regarded the Chagos Archipelago as an integral part of the territory of Mauritius." It noted that in resolution 2357 the Assembly "again expressed deep concern" about policies aimed at disrupting the territorial integrity of the territories, and that Mauritius was expressly included in the list of territories to which both resolutions applied. In its view, the language of the resolutions showed that "the firm view of the United Nations was that the Chagos Archipelago was an integral part of Mauritius for the purposes of self-determination".

The United Kingdom described resolutions 2232 and 2357 as "omnibus resolutions on 25 Territories" that expressed "deep concern" but did not create "any binding legal obligations for Member States". In its written comments it called them "recommendatory only" and their concern "of a generic nature", and pointed to the separate vote on operative paragraph 4 of resolution 2357, in which 16 states voted against and 16 abstained. The United States argued that the 27 abstentions on resolution 2357 showed that its interpretation of paragraph 6 of resolution 1514 (XV) did not represent a consensus view, and that states had "disagreed particularly sharply" over the language on territorial integrity.

=== Advisory opinion of the International Court of Justice (2019) ===
In its advisory opinion of 25 February 2019 the International Court of Justice recorded that on 19 December 1967 the General Assembly had adopted resolution 2357 (XXII) "on a number of territories including Mauritius, and reaffirmed what it had declared in resolution 2232 (XXI)". It treated resolutions 2066, 2232 and 2357 as the resolutions whose obligations it was asked to consider, distinguishing 2066, which concerned Mauritius alone, from 2232 and 2357, "which are more general in nature and relate to the monitoring of the situation in a number of non-self-governing territories", and quoting their common operative paragraph. The court held that, in inviting the United Kingdom to comply with its international obligations in decolonising Mauritius, the General Assembly "acted within the framework of the Charter and within the scope of the functions assigned to it to oversee the application of the right to self-determination", and that it had "consistently called upon administering Powers to respect the territorial integrity of non-self-governing territories". It concluded that "the obligations arising under international law and reflected in the resolutions adopted by the General Assembly during the process of decolonization of Mauritius require the United Kingdom, as the administering Power, to respect the territorial integrity of that country, including the Chagos Archipelago".

=== Separate opinions in the advisory proceedings ===
Judge Antônio Augusto Cançado Trindade listed resolutions 2232 and 2357 among the resolutions adopted "in support of the right of peoples to self-determination", noting that they reaffirmed that right for the territories concerned, including Mauritius, and reiterated the declaration on territorial integrity and military bases. Judge Julia Sebutinde counted resolution 2357, with resolutions 2066 and 2232, among the resolutions "calling for the full decolonization of Mauritius". Of the resolutions of 1966 and 1967 she wrote: "In the case of Mauritius these exhortations fell on deaf ears." She also cited paragraph 2 of resolution 2357 among resolutions describing self-determination as an "inalienable right", which in her view implied that the right had a peremptory character in the context of territorial integrity.

== Assessments ==
Writing the day after the request for an advisory opinion was adopted in June 2017, the international lawyer Marko Milanovic observed that it linked the question to numerous General Assembly resolutions "to reinforce the view that this is a multilateral issue, raising broader questions of principle which the GA has been dealing with for decades". James Summers noted that resolutions 2232 and 2357, the last two of the four resolutions cited in the request, "dealt with a number of colonial territories" but affirmed that disrupting territorial integrity and establishing military bases were incompatible with resolution 1514 (XV) and the Charter. In his view the Assembly had been "careful not to overstate the legal significance of these formally non-binding resolutions", presenting them in its request as reflecting rather than creating obligations, although there was "a notable lack of other documents" on which such obligations could be based.

Besfort Rrecaj cited the resolution, with resolutions 2066 and 2232, for the statement that the Assembly had on several occasions "condemned the detachment of the Chagos Archipelago", and Géraldine Giraudeau, Lili Song and Morsen Mosses wrote that the Assembly's resolutions on Mauritius, including resolutions 2232 and 2357, had "already pinpointed" the principle of the territorial integrity of colonial territories before the court's opinion.

On the military-bases language, Crawford, writing in general terms about United Nations practice, noted that the General Assembly had condemned the reservation of military bases in territories entitled to self-determination, but that "practice has not been particularly consistent", since the Assembly had accepted the British sovereign base areas in Cyprus.

== See also ==
- United Nations General Assembly Resolution 2066 (XX)
- United Nations General Assembly Resolution 2232 (XXI)
- Detachment of the Chagos Archipelago
- Legal Consequences of the Separation of the Chagos Archipelago from Mauritius in 1965
- Special Committee on Decolonization

== Sources ==
=== United Nations documents ===
- United Nations General Assembly (19 December 1967). Resolution 2357 (XXII). Question of American Samoa, Antigua, Bahamas, Bermuda, British Virgin Islands, Cayman Islands, Cocos (Keeling) Islands, Dominica, Gilbert and Ellice Islands, Grenada, Guam, Mauritius, Montserrat, New Hebrides, Niue, Pitcairn, St. Helena, St. Kitts-Nevis-Anguilla, St. Lucia, St. Vincent, Seychelles, Solomon Islands, Swaziland, Tokelau Islands, Turks and Caicos Islands and the United States Virgin Islands (Report). General Assembly Official Records, Twenty-second Session, Supplement No. 16 (A/6716). United Nations.
- United Nations General Assembly (24 April 1968). Resolution 2371 (XXII). Admission of Mauritius to membership in the United Nations (Report). United Nations.
- United Nations General Assembly (20 December 1966). Resolution 2232 (XXI). Question of American Samoa, Antigua, Bahamas, Bermuda, British Virgin Islands, Cayman Islands, Cocos (Keeling) Islands, Dominica, Gilbert and Ellice Islands, Grenada, Guam, Mauritius, Montserrat, New Hebrides, Niue, Pitcairn, St. Helena, St. Kitts-Nevis-Anguilla, St. Lucia, St. Vincent, Seychelles, Solomon Islands, Tokelau Islands, Turks and Caicos Islands and the United States Virgin Islands (Report). General Assembly Official Records, Twenty-first Session, Supplement No. 16 (A/6316). United Nations.
- United Nations General Assembly (18 December 1968). Resolution 2430 (XXIII). Question of American Samoa, Antigua, Bahamas, Bermuda, British Virgin Islands, Cayman Islands, Cocos (Keeling) Islands, Dominica, Gilbert and Ellice Islands, Grenada, Guam, Montserrat, New Hebrides, Niue, Pitcairn, St. Helena, St. Kitts-Nevis-Anguilla, St. Lucia, St. Vincent, Seychelles, Solomon Islands, Tokelau Islands, Turks and Caicos Islands and the United States Virgin Islands (Report). General Assembly Official Records, Twenty-third Session. United Nations.
- United Nations General Assembly, Fourth Committee (18 December 1967). Implementation of the Declaration on the Granting of Independence to Colonial Countries and Peoples: Territories not considered separately. Report of the Fourth Committee (A/7013) (Report). United Nations.
- United Nations General Assembly, Fourth Committee (14 December 1967). Official Records of the General Assembly, Twenty-second Session, Fourth Committee, 1749th meeting, 14 December 1967 (A/C.4/SR.1749) (Report). United Nations.
- United Nations General Assembly, Fourth Committee (15 December 1967). Official Records of the General Assembly, Twenty-second Session, Fourth Committee, 1751st meeting, 15 December 1967 (A/C.4/SR.1751) (Report). United Nations.
- United Nations General Assembly, Fourth Committee (15 December 1967). Official Records of the General Assembly, Twenty-second Session, Fourth Committee, 1752nd meeting, 15 December 1967 (A/C.4/SR.1752) (Report). United Nations.
- United Nations General Assembly, Fourth Committee (15 December 1967). Official Records of the General Assembly, Twenty-second Session, Fourth Committee, 1753rd meeting, 15 December 1967 (A/C.4/SR.1753) (Report). United Nations.
- United Nations General Assembly, Fourth Committee (16 December 1967). Official Records of the General Assembly, Twenty-second Session, Fourth Committee, 1755th meeting, 16 December 1967 (A/C.4/SR.1755) (Report). United Nations.
- United Nations General Assembly (19 December 1967). Official Records, Twenty-second Session, 1641st plenary meeting, 19 December 1967 (A/PV.1641) (Report). United Nations.
- United Nations Office of Public Information (1969). "The situation with regard to the implementation of the Declaration on the Granting of Independence to Colonial Countries and Peoples" (PDF). Yearbook of the United Nations 1967. New York: United Nations.

=== Court and tribunal decisions ===
- Legal Consequences of the Separation of the Chagos Archipelago from Mauritius in 1965, Advisory Opinion (PDF). I.C.J. Reports 2019. International Court of Justice. 25 February 2019. p. 95.
- Cançado Trindade, Antônio Augusto (25 February 2019). "Separate opinion of Judge Cançado Trindade" (PDF). Legal Consequences of the Separation of the Chagos Archipelago from Mauritius in 1965, Advisory Opinion. I.C.J. Reports 2019. International Court of Justice. p. 156.
- Sebutinde, Julia (25 February 2019). "Separate opinion of Judge Sebutinde" (PDF). Legal Consequences of the Separation of the Chagos Archipelago from Mauritius in 1965, Advisory Opinion. I.C.J. Reports 2019. International Court of Justice. p. 270.
- In the Matter of the Chagos Marine Protected Area Arbitration (Mauritius v. United Kingdom): Award (PDF). Permanent Court of Arbitration. 18 March 2015.

=== Pleadings ===
- Written Statement of the Republic of Mauritius (PDF). Vol. I. International Court of Justice. 1 March 2018.
- Written Statement of the United Kingdom (PDF). International Court of Justice. 15 February 2018.
- Written Comments of the United Kingdom (PDF). International Court of Justice. 15 May 2018.
- Written Statement of the United States of America (PDF). International Court of Justice. 1 March 2018.
- Counter-Memorial of the United Kingdom. Permanent Court of Arbitration. 15 July 2013.

=== Secondary sources ===
- Crawford, James (2006). The Creation of States in International Law (PDF) (2nd ed.). Oxford: Clarendon Press. ISBN 978-0-19-826002-8 – via Written Statement of the Republic of Mauritius (ICJ), vol. V, Annex 150 (extracts).
- Crespi Reghizzi, Zeno (2018). "La juridiction consultative à l'épreuve du principe consensuel: l'affaire des Effets juridiques de la séparation de l'archipel des Chagos de Maurice en 1965" [Advisory jurisdiction tested by the consensual principle: the case of the Legal Consequences of the Separation of the Chagos Archipelago from Mauritius in 1965] (PDF). Zoom-out. Questions of International Law (in French) (55): 15–34.
- Giraudeau, Géraldine; Song, Lili; Mosses, Morsen (2024). "Chagos in the South Pacific? The principle of self-determination and the France–Vanuatu dispute over the Matthew and Hunter Islands". Leiden Journal of International Law. 37 (4): 939–962. doi:10.1017/S0922156524000207.
- Milanovic, Marko (24 June 2017). "ICJ Advisory Opinion Request on the Chagos Islands". EJIL: Talk!.
- Rrecaj, Besfort T. (2020). "Legal Consequences of the Separation of the Chagos Archipelago from Mauritius in 1965 (ICJ Advisory Opinion, 25 February 2019, General List No. 169)". Utrecht Journal of International and European Law. 35 (1): 50–55. doi:10.5334/ujiel.492.
- Summers, James (2018). "Decolonisation revisited and the obligation not to divide a Non-Self-Governing Territory" (PDF). Zoom-out. Questions of International Law (55): 147–176.
