= United Nations General Assembly Resolution 2232 (XXI) =

1966 UN General Assembly resolution on 25 non-self-governing territories

UN General Assembly Resolution 2232
- Date: 20 December 1966
- Meeting no.: 1500
- Code: 2232 (XXI) (Document)
- Subject: Question of American Samoa, Antigua, Bahamas, Bermuda, British Virgin Islands, Cayman Islands, Cocos (Keeling) Islands, Dominica, Gilbert and Ellice Islands, Grenada, Guam, Mauritius, Montserrat, New Hebrides, Niue, Pitcairn, St. Helena, St. Kitts-Nevis-Anguilla, St. Lucia, St. Vincent, Seychelles, Solomon Islands, Tokelau Islands, Turks and Caicos Islands and the United States Virgin Islands
- Voting summary: 93 voted for; None voted against; 24 abstained
- Result: Adopted

United Nations General Assembly Resolution 2232 (XXI) is a resolution adopted by the United Nations General Assembly on 20 December 1966 on twenty-five non-self-governing territories, among them Mauritius, Seychelles, Bermuda, Guam and the Gilbert and Ellice Islands. It reaffirmed "the inalienable right of the peoples of these Territories to self-determination and independence", urged the administering Powers to admit United Nations visiting missions, and reiterated the Assembly's declaration that "any attempt aimed at the partial or total disruption of the national unity and the territorial integrity of colonial Territories and the establishment of military bases and installations in these Territories" was incompatible with the Charter of the United Nations and with resolution 1514 (XV).

The draft was introduced in the Fourth Committee by India on behalf of twenty-five states. In the plenary the paragraph on territorial integrity and military bases was put to a separate vote and adopted by 72 votes to 18, with 27 abstentions; the United Kingdom and the United States were among those voting against it. The resolution as a whole was adopted by 93 votes to none, with 24 abstentions.

The resolution was one of four named in the General Assembly's 2017 request for an advisory opinion on the Chagos Archipelago, which had been detached from Mauritius in 1965. In its advisory opinion of 2019 the International Court of Justice described it as "more general in nature", relating "to the monitoring of the situation in a number of non-self-governing territories". Mauritius has relied on it as confirming the territorial integrity of Mauritius, while the United Kingdom has described it as a non-binding "omnibus" resolution. Legal commentators have counted it among the resolutions in which the Assembly condemned the detachment or affirmed the territorial integrity of non-self-governing territories, while noting that it was formally non-binding.

== Background ==
On 14 December 1960 the General Assembly adopted resolution 1514 (XV), the Declaration on the Granting of Independence to Colonial Countries and Peoples. Its paragraph 6 provided that "any attempt aimed at the partial or total disruption of the national unity and the territorial integrity of a country is incompatible with the purposes and principles of the Charter of the United Nations". In 1961 the Assembly established the Committee of Twenty-Four to monitor the implementation of the declaration and make suggestions and recommendations on it. According to the International Court of Justice, it has been the Assembly's "consistent practice to adopt resolutions to pronounce on the specific situation of any non-self-governing territory".

Besides resolutions on individual territories, the Assembly dealt with a group of small territories in a single resolution. On 16 December 1965 it adopted resolution 2069 (XX) on twenty-five territories, including Seychelles but not Mauritius; it reaffirmed "the inalienable right of the people of these Territories to decide their constitutional status", called on the administering Powers to implement the Assembly's resolutions and asked them to allow United Nations visiting missions. At the same meeting the Assembly adopted resolution 2066 (XX) on Mauritius, which invited the United Kingdom "to take no action which would dismember the Territory of Mauritius and violate its territorial integrity". The United Kingdom had already established the British Indian Ocean Territory on 8 November 1965, consisting of the Chagos Archipelago, detached from Mauritius, and three island groups detached from Seychelles. According to the legal scholars Tom Frost and C. R. G. Murray, the dismemberment of these colonies to permit the creation of "foreign bases" "had attracted considerable criticism at the UN from its earliest phases".

In 1966 the Committee of Twenty-Four again examined the small territories. At the General Assembly's request of 20 December 1965 it paid particular attention to them, and it reported that, although their small size and population and their limited resources raised particular problems, the provisions of the Declaration were fully applicable to them. With regard to a few of these territories the committee expressed deep concern at reports of preparations to use them for military purposes and at the administering Power's lack of respect for their territorial integrity, and it again stressed the importance of United Nations visiting missions. On 27 September 1966 its Sub-Committee I reported that the United Kingdom had not only failed to implement resolution 1514 (XV) in Mauritius, Seychelles and St. Helena, "but has also violated the territorial integrity of two of them by creating a new territory, the British Indian Ocean Territory, composed of islands detached from Mauritius and Seychelles".

== Drafting and adoption ==
=== Fourth Committee ===
On 24 September 1966 the General Assembly allocated the chapters of the Committee of Twenty-Four's report on specific territories to the Fourth Committee. On 10 November the Fourth Committee decided to consider together the chapters on the territories it would not consider separately, among them the chapter on Mauritius, Seychelles and St. Helena. It discussed the item at eight meetings between 13 and 17 December 1966.

According to the Yearbook of the United Nations, Iran observed during the debate that, because of the special circumstances of small territories, independence might not always be the appropriate solution, and that their peoples should be able to decide their future status freely, in full knowledge of options such as integration, free association and federation, with visiting missions and United Nations supervision. Bulgaria, India, Yugoslavia and the Soviet Union urged the administering Powers to admit visiting missions and, with the United Arab Republic, called for the removal of the military bases maintained in the small territories. The United States regretted that the Committee of Twenty-Four had deleted from its sub-committees' reports the references to resolution 1541 (XV), which set out the options open to territories in deciding their form of self-government.

At the 1679th meeting, on 17 December 1966, the Indian representative introduced draft resolution A/C.4/L.866 on behalf of twenty-five sponsors. (Note: The sponsors were Algeria, Burundi, the Democratic Republic of the Congo, Ethiopia, Ghana, India, Indonesia, Iraq, Kenya, Kuwait, Libya, Mali, Mauritania, Pakistan, Saudi Arabia, Sierra Leone, Somalia, Sudan, Syria, Uganda, the United Arab Republic, the United Republic of Tanzania, Yemen, Yugoslavia and Zambia.) According to the summary record, he regretted that the territories were being considered as the committee was about to end its work, and described the draft as "moderate and well balanced". He explained that operative paragraph 4 was important in the light of information in the Committee of Twenty-Four's report, and that "The question of Mauritius was a case in point: in violation of the General Assembly's decisions, a new Territory had been formed with some of the islands of that group and a military base was to be established there".

The Philippines supported the aim of self-determination and independence for the twenty-five territories but had reservations about military bases. Its representative said that bases in non-self-governing territories should be condemned only when there was "incontrovertible evidence that those bases were being used to stifle the legitimate aspirations of the inhabitants", and that there was no such evidence for any of the twenty-five territories. At his request the committee voted separately, by roll call, on the phrase in the fourth preambular paragraph referring to the creation of military bases, which was retained by 48 votes to 11, with 23 abstentions. He then withdrew his request for a separate vote on operative paragraph 4, while placing on record "his delegation's firm opposition to that part of the text". The draft as a whole was adopted by a roll-call vote of 62 to none, with 21 abstentions, including Australia, New Zealand, the United Kingdom and the United States.

=== Plenary ===
The General Assembly considered the Fourth Committee's report (A/6628) at its 1500th plenary meeting on 20 December 1966, together with a draft resolution on Gibraltar from the same report. A separate recorded vote was requested on operative paragraph 4, which was adopted by 72 votes to 18, with 27 abstentions. The resolution as a whole was then adopted by a recorded vote of 93 to none, with 24 abstentions. The Philippines voted against operative paragraph 4 but in favour of the resolution as a whole.

Recorded vote in the General Assembly on operative paragraph 4, 20 December 1966
In favour (72)	Against (18)	Abstaining (27)
Afghanistan, Albania, Algeria, Bulgaria, Burma, Burundi, Byelorussian Soviet Socialist Republic, Cambodia, Cameroon, Central African Republic, Ceylon, Chad, Chile, Colombia, Congo (Brazzaville), Congo (Democratic Republic of), Cuba, Cyprus, Czechoslovakia, Dahomey, Ethiopia, Gabon, Ghana, Guinea, Honduras, Hungary, India, Indonesia, Iraq, Jamaica, Jordan, Kenya, Kuwait, Lebanon, Lesotho, Liberia, Libya, Malawi, Malaysia, Mali, Mauritania, Mexico, Mongolia, Morocco, Nepal, Niger, Nigeria, Pakistan, Panama, Poland, Romania, Rwanda, Saudi Arabia, Senegal, Sierra Leone, Singapore, Somalia, Spain, Sudan, Syria, Togo, Trinidad and Tobago, Tunisia, Uganda, Ukrainian Soviet Socialist Republic, Union of Soviet Socialist Republics, United Arab Republic, United Republic of Tanzania, Upper Volta, Yemen, Yugoslavia, Zambia	Australia, Belgium, Canada, Denmark, France, Greece, Iceland, Japan, Luxembourg, Netherlands, New Zealand, Norway, Philippines, Portugal, South Africa, Sweden, United Kingdom, United States	Argentina, Austria, Bolivia, Brazil, China, Costa Rica, Dominican Republic, Ecuador, El Salvador, Finland, Guatemala, Haiti, Iran, Ireland, Israel, Italy, Ivory Coast, Laos, Madagascar, Maldive Islands, Nicaragua, Paraguay, Peru, Thailand, Turkey, Uruguay, Venezuela

In the vote on the resolution as a whole, the 24 abstaining states were Australia, Austria, Belgium, Canada, Denmark, the Dominican Republic, Finland, France, Greece, Iceland, Italy, Japan, Luxembourg, the Maldive Islands, the Netherlands, New Zealand, Nicaragua, Norway, Portugal, South Africa, Sweden, Thailand, the United Kingdom and the United States.

== Content ==
The resolution's title lists the twenty-five territories concerned: American Samoa, Antigua, the Bahamas, Bermuda, the British Virgin Islands, the Cayman Islands, the Cocos (Keeling) Islands, Dominica, the Gilbert and Ellice Islands, Grenada, Guam, Mauritius, Montserrat, the New Hebrides, Niue, Pitcairn, St. Helena, St. Kitts-Nevis-Anguilla, St. Lucia, St. Vincent, Seychelles, the Solomon Islands, the Tokelau Islands, the Turks and Caicos Islands and the United States Virgin Islands.

In its preamble the General Assembly recalled resolutions 1514 (XV), 1654 (XVI), 1810 (XVII), 1956 (XVIII), 2066 (XX), 2069 (XX) and 2189 (XXI). It declared itself deeply concerned at information in the Committee of Twenty-Four's report "on the continuation of policies which aim, among other things, at the disruption of the territorial integrity of some of these Territories and at the creation by the administering Powers of military bases and installations in contravention of the relevant resolutions of the General Assembly". It deplored the refusal of some administering Powers to allow United Nations visiting missions, and noted "the special circumstances of geographical location and economic conditions concerning some of these Territories".

In the operative part, the General Assembly:

1. approved the chapters of the Committee of Twenty-Four's report on the territories;
2. reaffirmed "the inalienable right of the peoples of these Territories to self-determination and independence";
3. called on the administering Powers "to implement without delay the relevant resolutions of the General Assembly";
4. reiterated its declaration on territorial integrity and military bases (quoted below);
5. urged the administering Powers "to allow United Nations visiting missions to visit the Territories, and to extend to them full co-operation and assistance";
6. decided that the United Nations should give all help to the peoples of the territories in their efforts to decide their future status freely;
7. requested the Committee of Twenty-Four "to continue to pay special attention to these Territories and to report on the implementation of the present resolution" at the Assembly's twenty-second session; and
8. requested the Secretary-General to continue to assist in implementing the resolution.

Operative paragraph 4 reads:

Reiterates its declaration that any attempt aimed at the partial or total disruption of the national unity and the territorial integrity of colonial Territories and the establishment of military bases and installations in these Territories is incompatible with the purposes and principles of the Charter of the United Nations and of General Assembly resolution 1514 (XV)

== Positions of states ==
In the Fourth Committee the representative of Australia said that he had received no instructions and would abstain. After the vote the British delegate said that "several parts of the resolution were unacceptable", but that he had abstained because there had been no time to study the draft and he lacked instructions. Turkey explained its abstention by reservations on the operative part. Iran, which had abstained in the vote on the preambular phrase on military bases, said that the reference to foreign military bases was in keeping with its own policy of forbidding them on its territory, but that it regarded the question as one of security, outside the committee's competence. Argentina regretted that the territories had been left until the end of the committee's work, leaving no time to discuss them properly.

In a written explanation of vote included in the plenary record, the United States said that it shared the resolution's main objectives but had reservations about the parts of the fourth preambular paragraph and operative paragraph 4 concerning military installations. It stated: "My delegation knows of nothing in the United Nations Charter which in any way abridges the right of a Member nation to establish and maintain military installations deemed essential for security." It added that the question of military bases had been discussed in the First Committee at the same session and referred to the Eighteen-Nation Committee on Disarmament.

== Follow-up ==
On 10 May 1967 Sub-Committee I of the Committee of Twenty-Four reported that, by creating the British Indian Ocean Territory, the United Kingdom "continues to violate the territorial integrity of these Non-Self Governing Territories and to defy resolutions 2066 (XX) and 2232 (XXI) of the General Assembly". In June 1967 the Committee of Twenty-Four adopted a resolution on Mauritius which deplored "the dismemberment of Mauritius and Seychelles by the administering Power which violates their territorial integrity, in contravention of General Assembly resolutions 2066 (XX) and 2232 (XXI)", and called on the United Kingdom to return the detached islands.

On 19 December 1967 the General Assembly adopted resolution 2357 (XXII) on the same group of territories with the addition of Swaziland. It recalled resolution 2232 and repeated its declaration on territorial integrity and military bases. That paragraph was again put to a separate vote, with 16 votes against and 16 abstentions; the resolution as a whole was adopted by 86 votes to none, with 27 abstentions.

== Relevance to the Chagos Archipelago ==
The resolution was considered in two separate international proceedings concerning the Chagos Archipelago: an arbitration between Mauritius and the United Kingdom under the United Nations Convention on the Law of the Sea, decided in 2015, and the advisory proceedings before the International Court of Justice, which ended in 2019.

=== Background ===
Ten days after the resolution was adopted, on 30 December 1966, the United Kingdom and the United States concluded the agreement making the British Indian Ocean Territory available for their defence purposes. Mauritius became independent on 12 March 1968 without the archipelago.

=== Chagos Marine Protected Area arbitration (2015) ===
In its account of the background to the dispute, the arbitral tribunal in Mauritius v United Kingdom noted that "The status of Mauritius was also raised, along with that of other non-self-governing territories", in the resolutions of 20 December 1966 and 19 December 1967.

=== Request for an advisory opinion (2017) ===
In resolution 71/292 of 22 June 2017 the General Assembly recalled resolutions 2066 (XX), 2232 (XXI) and 2357 (XXII), and asked the International Court of Justice whether the decolonisation of Mauritius had been lawfully completed in 1968, "having regard to international law, including obligations reflected in" resolutions 1514 (XV), 2066 (XX), 2232 (XXI) and 2357 (XXII).

=== Positions before the International Court of Justice ===
Mauritius argued that the General Assembly "repeated the requirement to maintain the territorial integrity of Mauritius" in resolutions 2232 and 2357, and that "It is clear from these resolutions that the U.N. has regarded the Chagos Archipelago as an integral part of the territory of Mauritius." It pointed out that Mauritius was expressly included in the list of territories to which both resolutions applied.

The United Kingdom described resolutions 2232 and 2357 as "omnibus resolutions on 25 Territories expressing "deep concern", but not creating any binding legal obligations for Member States". In the earlier arbitration it had described resolution 2232 as "an omnibus resolution dealing with some 25 Territories administered by various States". In its written comments to the court it argued that the resolutions were "recommendatory only", that their concern was "of a generic nature", and that "If there had been a legal right to territorial integrity of non-self-governing territories in 1966-1967, the General Assembly would have referred to the breach of such a right." It also relied on the separate votes, in which 18 states voted against paragraph 4 in 1966 and 16 in 1967. The United States argued similarly that the votes on resolutions 2066, 2232 and 2357, with eighteen, twenty-four and twenty-seven abstentions respectively, showed that the interpretation of paragraph 6 of resolution 1514 (XV) did not represent a consensus view, and that states had "disagreed particularly sharply" over the language on territorial integrity.

=== Advisory opinion of the International Court of Justice (2019) ===
In its advisory opinion of 25 February 2019 the International Court of Justice recorded that resolution 2232 (XXI) had been adopted "on a number of territories including Mauritius" and quoted operative paragraph 4. It distinguished resolution 2066 (XX), which concerned Mauritius alone, from resolutions 2232 (XXI) and 2357 (XXII), "which are more general in nature and relate to the monitoring of the situation in a number of non-self-governing territories". It observed that the General Assembly "has consistently called upon administering Powers to respect the territorial integrity of non-self-governing territories, especially after the adoption of resolution 1514 (XV)". The court concluded that "the obligations arising under international law and reflected in the resolutions adopted by the General Assembly during the process of decolonization of Mauritius require the United Kingdom, as the administering Power, to respect the territorial integrity of that country, including the Chagos Archipelago".

=== Separate opinions in the advisory proceedings ===
In his declaration, Judge Ronny Abraham noted that in the resolutions it adopted between 1966 and 1974 the General Assembly "consistently referred to the "territorial integrity" of colonial entities", but generally by tying it to national unity and, frequently, "to the condemnation of the establishment by administering Powers of military bases", citing resolution 2232 as an example. In his view the adoption of these resolutions "does not, in my view, indicate that States espoused an absolutist conception" of territorial integrity that would preclude partitioning a colonial territory in accordance with the freely expressed will of the populations concerned.

Judge Antônio Augusto Cançado Trindade listed resolutions 2232 and 2357 among the resolutions adopted "in support of the right of peoples to self-determination", noting that they reaffirmed that right for the territories concerned, including Mauritius. Judge Julia Sebutinde counted them, with resolution 2066, among the resolutions "calling for the full decolonization of Mauritius", and wrote of the resolutions of 1966 and 1967 that "In the case of Mauritius these exhortations fell on deaf ears."

== Assessments ==
Writing the day after the request for an advisory opinion was adopted in June 2017, the international lawyer Marko Milanovic observed that it linked the question to numerous General Assembly resolutions "to reinforce the view that this is a multilateral issue, raising broader questions of principle which the GA has been dealing with for decades". James Summers noted that resolutions 2232 and 2357, the last two of the four resolutions cited in the request, "dealt with a number of colonial territories" but affirmed that disrupting territorial integrity and establishing military bases were incompatible with resolution 1514 (XV) and the Charter. In his view the Assembly had been "careful not to overstate the legal significance of these formally non-binding resolutions", presenting them in its request as reflecting rather than creating obligations, although there was "a notable lack of other documents" on which such obligations could be based.

Besfort Rrecaj cited the resolution, with resolutions 2066 and 2357, for the statement that the Assembly had on several occasions "condemned the detachment of the Chagos Archipelago", and Géraldine Giraudeau, Lili Song and Morsen Mosses wrote that the Assembly's resolutions on Mauritius, including resolutions 2232 and 2357, had "already pinpointed" the principle of the territorial integrity of colonial territories before the court's opinion. Summarising the opinion in the American Journal of International Law, Diane Marie Amann quoted the resolution's declaration on territorial integrity and military bases as part of the "backdrop of actions by international bodies" against which the events surrounding the detachment had unfolded.

On the military-bases language, James Crawford, writing in general terms about United Nations practice, noted that the General Assembly had condemned the reservation of military bases in territories entitled to self-determination, but that "practice has not been particularly consistent", since the Assembly had accepted the British sovereign base areas in Cyprus.

== See also ==
- United Nations General Assembly Resolution 2066 (XX)
- Detachment of the Chagos Archipelago
- Legal Consequences of the Separation of the Chagos Archipelago from Mauritius in 1965
- Special Committee on Decolonization

== Sources ==
=== United Nations documents ===
- United Nations General Assembly (20 December 1966). Resolution 2232 (XXI). Question of American Samoa, Antigua, Bahamas, Bermuda, British Virgin Islands, Cayman Islands, Cocos (Keeling) Islands, Dominica, Gilbert and Ellice Islands, Grenada, Guam, Mauritius, Montserrat, New Hebrides, Niue, Pitcairn, St. Helena, St. Kitts-Nevis-Anguilla, St. Lucia, St. Vincent, Seychelles, Solomon Islands, Tokelau Islands, Turks and Caicos Islands and the United States Virgin Islands (Report). General Assembly Official Records, Twenty-first Session, Supplement No. 16 (A/6316). United Nations.
- United Nations General Assembly (16 December 1965). Resolution 2069 (XX). Question of American Samoa, Antigua, Bahamas, Barbados, Bermuda, British Virgin Islands, Cayman Islands, Cocos (Keeling) Islands, Dominica, Gilbert and Ellice Islands, Grenada, Guam, Montserrat, New Hebrides, Niue, Papua, Pitcairn, St. Helena, St. Kitts-Nevis-Anguilla, St. Lucia, St. Vincent, Seychelles, Solomon Islands, Tokelau Islands, Turks and Caicos Islands and the United States Virgin Islands (Report). General Assembly Official Records, Twentieth Session, Supplement No. 14 (A/6014). United Nations.
- United Nations General Assembly (19 December 1967). Resolution 2357 (XXII). Question of American Samoa, Antigua, Bahamas, Bermuda, British Virgin Islands, Cayman Islands, Cocos (Keeling) Islands, Dominica, Gilbert and Ellice Islands, Grenada, Guam, Mauritius, Montserrat, New Hebrides, Niue, Pitcairn, St. Helena, St. Kitts-Nevis-Anguilla, St. Lucia, St. Vincent, Seychelles, Solomon Islands, Swaziland, Tokelau Islands, Turks and Caicos Islands and the United States Virgin Islands (Report). General Assembly Official Records, Twenty-second Session, Supplement No. 16 (A/6716). United Nations.
- United Nations General Assembly, Fourth Committee (19 December 1966). Implementation of the Declaration on the Granting of Independence to Colonial Countries and Peoples: Territories not considered separately. Report of the Fourth Committee (A/6628) (Report). United Nations.
- United Nations General Assembly, Fourth Committee (17 December 1966). Official Records of the General Assembly, Twenty-first Session, Fourth Committee, 1679th meeting, 17 December 1966 (A/C.4/SR.1679) (Report). United Nations.
- United Nations General Assembly (20 December 1966). Official Records, Twenty-first Session, 1500th plenary meeting, 20 December 1966 (A/PV.1500) (Report). United Nations.
- United Nations Office of Public Information (1968). "The situation with regard to the implementation of the Declaration on the Granting of Independence to Colonial Countries and Peoples" (PDF). Yearbook of the United Nations 1966. New York: United Nations.

=== Court and tribunal decisions ===
- Legal Consequences of the Separation of the Chagos Archipelago from Mauritius in 1965, Advisory Opinion (PDF). I.C.J. Reports 2019. International Court of Justice. 25 February 2019. p. 95.
- Abraham, Ronny (25 February 2019). "Declaration of Judge Abraham" (PDF). Legal Consequences of the Separation of the Chagos Archipelago from Mauritius in 1965, Advisory Opinion. I.C.J. Reports 2019. International Court of Justice. p. 153.
- Cançado Trindade, Antônio Augusto (25 February 2019). "Separate opinion of Judge Cançado Trindade" (PDF). Legal Consequences of the Separation of the Chagos Archipelago from Mauritius in 1965, Advisory Opinion. I.C.J. Reports 2019. International Court of Justice. p. 156.
- Sebutinde, Julia (25 February 2019). "Separate opinion of Judge Sebutinde" (PDF). Legal Consequences of the Separation of the Chagos Archipelago from Mauritius in 1965, Advisory Opinion. I.C.J. Reports 2019. International Court of Justice. p. 270.
- In the Matter of the Chagos Marine Protected Area Arbitration (Mauritius v. United Kingdom): Award (PDF). Permanent Court of Arbitration. 18 March 2015.

=== Pleadings ===
- Written Statement of the Republic of Mauritius (PDF). Vol. I. International Court of Justice. 1 March 2018.
- Written Statement of the United Kingdom (PDF). International Court of Justice. 15 February 2018.
- Written Comments of the United Kingdom (PDF). International Court of Justice. 15 May 2018.
- Written Statement of the United States of America (PDF). International Court of Justice. 1 March 2018.
- Counter-Memorial of the United Kingdom. Permanent Court of Arbitration. 15 July 2013.

=== Secondary sources ===
- Amann, Diane Marie (October 2019). "Legal Consequences of the Separation of the Chagos Archipelago from Mauritius in 1965". American Journal of International Law. 113 (4): 784–791. doi:10.1017/ajil.2019.50.
- Crawford, James (2006). The Creation of States in International Law (PDF) (2nd ed.). Oxford: Clarendon Press. ISBN 978-0-19-826002-8 – via Written Statement of the Republic of Mauritius (ICJ), vol. V, Annex 150 (extracts).
- Frost, Tom; Murray, C. R. G. (2015). "The Chagos Islands cases: the empire strikes back". Northern Ireland Legal Quarterly. 66 (3): 263–287. doi:10.53386/nilq.v66i3.153.
- Giraudeau, Géraldine; Song, Lili; Mosses, Morsen (2024). "Chagos in the South Pacific? The principle of self-determination and the France–Vanuatu dispute over the Matthew and Hunter Islands". Leiden Journal of International Law. 37 (4): 939–962. doi:10.1017/S0922156524000207.
- Milanovic, Marko (24 June 2017). "ICJ Advisory Opinion Request on the Chagos Islands". EJIL: Talk!.
- Rrecaj, Besfort T. (2020). "Legal Consequences of the Separation of the Chagos Archipelago from Mauritius in 1965 (ICJ Advisory Opinion, 25 February 2019, General List No. 169)". Utrecht Journal of International and European Law. 35 (1): 50–55. doi:10.5334/ujiel.492.
- Summers, James (2018). "Decolonisation revisited and the obligation not to divide a Non-Self-Governing Territory" (PDF). Zoom-out. Questions of International Law (55): 147–176.
