= United Nations General Assembly Resolution 73/295 =

2019 UN General Assembly resolution on the ICJ advisory opinion on the Chagos Archipelago

UN General Assembly Resolution 73/295
- Date: 22 May 2019
- Meeting no.: 83
- Code: A/RES/73/295 (Document)
- Subject: Advisory opinion of the International Court of Justice on the legal consequences of the separation of the Chagos Archipelago from Mauritius in 1965
- Voting summary: 116 voted for; 6 voted against; 56 abstained
- Result: Adopted

United Nations General Assembly Resolution 73/295 is a resolution adopted by the United Nations General Assembly on 22 May 2019 in response to the advisory opinion of the International Court of Justice (ICJ) on the Chagos Archipelago. The resolution welcomed the opinion. It affirmed that "the Chagos Archipelago forms an integral part of the territory of Mauritius", and demanded that the United Kingdom "withdraw its colonial administration from the Chagos Archipelago unconditionally within a period of no more than six months". It also called on the United Nations, its specialised agencies and other international organisations not to recognise or give effect to measures taken by or on behalf of the "British Indian Ocean Territory".

The draft was introduced by Senegal on behalf of the African Group and adopted by a recorded vote of 116 to 6, with 56 abstentions. The United Kingdom, the United States, Australia, Hungary, Israel and the Maldives voted against. The six-month period ended on 22 November 2019 without the United Kingdom withdrawing. In 2021 a special chamber of the International Tribunal for the Law of the Sea relied in part on the resolution in treating Mauritius as the coastal state for the archipelago. In October 2024 the United Kingdom and Mauritius announced a political agreement under which the United Kingdom would accept Mauritian sovereignty over the archipelago, and a treaty was signed on 22 May 2025.

== Background ==
By resolution 71/292 of 22 June 2017, the general assembly asked the ICJ for an advisory opinion on two questions. The first was whether the decolonisation of Mauritius had been lawfully completed in 1968, following the separation of the archipelago. The second was what consequences under international law arose from the United Kingdom's continued administration of it. The resolution was adopted by 94 votes to 15, with 65 abstentions.

The court delivered its opinion on 25 February 2019. It found that the decolonisation of Mauritius "was not lawfully completed when that country acceded to independence in 1968, following the separation of the Chagos Archipelago". It also found that the United Kingdom was "under an obligation to bring to an end its administration of the Chagos Archipelago as rapidly as possible", and that all member states were under an obligation to co-operate with the United Nations to complete the decolonisation of Mauritius. The court held that "the modalities necessary for ensuring the completion of the decolonization of Mauritius fall within the remit of the United Nations General Assembly". It added that "it is for the General Assembly to pronounce on the modalities", while all member states "must co-operate with the United Nations to put those modalities into effect". Some participants in the proceedings had argued that the United Kingdom must end its administration immediately; a few considered that the time frame was a matter for bilateral negotiations between Mauritius and the United Kingdom. The secretary-general transmitted the opinion to the Assembly as document A/73/773.

== Content ==
The preamble recalls resolution 71/292 and quotes its two questions. It then sets out four findings of the court: that decolonisation was not lawfully completed; that the United Kingdom must end its administration "as rapidly as possible"; that all member states must co-operate with the United Nations; and that resettlement of Mauritian nationals, "including those of Chagossian origin", was a human rights issue for the general assembly to address. It reaffirms "the responsibility of the United Nations, in accordance with resolution 1514 (XV), to assist in the process of decolonization of Mauritius".

The operative part contains eight paragraphs. In them the general assembly:

1. welcomes the advisory opinion of 25 February 2019;
2. affirms, "in accordance with the advisory opinion of the Court", that:
  - the decolonisation of Mauritius has not been lawfully completed, because the detachment "was not based on the free and genuine expression of the will of the people of Mauritius";
  - "the Chagos Archipelago forms an integral part of the territory of Mauritius";
  - the United Kingdom's continued administration "constitutes a wrongful act entailing the international responsibility of that State";
  - the United Kingdom must end its administration "as rapidly as possible";
  - all member states must co-operate with the United Nations to complete the decolonisation of Mauritius, because respect for self-determination is an obligation erga omnes; and
  - the resettlement of Mauritian nationals, including those of Chagossian origin, "must be addressed as a matter of urgency";
3. demands that the United Kingdom "withdraw its colonial administration from the Chagos Archipelago unconditionally within a period of no more than six months from the adoption of the present resolution";
4. urges the United Kingdom to co-operate with Mauritius in facilitating resettlement and "to pose no impediment or obstacle to such resettlement";
5. calls on all member states to co-operate with the United Nations to complete the decolonisation of Mauritius, and to refrain from any action that would impede or delay it;
6. calls on the United Nations and its specialised agencies to recognise that the archipelago forms an integral part of Mauritius, and to refrain from "recognizing, or giving effect to any measure taken by or on behalf of, the 'British Indian Ocean Territory'";
7. makes the same call to "all other international, regional and intergovernmental organizations, including those established by treaty"; and
8. asks the secretary-general to report at the 74th session on the resolution's implementation.

=== Relationship to the advisory opinion ===
Paragraphs 1, 2, 4 and 5 restate findings and wording of the opinion. Paragraphs 3, 6 and 7 go further: the six-month time limit, and the calls on the United Nations and other organisations, are not in the opinion. The opinion found that "at the time of its detachment from Mauritius in 1965, the Chagos Archipelago was clearly an integral part of that non-self-governing territory". Mauritius' Prime Minister argued that the operative paragraphs incorporated "the actual language of the International Court of Justice". He said that, because the court had left the modalities to the Assembly, the draft set a six-month limit, which was "more than sufficient time" to end an administration of "no more than a handful of personnel". The United States replied that the court "did not say that today Mauritius is sovereign over the British Indian Ocean Territory, or suggest that States or international organizations must recognize it as such", and that it had "rejected Mauritius's argument that the transfer of sovereignty must be immediate".

== Debate ==
The draft resolution (A/73/L.84/Rev.1) was considered under agenda item 88 at the 83rd plenary meeting of the 73rd session on the morning of 22 May 2019, chaired by the president of the general assembly, María Fernanda Espinosa. Argentina, Bolivia, Cuba, Nicaragua, Syria, Vanuatu and Venezuela joined the African states as sponsors. The draft had been revised before the meeting. The British representative said that "the majority of the problems with it remain".

=== Supporters ===
Introducing the draft, the Senegalese representative, Cheikh Niang, said that it was "not only a faithful reflection of the advisory opinion" but "a request for the implementation of the Court's findings". He urged member states to vote for it "in order to help Africa overcome the traumas of a painful colonial past". Venezuela, speaking for the 120 members of the Non-Aligned Movement, supported the draft.

The prime minister of Mauritius, Pravind Jugnauth, addressed the Assembly in person. He said that the opinion was "clear and unambiguous and leaves no room for any doubt or other interpretation". He also said that Mauritius had offered the United Kingdom to work on a joint draft resolution. He said that "it feels as if we are back in 1965", when the excision "was carried out under duress and was presented to the United Nations as a fait accompli". Responding to the argument that the opinion was not binding, he said that it was "an authoritative statement of the law" which, although it "cannot impose a new legal obligation", could "recognize and confirm" existing ones. He described the eviction of the Chagossians as "a very dark episode of human history, akin to a crime against humanity". He said that Mauritius was prepared to enter into "a long-term arrangement with the United States, or with the United Kingdom and the United States", permitting "the unhindered operation of the defence facility". He called on states to adopt the draft "by an even greater margin than resolution 71/292".

Cyprus argued that "a genuine willingness to part with a parcel of one's territory is a myth" and that "an element of coercion is always present when a parcel of colonial territory is excised". Seychelles recalled that Aldabra, Farquhar and Desroches, formerly part of the British Indian Ocean Territory, had been returned to it, and said that "the same precedent should be applied in the case of Mauritius". India's representative, Syed Akbaruddin, noted that the court had held that the questions were located "in the broader frame of reference of decolonization". He said that Indian Ocean security was "a separate matter" on which the governments concerned should reach "a mutually agreeable understanding". Other states that voted in favour also spoke; their reasons are summarised below.

=== Opponents ===
The British permanent representative, Karen Pierce, said that the territory "has been under continuous British sovereignty since 1814" and "has never been part of the Republic of Mauritius". She said that in 1965 the Mauritian Council of Ministers "freely entered into an agreement to detach" it in return for a range of benefits, including a commitment "to cede the Territory ... when it is no longer needed for defence purposes". She expressed "sincere regret about the manner in which Chagossians were removed", but said that the United Kingdom had decided against resettlement "on the grounds of feasibility, defence, security interests and cost". She rejected "unconditionally" the allegation of crimes against humanity. She gave three reasons for opposing the draft:

- the issue was "a bilateral sovereignty dispute", and adopting the draft would "create a difficult precedent";
- the draft "goes beyond the advisory opinion", in particular by setting a six-month deadline and calling on states and international organisations to act; and
- advisory opinions "are not legally binding". She argued that this one had not taken account of the 2015 Mauritius v United Kingdom award, which had held the 1965 undertakings binding, or of the treaty obligation with the United States "to maintain British sovereignty ... until at least 2036".

She invited states that did not wish to vote against to abstain.

The American representative, Jonathan Cohen, said that the United States "unequivocally supports the sovereignty of the United Kingdom" over the territory, whose status "is essential to the value of the joint United States-United Kingdom base". He said that the draft set "an unsettling precedent" and undermined the principle "that States must consent to have their disputes adjudicated".

The Maldives said that it had "always supported" decolonisation. It argued, however, that the draft "prejudges the implications" of its 2010 submission to the Commission on the Limits of the Continental Shelf, which Mauritius had opposed. In a right of reply, Mauritius said that the Maldivian claim "clearly overlapped with our potential exclusive economic zone", and that the Maldives had not responded to an invitation to further talks.

== Vote ==
The draft was adopted by a recorded vote of 116 to 6, with 56 abstentions. (Note: The draft resolution was submitted by Senegal "on behalf of the States Members of the United Nations that are members of the Group of African States". Argentina, Bolivia, Cuba, Nicaragua, Syria, Vanuatu and Venezuela were added as sponsors on the day of the vote. Of the 54 members of the African Group, Morocco abstained and Liberia did not vote.) (Note: The meeting record lists the 178 states that voted. The 15 states shown as not voting are the other members of the United Nations, which had 193 members at the time. Iran, which is among them, made a statement on the resolution at the afternoon meeting.)

Recorded vote on draft resolution A/73/L.84/Rev.1, 22 May 2019
In favour (116) sponsors marked †	Abstaining (56)	Against (6)	Did not vote (15)
Algeria†; Angola†; Antigua and Barbuda; Argentina†; Austria; Azerbaijan; Bahamas; Bangladesh; Belarus; Belize; Benin†; Bhutan; Bolivia (Plurinational State of)† Botswana†; Brazil; Burkina Faso†; Burundi†; Cabo Verde†; Cambodia; Cameroon†; Central African Republic†; Chad†; China; Comoros†; Congo†; Costa Rica; Côte d'Ivoire†; Cuba†; Cyprus; North Korea; Democratic Republic of the Congo†; Djibouti†; Dominican Republic; Ecuador; Egypt†; Equatorial Guinea†; Eritrea†; Eswatini†; Ethiopia†; Finland; Gabon†; Gambia†; Ghana†; Greece; Grenada; Guatemala; Guinea†; Guinea-Bissau†; Guyana; Iceland; India; Indonesia; Ireland; Jamaica; Kazakhstan; Kenya†; Lao People's Democratic Republic; Lesotho† / Libya†; Liechtenstein; Madagascar†; Malawi†; Malaysia; Mali†; Marshall Islands; Mauritania†; Mauritius†; Mexico; Monaco; Mozambique†; Myanmar; Namibia†; Nauru; Nepal; Nicaragua†; Niger†; Nigeria†; Norway; Pakistan; Palau; Paraguay; Peru; Russian Federation; Rwanda†; Saint Kitts and Nevis; Saint Vincent and the Grenadines; Sao Tome and Principe†; Saudi Arabia; Senegal†; Serbia; Seychelles†; Sierra Leone†; Singapore; Solomon Islands; Somalia†; South Africa†; South Sudan†; Spain; Sudan†; Suriname; Sweden; Switzerland; Syrian Arab Republic†; Thailand; Togo†; Tunisia†; Uganda†; United Arab Emirates; United Republic of Tanzania†; Uruguay; Vanuatu†; Venezuela (Bolivarian Republic of)† Viet Nam; Yemen; Zambia†; Zimbabwe†	Afghanistan; Albania; Andorra; Armenia; Bahrain; Barbados; Belgium; Bosnia and Herzegovina; Brunei Darussalam; Bulgaria; Canada; Chile; Colombia; Croatia; Czech Republic; Denmark; El Salvador; Estonia; Fiji; France; Germany; Honduras; Italy; Japan; Kuwait; Kyrgyzstan; Latvia; Lithuania; Luxembourg; Malta; Micronesia (Federated States of); Mongolia; Montenegro; Morocco†; Netherlands; New Zealand; North Macedonia; Oman; Panama; Papua New Guinea; Philippines; Poland; Portugal; Qatar; South Korea; Romania; Saint Lucia; Samoa; San Marino; Slovakia; Slovenia; Sri Lanka; Timor-Leste; Trinidad and Tobago; Turkey; Tuvalu	Australia; Hungary; Israel; Maldives; United Kingdom of Great Britain and Northern Ireland; United States of America	Dominica; Georgia; Haiti; Iran (Islamic Republic of); Iraq; Jordan; Kiribati; Lebanon; Liberia†; Republic of Moldova; Tajikistan; Tonga; Turkmenistan; Ukraine; Uzbekistan

Of the fifteen states that had voted against resolution 71/292 in 2017, nine abstained in 2019: Afghanistan, Albania, Bulgaria, Croatia, Japan, Lithuania, Montenegro, New Zealand and South Korea. China, Indonesia, Mexico, Russia, Spain and Sweden, which had abstained in 2017, voted in favour.

=== Explanations of vote ===
Explanations of vote after the voting began at the 83rd meeting and continued at the 84th meeting that afternoon. Speaking after the vote, the British representative said that "a significant number of Member States share those concerns, as witnessed by the high number of abstentions and absences".

Among the states that voted against:

- Australia said that the General Assembly "should not seek to act on the Court's non-binding advisory opinion as if it were otherwise", and that "an arbitrary six-month time frame is manifestly unreasonable".
- Israel said that the resolution "goes even further than the advisory opinion" and used language "both inaccurate and inconsistent with the General Assembly's general mandate".

Several states that abstained objected chiefly to the time limit and to the operative demands:

- El Salvador had voted for resolution 71/292. It said that paragraphs 3, 6 and 7 were "not consistent with an advisory opinion of the Court", and that the resolution was therefore "a declaration of a purely political nature".
- Colombia said that it did not consider it "appropriate to demand an obligation through a General Assembly resolution based on a non-legally-binding instrument".
- New Zealand said that insufficient time had been allowed for dialogue and that "the six-month time frame ... is not reasonable".
- Chile said that advisory opinions "are not binding on States" and that "it does not therefore follow that the General Assembly can use a resolution to order the implementation of the Court's conclusions".
- Portugal, which abstained, said that it had "never challenged a decision of the Court" and agreed that all member states were obliged to co-operate with the United Nations to complete the decolonisation of Mauritius.
- Japan, Canada and Turkey called for dialogue between the parties; Turkey said that bilateral sovereignty disputes should not be referred to the court "without the clear consent of both parties concerned".

Several states that voted in favour qualified their support:

- Sweden, speaking also for Finland, said that "the matter of the time limit is best resolved through consultations and cooperation between the United Kingdom and Mauritius".
- Singapore urged the parties to resolve their differences "as rapidly as possible, but without any artificial deadlines".
- China said that "this principle of consent of the countries concern [sic] must be effectively maintained".
- Liechtenstein said that it was "ultimately incumbent on Mauritius" to ensure respect for the Chagossians' human rights, and that a clearer commitment to that effect "would have been an important element strengthening the resolution".

=== Reasons given by states voting in favour ===
Besides Senegal, Mauritius, Cyprus, Seychelles and India (see above) and the qualified explanations of Sweden and Finland, Singapore, China and Liechtenstein, the following states that voted in favour explained their position.

In the debate at the 83rd meeting:

- Venezuela, speaking for the Non-Aligned Movement, recalled the movement's 2018 position that the archipelago, "including the island of Diego Garcia", had been illegally detached in violation of resolutions 1514 (XV) and 2066 (XX) and was "an integral part of the territory of the Republic of Mauritius".
- Nicaragua said that "no pretext, no matter how benign it is intended to be, including supposed global security, can override the erga omnes obligation" to complete decolonisation.
- Syria, a late sponsor, said that the security reasons invoked by the United Kingdom were "based on an old colonial mentality that is unacceptable today".
- Argentina spoke of its solidarity with a country that, "like ours, continues to be a victim of colonialism", recalled that it had voted for resolutions 2066 (XX), 2232 (XXI) and 2357 (XXII), and called the advisory opinion and the draft "a victory for international law".
- Namibia cited its acceptance of the ICJ's 1999 judgment in favour of Botswana in the Kasikili/Sedudu Island case as an example of respect for the court, and said that the continued British administration was "an injustice that must be righted".
- South Africa referred to its own experience of colonialism and apartheid, including forced removals, and said that "the effects of colonization continue long after a State has obtained its independence".
- Egypt, then chair of the African Union, based its support on self-determination, the need "to end all forms of colonization on the African continent", and support for the court's advisory role.
- Botswana, which had taken part in the ICJ hearings, said that it "fully supports the advisory opinion" and listed its main findings.
- Mexico stressed the value of the court's advisory function and called the debate and the draft "a further example of the contribution of the United Nations to strengthening the rule of law".
- Lesotho recalled the African Union's 2017 decision and said that the opinion "was with respect to the completion of decolonization, and not about security or official development assistance".
- Uruguay described the principles of resolution 1514 (XV) as jus cogens norms and cited its commitment to multilateralism and to the ICJ.
- Madagascar said that the general assembly had "an essential responsibility to ensure the complete decolonization of Mauritius".
- Zimbabwe called the opinion "an authoritative pronouncement of international law that all Members of the United Nations must respect", and said that failing to support it "would be legitimizing colonialism".

In explanations of vote at the 84th meeting:

- Russia said that the general assembly had no mandate to decide the status of a territory and that the court's advisory jurisdiction did not apply to bilateral disputes, but that because the request "fell within the framework of the decolonization process", the resolution was "also a decolonization issue for which the General Assembly has a special responsibility".
- The United Arab Emirates said that it would prefer bilateral disputes to be resolved by the parties and was aware of British and American security interests, but "felt compelled to vote in favour" out of respect for sovereignty, territorial integrity and self-determination. It also raised its own dispute with Iran over Abu Musa and the Greater and Lesser Tunbs.
- Austria said that its vote was "not a vote for or against a Member State but is one in favour of the International Court of Justice".
- Switzerland said that the court's advisory opinions "must be carefully studied", and that the resolution encouraged "a shared constructive solution within the framework of international law".
- Thailand based its vote on the purposes and principles of the Charter and hoped that the United Kingdom and Mauritius would resolve the issue "amicably".
- Costa Rica cited the human rights of the Chagossians, who "were forcibly expelled and prevented from returning", and said that it did not believe that "the existence of a military base on a territory is conducive to the preservation of peace and security".
- Indonesia said that it "fully recognizes the sovereignty of Mauritius over the Chagos archipelago", cited the principle of territorial integrity, and said that the resolution would "not set the new precedent of taking bilateral issues to multilateral forums".

== Implementation ==
=== Expiry of the time limit ===
The six-month period set by paragraph 3 ended on 22 November 2019. Mauritius said that it was "deeply disappointed at the failure of the United Kingdom to withdraw its colonial administration" by that date. In February 2020 the Assembly of the African Union expressed "deep concern" at the United Kingdom's failure to respect the resolution. The Non-Aligned Movement summit in Baku in October 2019, the Group of 77 foreign ministers in September 2019 and the African, Caribbean and Pacific Group of States in December 2019 also adopted texts supporting the decolonisation of Mauritius or urging compliance with the resolution.

=== Secretary-general's report ===
The secretary-general's report under paragraph 8, dated 18 May 2020, reproduced the replies of governments and UN bodies. In its reply, the United Kingdom said that the resolution "does not and cannot create any legal obligations for States Members of the United Nations", and that the process of decolonisation of Mauritius "was lawfully complete" in 1968. The United States said that the resolution reflected "a troubling mischaracterization of the effect of the Court's opinion". Argentina said that it recognised Mauritian sovereignty over the archipelago and "will therefore not recognize any unilateral measures that might be taken by the colonial Power".

The report recorded the first responses of UN bodies:

- the secretariat informed UN entities of the resolution and asked them "to review and, as necessary, adjust any relevant practices";
- the Food and Agriculture Organization reported that at the June 2019 session of the Indian Ocean Tuna Commission, Mauritius had asked for the United Kingdom's membership as a coastal state to be terminated. The chair had concluded that the commission "would need to abide by the Resolution", but deferred the matter to a later session;
- the Universal Postal Union said that it had "taken due note" of the resolution and would refer the matter to its governing bodies; and
- the secretary-general observed that "the designation of the Chagos Archipelago has been modified on the maps produced by the Secretariat, in line with resolution 73/295".

=== Mauritius/Maldives case ===
On 28 January 2021 a special chamber of the International Tribunal for the Law of the Sea found that it had jurisdiction in the maritime boundary case brought by Mauritius against the Maldives, and that Mauritius' claim was admissible. Referring to resolution 73/295, the chamber said that "the fact that the time-limit set by the General Assembly has passed without the United Kingdom complying with this demand further strengthens" its finding that the British claim to sovereignty was "contrary to the authoritative determinations made in the advisory opinion". It concluded that Mauritius could be regarded as the coastal state for the archipelago, which was consistent with "the determinations made in the Chagos advisory opinion which were acted upon by UNGA resolution 73/295".

=== UK–Mauritius agreement ===
On 3 October 2024 the two governments announced "an historic political agreement on the exercise of sovereignty over the Chagos Archipelago". Under it, the United Kingdom would agree that Mauritius is sovereign over the archipelago, including Diego Garcia, while being authorised to exercise Mauritius' sovereign rights over Diego Garcia for an initial period of 99 years. The agreement was signed at London and Port Louis on 22 May 2025. Article 1 provides that "Mauritius is sovereign over the Chagos Archipelago in its entirety, including Diego Garcia". Article 6 provides that Mauritius "is free to implement a programme of resettlement on the islands of the Chagos Archipelago other than Diego Garcia".

== See also ==
- United Nations General Assembly Resolution 2066 (XX)
- United Nations General Assembly Resolution 71/292
- Chagos Archipelago sovereignty dispute
- Detachment of the Chagos Archipelago

== Sources ==
- Legal Consequences of the Separation of the Chagos Archipelago from Mauritius in 1965, Advisory Opinion (PDF). I.C.J. Reports 2019. International Court of Justice. 25 February 2019.
- "Special Chamber finds that it has jurisdiction to adjudicate upon the dispute concerning the delimitation of the maritime boundary and that Mauritius' claim in this regard is admissible (ITLOS/Press 313)" (PDF) (Press release). International Tribunal for the Law of the Sea. 28 January 2021.
- United Nations General Assembly (22 June 2017). Official Records, Seventy-first session, 88th plenary meeting, Thursday, 22 June 2017 (A/71/PV.88) (Report). United Nations.
- United Nations General Assembly (17 May 2019). Senegal: revised draft resolution (A/73/L.84/Rev.1) (Report). United Nations.
- United Nations General Assembly (22 May 2019). Senegal: revised draft resolution. Addendum (A/73/L.84/Rev.1/Add.1) (Report). United Nations.
- United Nations General Assembly (22 May 2019). Official Records, Seventy-third session, 83rd plenary meeting, Wednesday, 22 May 2019, 10 a.m. (A/73/PV.83) (Report). United Nations.
- United Nations General Assembly (22 May 2019). Official Records, Seventy-third session, 84th plenary meeting, Wednesday, 22 May 2019, 3 p.m. (A/73/PV.84) (Report). United Nations.
- United Nations General Assembly (24 May 2019). Resolution adopted by the General Assembly on 22 May 2019: 73/295. Advisory opinion of the International Court of Justice on the legal consequences of the separation of the Chagos Archipelago from Mauritius in 1965 (A/RES/73/295) (Report). United Nations.
- United Nations Secretary-General (18 May 2020). Advisory opinion of the International Court of Justice on the legal consequences of the separation of the Chagos Archipelago from Mauritius in 1965: Report of the Secretary-General (A/74/834) (Report). United Nations.
- Agreement between the Government of the United Kingdom of Great Britain and Northern Ireland and the Government of the Republic of Mauritius concerning the Chagos Archipelago including Diego Garcia (CS Mauritius No.1/2025, CP 1334) (Report). Foreign, Commonwealth and Development Office. 22 May 2025.
- "UK and Mauritius joint statement, 3 October 2024" (Press release). Foreign, Commonwealth and Development Office. 3 October 2024.
