= Nouwen =

Nouwen is a surname. Notable people with the surname include:

- Aniek Nouwen (born 1999), Dutch football player
- Henri Nouwen (1932–1996), Dutch Catholic priest and theologian
- Ronny Nouwen (born 1982), Dutch football player
- Sarah Nouwen, Dutch legal scholar
