= Dapo Akande =

British academic (born 1973)

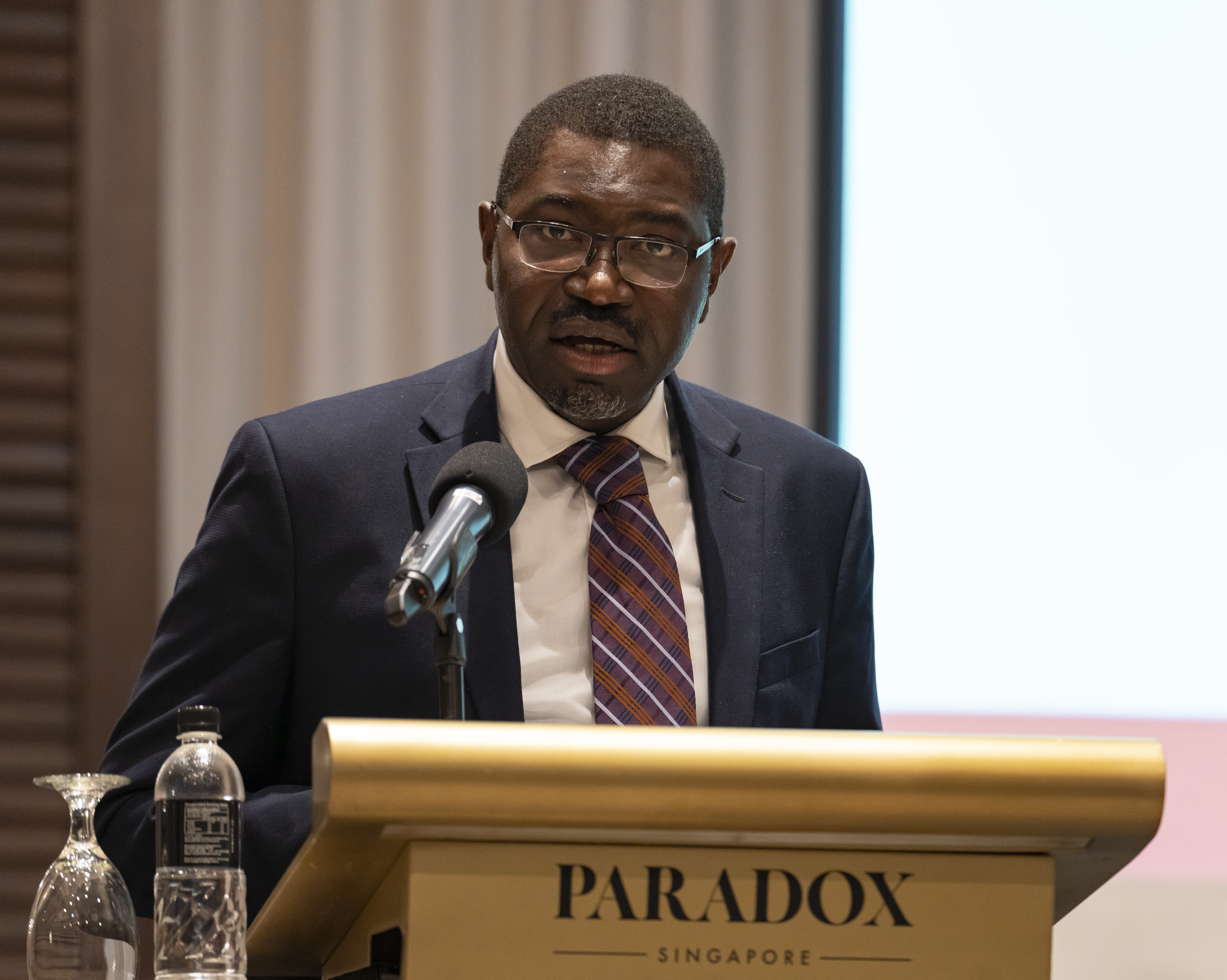
- Dapo Akande speaking in Singapore in 2022
- Born: June 1973 (age 53)
- Title: Chichele Professor of International Law

Academic background
- Education: University of Oxford; London School of Economics; Nigerian Law School; Obafemi Awolowo University

Academic work
- Institutions: Blavatnik School of Government; All Souls College, Oxford

Dapo Akande is a British-Nigerian academic and lawyer. Akande is the Chichele Professor of Public International Law at the University of Oxford, a Fellow of All Souls College, Oxford and co-director of the Oxford Institute for Ethics, Law and Armed Conflict (ELAC). From February 2027 he will be a Judge at the International Court of Justice after being elected in November 2026. Akande was the first Black professor to be honoured with a portrait at St Peter's College, Oxford. Akande is a founding editor of EJIL:Talk!, the scholarly blog of the European Journal of International Law.

In November 2021, Akande was elected to the United Nations International Law Commission for the term 2023–2027 at the 76th session of the United Nations General Assembly. He was co-nominated by the United Kingdom, Japan, Kenya, Slovenia and Nigeria making him the first candidate to be nominated by countries from four United Nations regional groups in the history of the International Law Commission.

In September 2024, the UK Government declared its intention to nominate Akande for election as a judge to the International Court of Justice for the term 2027 - 2035. In November 2026 he was elected to the International Court of Justice for a nine-year term beginning on 6 February 2027 after receiving 11 votes from the Security Council.

== Education ==
Akande graduated with a Bachelor of Laws (LLB) from Obafemi Awolowo University (formerly the University of Ife) in 1992. In 1993, he qualified as a barrister and solicitor from the Nigerian Law School. Akande was awarded a Master of Laws (LLM) from the London School of Economics and Political Science in 1994, and was awarded a Master of Arts (MA) by resolution from the University of Oxford in 2004.

== Academic career ==
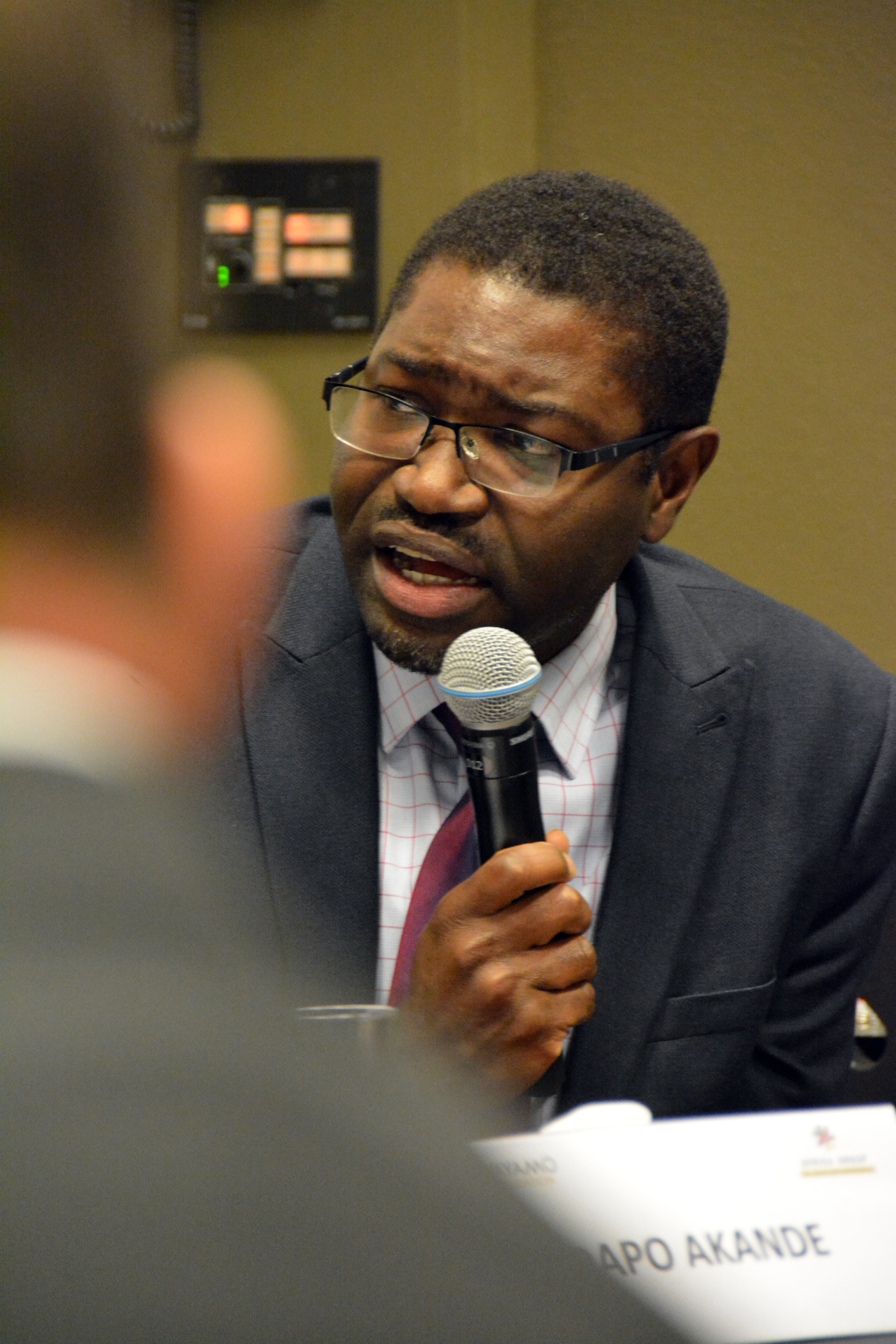
Akande in 2018

Since 2004, Akande has lectured in Public International Law at the University of Oxford. Prior to that, Akande taught law at Durham University (2000–2004), University of Nottingham (1998–2000), University of Cambridge (1996–1998) and at the London School of Economics and Political Science (1994–1998). Akande has also held numerous international visiting professorships and lectureships.

Akande sits on the board of several legal journals and scholarly organisations, including the American Journal of International Law, Israel Law Review, Nigerian Yearbook of International Law, Ethiopian Yearbook of International Law and the African Journal of International and Comparative Law.

== International legal career ==
Akande has engaged in advisory work for numerous national governments and international organizations on matters of international law.

He has advised and assisted counsel or provided expert opinions in cases before the International Criminal Court, International Court of Justice, the International Tribunal for the Law of the Sea, the United Nations Human Rights Committee, the African Court on Human and Peoples' Rights, the European Court of Human Rights, the World Trade Organization and international trade and arbitral tribunals. He has advised the African Union, the Commonwealth Secretariat, Council of Europe, the Association of South East Asian Nations (ASEAN), the International Committee of the Red Cross and NATO.

Akande has also addressed the United Nations Security Council and the United Nations Human Rights Council.

Akande has provided training on international law to lawyers, diplomats, military officers and other government officials, including officials from the UK Foreign, Commonwealth and Development Office and Royal Navy, the Government of Denmark, the Government of Sudan, and leaders from the Asia-Pacific Region.

In September 2024, the UK Government declared its intention to nominate Akande for election as a judge to the International Court of Justice for the term 2027 - 2035. An article in The Telegraph noted Akande was nominated despite his support for Mauritius against the UK, in a 2019 ICJ case on the sovereignty of the Chagos Archipelago.

== Domestic legal career ==
Akande is a Member of Essex Court Chambers, London. He has also acted as an advisor in cases before the UK national courts, including the UK Supreme Court and advised the UK Parliament's All Party Parliamentary Group on Drones.

== Prizes and awards ==
- Honorary Doctor of Civil Law (DCL), Durham University (July 2025).
- Ambassador’s Commendation, Government of Japan for his outstanding contribution to the progressive development of international law and support for Japan’s efforts in strengthening the rule of law (2024).
- Certificate of Merit for high technical craftsmanship and utility to practicing lawyers and scholars, American Society of International Law (2019).
- Premio Regione Toscana Giorgio La Pira Prize (Prize for the Best Paper Authored by a Young Scholar) for his article in the Journal of International Criminal Justice on the “Jurisdiction of the International Criminal Court over Nationals of Non-Parties: Legal Basis and Limits” (2003).
- Junior Award of the International Affairs Sub-Committee of the Gilbert Murray Trust (1995).

== Publications ==
Akande has written or co-authored more than sixty publications on a wide range of international legal topics. His books include:

- Welsh; Akande; Rodin (2023). The Individualisation of War: Ethics, Law and Politics. Oxford University Press. ISBN 9780192872203.
- Saul; Akande (2020). Oxford Guide to International Humanitarian Law. Oxford University Press. ISBN 9780198855309.
- Akande; Kuosmanen; McDermott; Roser (2020). Human Rights and 21st Century Challenges: Poverty, Conflict and the Environment. Oxford University Press. ISBN 9780198824770.
- Akande; Higgins; Webb; Sivakumaran; Sloan (2017). Oppenheim's International Law: The United Nations. Oxford University Press. ISBN 9780198808312.
- International Group of Experts (2017). Tallinn Manual 2.0 on the International Law Applicable to Cyber Operations. Cambridge University Press. ISBN 9781316822524.
- Murray; Akande; Garraway; Hampson; Lubell; Wilmshurst (2016). Practitioner's Guide to Human Rights in Armed Conflict. Oxford University Press. ISBN 9780198791393.
- Cassese; Akande (2009). Oxford Companion to International Criminal Law and Justice. Oxford University Press. ISBN 9780199238323.
