= United Nations General Assembly Resolution 2066 (XX) =

1965 UN General Assembly resolution on Mauritius

UN General Assembly Resolution 2066
- Date: 16 December 1965
- Meeting no.: 1398
- Code: 2066 (XX) (Document)
- Subject: Question of Mauritius
- Voting summary: 89 voted for; None voted against; 18 abstained
- Result: Adopted

United Nations General Assembly Resolution 2066 (XX), entitled "Question of Mauritius", is a resolution adopted by the United Nations General Assembly on 16 December 1965. It noted "with deep concern" that any step taken by the United Kingdom, as the administering power, to detach islands from the colony of Mauritius in order to establish a military base would contravene the Declaration on the Granting of Independence to Colonial Countries and Peoples (resolution 1514 (XV)), and invited the United Kingdom "to take no action which would dismember the Territory of Mauritius and violate its territorial integrity". It was adopted by 89 votes to none, with 18 abstentions, including the United Kingdom.

The resolution was adopted five weeks after the United Kingdom had separated the Chagos Archipelago from Mauritius on 8 November 1965 to form the British Indian Ocean Territory. It was the only one of the four resolutions named in the general assembly's 2017 request for an advisory opinion from the International Court of Justice to deal specifically with Mauritius. The governments of Mauritius and the United Kingdom have disputed its legal significance; the International Court of Justice treated it as reflecting the United Kingdom's obligation to respect the territorial integrity of Mauritius. Legal commentators have counted it among the General Assembly resolutions that criticised or condemned the detachment of the archipelago.

== Background ==
On 14 December 1960 the general assembly adopted resolution 1514 (XV), the Declaration on the Granting of Independence to Colonial Countries and Peoples. Its paragraph 6 provided that "any attempt aimed at the partial or total disruption of the national unity and the territorial integrity of a country is incompatible with the purposes and principles of the Charter of the United Nations". In 1961 the Assembly established the Special Committee on Decolonization (the "Committee of Twenty-Four") to monitor the declaration's implementation. In its report for 1964 the committee stated that the constitution of Mauritius did not allow the representatives of the people "to exercise real legislative or executive powers, and that authority is nearly all concentrated in the hands of the United Kingdom Government and its representatives". The committee recommended that the administering power immediately convene a fully representative conference to draft a constitution for Mauritius and set an early date for its independence, and in 1965 the Assembly considered the question of Mauritius on the basis of the committee's recommendations.

Following talks between the United Kingdom and the United States on defence facilities in the Indian Ocean, and an agreement in principle by Mauritian ministers at the September 1965 constitutional conference in London, the United Kingdom established the British Indian Ocean Territory by Order in Council on 8 November 1965. The new colony consisted of the Chagos Archipelago, detached from Mauritius, and the islands of Aldabra, Farquhar and Desroches, detached from Seychelles.

British officials expected the step to be challenged at the United Nations. On 8 November 1965 the UK permanent representative, Lord Caradon, warned London that an argument against "the alleged breach of paragraph 6 of resolution 1514 (XV) involved in detachment" was "likely to attract wide support", and proposed replying that the islands had been administered under Mauritius and Seychelles "only for convenience" and that paragraph 6 was therefore irrelevant. On 16 November the United Kingdom informed the Assembly's Fourth Committee of the new territory, describing it as "an administrative re-adjustment, freely worked out with the Governments and elected representatives of the people concerned". According to the British record of the debate, speakers accused the United Kingdom of creating a new colony, of detaching land from a colony "regardless of compensation ('hush money') paid", of harming the interests of a minority even if the representatives of the majority had been persuaded to agree, and of violating resolution 1514 (XV). The Yearbook of the United Nations records that the representatives of Cuba, Tanzania and Yugoslavia drew attention to reports that the United Kingdom had decided to create a new colony from parts of Mauritius and Seychelles for British and American military and naval bases, which they said was contrary to the declaration and to the principle of self-determination. According to the same summary, the British representative replied that the islands had been uninhabited when the United Kingdom acquired them and had been attached to the Mauritius and Seychelles administrations for administrative convenience, that compensation would be paid and the welfare of their few inhabitants looked after, and that there was therefore no question of splitting up natural territorial units.

== Drafting and adoption ==
The draft resolution was introduced in the Fourth Committee on 24 November 1965 by India and Tanzania. According to the summary record, the Tanzanian representative said that paragraph 6 of resolution 1514 (XV) "must be interpreted unequivocally, without legal quibbles", and that to dismember Mauritius, create a new colonial entity and establish a military base there "would create a point of tension". The Indian representative said that India's government had told its parliament that the idea of a colonial power detaching part of a territory for such purposes "was repugnant and contrary to General Assembly resolution 1514 (XV)". According to the Yearbook, the sponsors regarded the dismemberment of the territory as undesirable and contrary to resolution 1514 (XV); Argentina, Bulgaria and Venezuela, among others, attached particular importance to the passage on detaching islands for a military base, and Argentina said that such a detachment would contravene paragraph 6 of the declaration whether or not military bases were involved.

On 26 November 1965 the Fourth Committee approved the draft by 77 votes to none, with 17 abstentions, including the United Kingdom. The Danish representative said that Denmark was "not convinced" that the steps taken by the United Kingdom, "in full agreement with the Government of Mauritius", conflicted with resolution 1514. The British delegate said that the United Kingdom could not support the paragraph describing detachment as a contravention of the declaration, still less regard the action as dismembering the territory, because the detachment had been freely agreed with the elected representatives of Mauritius. The general assembly adopted the resolution at its 1,398th plenary meeting on 16 December 1965, by 89 votes to none with 18 abstentions, without a roll-call vote.

=== Fourth Committee roll call ===
Because the plenary vote was not recorded by name, the only record of how individual states voted is the roll call in the Fourth Committee, taken at the request of India. The draft was introduced by Tanzania and India and finally sponsored by 33 states. (Note: The sponsors were Algeria, Cameroon, Ceylon, Cyprus, Dahomey, Ethiopia, Ghana, India, Iraq, Jordan, Kenya, Lebanon, Liberia, Libya, Mali, Mauritania, Morocco, Nepal, Niger, Nigeria, Saudi Arabia, Sierra Leone, Somalia, Sudan, Syria, Togo, Tunisia, Uganda, the United Arab Republic, Tanzania, Yemen, Yugoslavia and Zambia. Three of them, Lebanon, Nepal and Yemen, are not recorded as voting in the committee.) (Note: The summary record lists the 94 states that voted. The 23 states shown as not voting are the other members of the United Nations, which had 117 members in November 1965; Indonesia had withdrawn from the organisation in 1965.)

Roll-call vote in the Fourth Committee on draft resolution A/C.4/L.806/Rev.1 and Add.1, 26 November 1965
In favour (77) sponsors marked †	Abstaining (17)	Against (0)	Did not vote (23)
Afghanistan; Algeria†; Argentina; Brazil; Bulgaria; Burma; Byelorussian Soviet Socialist Republic; Cameroon†; Ceylon†; Chad; Chile; China; Colombia; Congo (Brazzaville); Congo (Democratic Republic of); Costa Rica; Cuba; Cyprus†; Czechoslovakia; Dahomey†; Denmark; Ethiopia†; Gabon; Ghana†; Greece; Guatemala; Guinea; Haiti; Honduras; Hungary; India†; Iran; Iraq†; Israel; Japan; Jordan†; Kenya†; Kuwait; Liberia† / Libya†; Malawi; Malaysia; Mali†; Mauritania†; Mexico; Mongolia; Morocco†; Niger†; Nigeria†; Pakistan; Panama; Peru; Philippines; Poland; Romania; Rwanda; Saudi Arabia†; Senegal; Sierra Leone†; Somalia†; Spain; Sudan†; Syria†; Thailand; Togo†; Trinidad and Tobago; Tunisia†; Turkey; Uganda†; Ukrainian Soviet Socialist Republic; Union of Soviet Socialist Republics; United Arab Republic†; United Republic of Tanzania†; Uruguay; Venezuela; Yugoslavia†; Zambia†	Australia; Austria; Belgium; Canada; Finland; France; Ireland; Italy; Jamaica; Netherlands; New Zealand; Norway; Portugal; South Africa; Sweden; United Kingdom of Great Britain and Northern Ireland; United States of America	–	Albania; Bolivia; Burundi; Cambodia; Central African Republic; Dominican Republic; Ecuador; El Salvador; Gambia; Iceland; Ivory Coast; Laos; Lebanon†; Luxembourg; Madagascar; Maldive Islands; Malta; Nepal†; Nicaragua; Paraguay; Singapore; Upper Volta; Yemen†

== Content ==
The preamble of the resolution recalled resolution 1514 (XV), regretted that the administering power "has not fully implemented resolution 1514 (XV) with regard to that Territory", and noted "with deep concern that any step taken by the administering Power to detach certain islands from the Territory of Mauritius for the purpose of establishing a military base would be in contravention of the Declaration, and in particular of paragraph 6 thereof". In its operative paragraphs, the general assembly:

1. approved the chapters on Mauritius in the reports of the Committee of Twenty-Four and endorsed their conclusions and recommendations;
2. reaffirmed "the inalienable right of the people of the Territory of Mauritius to freedom and independence";
3. invited the United Kingdom to take effective measures for the immediate and full implementation of resolution 1514 (XV);
4. invited the administering power "to take no action which would dismember the Territory of Mauritius and violate its territorial integrity";
5. invited the administering power to report on the implementation of the resolution; and
6. requested the Committee of Twenty-Four to keep the question of Mauritius under review and report at the twenty-first session.

The resolution did not mention the British Indian Ocean Territory by name.

== Aftermath ==
=== British assessment ===
In February 1966 the UK Mission to the United Nations observed that both the Fourth Committee and resolution 2066 had dealt with the matter "as part of the question of Mauritius", that "officially no cognizance was taken of the existence of B.I.O.T. as a separate entity", and that the resolution "simply noted with deep concern that any step to detach the islands 'would be' a contravention". It added: "Many delegations may not have tumbled to the fait accompli of separation." The same despatch warned that "it would not be difficult for our critics to develop the arguable thesis that detachment by itself was a breach of Article 73" of the UN Charter.

Samuel Bashfield and Elena Katselli Proukaki write that, despite the Assembly's call, and "in an effort to eliminate risks arising from UN scrutiny over de-colonialization and independence movements", the United Kingdom agreed with the United States to depopulate the archipelago. Tom Frost and C. R. G. Murray similarly identify the prevention of oversight of the territory by the United Nations decolonisation committee as one purpose of excluding its population, and write that the base on Diego Garcia was presented as an "austere communications facility" to deflect criticism that the Indian Ocean was being militarised.

=== Further UN action, 1966–1967 ===
In September 1966 a sub-committee of the Committee of Twenty-Four reported that the United Kingdom had violated the territorial integrity of Mauritius and Seychelles "by creating a new territory, the British Indian Ocean Territory, composed of islands detached from Mauritius and Seychelles, in direct contravention to resolution 2066 (XX)". On 20 December 1966 the general assembly adopted resolution 2232 (XXI), on a group of territories including Mauritius and Seychelles, which reiterated that "any attempt aimed at the partial or total disruption of the national unity and the territorial integrity of colonial Territories and the establishment of military bases and installations in these Territories is incompatible with the purposes and principles of the Charter". That paragraph was put to a separate vote, in which 18 states, including the United Kingdom and the United States, voted against and 27 abstained; the resolution as a whole was adopted by 93 votes to none, with 24 abstentions. In June 1967 the Committee of Twenty-Four deplored "the dismemberment of Mauritius and Seychelles" and called on the United Kingdom to return the detached islands. Resolution 2357 (XXII) of 19 December 1967 repeated the language of resolution 2232; it was adopted by 86 votes to none, with 27 abstentions.

Mauritius became independent on 12 March 1968 without the Chagos Archipelago. According to the United States, after Mauritius applied for UN membership no objections to the BIOT arrangements were pressed in the general assembly, and neither the Committee of Twenty-Four nor the Assembly considered another resolution on the territory until 2017. The legal scholar Zeno Crespi Reghizzi likewise noted that the Assembly's resolutions on the detachment had been adopted only before Mauritius became independent in 1968.

=== Later invocation ===
Mauritius first raised its claim to the archipelago at the general assembly on 9 October 1980. In later debates it invoked resolution 2066; on 30 September 1999, for example, its foreign minister said that the archipelago had been detached "in total disregard of the UN declaration embodied in resolution 1514 (XV) of 14 December 1960 and resolution 2066 (XX) of 16 December 1965, which prohibit the dismemberment of colonial territories prior to independence". In 2010 the African Union stated that the archipelago had been detached "in violation of [General Assembly] Resolutions 1514 (XV) of 14 December 1960 and 2066 (XX) of 16 December 1965 which prohibit colonial powers from dismembering colonial territories prior to granting independence". A House of Commons Library briefing of 2012 described Mauritius as viewing the dispute as one of "unfinished decolonisation" and British claims as violating General Assembly resolutions, "most notably" 1514 (XV) and 2066 (XX). In May 2016 the prime minister, Anerood Jugnauth, told the National Assembly that the United Kingdom had excised the archipelago before independence "in violation of international law and United Nations General Assembly Resolutions" 1514 (XV), 2066 (XX), 2232 (XXI) and 2357 (XXII). The General Assembly's resolution 71/292 of 22 June 2017 recalled resolution 2066 and asked the court whether the decolonisation of Mauritius had been lawfully completed having regard to obligations reflected in it.

== Legal significance ==
=== Positions of states ===
In the advisory proceedings Mauritius argued that the separation had dismembered a "people" before independence, while the United Kingdom maintained that Mauritius had consented to it by an inter-governmental agreement in 1965. Mauritius argued before the ICJ that, in resolution 2066, "the General Assembly recognised the undivided territory of Mauritius as the unit of self-determination". It noted that by the time the resolution was adopted the archipelago had already been detached, and argued that the United Kingdom had "in effect, acted to present the United Nations with a fait accompli".

The United Kingdom argued that resolution 2066 "did not however create any legal obligations for the United Kingdom, and did not purport to do so". It pointed out that the resolution was not drafted in mandatory terms, contained "no condemnation of the United Kingdom, nor any statement that it has acted in breach of international law", and merely "invited" the United Kingdom not to take future action, "knowing that the detachment had already occurred". It also argued that the resolution's "prime concern" was detachment "for the purpose of establishing a military base", not the recognition of the whole colony as a single unit of self-determination. The United States argued that the resolution "does not represent the articulation of a binding legal obligation", because it described detachment as contravening another non-binding resolution, and that the 18 abstentions showed that its interpretation of paragraph 6 of resolution 1514 was not a consensus view. James Summers described the British and American arguments as a "consensual" narrative, under which the scope of a colonial right of self-determination depended on agreement between anti-colonial and administering states, with the Friendly Relations Declaration of 1970 as the key instrument.

=== Advisory opinion of the International Court of Justice ===
In its advisory opinion of 25 February 2019, the ICJ held that, "by inviting the United Kingdom to comply with its international obligations in conducting the process of decolonization of Mauritius, the General Assembly acted within the framework of the Charter and within the scope of the functions assigned to it to oversee the application of the right to self-determination". It noted that resolution 2066 had been adopted "a few weeks after the detachment", and that the Assembly had "deemed it appropriate to recall the obligation of the United Kingdom, as the administering Power, to respect the territorial integrity of Mauritius". The court concluded that "the obligations arising under international law and reflected in the resolutions adopted by the General Assembly during the process of decolonization of Mauritius require the United Kingdom, as the administering Power, to respect the territorial integrity of that country, including the Chagos Archipelago". In a separate opinion, Judge Julia Sebutinde described resolution 2066 as "the immediate reaction" of the general assembly to the detachment.

=== Assessments ===
Summarising the advisory opinion in the American Journal of International Law, Diane Marie Amann wrote that the Assembly had "voiced concern about the detachment as early as 1965", part of the "backdrop of actions by international bodies" against which the detachment and the removal of the islanders unfolded. Peter H. Sand described the proclamation of the British Indian Ocean Territory as made "in defiance of several UN resolutions on decolonization", citing resolutions 1514 (XV) and 2066, and wrote that it had opened "a Pandora's box of international legal problems in the field of ocean governance". Besfort Rrecaj cited the resolution, with resolutions 2232 and 2357, for the statement that the Assembly had on several occasions "condemned the detachment of the Chagos Archipelago", and Géraldine Giraudeau, Lili Song and Morsen Mosses wrote that the Assembly's resolutions on Mauritius, including resolution 2066, had "already pinpointed" the principle of the territorial integrity of colonial territories that the court later confirmed. Julia Wagner read the resolution as declaring that the detachment would violate the 1960 declaration, and argued that because the Assembly had "assumed that the Chagos Islands belonged to Mauritius" and had accepted the British assertion that they were not permanently inhabited, the archipelago was not classified as a non-self-governing territory when Mauritius became independent.

James Summers noted that the resolution "specifically addressed Mauritius", whereas the two later resolutions named in the 2017 request dealt with a number of colonial territories. In his view the Assembly had been "careful not to overstate the legal significance of these formally non-binding resolutions", presenting them in its request as reflecting rather than creating obligations, although there was "a notable lack of other documents" on which such obligations could be based. He listed the resolution among several in which the Assembly, citing resolution 1514 (XV) and territorial integrity, criticised the separation of part of a colonial territory, but noted that the Assembly had also divided or accepted the division of other territories, such as the British Cameroons and Ruanda-Urundi, and questioned whether the principle of territorial integrity served as "a strong barrier to the division of a non-self-governing territory". Sue Farran suggested that the marine protected area declared around the archipelago in 2010 could be regarded as contrary to the resolution's invitation "just as much as the establishment of a military base on Diego Garcia", because it "evidences the exercise of sovereignty over the territory" by the United Kingdom.

== See also ==
- Detachment of the Chagos Archipelago
- Chagos Archipelago sovereignty dispute
- United Nations General Assembly Resolution 2065 (XX), adopted at the same meeting on the Falkland Islands

== Sources ==
=== United Nations documents and court decisions ===
- Legal Consequences of the Separation of the Chagos Archipelago from Mauritius in 1965, Advisory Opinion (PDF). I.C.J. Reports 2019. International Court of Justice. 25 February 2019.
- Sebutinde, Julia (25 February 2019). Separate Opinion of Judge Sebutinde (PDF). I.C.J. Reports 2019. International Court of Justice.
- United Nations General Assembly (16 December 1965). "2066 (XX). Question of Mauritius". Resolutions adopted by the General Assembly during its twentieth session. Official Records of the General Assembly, Twentieth Session, Supplement No. 14 (A/6014) – via Memorial of Mauritius, Annex 38.
- United Nations General Assembly, Fourth Committee (26 November 1965). Official Records of the General Assembly, Twentieth Session, Fourth Committee, 1570th meeting, 26 November 1965 (A/C.4/SR.1570) (Report). United Nations.
- United Nations General Assembly, Fourth Committee (December 1965). Implementation of the Declaration on the Granting of Independence to Colonial Countries and Peoples: chapters concerning territories not considered separately. Report of the Fourth Committee (A/6160) (Report). United Nations.
- United Nations General Assembly (16 December 1965). Official Records, Twentieth Session, 1398th plenary meeting, 16 December 1965 (A/PV.1398) (Report). United Nations.
- United Nations Office of Public Information (1967). "The situation with regard to the implementation of the Declaration on the Granting of Independence to Colonial Countries and Peoples" (PDF). Yearbook of the United Nations 1965. New York: United Nations.

=== Written statements to the International Court of Justice ===
- Written Statement of the Republic of Mauritius (PDF). Vol. I. International Court of Justice. 1 March 2018.
- Written Comments of the United Kingdom (PDF). International Court of Justice. 15 May 2018.
- Written Statement of the United Kingdom (PDF). International Court of Justice. 15 February 2018.
- Written Statement of the United States of America (PDF). International Court of Justice. 1 March 2018.

=== Archive documents ===
Reproduced in the annexes to the Memorial of Mauritius in the Chagos Marine Protected Area arbitration.

- Brown, F. D. W. (2 February 1966). Despatch from the UK Mission to the United Nations, New York, to C. G. Eastwood, Colonial Office (PDF) – via Memorial of Mauritius, Annex 40.
- UK Mission to the United Nations, New York, Telegram No. 2837 to the Foreign Office (PDF). 8 November 1965 – via Memorial of Mauritius, Annex 31.
- UK Mission to the United Nations, New York, Telegram No. 2971 to the Foreign Office (PDF). 16 November 1965 – via Memorial of Mauritius, Annex 35.
- UK Mission to the United Nations, New York, Telegram No. 2972 to the Foreign Office (PDF). 16 November 1965 – via Memorial of Mauritius, Annex 36.

=== Books and journals ===
- Amann, Diane Marie (October 2019). "Legal Consequences of the Separation of the Chagos Archipelago from Mauritius in 1965". American Journal of International Law. 113 (4): 784–791. doi:10.1017/ajil.2019.50.
- Bashfield, Samuel; Katselli Proukaki, Elena (2022). "The Rules-Based Order, International Law and the British Indian Ocean Territory: Do as I Say, Not as I Do". German Law Journal. 23: 713–737. doi:10.1017/glj.2022.44. hdl:1885/317015.
- Crespi Reghizzi, Zeno (2018). "La juridiction consultative à l'épreuve du principe consensuel: l'affaire des Effets juridiques de la séparation de l'archipel des Chagos de Maurice en 1965" [Advisory jurisdiction tested by the consensual principle: the case of the Legal Consequences of the Separation of the Chagos Archipelago from Mauritius in 1965] (PDF). Zoom-out. Questions of International Law (in French) (55): 15–34.
- Farran, Sue (2018). "Chagos and the ICJ – The Marine Protected Area" (PDF). Zoom-out. Questions of International Law (55): 71–84.
- Frost, Tom; Murray, C. R. G. (2015). "The Chagos Islands cases: the empire strikes back". Northern Ireland Legal Quarterly. 66 (3): 263–287. doi:10.53386/nilq.v66i3.153.
- Giraudeau, Géraldine; Song, Lili; Mosses, Morsen (2024). "Chagos in the South Pacific? The principle of self-determination and the France–Vanuatu dispute over the Matthew and Hunter Islands". Leiden Journal of International Law. 37 (4): 939–962. doi:10.1017/S0922156524000207.
- Rrecaj, Besfort T. (2020). "Legal Consequences of the Separation of the Chagos Archipelago from Mauritius in 1965 (ICJ Advisory Opinion, 25 February 2019, General List No. 169)". Utrecht Journal of International and European Law. 35 (1): 50–55. doi:10.5334/ujiel.492.
- Sand, Peter H. (2018). "The British Indian Ocean Territory: International Legal Black Hole?" (PDF). Zoom-out. Questions of International Law. 55: 35–59.
- Summers, James (2018). "Decolonisation revisited and the obligation not to divide a Non-Self-Governing Territory" (PDF). Zoom-out. Questions of International Law (55): 147–176.
- Wagner, Julia (2018). "The Chagos request and the role of the consent principle in the ICJ's advisory jurisdiction, or: What to do when opportunity knocks" (PDF). Zoom-out. Questions of International Law (55): 177–189.

=== News and other sources ===
- "Chagos and Tromelin: Mauritius adamant to recover excised territories". News on Sunday. Le Défi Media Group. 20 May 2016.
- Lunn, Jon (20 April 2012). The Chagos Islanders (Report). Standard Note SN04463. House of Commons Library.
- Mills, Claire (8 February 2021). Disputes over the British Indian Ocean Territory: February 2021 update (Report). Briefing Paper 9134. House of Commons Library.
