= Diane Marie Amann =

American law professor

- Occupation: Legal Academic

Academic background
- Education: Northwestern University (JD); University of California, Los Angeles (Master of Arts in political science); University of Illinois Urbana-Champaign (BS in journalism); Utrecht University (Dr h.c. in law)

Academic work
- Discipline: public international law, constitutional law, legal history, human rights, children's rights, national security, laws of war, comparative law, criminal law
- Institutions: Faculty of Law, University of Oxford, LSE Law School, UCL Faculty of Laws, University of Georgia, UC Davis Law School

Diane Marie Amann is Departmental Lecturer in Public International Law at the Faculty of Law, University of Oxford, and an Academic Affiliate at Oxford's Bonavero Institute of Human Rights.

She is also Visiting Professor at London School of Economics LSE Law School, Honorary Professor at UCL Faculty of Laws, and Regents' Professor of International Law Emerita and Emily & Ernest Woodruff Chair in International Law Emerita at the University of Georgia School of Law, where she served as an Associate Dean, as a Faculty Director of the Dean Rusk International Law Center, and as Professor International Affairs (by courtesy) at the University of Georgia School of Public and International Affairs. Previously, she was Professor of Law, Martin Luther King Jr. Research Scholar, and founding Director of the California International Law Center at the University of California, Davis School of Law.

She has held visiting posts at: Exeter College, Oxford; University of Paris Faculty of Law; UCLA School of Law; UC Berkeley School of Law; Northwestern University Pritzker School of Law; USC Shoah Foundation; School of Law, Trinity College Dublin; and Max Planck Institute Luxembourg.

Amann served from 2012 to 2021 as International Criminal Court Prosecutor Fatou Bensouda's Special Adviser on Children in and affected by Armed Conflict; her service included assisting in preparation of the ICC Office of the Prosecutor Policy on Children (2016). She has contributed two lectures to the United Nations Audiovisual Library on International Law: "Child-Taking and International Law" (2026) and "Child Rights, Conflict, and International Criminal Justice" (2019).

== Education and career ==
Amann holds a J.D. from Northwestern University School of Law in Chicago, a M.A. in political science from the University of California, Los Angeles, and a B.S. in journalism from the University of Illinois, Urbana-Champaign. She served as a law clerk to U.S. Supreme Court Justice John Paul Stevens and U.S. District Judge Prentice Marshall, and practiced as a federal criminal defense attorney in San Francisco before entering academia.

She is a life member of the Council on Foreign Relations, Fellow of the Royal Historical Society, former Counsellor and past Vice President of the American Society of International Law, former co-chair of the European Society of International Law Interest Group on International Criminal Justice, and past Chair of the Section on International Law of the Association of American Law Schools. She is a Distinguished Fellow of the National Institute of Military Justice.

Recent additions to her many print publications include “Missile Strike on the Shajareh Tayyebeh Elementary School, Minab, Iran (2026, co-authored with Tom Dannenbaum) and "Child-Taking Justice and the Federal Indian Boarding School Initiative” (2025), both in the American Journal of International Law (on whose Board of Editors she serves); and “Absented at the Creation: Nuremberg Women and International Criminal Justice” in The Oxford Handbook on Women and International Law (J. Jarpa Dawuni, Nienke Grossman, Jaya Ramji-Nogales, Hélène Ruiz Fabri eds., 2025). Other journals in which she has published include the European Journal of International Law, Michigan Journal of International Law, Georgetown Law Journal, Northwestern University Law Review, UCLA Law Review, and University of Pennsylvania Law Review.

Amann has published online at EJIL: Talk!, Just Security, The New York Times' Room for Debate, SCOTUSblog, Slate's Convictions, The Blog of Legal Times, and The Huffington Post. She was the founding editor-in-chief (2007-2021) of IntLawGrrls, a blog that featured contributions hundreds of judges, academics, students, and practitioners.

== See also ==
- List of law clerks for the fourth seat of the Supreme Court of the United States
