= Ronny Nouwen =

Dutch footballer

Ronnie Nouwen
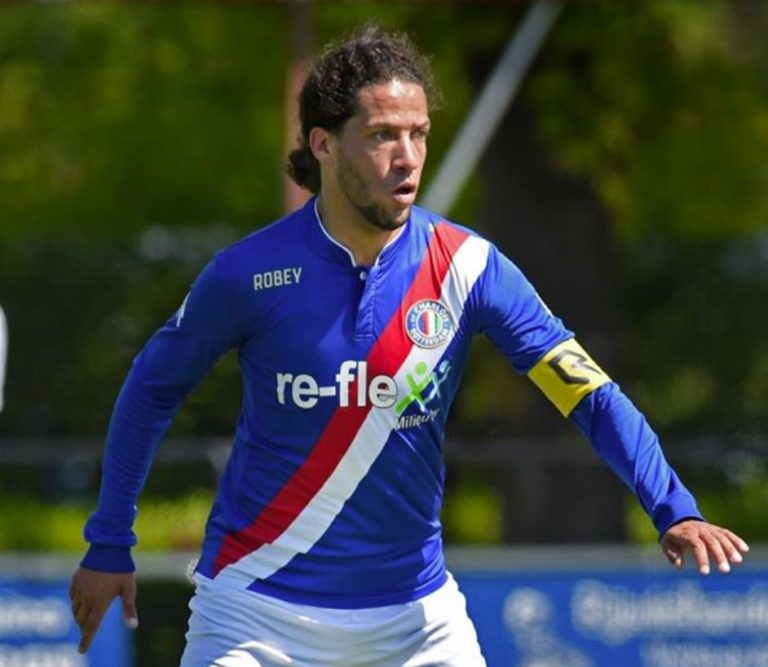

Personal information
- Full name: Ronald Nouwen
- Date of birth: 21 July 1982 (age 44)
- Place of birth: Rotterdam, Netherlands
- Height: 1.84 m (6 ft 1/2 in)
- Position: Midfielder

Team information
- Current team: IFC Ambacht

Youth career
- Excelsior Rotterdam

Senior career*
Years	Team	Apps	(Gls)
2001–2006	Excelsior Rotterdam	34	(0)
2006–2009	DOTO Pernis		
2009–2010	RVVH		
2010–2013	SC Feyenoord		
2013–2018	IFC Ambacht		
2018–2020	SV Charlerois		

International career
2004–2015	Aruba	6	(0)
- * Club domestic league appearances and goals

Ronny Nouwen (born 21 July 1982 in Rotterdam) is a Dutch football midfielder currently playing for SV Charlerois.

== Club career ==
Nouwen played professional football with Excelsior Rotterdam before joining the amateur ranks with DOTO in 2005. In the summer of 2009, he joined RVVH from Ridderkerk. In 2010, he moved on to SC Feyenoord, in 2010 to IFC Ambacht, and in 2018 to SV Charlerois. He retired from playing in 2020.

== International career ==
Nouwen debuted for Aruba in a March 2004 World Cup qualification match against Surinam. He has played five games for Aruba.
