= Sarah Nouwen =

Academic

- Born: Sarah Maria Heiltjen Nouwen; Netherlands
- Occupation: Academic
- Title: Professor of Public International Law

Academic work
- Discipline: International law
- Institutions: European University Institute, University of Cambridge
- Main interests: International law

Sarah M.H. Nouwen is an academic in the areas of international law of peacemaking and justice. She is a Professor of International Law at the European University Institute, Florence, Italy, in the Department of Law, on leave as Professor in International Law and Fellow of the Lauterpacht Centre for International Law at the University of Cambridge and Fellow of Pembroke College, Cambridge. She is also an editor-in-chief of the European Journal of International Law.

== Career ==
Nouwen studied law (Dutch law and international law) at Utrecht University receiving an LLB and LLM, part of which she completed at the University of Western Cape and the University of Cape Town, South Africa. Subsequently, she obtained an MPhil in International Relations and a PhD in Law from the University of Cambridge.

Prior to assuming her academic roles, she worked in international diplomacy for the Netherlands Ministry of Foreign Affairs in New York, The Hague, the Netherlands Embassy in Khartoum (2005-2006) and the UK Department for International Development in Darfur advising on transitional justice, peace negotiations, and the rule of law. From 2010-2011 she was Senior Legal Advisor to the African Union High-Level Panel on Sudan assisting with negotiations on peace for Darfur, and on state succession between the Government of Sudan and the Government of Southern Sudan. In 2014, Nouwen received the Philip Leverhulme Prize which recognizes researchers with a promising career who are receiving international recognition for their work.

She was a Senior Fellow of the World Peace Foundation at the Fletcher School of Law and Diplomacy, Tufts University, Boston. She has also been a visiting scholar at the Free University of Amsterdam and a Research Associate of the Refugee Law Project, Makerere University, Kampala.

Her research interests include a broad range of domains in international law, international human rights law, transitional justice, peace negotiations/peacekeeping/peacebuilding/peacemaking, third world approaches to international law, anthropological approaches to international law and the history of international law among others.

Nouwen has given guest lectures across the world including at universities in Australia, Europe, North America, and Africa.

== Selected publications ==
- S.M.H. Nouwen, Complementarity in the Line of Fire: The Catalysing Effect of the International Criminal Court in Uganda and Sudan, Cambridge University Press, Cambridge, Cambridge Series in Law and Society, and, Cambridge University Press, Cape Town, Cambridge Africa Collection, 2013,
- S. Kendall and S. M.H. Nouwen, ‘Representational Practices at the International Criminal Court: The Gap between Juridified and Abstract Victimhood’, Law & Contemporary Problems, 2014, 76(3 & 4), pp. 235–262
- S. M.H. Nouwen, ‘‘As You Set Out for Ithaka’: Practical, Epistemological, Ethical and Existential Questions About Socio-legal Empirical Research in Conflict’, Leiden Journal of International Law, 2014, 27(1) pp. 227–260 (Leiden Journal of International Law Prize for best article published in 2013-2015)
- S. M.H. Nouwen, Justifying Justice, in: J. Crawford and M. Koskenniemi (eds), The Cambridge Companion to International Law, Cambridge University Press, Cambridge, 2012, pp. 327–351
- S. Nouwen and W.G. Werner, ‘Doing Justice to the Political: The International Criminal Court in Uganda and Sudan’, European Journal of International Law, 2011, 21(4), pp. 941–965
