= European Journal of International Law =

- Discipline: International law
- Language: English
- Edited by: Sarah Nouwen and Joseph Weiler

Publication details
- History: 1990–present
- Publisher: Oxford University Press on behalf of EJIL Ltd.
- Frequency: Quarterly
- Impact factor: 1.2 (2022)

Standard abbreviations
- ISO 4: Eur. J. Int. Law

Indexing
- ISSN: 0938-5428 (print); 1464-3596 (web)
- LCCN: 91645478
- OCLC no.: 525519934

Links
- Journal homepage; Online access; Online archive

The European Journal of International Law is a quarterly law journal covering international law in a combination of theoretical and practical approaches. It also provides coverage of the relationship between international law and European Union law. The journal was established in 1990 by a group of scholars based at the European University Institute, the University of Florence, LMU Munich, Paris-Panthéon-Assas University, and the University of Michigan Law School.

The journal has close links with the European Society of International Law (ESIL). Members of the ESIL get online subscription to the Journal.

Originally bilingual in English and French, it now publishes in English only. New content is reserved to subscribers, but becomes available open access after 12 months. The full text of one lead article and all review essays and book reviews of the current year are also accessible for free online.

The journal is published by Oxford University Press and the editors-in-chief are Sarah M. H. Nouwen (European University Institute and Lauterpacht Centre for International Law) and Joseph H. H. Weiler (New York University Law School). The journal is released four times a year.

According to the Journal Citation Reports, the journal has a 2022 impact factor of 1.2, ranking it 82nd out of 154 journals in the category "Law" and 73rd out of 96 journals in the category "International Relations".

== See also ==
- American Journal of International Law
- EJIL: Talk!
- List of international relations journals
- List of law journals
