= Yearbook of the United Nations =

Annual publication

The Yearbook of the United Nations is an annual publication that provides comprehensive coverage of the United Nations' activity for each given year. The Yearbook, which is published by the United Nations Department of Global Communications, stands as "the authoritative reference work on the annual activities and concerns of the Organization." Fully indexed, the Yearbook also includes the texts of all major General Assembly, Security Council, and Economic and Social Council resolutions and decisions, placing them in a unique narrative context of United Nations consideration, deliberation and action. This in-depth narrative of its annual work has been produced by the United Nations since 1946.

The most recent issue of the Yearbook, Volume 68, covers the achievements of the United Nations in 2014. It is available on the Yearbook website and may be ordered from booksellers worldwide.

== Structure and scope ==
The yearbook covers five main subjects: political and security questions; human rights issues; economic and social questions; legal questions; and institutional, administrative, and budgetary questions. Chapters and topical headings present summaries of pertinent UN activities, including those of intergovernmental and expert bodies, major reports, Secretariat activities and, in selected cases, the views of States in written communications.

=== Activities of United Nations bodies ===
The Yearbook contextualizes all resolutions, decisions, and other major activities of the principal organs of the United Nations and, on a selective basis, those of subsidiary bodies, and either reproduces or summarizes them in the appropriate chapter. The texts of all resolutions and decisions of substantive nature adopted by the General Assembly, the Security Council, and the Economic and Social Council are reproduced or summarized under the relevant topic. In addition to the narrative context, these texts are preceded by procedural details giving the date of adoption, meeting number, and vote totals (in favour, against, or abstaining) if any, and an indication of their approval by a sessional or subsidiary body before final adoption. The texts are followed by details of any recorded or roll-call vote on the resolution or decision as a whole.

=== Major reports ===
Most reports of the Secretary-General, along with selected reports from other UN sources, such as committees, expert groups, seminars and working groups, are briefly summarized.

=== Secretariat activities ===
The operational activities of the United Nations for development and humanitarian assistance are described under the relevant topics. For major activities financed outside the UN regular budget, selected information is given on contributions and expenditures.

=== Views of States ===
Written communications sent to the United Nations by the Member States and circulated as documents of the principal organs are summarized in selected cases under the relevant topics. Substantive actions by the Security Council are analyzed, and brief reviews of the Council’s deliberations given, particularly in cases where an issue was taken up but no resolution was adopted.

== Related publications ==
Available on the Yearbook website, the Yearbook Pre-press complements the published Yearbook collection by offering draft chapters and detailed chapter research outlines from Yearbooks currently in production.

The online-only multilingual Yearbook Express, also on the website, features the chapter introductions of recent Yearbooks, along with the report of the Secretary-General on the work of the Organization in those years, in all six UN official languages. The Yearbook Express goes back to the year 1983, the first year in which Yearbook chapters featured individual introductions.

The Yearbook Twitter account @UNYearbook offers a historical perspective on current UN activities and concerns.
