= United Nations General Assembly Resolution 71/292 =

Resolution regarding the Chagos Archipelago

UN General Assembly Resolution 71/292
- Date: 22 June 2017
- Meeting no.: 88
- Code: A/RES/71/292 (Document)
- Subject: Request for an advisory opinion on the separation of the Chagos Archipelago from Mauritius
- Voting summary: 94 voted for; 15 voted against; 65 abstained
- Result: Adopted

United Nations General Assembly Resolution 71/292 is a resolution adopted by the United Nations General Assembly on 22 June 2017 requesting an advisory opinion from the International Court of Justice (ICJ) on the legal consequences of the separation of the Chagos Archipelago from Mauritius in 1965. It asked the court whether the decolonisation of Mauritius had been lawfully completed when the country became independent in 1968, and what consequences under international law arose from the United Kingdom's continued administration of the archipelago. The resolution was introduced by the Congo on behalf of the 54 African member states and adopted by a recorded vote of 94 to 15, with 65 abstentions.

The United Kingdom and the United States opposed the request, arguing that it was an attempt to bring a bilateral sovereignty dispute before the court without the United Kingdom's consent. Mauritius and its supporters argued that it concerned the unfinished decolonisation of Mauritius, a matter for the United Nations as a whole. The court accepted the request and delivered its advisory opinion on 25 February 2019, concluding that the decolonisation of Mauritius had not been lawfully completed.

== Background ==
The United Kingdom detached the Chagos Archipelago from the colony of Mauritius in November 1965 to form the British Indian Ocean Territory, three years before Mauritius became independent. Mauritius began to claim the archipelago in 1980. The United Kingdom's declaration accepting the compulsory jurisdiction of the ICJ excluded disputes with members of the Commonwealth; in 2004, after Mauritius indicated that it would leave the Commonwealth in order to bring a case, the United Kingdom amended the declaration to exclude disputes with states that are or have been Commonwealth members. In 2015 an arbitral tribunal constituted under the United Nations Convention on the Law of the Sea held, in Mauritius v United Kingdom, that it had no jurisdiction over the parties' dispute regarding sovereignty over the archipelago.

On 17 May 2016, the prime minister of Mauritius, Anerood Jugnauth, told the Mauritian parliament that if the United Kingdom did not agree by the end of June 2016 on a date for the return of the archipelago, Mauritius would take action "at the international level, including at the United Nations". On 14 July 2016, Mauritius asked for an item on a request for an advisory opinion to be included on the agenda of the 71st session of the general assembly. On 16 September 2016 the Assembly included the item, on the understanding that it would not be considered before June 2017. According to the Congolese representative, the deferral was agreed at the request of the United Kingdom, to allow time for the two states to reach a solution. The two governments held three rounds of talks, which did not resolve their differences. On 1 June 2017 Mauritius asked for the item to be considered "at the earliest date possible".

== Content ==
The preamble of the resolution recalls the Declaration on the Granting of Independence to Colonial Countries and Peoples (resolution 1514 (XV)), "in particular paragraph 6 thereof", and resolution 2066 (XX) of 1965, in which the Assembly invited the United Kingdom "to take no action which would dismember the Territory of Mauritius and violate its territorial integrity". It also notes the resolutions on the archipelago adopted by the Organisation of African Unity, the African Union and the Non-Aligned Movement, and "the deep concern expressed therein at the forcible removal by the United Kingdom of Great Britain and Northern Ireland of all the inhabitants of the Chagos Archipelago".

The operative part requests the court, under Article 96 of the Charter of the United Nations and Article 65 of the Statute of the Court, to give an advisory opinion on two questions:

(a) "Was the process of decolonization of Mauritius lawfully completed when Mauritius was granted independence in 1968, following the separation of the Chagos Archipelago from Mauritius and having regard to international law, including obligations reflected in General Assembly resolutions 1514 (XV) of 14 December 1960, 2066 (XX) of 16 December 1965, 2232 (XXI) of 20 December 1966 and 2357 (XXII) of 19 December 1967?"; (b) "What are the consequences under international law, including obligations reflected in the above-mentioned resolutions, arising from the continued administration by the United Kingdom of Great Britain and Northern Ireland of the Chagos Archipelago, including with respect to the inability of Mauritius to implement a programme for the resettlement on the Chagos Archipelago of its nationals, in particular those of Chagossian origin?"

== Debate ==
The draft resolution (A/71/L.73) was considered at the 88th plenary meeting of the 71st session on 22 June 2017. Argentina, Bolivia, Cuba, Ecuador, Nicaragua and Venezuela joined the African states as sponsors.

=== Supporters ===
Introducing the draft, the Congolese representative, Raymond Serge Balé, said that the initiative sought "to complete the decolonization of Africa and to allow a State member of both the African Union and the United Nations to exercise its full sovereignty over the Chagos archipelago". He said that the talks between Mauritius and the United Kingdom had made no progress "since neither party wished during the talks to focus on the central issue of decolonization".

Anerood Jugnauth, by then Minister Mentor of Mauritius, said that he was the only surviving participant in the 1965 constitutional conference in London and was "personally aware of the circumstances under which the Chagos archipelago was excised". He said that he was accompanied by Mauritians of Chagossian origin "who were forcibly evicted from the Chagos archipelago". He cited British documents of 1965 and 1966 showing "a deliberate intent to present the United Nations with a fait accompli", including Colonial Secretary Anthony Greenwood's minute to the prime minister. He argued that Mauritius, as a colony, "had no legal competence as a State to give any consent to the detachment", and that breaches of international law "can never validly be acquiesced in or consented to or traded off with money". He said that Mauritius had "no problem with the military base" and was "committed to the continued operation of the base in Diego Garcia under a long-term framework".

Venezuela, speaking for the Non-Aligned Movement, and Angola, speaking for the Southern African Development Community, supported the draft. The Indian representative, Syed Akbaruddin, said that India shared concerns about security in the Indian Ocean but that "on balance, however, it is a matter of principle for India to uphold the process of decolonization and respect for the sovereignty of nations". Kenya's representative asked: "What could possibly be so unpalatable about that?"

=== Opponents ===
The British permanent representative, Matthew Rycroft, called for the draft to be withdrawn and said that "this is not a matter of decolonization", because Mauritius had accepted the detachment in talks with its Council of Ministers, "an agreement that Mauritius continued to respect until the 1980s". He said that the request was "an attempt by the Government of Mauritius to circumvent the vital principle that a State is not obliged to have its bilateral disputes submitted for judicial settlement without its consent", and that the United Kingdom did not and would not give that consent. He said that the United Kingdom had offered, without prejudice to its sovereignty, joint management of all the islands except Diego Garcia and forms of security co-operation, and had decided against resettlement of the Chagossians "on the grounds of feasibility, cost and defence and security interests", while implementing a $50 million support package. He said that the United Kingdom's agreement with the United States lasted until 2036, and that "when we no longer need the territory for defence purposes, sovereignty will pass", as it had with the islands returned to Seychelles. In his explanation of vote, he called the draft "a back-door route to the Court".

The American representative, Michele Sison, said that the United States "has consistently recognized United Kingdom sovereignty over the Chagos archipelago", and that the request sought "to circumvent the Court's lack of contentious jurisdiction over this purely bilateral matter". She warned that adopting it would set "a dangerous precedent" for other bilateral disputes.

Before the vote, the secretariat estimated that the cost of an advisory opinion could range from about $450,000 to $600,000.

== Vote ==
The resolution was adopted by a recorded vote of 94 to 15, with 65 abstentions. (Note: The draft resolution was submitted by the Congo "on behalf of the States Members of the United Nations that are members of the Group of African States". Argentina, Bolivia, Cuba, Ecuador, Nicaragua and Venezuela were added as sponsors on the day of the vote. Of the 54 members of the African Group, Libya, Morocco, Senegal and Somalia did not vote.) (Note: The meeting record lists the 174 states that voted. The 19 states shown as not voting are the other members of the United Nations, which had 193 members at the time.) Nineteen member states did not vote, among them Libya, Morocco, Senegal and Somalia; no African state voted against or abstained.

Recorded vote on draft resolution A/71/L.73, 22 June 2017
In favour (94) sponsors marked †	Abstaining (65)	Against (15)	Did not vote (19)
Algeria†; Angola†; Argentina†; Azerbaijan; Bahamas; Bangladesh; Belarus; Belize; Benin†; Bhutan; Bolivia (Plurinational State of)† Botswana†; Brazil; Burkina Faso†; Burundi†; Cabo Verde†; Cameroon†; Central African Republic†; Chad†; Comoros†; Congo†; Costa Rica; Cuba†; Cyprus; Côte d'Ivoire†; North Korea; Democratic Republic of the Congo†; Djibouti†; Dominican Republic; Ecuador†; Egypt†; El Salvador; Equatorial Guinea†; Eritrea†; Ethiopia†; Fiji; Gabon†; Gambia†; Ghana†; Guatemala; Guinea†; Guinea-Bissau†; Guyana; India; Jordan; Kenya†; Kiribati / Lebanon; Lesotho†; Liberia†; Madagascar†; Malawi†; Malaysia; Mali†; Marshall Islands; Mauritania†; Mauritius†; Mozambique†; Namibia†; Nauru; Nepal; Nicaragua†; Niger†; Nigeria†; Pakistan; Papua New Guinea; Peru; Philippines; Republic of Moldova; Rwanda†; Sao Tome and Principe†; Saudi Arabia; Serbia; Seychelles†; Sierra Leone†; South Africa†; South Sudan†; Sudan†; Swaziland†; Syrian Arab Republic; Thailand; Togo†; Trinidad and Tobago; Tunisia†; Uganda†; United Arab Emirates; United Republic of Tanzania†; Uruguay; Vanuatu; Venezuela (Bolivarian Republic of)† Viet Nam; Yemen; Zambia†; Zimbabwe†	Andorra; Armenia; Austria; Bahrain; Barbados; Belgium; Bosnia and Herzegovina; Brunei Darussalam; Canada; Chile; China; Colombia; Czech Republic; Denmark; Estonia; Finland; France; Germany; Greece; Grenada; Iceland; Indonesia; Iraq; Ireland; Italy; Jamaica; Kazakhstan; Kuwait; Kyrgyzstan; Latvia; Liechtenstein; Luxembourg; Malta; Mexico; Micronesia (Federated States of); Mongolia; Myanmar; Netherlands; Norway; Oman; Palau; Panama; Paraguay; Poland; Portugal; Qatar; Romania; Russian Federation; Saint Kitts and Nevis; Saint Lucia; Saint Vincent and the Grenadines; Samoa; San Marino; Singapore; Slovakia; Slovenia; Solomon Islands; Spain; Sri Lanka; Sweden; Switzerland; Timor-Leste; Turkey; Tuvalu; The former Yugoslav Republic of Macedonia	Afghanistan; Albania; Australia; Bulgaria; Croatia; Hungary; Israel; Japan; Lithuania; Maldives; Montenegro; New Zealand; South Korea; United Kingdom of Great Britain and Northern Ireland; United States of America	Antigua and Barbuda; Cambodia; Dominica; Georgia; Haiti; Honduras; Iran (Islamic Republic of); Lao People's Democratic Republic; Libya†; Monaco; Morocco†; Senegal†; Somalia†; Suriname; Tajikistan; Tonga; Turkmenistan; Ukraine; Uzbekistan

Several states explained their votes. Australia said that it was "not appropriate for the advisory opinion jurisdiction of the Court to be used to determine the rights and interests of States arising in a specific context", and that the Diego Garcia military base "plays a pivotal role in the global fight against terrorism". France, Germany, Canada, Sweden, New Zealand and Israel argued that the matter was a bilateral dispute, or that the court's advisory jurisdiction was not an appropriate way to address it without the consent of both states. China abstained, expressing "firm support for the decolonization process and its understanding of the position of Mauritius", and called for continued bilateral negotiations. Brazil said that a vote in favour "does not mean a commitment to any particular interpretation of the underlying issue". El Salvador said that the question was one of decolonisation rather than an ordinary bilateral dispute, adding: "We do not have nuclear weapons; we do not have big armies to defend our sovereignty. It is international law that defends us".

In its later written statement to the court, the United Kingdom noted that fewer than half of the UN's members had voted for the resolution, and that 80 had voted against or abstained.

== Advisory proceedings ==
The secretary-general transmitted the request to the court by a letter of 23 June 2017. Thirty-one states and the African Union filed written statements, and 22 states and the African Union took part in oral hearings held from 3 to 6 September 2018. The United Kingdom and other participants argued that the court should decline to answer because the questions concerned a bilateral dispute between two states that had not consented to its settlement by the court. The court rejected that argument, holding that the request concerned "the decolonization of Mauritius" and that "the General Assembly has not sought the Court's opinion to resolve a territorial dispute between two States". Judge Joan Donoghue, dissenting, considered that the opinion had "the effect of circumventing the absence of United Kingdom consent to judicial settlement".

In its opinion of 25 February 2019, the court found, by 13 votes to 1, that the decolonisation of Mauritius had not been lawfully completed when it became independent in 1968, that the United Kingdom was under an obligation to end its administration of the archipelago "as rapidly as possible", and that all member states were under an obligation to co-operate with the United Nations to complete the decolonisation of Mauritius.

== See also ==
- United Nations General Assembly Resolution 2066 (XX)
- Chagos Archipelago sovereignty dispute
- Detachment of the Chagos Archipelago

== Sources ==
- Donoghue, Joan (25 February 2019). Dissenting Opinion of Judge Donoghue (PDF). I.C.J. Reports 2019. International Court of Justice.
- Legal Consequences of the Separation of the Chagos Archipelago from Mauritius in 1965, Advisory Opinion (PDF). I.C.J. Reports 2019. International Court of Justice. 25 February 2019.
- Written Statement of the United Kingdom (PDF). International Court of Justice. 15 February 2018.
- United Nations General Assembly (15 June 2017). Congo: draft resolution (A/71/L.73) (Report). United Nations.
- United Nations General Assembly (22 June 2017). Congo: draft resolution. Addendum (A/71/L.73/Add.1) (Report). United Nations.
- United Nations General Assembly (22 June 2017). Official Records, Seventy-first session, 88th plenary meeting, Thursday, 22 June 2017 (A/71/PV.88) (Report). United Nations.
- United Nations General Assembly (22 June 2017). Resolution adopted by the General Assembly on 22 June 2017: 71/292. Request for an advisory opinion of the International Court of Justice on the legal consequences of the separation of the Chagos Archipelago from Mauritius in 1965 (A/RES/71/292) (Report). United Nations.
