= Utrecht Journal of International and European Law =

- Discipline: Law
- Language: English
- Edited by: Desiree van Iersel

Publication details
- Former name: Merkourios
- History: 1981–present
- Publisher: Ubiquity Press
- Frequency: Biannually
- Open access: Yes

Standard abbreviations
- ISO 4: Utrecht J. Int. Eur. Law

Indexing
- ISSN: 0927-460X (print); 2053-5341 (web)
- LCCN: 2015269181
- OCLC no.: 864417242

Links
- Journal homepage; Online archive (2010–present)

The Utrecht Journal of International and European Law is a biannual peer-reviewed open access law journal covering international and European law. It is affiliated with Utrecht University and Urios.

The journal was established in 1981 as a student magazine titled Merkourios, containing summaries of study-trips, conferences, and other issues related to Urios, an association for international and European law. Since then it has evolved from a magazine into a formal, academic law journal. This development was finalised in 2009, when peer-review was officially integrated into the reviewing process. The journal obtained its current name in 2013, and is published by Ubiquity Press.

A complete log of all previous issues is hosted by HeinOnline.
