= EJIL: Talk! =

International law blog

- Website type: Blog
- Owner: European Journal of International Law (itself part of Oxford University Press)
- Editors: Marko Milanovic, Diane Desierto, Devika Hovell, Julian Arato, Nehal Bhuta, Justina Uriburu, Wanshu Cong, Miles Jackson
- Website: ejiltalk.org
- Commercial: No
- Launched: 2008
- Current status: Active

EJIL:Talk! is an international law blog. It is the blog of the European Journal of International Law, "firmly established as one of the world's leading journals in its field" and closely linked with the European Society of International Law. It has been described as "the widely read European Journal of International Law blog", as well as a "leading international law blog", an "influential international law blog", and a "popular international law blog". It is regularly identified as one of the leading international law blogs, together with Opinio Juris (blog).

Articles published in the blog are regularly referenced in major newspapers such as The Guardian. EJIL: Talk! articles have occasionally been cross-posted in other leading platforms including Lawfare. They have also been cited in written comments before the International Court of Justice by states such as the United States.

The blog consistently publishes pieces by the most influential international law scholars and international lawyers from around the world. These have included James Crawford (jurist), Rosalyn Higgins, Baroness Higgins, Alain Pellet, Bruno Simma, Philippe Sands, Gilbert Guillaume, Philip Alston, Christine Chinkin and former editor Dapo Akande.
