= Mauritius–Maldives maritime boundary case =

2019–2023 maritime boundary case

Dispute concerning Delimitation of the Maritime Boundary between Mauritius and Maldives in the Indian Ocean
- Court: International Tribunal for the Law of the Sea (Special Chamber)
- Full case name: Dispute concerning delimitation of the maritime boundary between Mauritius and Maldives in the Indian Ocean (Mauritius/Maldives)
- Decided: 28 January 2021 (preliminary objections); 28 April 2023 (merits)
- Citation: ITLOS Case No. 28

Court membership
- Judges sitting: Paik Jin-hyun (President of the Special Chamber); José Luís Jesus; Stanisław Pawlak; Shunji Yanai; Boualem Bouguetaia; Tomas Heidar; Neeru Chadha; Judges ad hoc Bernard Oxman and Nicolaas Schrijver

Case opinions
- 2021: joint declaration (Oxman, Schrijver); separate and dissenting opinion (Oxman); 2023: declarations (Paik, Heidar, Schrijver)

Keywords
- Exclusive economic zone; continental shelf; low-tide elevation; Chagos Archipelago sovereignty dispute

The Dispute concerning Delimitation of the Maritime Boundary between Mauritius and Maldives in the Indian Ocean (Mauritius/Maldives) was a case before a special chamber of the International Tribunal for the Law of the Sea (ITLOS). It concerned the boundary between the exclusive economic zones and continental shelves of the Maldives and the Chagos Archipelago, which Mauritius claims as its territory. The United Kingdom, which administers the archipelago as the British Indian Ocean Territory, was not a party.

The Maldives argued that the special chamber could not delimit the boundary without deciding the sovereignty dispute between Mauritius and the United Kingdom. In its judgment of 28 January 2021, the special chamber rejected all five of the Maldives' preliminary objections. Relying on the 2019 advisory opinion of the International Court of Justice (ICJ) and General Assembly resolution 73/295, it held that Mauritius "can be regarded as the coastal State in respect of the Chagos Archipelago for the purpose of the delimitation of a maritime boundary even before the process of the decolonization of Mauritius is completed".

In its judgment on the merits of 28 April 2023, the special chamber unanimously drew a single maritime boundary within 200 nautical miles of both states. It declined to give base points to Blenheim Reef, a low-tide elevation north of the Salomon Islands atoll, but gave the reef half effect as a relevant circumstance. It held that it had jurisdiction over the continental shelf beyond 200 nautical miles, but declined to delimit that area because there was "significant uncertainty" about Mauritius' entitlement there.

== Background ==
=== Geography ===
The Chagos Archipelago is a group of islands, banks and reefs in the central Indian Ocean. According to Mauritius, it lies 1,188 nautical miles north-east of the island of Mauritius and, at its closest point, 269 nautical miles south of the Maldives. The Maldives is an archipelago of 1,190 coral islands in 26 atolls, whose southernmost territory is Addu Atoll. Both states have declared themselves archipelagic states under the United Nations Convention on the Law of the Sea (UNCLOS).

=== Sovereignty dispute ===
The United Kingdom detached the Chagos Archipelago from the colony of Mauritius in 1965 and has administered it since then as the British Indian Ocean Territory. According to the Maldives, "since at least 1980, Mauritius has claimed that it is sovereign over the Chagos Archipelago". In 2015 an arbitral tribunal in Mauritius v United Kingdom found that it lacked jurisdiction over Mauritius' sovereignty claims. On 25 February 2019 the ICJ advised that the decolonisation of Mauritius "was not lawfully completed" in 1968 and that the United Kingdom was under an obligation to end its administration of the archipelago "as rapidly as possible". On 22 May 2019 the general assembly adopted resolution 73/295, demanding the United Kingdom's withdrawal within six months; the Maldives and the United Kingdom voted against. The United Kingdom did not act on that demand within the period set.

=== Maritime claims ===
Mauritius declared a 200-nautical-mile exclusive economic zone in its Maritime Zones Act of 1977, reaffirmed in 2005. The Maldives declared its own zone in 1976 and redefined it in its Maritime Zones Act of 1996. The special chamber found that the two states' claims "overlap". According to Mauritius, it deposited archipelagic baselines for the Chagos Archipelago with the Secretary-General of the United Nations on 26 July 2006, including three base points on Blenheim Reef.

In June 2001 Mauritius proposed negotiations on the continental shelf around the archipelago. The Maldives replied that, "as jurisdiction over the Chagos Archipelago is not exercised by the Government of Mauritius", it would be "inappropriate to initiate any discussions". On 26 July 2010 the Maldives made a submission to the Commission on the Limits of the Continental Shelf (CLCS) for an extended continental shelf. At a meeting in Malé on 21 October 2010, the Maldivian side acknowledged that the submission had not taken into account the coordinates of Mauritius' exclusive economic zone "in the Chagos region", and said that "this would be rectified by an addendum". In a joint communiqué of 12 March 2011, the two governments "agreed to make bilateral arrangements on the overlapping area of extended continental shelf of the two States around the Chagos Archipelago". No addendum was filed, and on 24 March 2011 Mauritius formally protested against the Maldives' submission "in as much as the Extended Continental Shelf being claimed by ... Maldives encroaches on the Exclusive Economic Zone of ... Mauritius".

After the advisory opinion, on 7 March 2019, Mauritius invited the Maldives to a second round of talks; the Maldives did not respond. At the 2019 General Assembly debate, the Maldives said that resolution 73/295 "prejudges the implications" of its 2010 submission to the CLCS.

== Proceedings ==
=== Institution and the Special Chamber ===
On 18 June 2019 Mauritius instituted arbitral proceedings against the Maldives under Annex VII of UNCLOS. After consultations with the president of ITLOS in Hamburg on 17 September 2019, the two states concluded a special agreement on 24 September 2019 to transfer the case to a special chamber of the tribunal. The case was entered in the list of cases as Case No. 28.

By an order of 27 September 2019, the tribunal formed a special chamber of nine judges: Paik Jin-hyun as president, José Luís Jesus, Jean-Pierre Cot, Shunji Yanai, Boualem Bouguetaia, Tomas Heidar and Neeru Chadha, with two judges ad hoc. The Maldives chose Bernard Oxman and Mauritius chose Nicolaas Schrijver as judges ad hoc. After Judge Cot resigned in August 2020, the parties agreed that Stanisław Pawlak should replace him.

Mauritius was represented by its solicitor-general, Dheerendra Kumar Dabee, as agent, and later also by its permanent representative to the United Nations, Jagdish Koonjul, as co-agent. Its counsel included Philippe Sands. The Maldives was represented by its attorney general, Ibrahim Riffath, as agent; its counsel included Payam Akhavan and Alan Boyle.

=== Preliminary objections phase ===
On 18 December 2019 the Maldives filed preliminary objections to jurisdiction and admissibility, which suspended the proceedings on the merits. Because of the COVID-19 pandemic, the hearing was moved from June to October 2020 and held in a "hybrid format", with judges and counsel taking part in person or remotely. The Maldives objected to the judges ad hoc taking part "by different means", arguing that this "could potentially undermine the fairness of the proceedings". Mauritius opposed the request, and the president of the special chamber said that the hybrid format "is based on the premise that there is no difference between the two modes of participation". Four public sittings were held between 13 and 19 October 2020.

== Judgment on preliminary objections (2021) ==
The Maldives raised five objections:

1. the United Kingdom was an indispensable third party that had not consented to the proceedings;
2. the special chamber had no jurisdiction to decide the disputed sovereignty over the Chagos Archipelago, which it would have to do to decide Mauritius' claims;
3. the two states had not engaged, and could not meaningfully engage, in the negotiations required by articles 74 and 83 of UNCLOS;
4. there was no dispute between them over a maritime boundary; and
5. Mauritius' claims were an abuse of process.

=== Indispensable third party and sovereignty ===
The Maldives relied on the Monetary Gold principle, under which a court cannot decide a case whose very subject matter would be the legal interests of a state that is not a party. It argued that the situation was "strikingly similar" to the ICJ's East Timor case, and that "the context of decolonization is simply irrelevant". Mauritius replied that the United Kingdom "has no legal interest in the Chagos Archipelago", because the ICJ had already determined that it had "no sovereignty, or sovereign rights, in respect of any part of the Chagos Archipelago". It described British statements of continued sovereignty as "a defiant political statement by a recalcitrant State".

The special chamber considered that the parties' disagreement "boils down to the question as to whether a sovereignty dispute between Mauritius and the United Kingdom over the Chagos Archipelago still exists or has been resolved", and examined the first two objections together. It assessed three sources in turn.

The 2015 arbitral award. The special chamber found that the award was "of some relevance". Although the arbitral tribunal had been unable to address sovereignty, it had recognised Mauritius' rights under the United Kingdom's 1965 undertakings, including fishing rights, the return of the archipelago "when no longer needed for defence purposes" and the benefit of any minerals or oil. It rejected the Maldives' argument that the award had found, with res judicata effect, that the United Kingdom could act as coastal state until the sovereignty dispute was resolved.

The advisory opinion. The special chamber considered that the ICJ's determinations "have unmistakable implications for the United Kingdom's claim to sovereignty", which was "contrary to the determinations made by the ICJ". The ICJ's statement that the United Kingdom must respect "the territorial integrity of that country, including the Chagos Archipelago" could, in its view, "be interpreted as suggesting Mauritius' sovereignty over the Chagos Archipelago". The special chamber accepted that advisory opinions "cannot be considered legally binding". It drew "a distinction between the binding character and the authoritative nature" of an opinion, holding that "judicial determinations made in advisory opinions carry no less weight and authority than those in judgments". It concluded that the determinations in the Chagos opinion "cannot be disregarded simply because the advisory opinion is not binding" and that they "do have legal effect".

Resolution 73/295. The special chamber recalled that general assembly resolutions are generally recommendatory. It held, however, that resolution 73/295 was "relevant to assessing the legal status of the Chagos Archipelago", given the role the ICJ had given the Assembly in completing the decolonisation of Mauritius. It treated the six-month demand as one of the "modalities" for completing decolonisation. In its view, "the fact that the time-limit set by the General Assembly has passed without the United Kingdom complying with the demand further strengthens" its finding on the British claim. It rejected Mauritius' argument that paragraphs 6 and 7 of the resolution, which call on international organisations not to recognise the British Indian Ocean Territory, applied to the special chamber itself.

On the existence of a sovereignty dispute, the special chamber accepted that there "had been a long-standing sovereignty dispute". It held, however, that if the ICJ had determined the archipelago to be part of Mauritius, the continued British claim "cannot be considered anything more than 'a mere assertion'". It distinguished the Coastal State Rights arbitration between Ukraine and Russia over Crimea: that tribunal had not had "the benefit of prior authoritative determination" of the sovereignty issues "by any judicial body". It summarised its findings by stating that "Mauritius' sovereignty over the Chagos Archipelago can be inferred from the ICJ's determinations".

On that basis, the special chamber held that it was "inconceivable" that the United Kingdom, "whose administration over the Chagos Archipelago constitutes a wrongful act of a continuing character", could have any legal interest in the delimitation of maritime zones around the archipelago. It concluded that the United Kingdom was not an indispensable party. It held that Mauritius could be regarded as the coastal state, a conclusion "consistent with ... the determinations made in the Chagos advisory opinion which were acted upon by UNGA resolution 73/295".

=== Negotiations, existence of a dispute and abuse of process ===
On the third objection, the special chamber held that articles 74 and 83 entail "an obligation to negotiate in good faith", which "does not require the States concerned to reach such agreement". It found that Mauritius had tried "on several occasions" to negotiate, while the Maldives "for most of the time, refused to negotiate with Mauritius". By not answering the invitation of March 2019, the Maldives had made it clear "that there was nothing more that Mauritius could have accomplished". On the fourth objection, it found that the Maldives' extended continental shelf claim overlapped with Mauritius' exclusive economic zone, and that Mauritius' 2011 protest showed that the parties "clearly hold opposite views". It added that a dispute could also be inferred from the Maldives' failure to respond to the 2019 invitation.

On the fifth objection, the Maldives argued that, having failed in its arbitration against the United Kingdom, Mauritius was trying to obtain a ruling on sovereignty in proceedings against a third state. Mauritius replied that it was the Maldives that was acting against the advisory opinion and resolution 73/295, and that "[i]f any party has committed an abuse of process, it is the Maldives". The special chamber found that Mauritius' claims were "confined to articles 74 and 83 of the Convention" and did not constitute an abuse of process.

=== Decision ===
The special chamber found that it had jurisdiction over the boundary dispute and that Mauritius' claim was admissible. It deferred to the merits the questions of how far it could exercise that jurisdiction, "including questions arising under article 76" (the continental shelf beyond 200 nautical miles). The votes were:

| Operative paragraph | Decision | Vote |
|---|---|---|
| (1) | First objection (indispensable third party) rejected | Unanimous |
| (2) | Second objection (disputed sovereignty) rejected | 8–1 |
| (3) | Third objection (negotiations) rejected | 8–1 |
| (4) | Fourth objection (no dispute) rejected | Unanimous |
| (5) | Fifth objection (abuse of process) rejected | Unanimous |
| (6) | Jurisdiction and admissibility upheld; extent of jurisdiction deferred to the merits | 8–1 |
| (7) | Claim concerning provisional arrangements reserved to the merits | Unanimous |

Judge ad hoc Oxman voted against operative paragraphs (2), (3) and (6).

=== Separate opinions ===
In his separate and dissenting opinion, Judge ad hoc Oxman considered that Mauritius' request for a permanent maritime boundary was "not yet admissible". He observed that the case was before the special chamber not because of a disagreement over how to divide the overlapping areas, but "because one of the Parties has declined to proceed with delimitation negotiations". In his view, articles 74 and 83 should not require a state to negotiate a permanent boundary "when it declines to do so on the grounds that this would require it to become entangled in a disagreement between other States". He considered that the Maldives' position "merits respect for important reasons of public order". He also found it difficult to reconcile the special chamber's conclusion with "a cautious view of the legally binding effect of the ICJ advisory opinion" and with "a restrained view of the Special Chamber's jurisdiction to pronounce on rights to land territory".

In a joint declaration, Judges ad hoc Oxman and Schrijver welcomed the deferral of the questions under article 76 to the merits. They noted that the reservation of Mauritius' claim on provisional arrangements did "not call into question the duty of the Parties" under paragraph 3 of articles 74 and 83.

== Merits phase ==
=== Written and oral proceedings ===
Mauritius filed its memorial on 25 May 2021 and the Maldives its counter-memorial on 25 November 2021. They were followed by a reply on 14 April 2022 and a rejoinder on 15 August 2022. In its memorial, Mauritius dropped its claim that the Maldives had breached its obligation to seek provisional arrangements. The special chamber declined a request by the "Chagossian Committee Seychelles" to file submissions as amicus curiae.

In early 2022 Mauritius carried out a survey of Blenheim Reef, the Salomon Islands atoll and the surrounding waters. It asked for its survey vessel to depart from and return to Gan in the Maldives. The Maldives said that it would allow this, subject to conditions and without prejudice to its right to challenge the evidence. Mauritius called the conditions "unacceptable" and made other arrangements, then claimed the extra costs from the Maldives.

In August and September 2022 the president of the Maldives and the prime minister of Mauritius exchanged letters. According to Mauritius, the Maldives had decided to "change its position" on resolution 73/295 and had given an assurance that it would vote "yes" to a future general assembly resolution giving effect to the advisory opinion. Mauritius therefore dropped its claim for the survey costs. The Maldives confirmed that it would vote yes to "the forthcoming resolution", which it described as a way of leaving behind the difficulties arising from Mauritius' 2011 protest against its CLCS submission. The special chamber placed "on record the goodwill of the Parties" in resolving the issue.

Seven public sittings were held from 17 to 24 October 2022. Mauritius welcomed the special chamber's suggestion that it might appoint experts on scientific and technical questions. The Maldives called this "clearly unnecessary and manifestly inconsistent with principles of procedural fairness", and the special chamber decided not to appoint experts.

== Judgment on the merits (2023) ==
=== Delimitation within 200 nautical miles ===
The parties agreed on the method: an equidistance line, adjusted for any relevant circumstances and then checked for disproportion. The special chamber found the relevant coasts to be about 40.3 km for Mauritius (including Blenheim Reef) and 39.0 km for the Maldives. The parties agreed on the Maldivian base points on Addu Atoll. They differed on four base points placed by Mauritius on Blenheim Reef, which they described as the "central dispute" of the case.

==== Blenheim Reef ====
The special chamber accepted that Blenheim Reef, as a low-tide elevation partly within 12 nautical miles of an island of the Salomon Islands atoll, could be used as a baseline for measuring Mauritius' maritime zones. It did not consider that there was "a general rule which requires that a low-tide elevation be disregarded in selecting base points". It noted, however, that international courts had "rarely placed base points on a low-tide elevation", and said it would be hesitant to do so "unless there is a convincing reason". The parties agreed that base points on the reef would control almost half of the provisional line and give Mauritius about 4,690 km², or 4.9 per cent of the area of overlap. Mauritius called this effect "extremely modest" and the Maldives "extraordinarily disproportionate". The special chamber considered it "by no means insubstantial". It concluded that Blenheim Reef "is not a site for appropriate base points", and that Mauritius' alternative arguments based on its archipelagic baselines did not change that finding. It found that the reef consists of "a number of low-tide elevations, many of which are situated beyond 12 nm of Île Takamaka". Only a low-tide elevation situated wholly or partly within that limit could therefore be used to measure Mauritius' 200-nautical-mile limit.

==== The boundary ====
The provisional equidistance line was drawn from 16 base points on Peros Banhos and the Salomon Islands and 31 on Addu Atoll. At the second stage, the special chamber found that "ignoring Blenheim Reef completely would not lead to an equitable solution", given the "extensive areas of drying reefs" shown by Mauritius' survey. It treated the reef as a relevant circumstance. It adjusted the eastern part of the line to give the reef half effect. The resulting boundary runs from west to east through 38 points, between the two places where the parties' 200-nautical-mile limits intersect.

The relevant area was about 92,563 km². The line allocated 45,331 km² to Mauritius and 47,232 km² to the Maldives, a ratio of 1:0.960, against a coastal-length ratio of 1:1.033. The special chamber found "no significant disproportion". Because the boundary left no area to be delimited within either party's 200-nautical-mile limit, the Maldives' claim to an extended continental shelf within Mauritius' 200-nautical-mile zone became moot.

=== Continental shelf beyond 200 nautical miles ===
Mauritius claimed an extended continental shelf in what it called the "Northern Chagos Archipelago Region". It asked for the overlapping area to be divided equally along an azimuth of 55 degrees. The Maldives raised four objections. The special chamber held that the claim was not a "new dispute" and fell within its jurisdiction. It also rejected the objection that Mauritius' CLCS submission, filed in April 2022, was out of time.

Mauritius put forward three routes for the natural prolongation of its land territory to a critical foot-of-slope point. The special chamber held that the first was legally impermissible, because "a coastal State cannot validly claim an entitlement to a continental shelf beyond 200 nm based on the natural prolongation through another State's uncontested continental shelf". The other two routes crossed the Chagos Trough, via the Gardiner Seamounts or an "elevated saddle". On those, the parties fundamentally disagreed on scientific and technical issues, and the special chamber found "significant uncertainty". It therefore declined to determine Mauritius' entitlement or to delimit beyond 200 nautical miles. It said that caution was needed where "there may be a risk of prejudice to the interests of the international community in the Area and the common heritage principle".

The special chamber noted an impasse at the CLCS: neither party had consented to the commission considering the other's submission, so neither could obtain recommendations and establish final outer limits. It encouraged both parties "to contemplate giving their consent".

=== Decision ===
All four operative paragraphs were adopted unanimously. The special chamber:

1. fixed the single maritime boundary within 200 nautical miles;
2. found that its jurisdiction included the continental shelf beyond 200 nautical miles;
3. rejected the Maldives' objection that Mauritius' CLCS submission was untimely; and
4. found that it was "not in a position to determine the entitlement of Mauritius to the continental shelf beyond 200 nm in the Northern Chagos Archipelago Region", and would therefore not delimit the shelf beyond 200 nautical miles.

=== Declarations ===
Judge Paik cautioned against reading the judgment as meaning that a tribunal "should necessarily refrain from proceeding to delimitation" whenever the parties disagree about entitlement beyond 200 nautical miles. He also warned against being "overly hesitant to enlist the assistance of experts". Judge Heidar welcomed the "significant uncertainty" standard as "an important contribution to the jurisprudence", but considered that an expert opinion should have been arranged. Judge ad hoc Schrijver considered that Blenheim Reef was a single feature rather than several low-tide elevations. He also noted that low-lying features of both states faced "a significant risk of sea-level rise".

== See also ==
- Chagos Archipelago sovereignty dispute
- Legal Consequences of the Separation of the Chagos Archipelago from Mauritius in 1965
- United Nations General Assembly Resolution 73/295
- Mauritius v United Kingdom

== Sources ==
Judgments and opinions

- Dispute concerning delimitation of the maritime boundary between Mauritius and Maldives in the Indian Ocean (Mauritius/Maldives), Preliminary Objections, Judgment (PDF). ITLOS Reports 2020–2021. International Tribunal for the Law of the Sea. 28 January 2021. p. 17.
- Oxman, Bernard H.; Schrijver, Nicolaas J. (28 January 2021). Joint Declaration of Judges ad hoc Oxman and Schrijver (PDF). International Tribunal for the Law of the Sea.
- Oxman, Bernard H. (28 January 2021). Separate and Dissenting Opinion of Judge ad hoc Oxman (PDF). International Tribunal for the Law of the Sea.
- Dispute concerning delimitation of the maritime boundary between Mauritius and Maldives in the Indian Ocean (Mauritius/Maldives), Judgment (PDF). International Tribunal for the Law of the Sea. 28 April 2023.
- Paik, Jin-Hyun (28 April 2023). Declaration of Judge Paik, President of the Special Chamber (PDF). International Tribunal for the Law of the Sea.
- Heidar, Tomas (28 April 2023). Declaration of Judge Heidar (PDF). International Tribunal for the Law of the Sea.
- Schrijver, Nicolaas J. (28 April 2023). Declaration of Judge ad hoc Schrijver (PDF). International Tribunal for the Law of the Sea.

Other documents

- Special Agreement and Notification between the Republic of Mauritius and the Republic of Maldives (PDF) (Report). International Tribunal for the Law of the Sea. 24 September 2019.
- United Nations General Assembly (22 May 2019). Official Records, Seventy-third session, 83rd plenary meeting, Wednesday, 22 May 2019, 10 a.m. (A/73/PV.83) (Report). United Nations.
