= Dolliver =

Dolliver can refer to:

- Dolliver, Iowa
- Dolliver Nelson (1932–2016), Grenadian jurist
- James Dolliver (disambiguation), multiple people
- Jonathan P. Dolliver (1858–1910), American politician and orator
