= Trinidad & Tobago National Petroleum Marketing Company Limited =

National Petroleum Marketing Company
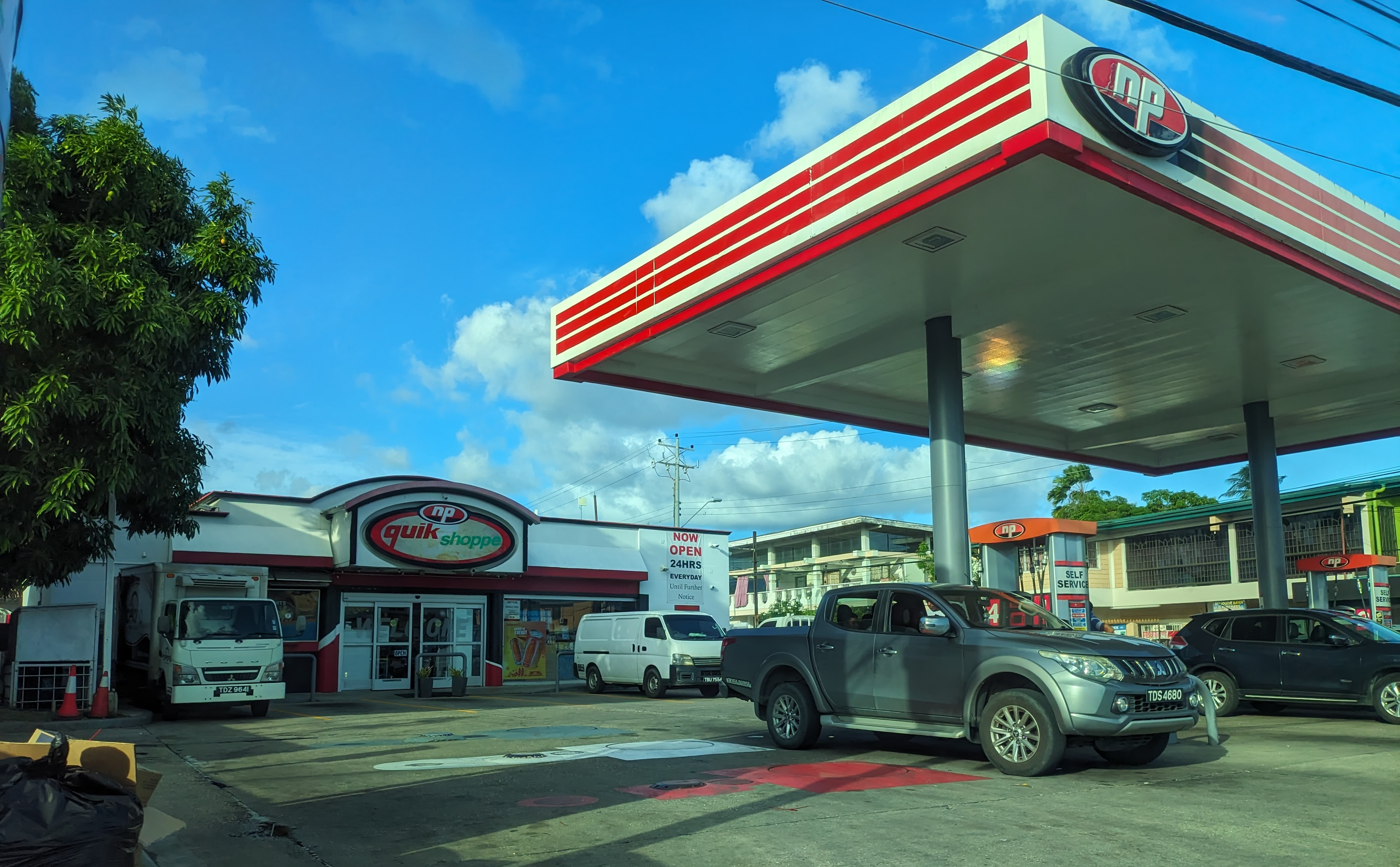
- NP gas station on the Eastern Main Road, Tacarigua
- Type: Government-owned corporation
- Industry: Refined petroleum
- Founded: 1972
- Headquarters: Sea lots, City of Port of Spain, Trinidad and Tobago
- Products: Gasoline; Diesel fuel Lubricants; Convenience stores Liquefied petroleum gas Aviation fuel Bunker fuel
- Website: www.np.co.tt

The National Petroleum Marketing Company, better known by its brand name National Petroleum (NP), is a state-owned refined petroleum distribution and marketing company owned by the government of Trinidad and Tobago. From its inception in 1972 until 1999, NP was the sole government-authorized distributor of gasoline, diesel fuel, and other consumer refined petroleum products in the island nation. The company has since expanded into lubricants, liquified petroleum gas, aviation fuel, and bunker fuel.

== Corporate history ==
In 1969, the government of Trinidad and Tobago (T&T) formed a joint venture, Trinidad Tesoro, with Tesoro Corporation to purchase the assets of BP Caribbean, which was shutting down its operations in the region. The Petroleum Product Act of 1969 made Trinidad Tesoro the only wholesale gasoline and diesel fuel supplier in T&T. In 1972, Trinidad Tesoro's retail filling station network was turned over to a newly created government-owned corporation, National Petroleum. The following year, NP purchased half of the assets of Esso in T&T. It acquired the marketing and distribution assets of the Trinidad and Tobago Oil Company (formerly Shell Trinidad) in August 1974, and became the sole government authorized distributor of refined petroleum in the country in 1976. It bought the assets of Texaco Trinidad in 1977, adding to its distribution network. (Tesoro's interest in the retail filling stations was purchased by the government in 1986.)

NP also marketed and distributed refined petroleum products manufactured by another state-owned corporation, Petrotrin. Due to extreme mismanagement, Petrotin was shuttered in 2018 and broken into four companies. In 1981, NP launched the National Petroleum brand of lubricants.

The national government passed new legislation in 1999 allowing a new private corporation, the United Independent Petroleum Marketing Company (Unipet), to market wholesale fuel (but required it to buy its fuel from Petronin). In 2002, Unipet began delivering its fuel to its own four filling stations.

By 2016, NP owned more than 200 consumer automotive filling stations. Nearly all its filling stations contained a Quik Shoppe convenience store. Quik Shoppes sold groceries, soft drinks, beer and wine, and snack items, and most also offered a quick-service restaurant.

By the end of 2019, NP had four main businesses: Retail sales of automotive fuel, the manufacture of lubricants, the wholesale and retail sale of liquefied petroleum gas (LPG), and the sale of aviation fuel and bunker fuel.

A scandal engulfed NP in January 2020 when the Trinidad and Tobago Guardian revealed that NP had lost more than US$500,000 investing in Black Gold, a bunker fuel distributor. According to Bernard Mitchell, NP's chief executive officer, individuals in the national government ordered NP to invest in Black Gold even though neither the officers nor owners of the company could be identified. NP's finance and legal staff opposed the investment, and NP's board of directors refused to approve the deal. The newspaper said unnamed government officials ordered it to go ahead anyway.

In October 2020, the government said it would explore the sale of NP's network of filling stations and convenience stores. Former NP executives said that 75 of the 113 filling stations were owned by NP, while the rest were franchises. The filling stations and convenience stores accounted for 70 percent of NP's annual gross revenues. The sale was widely opposed, as it would essentially strip NP of its assets.

== See also ==
List of NP brands

== Bibliography ==
- McGuire, Gregory (January 2007). Competition in Energy Markets: Trinidad and Tobago Case Study (PDF) (Report). Latin American Energy Organization (OLADE).
