= Kamga =

Kamga is a surname. Notable people with the surname include:

- Aurélie Kamga (born 1985), French sprinter
- Joseph Kamga (born 1957), Cameroonian footballer
- Julien Kamga (born 1987), Banker
- Maurice Kamga, lawyer
- Vanessa Kamga (born 1998), Swedish athlete
