= Gillian Lucky =

Trinidad and Tobago politician (born 1967)

Justice of Appeal at the Supreme Court of Judicature for Trinidad and Tobago
- Incumbent
- Assumed office 27 January 2020

High Court Judge at the Supreme Court of Judicature for Trinidad and Tobago
- In office 8 September 2014 – 27 January 2020

Gillian Lucky (born 1967) is a Justice of Appeal at the Supreme Court of Judicature for Trinidad and Tobago. She was previously a High Court Judge, Director of the Police Complaints Authority, and a Member of Parliament for Pointe-à-Pierre.

== Early life ==
Lucky is the daughter of Anthony Lucky and Cintra Lucky. She has three siblings, Cindy Ann Lucky, Elizabeth Lucky and Antonia Lucky. She is a former competitive calypsonian. She attended Naparima Girls' High School.

== Career ==
She received her LLB from the University of the West Indies in 1989 with upper second class honours and was awarded the Therese Sylvester Prize for the Most Outstanding University Student at the Cave Hill Campus. She attended the Hugh Wooding Law School, receiving her Legal Education Certificate, and was called to the bar in 1991. She started her legal career working as an associate for De Nobriga, Inniss & Company in Port of Spain.

In 1993, Lucky became Senior State Counsel at the Office of the Director of Public Prosecutions. She prosecuted cases at the Magistrates’ Court of Trinidad and Tobago, including the trial of Nankissoon Boodram. Lucky also lectured in business law and assisted with the distance learning programme at UWI from 1990 to 2001. She also formerly held the position of Principal at the Academy of Tertiary Studies (ATS).

=== Member of Parliament ===
She joined the Parliament of Trinidad and Tobago as a Government Senator from 12 January 2001 to 1 February 2001, when she became a Minister for the Ministry of the Attorney General and Legal Affairs until 24 December 2001. She then served as an opposition member for the Senate from 5 April 2002 to 28 August 2002.

Lucky was then elected to the House of Representatives as an opposition Member of Parliament for Pointe-à-Pierre between 17 October 2002 and 28 September 2007. She originally ran as a member of the United National Congress but in April 2005, she became an independent UNC member and in September 2006, she joined the new Congress of the People party. She was also the chairman of the Omnibus Legislation Committee, Chairman of the Committee for the Regularization of the Home Video Industry and a Member of the Crime and Justice Commission.

=== Director of the Police Complaints Authority ===
Lucky was the first Director of the Police Complaints Authority from December 2010 to 2 September 2014. She led investigations into an accident at Sea Lots, the police shooting of three Moruga residents in July 2011, and the running of the New Flying Squad unit.

It is an independent body formed to investigate criminal offences involving police officers, police corruption and serious police misconduct and for other related matters. No member of the Police Complaints Authority's staff is attached to the Trinidad and Tobago Police Service, Special Reserve Police or Municipal Police Force. The mandates of the PCA are outlined within the Police Complaints Authority Act.

=== Media work ===
Lucky has written as a columnist with the Trinidad and Tobago Guardian. She was also the host of a television show, Just Gill, on ieTV Channel 1 network, which is centered on discussion of national issues and interests. In the past, she co-hosted a radio segment, "Talk Time," on Radio 90.5FM, and is the former presenter and co-executive producer of the television programme, Caribbean Tarang.

=== Jurist ===
She was a temporary High Court judge from October 2009 to September 2010. Justice Lucky was sworn in as a permanent High Court puisine judge on 8 September 2014 by President Anthony Carmona. She became chairman of the Judicial Education Institute in January 2019.

On 27 January 2020, she was appointed a Justice of Appeal by President Paula-Mae Weekes.
