= Annestine Sealey =

Judge

Annestine Sealey is a judge of Trinidad and Tobago. She formerly served as principal of the Hugh Wooding Law School, until she was succeeded by Miriam Samaru.

== Career ==
Sealey graduated from Hugh Wooding Law School in 1979. Sealey was appointed a judge in her native country in 1990. She served as a judge for many years, becoming the second female judge of the Supreme Court of Judicature.

After her retirement, she sat on a number of commissions of inquiry investigating corruption in the country. She was appointed to the Judicial and Legal Service Commission from 1 April 2020. Beginning in January 2004, she headed the commission looking into the construction of Biche High School. In October 2004, Prime Minister Patrick Manning investigated accusations of corruption against Housing Minister Keith Rowley on the basis of Sealey's report, but changed his mind after Opposition Chief Whip Ganga Singh expressed concern.

In 2008, Sealey was appointed chairperson of the new Children's Authority. However, the operation of the authority was delayed for three years until she finally took up the position in 2011. Sealey expressed excitement over her new position, but also admitted to feeling "a little overwhelmed".
