= 1997 Trinidad and Tobago presidential election =

- 14 February 1997

67 members of the Parliament of Trinidad and Tobago 34 electoral votes needed to win
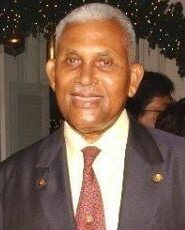
Nominee	A. N. R. Robinson	Anthony Lucky
Party	Independent	Independent
Electoral vote	46	18
President before election
Noor Hassanali
Independent
Elected President
A. N. R. Robinson
Independent

Indirect presidential elections were held in Trinidad and Tobago on 14 February 1997. It was the first time that there was a contested election for the position, as all previous presidents had been elected unopposed.

The election was held through an electoral college consisting of a joint sitting of the two houses of parliament.

The governing UNC-NAR coalition nominated the Minister of Government A. N. R. Robinson for the position, while the opposition People's National Movement nominated jurist Anthony Lucky.

== Results ==
Candidate	Party	Votes	%
A. N. R. Robinson	Independent	46	71.88
Anthony Lucky	Independent	18	28.12
Total		64	100.00
Valid votes		64	98.46
Invalid/blank votes		1	1.54
Total votes		65	100.00
Registered voters/turnout		67	97.01
