= Neeru Chadha =

Indian jurist

Judge Dr. Neeru Chadha
- Nīrū Caḍḍhā

Judge of the International Tribunal for the Law of the Sea
- Incumbent
- Assumed office 1 October 2017
- Nominated by: India
- Appointed by: Parties to the United Nations Convention on the Law of the Sea
- President: Vladimir Vladimirovich Golitsyn (2017); Jin-Hyun Paik (2017–)
- Vice President: Boualem Bouguetaia (2017); David Joseph Attard (2017–)

Personal details
- Born: Neeru Chadha; 27 March 1955 (age 71) Delhi, India
- Education: University of Delhi (LLM and PhD); University of Michigan Law School, University of Michigan (LLM)
- Occupation: Judge
- Profession: Jurist

Neeru Chadha (born 27 March 1955; IAST: Nīrū Caḍḍhā) is an Indian jurist who serves as a member of the International Tribunal for the Law of the Sea (ITLOS). She previously served in the Indian government's external affairs ministry as an additional secretary and legal adviser, heading its legal and treaties division, among other positions.

== Education ==
Chadha has master's degrees (LLM) in law from the University of Delhi and the University of Michigan Law School, and a doctorate (PhD) in law from the University of Delhi.

== Career ==
Chadha served in various positions for the Government of India, including as an additional secretary and legal adviser (AS&LA) in the Ministry of External Affairs, a legal consultant to the Government of India, counsellor and legal adviser for India's permanent mission to the United Nations, and joint secretary and legal adviser (JS&LA) in the external affairs ministry's legal and treaties division.

Chadha represented India in several international arbitration disputes, including serving as the Indian agent in Bay of Bengal Maritime Boundary Arbitration between Bangladesh and India case before the Permanent Court of Arbitration (PCA) in The Hague, as Indian agent for the Enrica Lexie Incident (Italy v. India) case before the International Tribunal for the Law of the Sea (ITLOS), as Indian agent for the Obligations concerning Negotiations relating to Cessation of the Nuclear Arms Race and to Nuclear Disarmament (Marshall Islands v. India) case before the International Court of Justice, as a co–Indian agent in the Indus Waters Kishenganga Arbitration (Pakistan v. India) case before the PCA, and as a member of the governing board of the South Asian Association for Regional Cooperation's arbitration council.

=== Judgeship at the International Tribunal for the Law of the Sea ===
Chadha was elected as a judge to the International Tribunal for the Law of the Sea, the United Nations' primary judicial organ for dealing with disputes related to international maritime law, in June 2015 for a nine-year term. Chadha was elected as one of two judges from the Asia-Pacific group, receiving 120 votes and being elected in the first round of voting itself, defeating candidates from Lebanon, Indonesia, and Thailand. She became the first Indian woman to be elected to a judgeship in the ITLOS, and the joint-second overall along with Liesbeth Lijnzaad of the Netherlands after Elsa Kelly of Argentina.

Chadha assumed office as a judge at the ITLOS in October 2017.
