= MV Saiga Cases =

The MV Saiga Cases describes two proceedings brought by Saint Vincent and the Grenadines against Guinea before the International Tribunal for the Law of the Sea (ITLOS) between 1997 and 1999. Both arose after Guinea arrested the oil tanker Saiga for supplying fuel to fishing vessels in its exclusive economic zone (EEZ), using force that injured crew members.

Case No. 1 concerned the prompt release of the vessel and crew, and was the first case in ITLOS's history.

Case No. 2 went beyond the release question to examine the underlying dispute in full, producing the tribunal's main rulings. The Tribunal found that Guinea had acted unlawfully in arresting the Saiga, and ordered it to pay over $2 million in compensation.

The case is best known for its ruling on ship nationality. Guinea had argued that the Saiga lacked a strong enough connection, or "genuine link," to its flag state to deserve recognition. ITLOS rejected this reasoning, arguing that a weak genuine link does not allow other states to challenge a ship's registration. The ruling is regarded as a foundational statement on ship nationality and the flags-of-convenience system, which allow shipowners to register vessels under minimal regulation.

== Background ==
The MV Saiga was a provisionally registered oil tanker under the flag of Saint Vincent and the Grenadines in March 1997. It was owned by Tabona Shipping Company Ltd. of Nicosia, Cyprus, managed by Seascot Shipmanagement Ltd. of Glasgow, Scotland, and chartered to Lemania Shipping Group Ltd. of Geneva, Switzerland. The vessel operated as a bunkering ship, supplying gasoil and water to foreign fishing vessels off the West African coast. On 27 October 1997, the Saiga refuelled three licensed fishing vessels within the exclusive economic zone of Guinea. The following day, Guinean customs patrol boats pursued the tanker onto the high seas. They arrested it within the EEZ of Sierra Leone. During the boarding, Guinean officers fired live ammunition without warning. The tanker was damaged and two crew and ship's personnel were injured, despite the crew offering no resistance. Guinean authorities detained the vessel in Conakry and confiscated its cargo. They also prosecuted the master, Captain Orlov, under domestic customs law leading to his conviction and a fine of over 15 billion Guinean francs.

== Procedural history ==
Saint Vincent and the Grenadines brought two successive proceedings against Guinea before ITLOS, unfolding as follows:

- 13 November 1997 — Saint Vincent and the Grenadines files an application under Article 292 of UNCLOS for the prompt release of the Saiga and its crew (Case No. 1). This is the first case ever submitted to ITLOS.
- 4 December 1997 — ITLOS orders Guinea to release the vessel and crew. Release is conditioned on a $400,000 bond and security for the confiscated gasoil.
- 17 December 1997 — Guinea convicts the Saiga's captain under domestic customs law, despite the release order.
- 22 December 1997 — Saint Vincent and the Grenadines serves notice of arbitration under Annex VII/Article 287 of UNCLOS.
- 13 January 1998 — Saint Vincent and the Grenadines requests provisional measures under Article 290.
- 20 February 1998 — The two states agree to transfer the arbitration to ITLOS. The case's commencement is backdated to 22 December 1997 (Case No. 2).
- 11 March 1998 — ITLOS orders Guinea to take no further judicial or administrative action against the vessel or crew pending the outcome.
- 8–20 March 1999 — The Tribunal holds oral hearings on the merits.
- 1 July 1999 — ITLOS delivers its final judgment. It finds Guinea's arrest of the Saiga unlawful and awards over $2.1 million ($2,123,357) in damages.

== Judgment ==
Case No. 1 concerned only the prompt release of the vessel and crew. The core of the dispute, however, was resolved in the Tribunal's decision for Case No. 2 on 1 July 1999.

=== Genuine link and nationality ===
An initial question before the Tribunal was whether Saint Vincent and the Grenadines had standing to bring the claim at all. Guinea challenged this by arguing that the Saiga lacked a "genuine link" to its flag state under Article 91 of UNCLOS. This provision is meant to ensure a real connection between a ship and the state under whose flag it sails. Since the vessel's owners, operators, and crew were not Vincentian nationals, Guinea argued that the flag state could not exercise effective control over the ship, and that this entitled other states to refuse to recognize its nationality.

The Tribunal rejected this argument. In paragraph 83 of the judgment, it held that:

"the purpose of the provisions of the Convention on the need for a genuine link between a ship and its flag State is to secure more effective implementation of the duties of the flag State, and not to establish criteria by reference to which the validity of the registration of ships may be challenged by other States."

On this basis, ITLOS held that other states cannot use the absence of a genuine link to deny recognition of a ship's nationality, or to challenge a flag state's right to bring a claim to court.

=== Jurisdiction, hot pursuit, and reparations ===
With admissibility settled, the Tribunal turned to the substance of Guinea's conduct: its jurisdiction to act, the lawfulness of its pursuit and use of force, and the resulting compensation.

The Tribunal held that Guinea had no right under UNCLOS to apply its customs and smuggling laws within the EEZ. In paragraph 127, it concluded that coastal states can only enforce customs laws within the territorial sea and the contiguous zone. It also rejected Guinea's argument that a customary right of "self-protection" or a "state of necessity" let it extend its fiscal control further out to protect tax revenue. This doctrine would only allow a state to break an obligation to protect an essential interest against a serious and immediate danger.

The Tribunal also found that Guinea's pursuit did not meet the requirements for lawful "hot pursuit" under Article 111. This article gives a coastal state the right to chase a foreign vessel onto the high seas after it breaks that state's laws. Since the Saiga had not broken any Guinean law that applied under UNCLOS, the pursuit had no legal basis. On top of that, the pursuit was not continuous, and it began on the high seas without the warning signals the law requires.

On the arrest itself, the Tribunal found that Guinean officials used excessive and unlawful force. They fired live ammunition at the unarmed, slow-moving tanker without first trying warning shots or other non-damaging measures. They kept firing even after boarding the ship, despite facing no resistance from the crew. This went against general international law and basic considerations of humanity.

ITLOS ordered Guinea to pay $2,123,357 in compensation, plus interest. The award followed the Chorzów Factory case, which requires a state that broke the law to fully repair the harm it caused. It covered clear, measurable harm caused directly by Guinea's actions: damage to the vessel, lost charter income, the confiscated gasoil, and the injured crew members' medical costs and suffering.

== Significance ==
Guinea's challenge to the vessel's flag was grounded in an existing legal debate. The genuine link concept in Article 91 was itself drawn from the Nottebohm Case (1955), which seemed to offer a straightforward comparison. In that case, the International Court of Justice defined nationality as "a legal bond having as its basis a social fact of attachment, a genuine connection of existence, interests and sentiments, together with the existence of reciprocal rights and duties". The case also carried an important consequence: a state could refuse to recognise someone's nationality if no genuine link existed.

Even before the Saiga cases, scholars disagreed on how far the Nottebohm Case applies to ships. Some argued that, just like a person, a ship without a real connection to its flag state should not have that nationality recognised by other states. Others argued this comparison does not work for ships, since a ship gains its link to a state simply by being registered there.

In Saiga (No. 2), ITLOS settled this debate for ship nationality. It held that the genuine link exists to make sure flag states carry out their duties properly, not to give other states grounds to challenge a ship's registration or deny its nationality. The ruling is seen as supporting open-registry states, which allow foreign shipowners to register vessels under their flag with minimal requirements. This same idea was later confirmed by a different court, the Court of Justice of the European Union, in the case of the European Commission versus the Hellenic Republic. That court agreed that even without a strong connection to its flag state, other countries still could not refuse to recognise a ship's nationality. Critics argue that without any real test attached to it, the genuine link rule does not actually accomplish much anymore. In their view, this allowed so-called flags of convenience to thrive, a system in which shipowners register their vessels in whichever country offers the loosest rules and lowest taxes, with little oversight to show for it.
