= Helmut Türk =

Austrian jurist

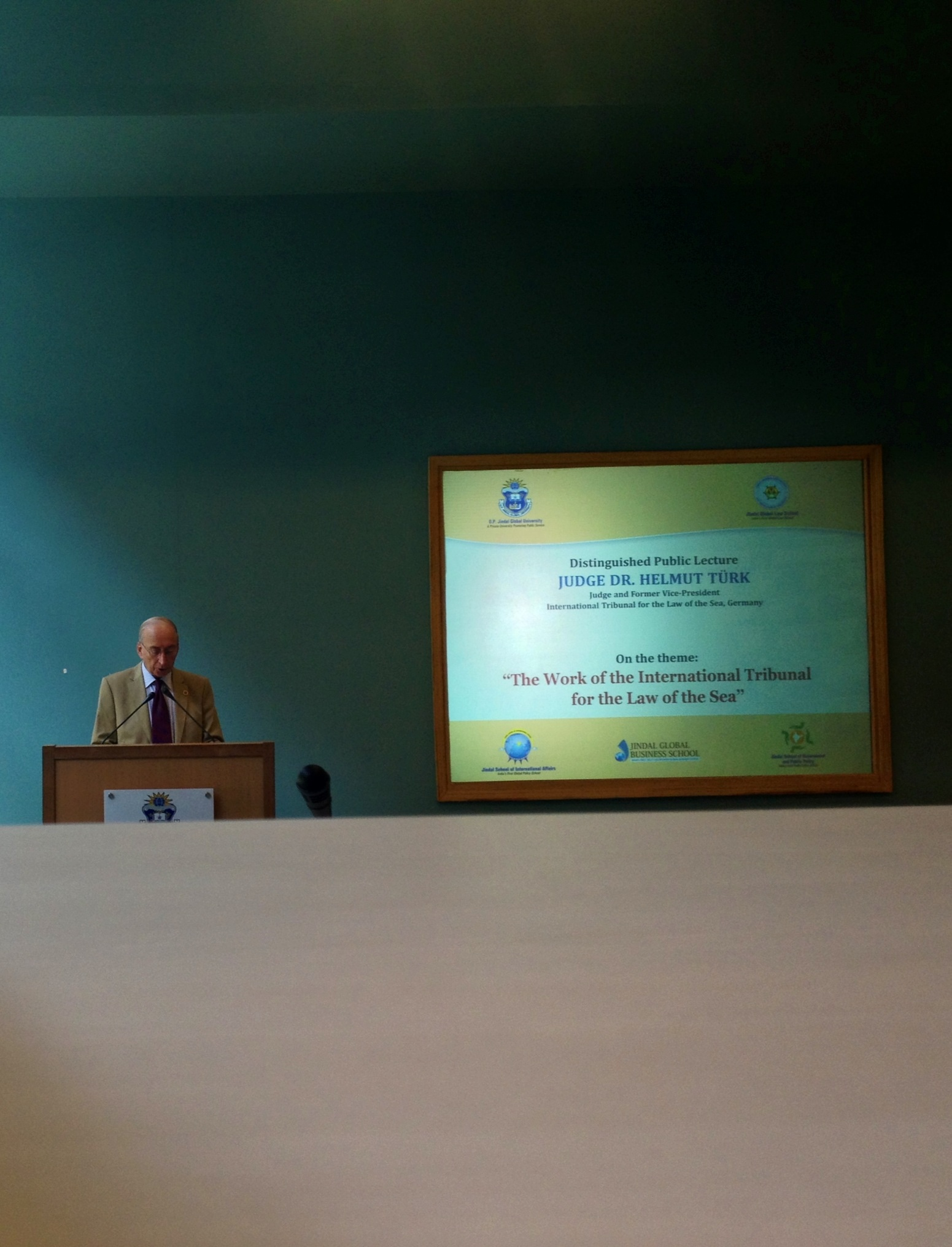
Judge Dr. Helmut Türk

Helmut Türk (born 24 April 1941 in Linz) is an Austrian jurist and a judge at the International Tribunal for the Law of the Sea.

He earned a doctorate of law at the University of Vienna in 1963 and attended the College of Europe in Bruges, Belgium 1963-1964. In 1965, he joined the Austrian foreign service. From 1993 to 1999, he was Ambassador to the United States and The Bahamas. He was chef de cabinet at the Präsidentschaftskanzlei from 1999 to 2004, and Ambassador to the Holy See and the Order of Malta from 2005 to 2006. On 1 October 2005, he was appointed as a judge at the International Tribunal for the Law of the Sea, and was the tribunal's vice president from 2008 to 2011.

== Works ==
- Österreich im Spannungsfeld von Neutralität und kollektiver Sicherheit. Verlag Österreich, Wien 1997, ISBN 3-7046-1129-8.
- Die Wende 1989/90 und die Obsoleterklärung einiger Artikel des Staatsvertrags. In: Arnold Suppan, Gerald Stourzh, Wolfgang Mueller (Hrsg.): Der Österreichische Staatsvertrag 1955 – Internationale Strategie, rechtliche Relevanz, nationale Identität. Verlag der Österreichischen Akademie der Wissenschaften, Wien 2005, ISBN 3-7001-3537-8, (Archiv für österreichische Geschichte 140), S. 821.
- Die Militärischen und Luftfahrt-Bestimmungen des Österreichischen Staatsvertrags und deren Obsoleszenz. In: Waldemar Hummer (Hrsg.): Staatsvertrag und immerwährende Neutralität Österreichs. Eine juristische Analyse. Verlag Österreich, Wien 2007, ISBN 978-3-7046-5099-3, S. 121.
- The Contribution of the International Tribunal for the Law of the Sea to International Law. In: Penn State International Law Review. 26, Nr. 2, Fall 2007, ISSN 1546-3435, S. 289.
- The Landlocked States and the Law of the Sea. In: Revue belge de droit international. 40, Nr. 1, 2007, ISSN 0035-0788, S. 91-112.
- Combating Terrorism at Sea – the Suppression of Unlawful Acts against the Safety of Maritime Navigation. In: University of Miami International and Comparative Law Review. 15, Special Issue Spring 2008, ISSN 1551-3289, S. 337-368.

== Lectures ==
- The Landlocked States and the Law of the Sea in the Lecture Series of the United Nations Audiovisual Library of International Law
- The Resurgence of Piracy: A Phenomenon of Modern Times in the Lecture Series of the United Nations Audiovisual Library of International Law
