= Elsa Kelly =

Argentine lawyer and diplomat (born 1939)

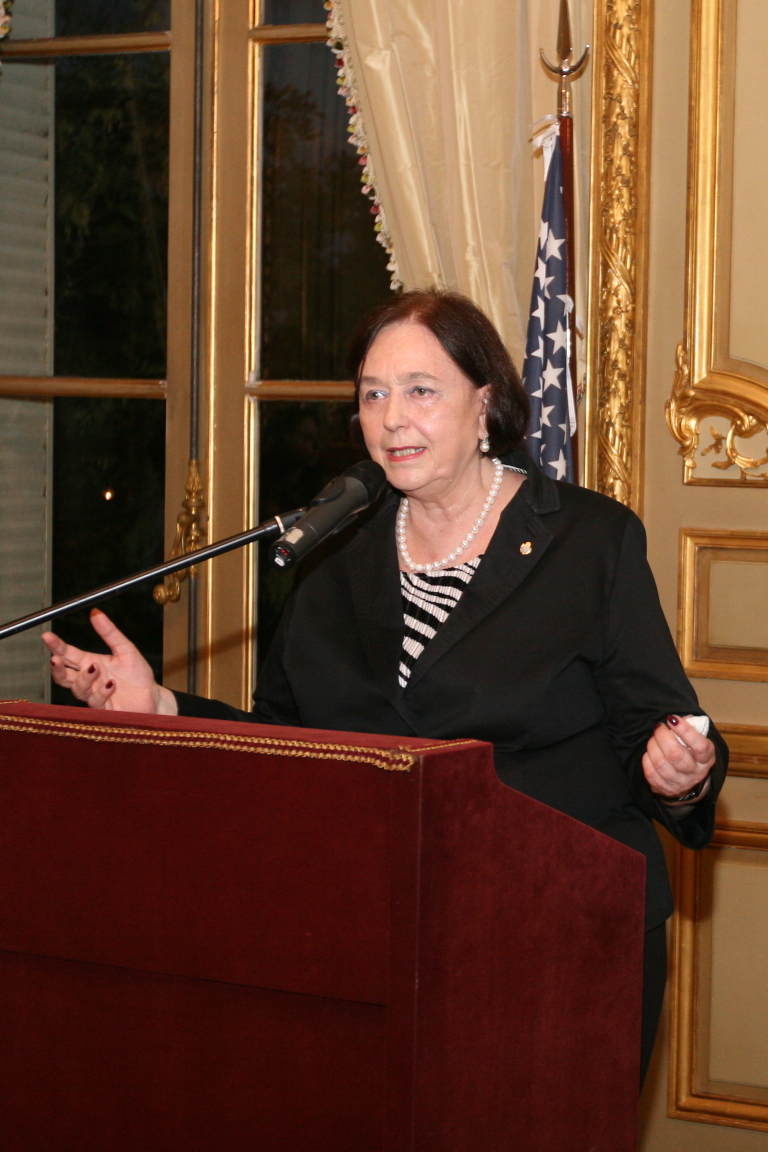
- Born: Elsa Rosa Diana Kelly; 28 February 1939 (age 87); Buenos Aires, Argentina
- Occupations: Diplomat; Lawyer

Elsa Rosa Diana Kelly (born 28 February 1939) is an Argentine lawyer and diplomat. She is currently a judge on the International Tribunal for the Law of the Sea as an expert. She held various positions within Argentine diplomacy and served as the ambassador to Italy, Austria and UNESCO.

== Biography ==
Kelly was born in the city of Buenos Aires on 23 February 1939. She graduated as a lawyer from the University of Buenos Aires in 1960, and was awarded a scholarship by the program of the Center for International Affairs at Harvard University. Kelly served as professor of public international law. She began her diplomatic career by entering the Instituto del Servicio Exterior de la Nación. Kelly became an ambassador in 1984. In the Ministry of Foreign Affairs and Worship, she held several positions, including member of the Higher Council of Ambassadors, director of cultural relations and director general of environmental affairs. She was named as deputy minister of foreign affairs under the government of Raúl Alfonsín.

Between 1985 and 1989, she represented Argentina to UNESCO in Paris. She was appointed ambassador to Italy, a position she held until 2003. Kelly served as an ambassador to Austria between 2003 and 2006. In 2010, Kelly was appointed by President Cristina Fernandez de Kirchner as national coordinator for the Global Nuclear Summit in Washington, D.C. During that year, her name was among the possible successors to Héctor Timerman as the ambassador to the United States, a position that nevertheless remained in the hands of Alfredo Chiaradía. Kelly was appointed a judge of the International Tribunal for the Law of the Sea on 1 October 2011, becoming the first woman among twenty members that make up the body. She will remain in office for a period of nine years.

== Awards ==
Kelly has been decorated by the Governments of Mexico, Ecuador and France (Academic Palms). In 2008, she received the Konex Award in the diplomat category, delivered by the Konex Foundation.
