= Maurice Kamga =

Diplomat and international law expert

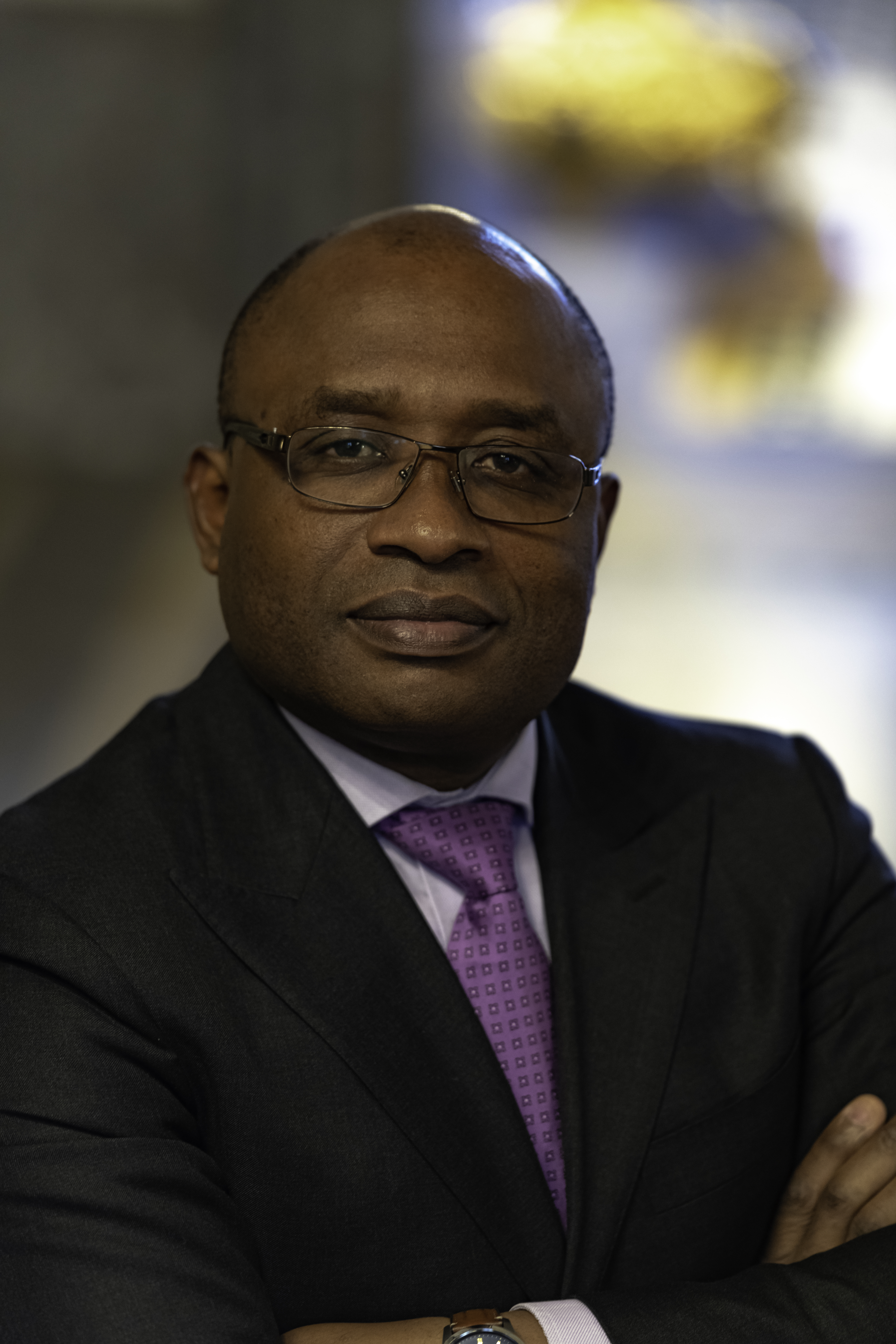
Maurice Kamga

Maurice Kamga is a diplomat (Minister Plenipotentiary), a judge and an academic of international law. His research focuses on the international law of the sea and the delimitation of maritime boundaries. He has been a judge at the International Tribunal for the Law of the Sea since 2020. He was previously Secretary of the International Court of Justice in The Hague.

Maurice Kamga was elected to International Tribunal for the Law of the Sea by the United Nations General Assembly on 26 August 2020.

After earning a degree law at the University of Yaoundé in 1989, he obtained a master's in public law also at the University of Yaoundé in 1990, a master’s in international relations at the International Relations Institute of Cameroon in 1991, and LLM in law again at the University of Yaoundé in 1991, and a PhD in international relations at the International Relations Institute of Cameroon in 1994. Abroad, he obtained a Diplôme d'études approfondies in international studies, with specialization in international law, from the Graduate Institute of International Studies in Geneva in 1997, and PhD in international law from the same institution in 2003. The Institute then dedicated to him a place in its Hall of Inspiring Stories.
