= Paik Jin-hyun =

South Korean judge (born 1958)

- 백진현

President of the International Tribunal for the Law of the Sea
- In office October 2, 2017 – October 1, 2020
- Preceded by: Vladimir Vladimirovich Golitsyn
- Succeeded by: Albert Hoffmann

Judge of the International Tribunal for the Law of the Sea
- In office March 6, 2009 – September 30, 2023
- Preceded by: Choon-ho Park

Personal details
- Born: 1 February 1958 (age 68) Busan, South Korea
- Education: Seoul National University, Columbia University, Cambridge University
- Occupation: Judge

Paik Jin-hyun (Korean: 백진현; Hanja: 白珍鉉; born 1 February 1958) is a South Korean judge and the President of the International Tribunal for the Law of the Sea from 2017 to 2020.

== Biography ==
Paik graduated from Seoul National University in 1980, later he entered both Columbia University and Cambridge University. Paik graduated from Cambridge in 1989 and was subsequently admitted to the bar of the State of New York. In March 2009, he became a member of the International Tribunal for the Law of the Sea. In October 2017, Paik became the tribunal's president.

Paik presided over a case relating to the Kerch Strait incident. On 25 May 2019 the tribunal decided that Russia must immediately release three captured ships and 24 captured Ukrainian servicemen.
