= Dolliver Nelson =

Grenadian jurist

L. Dolliver M. Nelson (27 June 1932 – 18 July 2016) was a Grenadian jurist. He was born in Sauteurs, Grenada. He received his BA from the University of the West Indies and further education at the London School of Economics. He served as the Vice President of the International Tribunal for the Law of the Sea from 1999 to 2002 and later its President from 2002 to 2005. He had also been a national justice in his native Grenada and served as a presiding arbiter for the Permanent Court of Arbitration.
