= James Dolliver =

James Dolliver may refer to:

- James I. Dolliver (1894–1978), U.S. Representative from Iowa
- James M. Dolliver (1924–2004), American lawyer, politician and Washington Supreme Court judge
