= Anthony Lucky =

Anthony Amos Lucky (born 11 May 1940) is a judge of the United Nations International Tribunal for the Law of the Sea. As a retired Court of Appeal Judge, Anthony served in the legal system of Trinidad and Tobago as a magistrate for ten years prior to becoming a judge for another 16 years. He is the recipient of the Chaconia Medal (Gold) for his long and meritorious service to Trinidad and Tobago.

== Family life ==
Lucky is the husband of Cintra Lucky, and has four daughters including Supreme Court judge Gillian Lucky. They each attended Naparima Girls' High School for their secondary school education and have since followed varying paths with respect to their tertiary education and careers.

== Education ==
Council of Legal Education, Gray's Inn, London (1958–61); Post Final Practical Training Certificate (1961); Diploma in International Relations, Institute of International Relations, University of the West Indies (1972–73); Master's degree in International Relations, Faculty of Social Sciences, University of the West Indies (1984); Certificate in Legislative Drafting, Commonwealth Secretariat.

== Professional experience ==
Private practice (1961–63); Legal Cadet, Attorney General's Department, Trinidad and Tobago (1963–64); Part-time Lecturer in Law, Extra-Mural Department, University of the West Indies (1963–66); Magistrate, Magistracy of Trinidad and Tobago (1964–74); Acting Secretary, Law Reform Commission, Law Commission, Trinidad and Tobago (1974–76); In-House Counsel, The Royal Bank of Trinidad and Tobago Limited (1976–77); Corporate Secretary and In-House Counsel, The Royal Bank of Trinidad and Tobago and Subsidiary Companies (1977–87); Legal Advisor, Royal Bank Trust Company, General Finance Corporation – Associated Companies of Royal Bank (1979–87); Secretary and Legal Advisor, Caribbean Banking Corporation, St. Vincent and the Grenadines (1984–87); Secretary and Legal Advisor, R & M Holdings, St. Vincent and the Grenadines (1984–87); Associate Tutor, Hugh Wooding Law School, Trinidad (1985–2000); admitted to practise as Barrister and Solicitor, St. Vincent and the Grenadines (1987); Judge of the Supreme Court of Trinidad and Tobago (1987–2003); Justice of Appeal in the Court of Appeal of Trinidad and Tobago (2000–03); Ombudsman for the Caribbean Association Council for Engineering and Technology (CACET) (2010–present).
