= International Tribunal for the Law of the Sea =

Intergovernmental organization

Coordinates: 53°33′04″N 9°51′03″E

International Tribunal for the Law of the Sea Tribunal international du droit de la mer (French)
- Official logo
- Location: Hamburg, Germany
- Working languages: English; French
- Judges from: 21 nations

Leaders
  - President: (Cameroon) Judge Maurice Kamga
  - Vice President: (Argentina) Judge Frida Maria Armas Pfirter

Establishment
  - UNCLOS adopted: 10 December 1982
  - UNCLOS in force: 16 November 1994
- Website https://www.itlos.org/

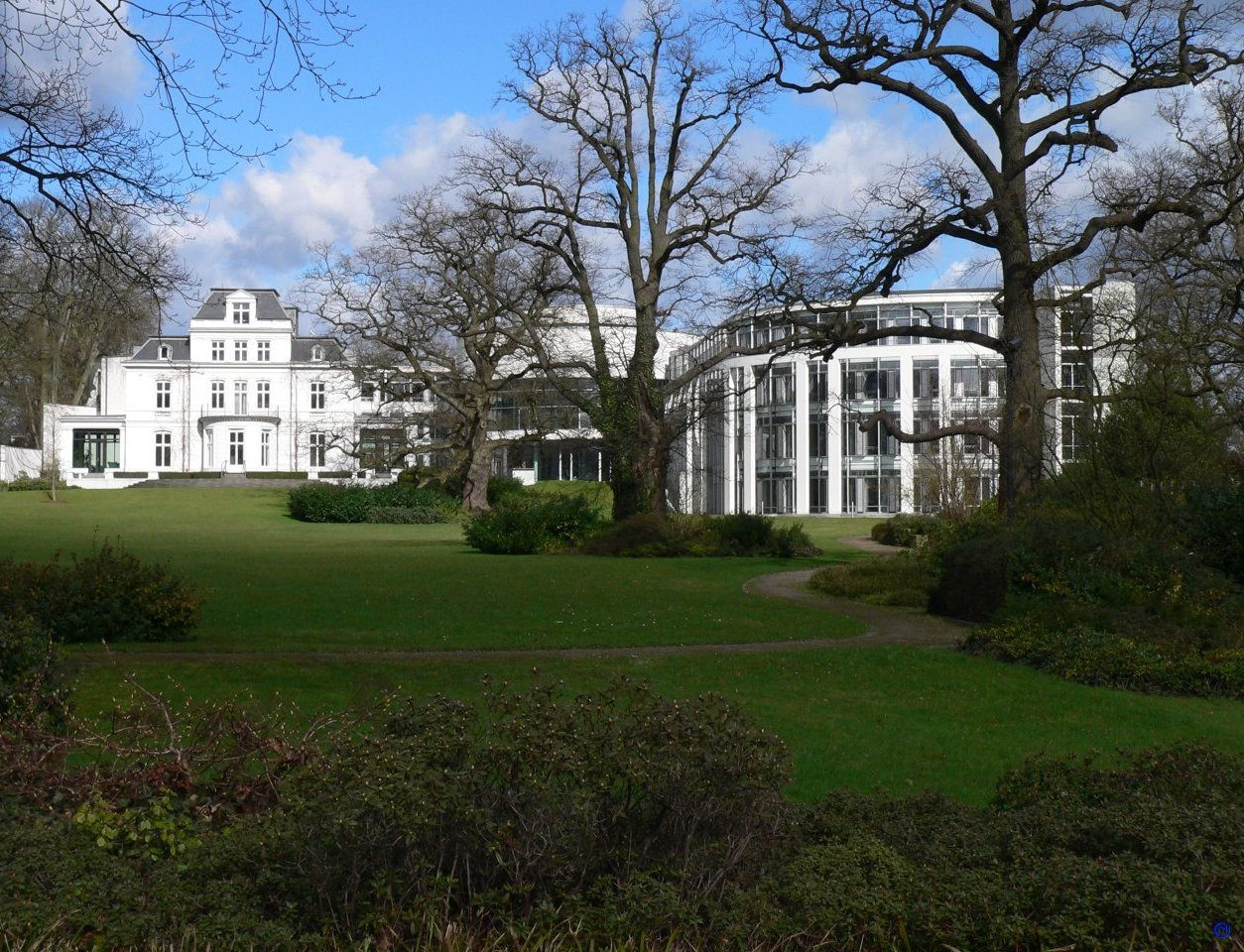
ITLOS seen from Elbchaussee, close to the River Elbe

The International Tribunal for the Law of the Sea (ITLOS) is an intergovernmental organization created by the mandate of the Third United Nations Conference on the Law of the Sea. It was established by the United Nations Convention on the Law of the Sea, signed at Montego Bay, Jamaica, on December 10, 1982. The Convention entered into force on November 16, 1994, and established an international framework for law over all ocean space, its uses and resources. The ITLOS is one of four dispute resolution mechanisms listed in Article 287 of the UNCLOS. Although the Tribunal was established by a United Nations convention, it is not, as such, a United Nations agency. Even so, it maintains close links with the United Nations and in 1997 the Tribunal concluded an Agreement on Cooperation and Relationship between the United Nations and the International Tribunal for the Law of the Sea, which establishes a mechanism for cooperation between the two institutions.

The Tribunal is based in Hamburg, Germany. The Convention also established the International Seabed Authority, with responsibility for the regulation of seabed mining beyond the limits of national jurisdiction, that is beyond the limits of the territorial sea, the contiguous zone and the continental shelf. As of July 2024, there are currently 157 signatories, 169 participant states plus the European Union. As of December 2022, holdouts included the United States and Iran.

== Composition ==
According to its founding statute, the Tribunal has a set of 21 judges who serve from a variety of states parties, "according to a method that intends to assure an equitable geographical representation".

At the request of Chile and the European Union, the Tribunal set up a special chamber composed of five judges to deal with the Case concerning the Conservation and Sustainable Exploitation of Swordfish Stocks in the South-Eastern Pacific Ocean (Chile/European Community).

By agreement of the parties Ghana and Ivory Coast, the Tribunal formed a special chamber composed of five judges to deal with the Dispute concerning Delimitation of the Maritime Boundary between Ghana and Côte d'Ivoire in the Atlantic Ocean (Ghana/Côte d'Ivoire).

By agreement of the parties Mauritius and Maldives, the Tribunal formed a special chamber of seven permanent judges and two ad hoc judges to deal with the Dispute concerning Delimitation of the Maritime Boundary between Mauritius and Maldives in the Indian Ocean (Mauritius/Maldives).

== Seats ==
Disputes referred to the International Tribunal for the Law of the Sea or one of its chambers can be heard in Germany or in Singapore. So far, no case has been heard outside Germany.

== Current judges ==
Judges of the International Tribunal for the Law of the Sea
Country	Name	Inauguration	President	Vice president
Malta	David Attard	2011		2017–2020
Ukraine	Markiyan Kulyk	2011		
Iceland	Tomas Heiðar	2014	2023–2026	
Russia	Roman Kolodkin	2017		
Netherlands	Liesbeth Lijnzaad	2017		
Chile	María Teresa Infante Caffi	2020		
China	Duan Jielong	2020		
Jamaica	Kathy-Ann Brown	2020		
Italy	Ida Caracciolo	2020		
Cameroon	Maurice Kamga	2020	2026–present	
Argentina	Frida Maria Armas Pfirter	2023		2026–present
Japan	Hidehisa Horinouchi	2023		
South Africa	Thembile Elphus Joyini	2023		
South Korea	Zha Hyoung Rhee	2023		
Sierra Leone	Osman Keh Kamara	2023		
Poland	Konrad Jan Marciniak	2023		
Tunisia	Slim Laghmani	2026		
Ghana	Sylvia Ama Adusu	2026		
India	Bimal N. Patel	2026		
Vietnam	Lan-Anh Thi Nguyen	2026		
Brazil	George Rodrigo Bandeira Galindo	2026		

== Former judges ==
Former judges of the International Tribunal for the Law of the Sea
Country	Name	Inauguration	Until	President	Vice president
Lebanon	Joseph Akl	1996	2017		2005–2008
United Kingdom	David Heywood Anderson	1996	2005		
Trinidad and Tobago	Lennox Fitzroy Ballah	2002	2003		
Algeria	Boualem Bouguetaia	2008	2026		2014–2017
Brazil	Antonio Cachapuz de Medeiros	2016	2016		
Paraguay	Óscar Cabello Sarubbi	2017	2026		
Argentina	Hugo Caminos	1996	2011		
India	Neeru Chadha	2017	2026		
France	Jean-Pierre Cot	2002	2020		
Iceland	Guðmundur Eiríksson	1996	2002		
Cameroon	Paul Engo	1996	2008		
China	Gao Zhiguo	2008	2020		
Mexico	Alonso Gómez-Robledo Verduzco	2014	2023		
Russia	Vladimir Golitsyn	2008	2017	2014–2017	
South Africa	Albert Hoffmann	2005	2023	2020–2023	2011–2014
(Cape Verde) Cabo Verde	José Luís Jesus	1999	2026	2008–2011	
(Grenada) Tanzania	James Kateka	2005	2023		
Argentina	Elsa Kelly	2011	2020		
Thailand	Kriangsak Kittichaisaree	2017	2026		
Russia	Anatoly Kolodkin	1996	2008		
Belize	Edward Arthur Laing	1996	2001		
Trinidad and Tobago	Anthony Lucky	2003	2020		
Brazil	Vicente Marotta Rangel	1996	2015		
Tunisia	Mohamed Mouldi Marsit	1996	2005		
Ghana	Thomas Mensah	1996	2005	1996–1999	
Senegal	Tafsir Malick Ndiaye	1996	2020		
Grenada	Dolliver Nelson	1996	2014	2002–2005	1999–2002
South Korea	Paik Jin-hyun	2009	2023	2017–2020	
South Korea	Choon-ho Park	1996	2008		
Poland	Stanisław Pawlak	2005	2023		
Italy	Tullio Treves	1996	2011		
Austria	Helmut Türk	2005	2014		2008–2011
Croatia	Budislav Vukas	1996	2005		2002–2005
Tanzania	Joseph Warioba	1996	2008		
Germany	Rüdiger Wolfrum	1996	2017	2005–2008	1996–1999
China	Xu Guangjian	2001	2007		
Japan	Soji Yamamoto	1996	2005		
Japan	Shunji Yanai	2005	2023	2011–2014	
Bulgaria	Alexander Yankov	1996	2011		
China	Zhao Lihai	1996	2000		

== Cases ==
Cases of the International Tribunal for the Law of the Sea
Case Number	Name	Applicant	Respondent	Case began	Case ended	Disposition
1	The M/V "Saiga" Case	Saint Vincent and the Grenadines	Guinea	13 November 1997	4 December 1997	Judgment on prompt release
2	The M/V "Saiga" (No. 2) Case	Saint Vincent and the Grenadines	Guinea	13 January 1998	1 July 1999	Judgment on merits
3 & 4	Southern Bluefin Tuna Cases	New Zealand	Japan	30 July 1999	27 August 1999	Order on provisional measures
3 & 4	Southern Bluefin Tuna Cases	Australia	Japan	30 July 1999	27 August 1999	Order on provisional measures
5	The "Camouco" Case	Panama	France	17 January 2000	7 February 2000	Judgment on prompt release
6	The "Monte Confurco" Case	Seychelles	France	27 November 2000	18 December 2000	Judgment on prompt release
7	Case concerning the Conservation and Sustainable Exploitation of Swordfish Stocks in the South-Eastern Pacific Ocean	Chile / European Union (Note: The European Union replaced and succeeded the European Community as a party to the case on 1 December 2009.)		19 December 2000	16 December 2009	Terminated at request of parties
8	The "Grand Prince" Case	Belize	France	21 March 2001	20 April 2001	Judgment on prompt release
9	The "Chaisiri Reefer 2" Case	Panama	Yemen	3 July 2001	13 July 2001	Terminated at request of parties
10	The MOX Plant Case	Ireland	United Kingdom	9 November 2001	3 December 2001	Order on provisional measures
11	The "Volga" Case	Russia	Australia	2 December 2002	23 December 2002	Judgment on prompt release
12	Case concerning Land Reclamation by Singapore in and Around the Straits of Johor	Malaysia	Singapore	5 September 2003	8 October 2003	Order on provisional measures
13	The "Juno Trader" Case	Saint Vincent and the Grenadines	Guinea-Bissau	18 November 2004	18 December 2004	Judgment on prompt release
14	The "Hoshinmaru" Case	Japan	Russia	6 July 2007	6 August 2007	Judgment on prompt release
15	The "Tomimaru" Case	Japan	Russia	6 July 2007	6 August 2007	Judgment on prompt release
16	Dispute concerning Delimitation of the Maritime Boundary between Bangladesh and Myanmar in the Bay of Bengal	Bangladesh / Myanmar		14 December 2009	14 March 2012	Judgment on merits
17	Responsibilities and Obligations of States Sponsoring Persons and Entities with Respect to Activities in the Area	International Seabed Authority		14 May 2010	1 February 2011	Advisory opinion
18	The M/V "Louisa" Case	Saint Vincent and the Grenadines	Spain	24 November 2010	28 May 2013	Judgment on merits
19	The M/V "Virginia G" Case	Panama / Guinea-Bissau		4 July 2011	14 April 2014	Judgment on merits
20	The "ARA Libertad" Case	Argentina	Ghana	14 November 2012	15 December 2012	Order on provisional measures
21	Request for an Advisory Opinion submitted by the Sub-Regional Fisheries Commission (SRFC)	Sub-Regional Fisheries Commission		28 March 2013	2 April 2015	Advisory opinion
22	The "Arctic Sunrise" Case	Netherlands	Russia	21 October 2013	22 November 2013	Order on provisional measures
23	Dispute concerning Delimitation of the Maritime Boundary between Ghana and Côte d'Ivoire in the Atlantic Ocean	Ghana / Ivory Coast		3 December 2014	23 September 2017	Judgment on merits
24	The "Enrica Lexie" Incident	Italy	India	21 July 2015	24 August 2015	Order on provisional measures
25	The M/V "Norstar" Case	Panama	Italy	17 December 2015	10 April 2019	Judgment on merits
26	Case concerning the Detention of Three Ukrainian Naval Vessels	Ukraine	Russia	16 April 2019	25 May 2019	Order on provisional measures
27	The M/T "San Padre Pio" Case	Switzerland	Nigeria	21 May 2019	6 July 2019	Order on provisional measures
28	Dispute concerning Delimitation of the Maritime Boundary between Mauritius and Maldives in the Indian Ocean	Mauritius / Maldives		24 September 2019	28 April 2023	Judgment on merits
29	The M/T "San Padre Pio" (No. 2) Case	Switzerland / Nigeria		17 December 2019	29 December 2021	Terminated at request of parties
30	The M/T "Heroic Idun" Case	Marshall Islands	Equatorial Guinea	10 November 2022	15 November 2022	Terminated at request of applicant
31	Request for an Advisory Opinion submitted by the Commission of Small Island States on Climate Change and International Law	Commission of Small Island States on Climate Change and International Law		12 December 2022	21 May 2024	Advisory Opinion
32	The M/T "Heroic Idun" (No. 2) Case	Marshall Islands / Equatorial Guinea		27 April 2023	27 May 2026	Judgement on merits
33	The “Zheng He” Case	Luxembourg	Mexico	3 June 2024	16 March 2026	Terminated at request of parties
34	Case concerning an inquiry by the International Seabed Authority (Nauru Ocean Resources Inc. v. International Seabed Authority)	Nauru Ocean Resources Inc.	International Seabed Authority	30 May 2026	Ongoing	
35	Case concerning an inquiry by the International Seabed Authority (Tonga Offshore Mining Ltd. v. International Seabed Authority)	Tonga Offshore Mining Ltd.	International Seabed Authority	30 May 2026	Ongoing	
36	Dispute concerning delimitation of the maritime boundary between Ghana and Togo in the Gulf of Guinea (Ghana/Togo)	Ghana / Togo		12 June 2026	Ongoing	
37	Case concerning hydrocarbon exploitation in the South-West Atlantic Ocean (Argentina v. United Kingdom)	Argentina	United Kingdom	13 October 2026	Ongoing	
