= Supreme Court of Judicature (Trinidad and Tobago) =

Supreme Court of Trinidad and Tobago

The Supreme Court of Judicature for Trinidad and Tobago is the superior court for Trinidad and Tobago. It was established in accordance with the Constitution of Trinidad and Tobago and the Supreme Court of Judicature Act, 1962.

== Composition ==
The Supreme Court of Judicature consists of a High Court of Justice and a Court of Appeal. The High Court is made up of the Chief Justice and between six and thirty-six puisine judges, and the Court of Appeal is made of up the Chief Justice and twelve Justices of Appeal. The judges have seniority according to their date of appointment and Justices of Appeal have precedence over High Court Justices.

A judge cannot be appointed to the High Court unless they have been a member of the Bar of England and Wales or an attorney-at-law under the Legal Profession Act, 1986 for ten years. A judge cannot be appointed to the Court of Appeal unless he has been a judge of the former Supreme Court or High Court for three years, or has been a member of the Bar of England and Wales or an attorney-at-law for fifteen years.

The Chief Justice is appointed by the President, with advice from the Prime Minister and Leader of the Opposition. Other judges are appointed by the President, in consultation with the Judicial and Legal Service Commission.

== Jurisdiction ==
The High Court has original jurisdiction over indictable criminal matters, family matters, and civil matters. It sits at Port of Spain, San Fernando and Scarborough. A decision of the High Court can be appealed to the Court of Appeal whether there is a question of constitutional interpretation, a breach of the laws protecting fundamental rights, a decision allowing or refusing proceedings which relate to the appointment, qualification, election or membership of a Senator or member of the House of Representatives, or a punishment for contempt of court.

Appeals can be filed from the Supreme Court to the Caribbean Court of Justice, with final appeal to the Judicial Committee of the Privy Council in London.

== Judges ==
The following are the judges of the Court of Appeal as of June 2021:

- Mr. Justice Ivor Archie (Chief Justice)
- Mr Justice James Aboud
- Mr. Justice Nolan Bereaux
- Mr. Justice Ronnie Boodoosingh
- Mme. Justice Mira Dean-Armorer
- Mr. Justice Malcolm Holdip
- Mr. Justice Vasheist Kokaram
- Mme. Justice Gillian Lucky
- Mr. Justice Allan Mendonça
- Mr. Justice Mark Mohammed
- Mr. Justice Prakash Moosai
- Mme. Justice Charmaine Pemberton
- Mr. Justice Peter Rajkumar
- Mr. Justice Gregory Smith
- Mme. Justice Maria Wilson
- Mme. Alice Yorke-Soo Hon
