= Sea Lots =

Coordinates: 10.644°N 61.505°W

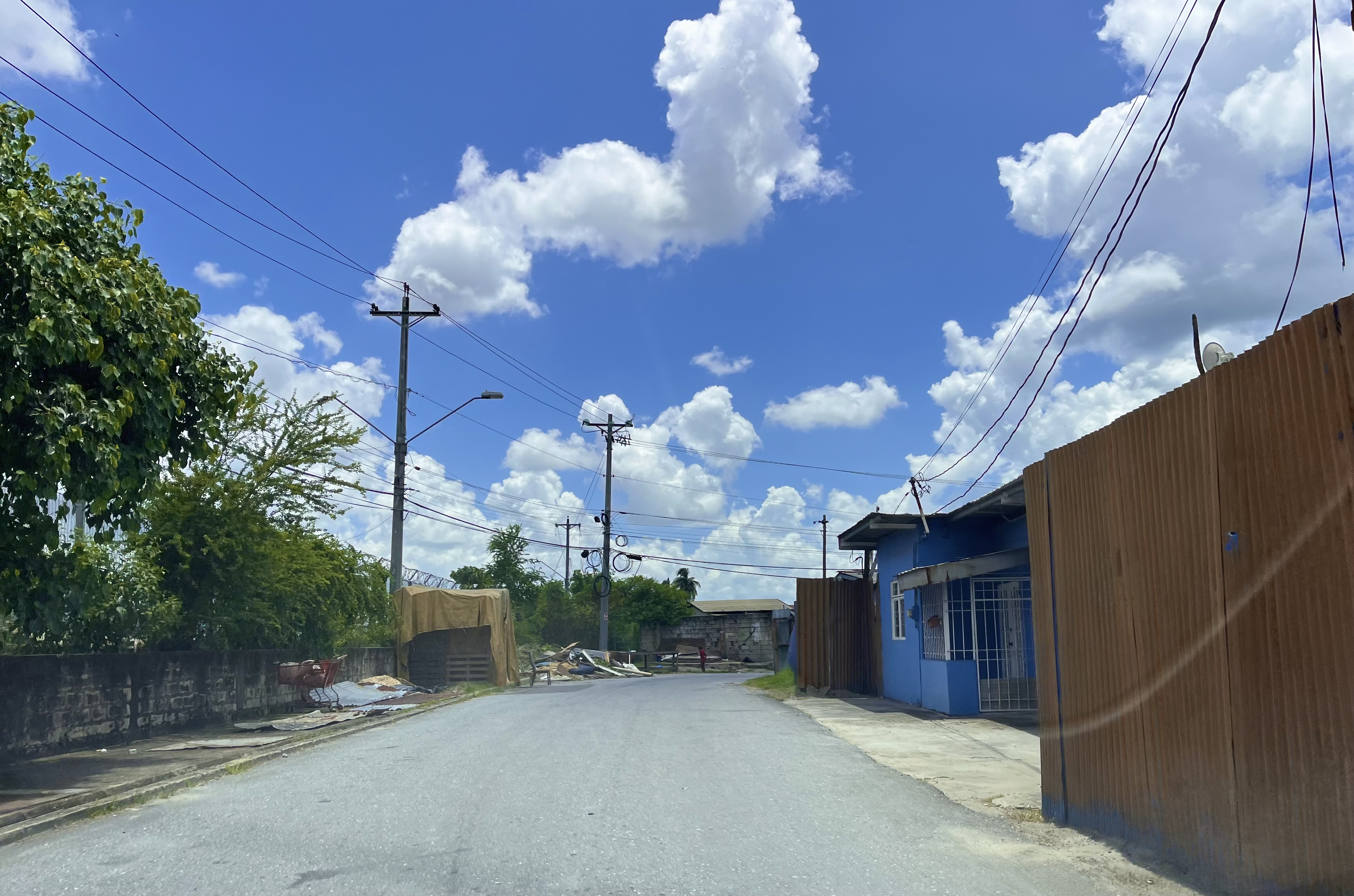
Sea Lots, September 2024

Sea Lots is an area within Trinidad and Tobago. The area received its name because the government at the time parceled "lots" of land near the sea. This area is considered part of a group of localities that together are known as Laventille. Sea Lots, however, though very close to Laventille, is distinct from it.

Its close proximity to the sea also makes it very close to the port in Port of Spain, and many old and defunct vessels can be seen in the area. There are also various industrial facilities operating locally, so despite the large number of residents (mostly squatters) it is more of an industrial than a residential area. It is also known as a crime ridden community

In 2013, Machel Montano and Morgan Heritage collaborated on the song, "I See Lots", in an attempt to bring attention to the poverty and crime in the area, while showcasing the youth of the Sea Lots, who desperately need financial assistance and higher education.
