= Bay of Bengal Maritime Boundary Arbitration =

2009–2014 international arbitration case

- Court: Permanent Court of Arbitration
- Full case name: Bay of Bengal Maritime Boundary Arbitration (Bangladesh v. India)
- Decided: July 7, 2014
- Citation: PCA Case No. 2010-16
- Transcript: pca-cpa.org/en/cases/18/

Court membership
- Chief judge: Rudiger Wolfrum
- Associate judges: Ivan Shearer; Jean-Pierre Cot; Thomas Mensah; Pemmaraju Sreenivasa Rao

The Bay of Bengal Maritime Boundary Arbitration (Bangladesh v. India) was an arbitral case brought by the People's Republic of Bangladesh against the Republic of India, in which the tribunal resolved the maritime border dispute between the two countries. The dispute was arbitrated before an arbitral tribunal constituted under Annex VII of the United Nations Convention on the Law of the Sea (UNCLOS), in which the Permanent Court of Arbitration served as the registry. It awarded 19,467 square kilometers of the disputed territory to Bangladesh and the rest to India, out of a total of 25,602 square kilometers.

== Background ==
The dispute began with the 1947 partition of India, which established the border between India and Bangladesh (then East Pakistan). Negotiations regarding the maritime boundaries in the Bay of Bengal between Bangladesh and its neighboring coastal states began in the 1970s. Interest in oil and gas reserves in the Bay of Bengal intensified tension, highlighted in 2006 when India bid on ocean territory also claimed by Bangladesh. Tensions escalated in 2008 when Myanmar navy and Daewoo survey ships entered disputed waters, prompting Bangladesh to send naval vessels. In the same year, Bangladesh responded to an Indian survey ship, reportedly with naval escort, also entering the area. After bilateral negotiations failed to reach a resolution, Bangladesh initiated arbitral proceedings against India on October 8, 2009, under UNCLOS Annex VII.

== Arbitration process ==
Bangladesh submitted its statement of claim to the court in May 2011. India responded with its counter-memorial by July 2012. Bangladesh filed its rejoinder on January 31, 2013, and India submitted its reply by July 31, 2013. The Arbitration Court held oral hearings for both parties from December 9 to December 18, 2013.

=== Court membership ===
The Permanent Court of Arbitration was composed of three arbitrators: Tullio Treves from Italy, Ivan Shearer from Australia, Rudigar Wolfrum from Germany, and one arbitrator each nominated by Bangladesh and India. Bangladesh nominated former Judge Thomas Mensah from Ghana, while India nominated Pemmaraju Sreenivasa Rao, a former Legal Adviser of the Ministry of External Affairs. The Court was presided over by Rudigar Wolfrum. In July 2013, Tullio Treves resigned, and in consultation with both parties, French jurist Jean-Pierre Cot was appointed to replace him.

On behalf of India, the legal team included RKP Shankardass, Alain Pellet, Michael Reisman, and Michael Wood. For Bangladesh, the lawyers were Lawrence Martin, Philippe Sands, Payam Akhavan, Paul Reichler, Alan Boyle, and James Crawford.

=== Award ===
On July 7, 2014, the Tribunal announced its decision. It rejected the angle-bisector method and instead adopted the standard three-stage delimitation methodology, which includes a provisional equidistance line, adjustments for relevant circumstances, and a disproportionality test. The Tribunal acknowledged that the concave geography of the Bay of Bengal was a relevant circumstance that caused a cut-off effect. As a result, it adjusted the equidistance line, awarding Bangladesh approximately 19,467 square kilometers out of the 25,602 square kilometers of disputed territory in the Bay of Bengal.

The delimitation created a legal grey area located beyond 200 nautical miles from Bangladesh's coast but within 200 nautical miles of India's coast. In this region, Bangladesh holds sovereign rights over the seabed and subsoil, while India retains sovereign rights over the superjacent water column.

== See also ==
- Bangladesh–India relations
- Barbados v. Trinidad and Tobago
- Chagos Marine Protected Area Arbitration (Mauritius v. United Kingdom)
- South China Sea Arbitration
