= Barbados–Trinidad and Tobago relations =

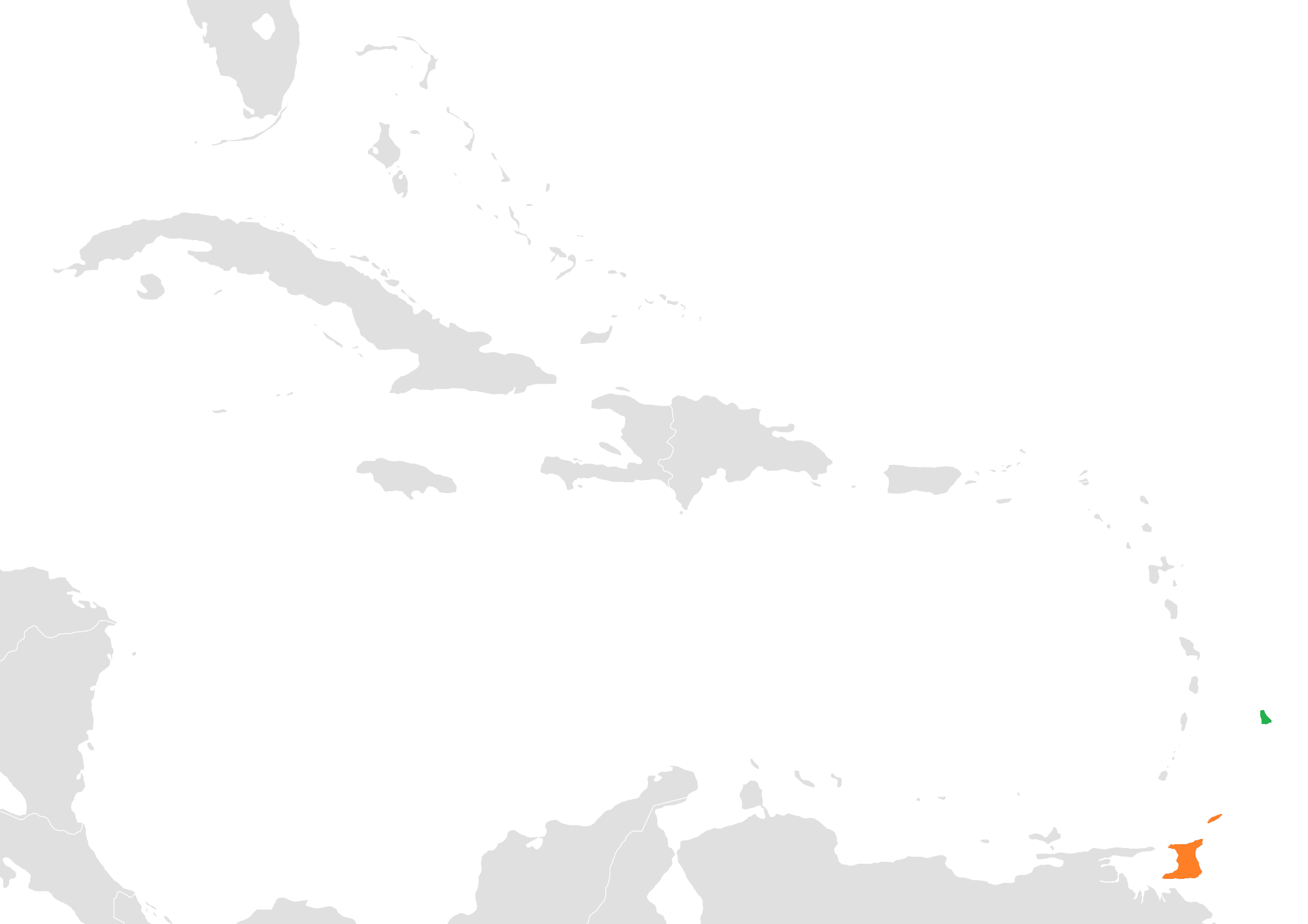

- Barbados: Trinidad and Tobago

Barbados and Trinidad and Tobago formally established diplomatic relations on Barbados' national date of independence, 30 November 1966. Barbados maintains non-resident representation to Port of Spain, and the Republic of Trinidad and Tobago maintains non-resident representation to Bridgetown. Both countries are members of many shared organisations, including the Association of Caribbean States, the Commonwealth of Nations, CARICOM, CARIFORUM, and the Community of Latin American and Caribbean States.

== History ==
Early bilateral interactions occurred as both countries shared their colonial relationship as former parts of the British Empire. One of the first moves towards a more formal relationship between Barbados and Tobago began with an attempted move by Barbados to secure a British agreement for unification of Barbados and Tobago. The move however failed and Tobago continued on a path of administrative unification with Trinidad in 1889. Prior to this unification both Barbados and Tobago were parts of a British experiment of placing several neighbouring British possessions in the Windward Islands under the administration of the Governor of Barbados. This formed the basis of the colony of Barbados and the British Windward Islands. Barbados was involved in this colony from 1833 until 1885, while Tobago though was involved from 1833 until 1889. Upon the withdrawal of Barbados, the island lobbied the British government to amalgamate Tobago with Barbados but was unsuccessful and Tobago became a part of Trinidad instead.

While Barbados was the only island in the West Indies which never witnessed a change in colonial power since the founding settlement there in 1627, both Trinidad and Tobago witnessed a rocky beginning after being sought after in rotation by several colonial powers.

Relations between Barbados and Trinidad have also been historical important with large instances of Barbadians emigrating to Trinidad and Trinidadians immigrating to Barbados. A Trinidadian the Right Excellent Clement Osbourne Payne was made a national hero of Barbados by the Barbadian government for his contribution to the trade union movement in Barbados. Female Barbadian Gospel singer Sherryann Maughn was also born in Trinidad and Tobago and she came to Barbados at eleven (11) years old she's the first Trinidadian-Barbadian singer to come to Barbados and the second female Barbadian singer to arrive in Barbados at eleven (11) years old

Migration between both nations has traditionally been robust. In 1891 Trinidad's census showed a migration from Barbados of 13,890 Barbadians, while in 1946, figures showed over 12,350 persons in Trinidad & Tobago were born in Barbados.

=== Modern relations ===
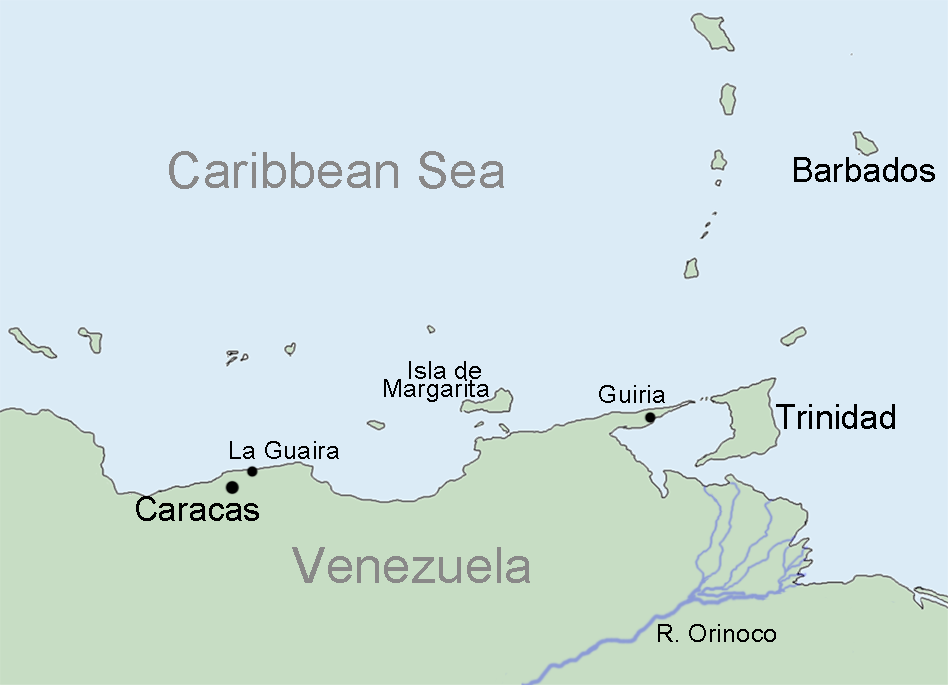
The coast of Venezuela (South America), Trinidad and Tobago and Barbados

Relations between Barbados, Trinidad and Tobago have mainly been cordial and cooperative, with an edge of wariness on both sides, due to a contentious decade long maritime boundary dispute. Outside of this, there have been little historical differences between the neighbouring countries. Both nations tend to support one another in International fora such as in the establishment of the International Criminal Court (ICCt), financial support for other less developed members of the Caribbean Community (CARICOM), policy support for the Organisation of Eastern Caribbean States (OECS), and in other areas. There have been more recent disagreements between two of the leaders of the two countries; Barbadian Prime Minister Owen Arthur and his Trinidadian counterpart Prime Minister Patrick Manning. The maritime boundary dispute was resolved in 2006 through binding arbitration at the Permanent Court of Arbitration.

In 2005, former Prime Minister of Barbados, the Rt. Hon. Owen Arthur quipped to the Barbados media that the Government of Barbados might contemplate political union of Tobago with Barbados as a single state. Orville London as Chief Secretary of the THA stated that they would "choose Trinidad every-time", thereby dampening the idea of any future discussions.

In 2014, Barbados' Ambassador to CARICOM, Robert Morris was accredited as the Barbados' official High Commissioner to the Republic of Trinidad and Tobago.

== Economic relations ==
Trinidadian companies are major financial stakeholders in a number of Barbadian businesses. This has brought about a tremulous outcry from the Barbadian public on an occasion. The outcry will usually go away after a short period of time. The problems were first brought to the fore by a 1999 Soca/Calypso hit-song by Mac Fingall titled "Barbados belong to Trinidad", the song which became a catch phrase, and served to emphasise a number of issues between the two countries sought to satirise the inter-relations but had a negative effect instead. Tensions continued to escalate in Barbados following the popularity of that song and a subsequent hostile take-over bid for the Life of Barbados Ltd. (LOB) insurance company by Trinidad-based Guardian Holdings Ltd. (GHL) Things started to take a turn for the worse once several Barbadian fishermen were arrested in the water between the two countries.

Barbados and the Government of Trinidad and Tobago signed an agreement to construct an undersea 177 mile oil or Liquid Natural Gas (LNG) pipeline which will stretch from Tobago to Barbados. The project is to be undertaken by the Eastern Caribbean Gas Pipeline Company Limited. It will see energy delivered directly from Trinidad and Tobago to the domestic Barbadian natural gas network and feeding into the power plants in Barbados.

== Sports ==
Both countries are part of the multi-national West Indies cricket team, with several players from both countries representing the board.
