= Margareta Kassangana =

Polish politician

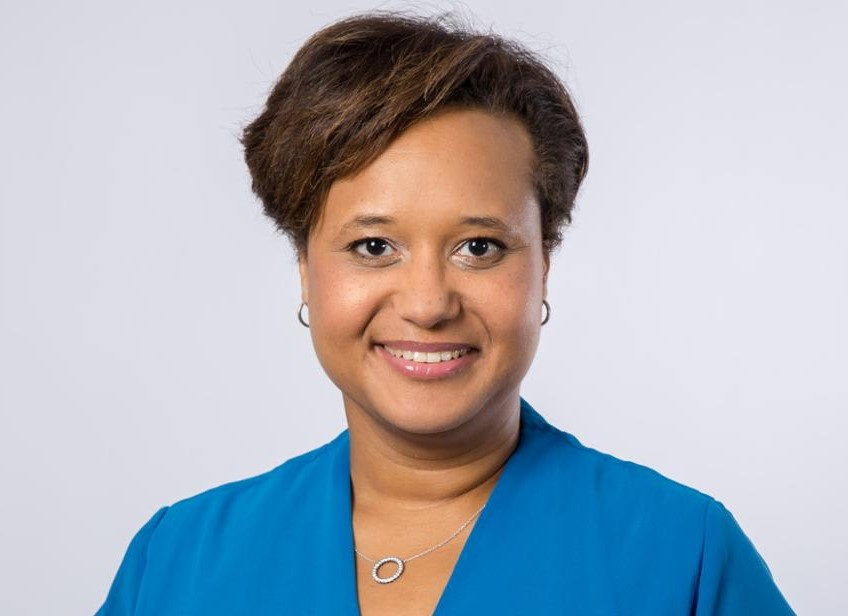

Poland Ambassador to the Netherlands
- Incumbent
- Assumed office 16 January 2023
- Preceded by: Marcin Czepelak

Vice-President of the Assembly of States Parties of the International Criminal Court
- Incumbent
- Assumed office 2023
- Appointed by: Assembly of States Parties
- Preceded by: Kateřina Sequensová

Poland Ambassador to Senegal
- In office November 2017 – November 2022
- Preceded by: Andrzej Łupina
- Succeeded by: Bartłomiej Zdaniuk

Personal details
- Born: 1975 (age 50–51) Warsaw, Poland
- Education: University of Warsaw
- Profession: Civil servant, diplomat

Margareta Kassangana (born 1975 in Warsaw) is a Polish civil servant and diplomat; since 2023 she is serving as an ambassador to the Netherlands. Between 2017 and 2022 she was ambassador to Senegal.

== Education ==
Margareta Kassangana in 1999 earned her Master of Arts degree in international relations from the University of Warsaw. She has been also studying European integration at the Maastricht University (2001).

Apart from Polish, she speaks English and French languages.

== Career ==
Following her work for the Ministry Labour and Social Policy where she was responsible for the cooperation with International Labour Organization, Margareta Kassangana in 2001 joined the diplomatic service. Between 2004 and 2007 she was Second and First Secretary at the Permanent Mission of Poland to the United Nations Office at Geneva. From 2007 to 2011 she work, firstly, at the European Commission External relations Directorate General and, secondly, for the newly created European External Action Service where she was in charge of relations with the UN on women’s and children’s rights, social development, education, labour, culture. In 2011 she returned to the MFA in Warsaw as head of the unit at the Department of Public and Cultural Diplomacy. In November 2013 she became the Department of Africa and the Middle East deputy director for Sub-Saharan Africa, Israel and Palestine. Since August 2015 she was the deputy head of the Permanent Mission of Poland to the United Nations in New York.

In November 2017 she was nominated as Poland ambassador to Senegal, first after a 9-year break. She presented her credentials to the president Macky Sall on 23 February 2018. She was also accredited to seven other countries: Burkina Faso, the Gambia, Guinea, Guinea-Bissau, Mali, Ivory Coast and Cape Verde. She ended her term on 12 November 2022. On 6 December 2022 she was nominated Poland ambassador to the Netherlands. She began her term on 16 January 2023.

== Honours ==
- Gold Medal of Merit for National Defence (Poland, 2022)
- Commander of the National Order of the Lion (Senegal)
