= Radio Corporation of America v China =

1935 arbitral proceeding

Radio Corporation of America v. Republic of China
- Registered with the Permanent Court of Arbitration
- Court: An arbitral tribunal constituted pursuant to paragraph 10 of the Traffic Agreement of November 10th, 1928, between the Radio Corporation of America and the Republic of China
- Full case name: Arbitration case between Radio Corporation of America versus the National Government of the Republic of China
- Decided: 13 April 1935
- Citation: III RIAA 1621

Court membership
- Judges sitting: J. A. van Hamel (Chairman); Auguste Hubert (Arbitrator appointed by plaintiff); Dr. Reinhold Furrer (Arbitrator appointed by defendant

Radio Corporation of America v China was a 1935 arbitration case under the auspices of the Permanent Court of Arbitration, determining whether a 1928 concession granted by the government of China (specifically the Chinese National Council of Reconstruction) to the Radio Corporation of America (RCA), for operation of communication by a radio link between the United States and China, was exclusive, and could be considered to prohibit a similar concession granted in 1932 to the Mackay Radio and Telegraph Company. The arbitration ruling concluded that the additional concession was valid, because the RCA concession could not be considered exclusive.

== Background ==
RCA was founded in 1919. At the time all radio and telegraphic traffic between China and the US, including official messages, were sent through either German radio or British cable links. Therefore, the US Navy lobbied a reluctant RCA to seek a concession for radio link to China (even though RCA's other Asian concessions were operating at a loss). RCA agreed, and in 1928 received a concession from China which began operation that year.

The Mackay Radio and Telegraph Company of California, also an American interest, signed a similar agreement with China in 1932. RCA claimed this was a breach of contract, on the grounds that its 1928 agreement gave it the exclusive right for the link.

== Arbitration decision ==
The dispute was decided by a three-member arbitration panel under the auspices of the Permanent Court of Arbitration, based in The Hague, under the provisions of the 1907 Convention for the Pacific Settlement of International Disputes. In 1935 it issued its opinion, concluding that the language of the RCA concession could not be construed as limiting the Chinese government's ability to authorize additional concessions:

The Chinese Government can certainly sign away a part of its liberty of action, and this also in the field of international radio-telegraphic communications, and of its cooperation therein. It can do so as well in an implicit manner, if a reasonable construction of its undertakings leads up to that conclusion. It will, as any other party, be bound by law and by any obligations, legally accepted. But as a sovereign government, on principle free in its restriction of its freedom of action, unless the acceptance can be ascertained distinctly and beyond a reasonable doubt.
