= Marcin Czepelak =

Polish politician

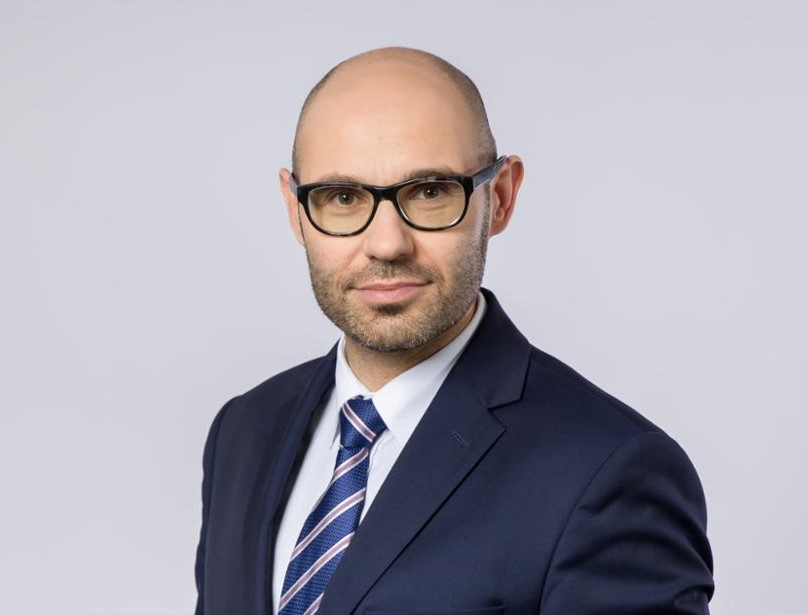

Secretary-General of the Permanent Court of Arbitration
- Incumbent
- Assumed office 1 June 2022
- Preceded by: Hugo Siblesz

Polish Ambassador to the Netherlands
- In office 13 September 2017 – 31 May 2022
- Appointed by: Andrzej Duda
- Monarch: Willem-Alexander
- Preceded by: Jan Borkowski
- Succeeded by: Margareta Kassangana

Personal details
- Born: 14 July 1978 (age 48) Gliwice
- Education: Jagiellonian University
- Profession: jurist, diplomat

Marcin Piotr Czepelak (born 14 July 1978, Gliwice) is a Polish jurist who has served as the Secretary-General of the Permanent Court of Arbitration, the Hague since 2022. Previously, he was the ambassador of Poland to the Netherlands and the Permanent Representative of Poland to the OPCW (2017–2022).

== Education ==
Marcin Czepelak graduated from Jagiellonian University with a degree in law in 2002. In 2006, he defended his Ph.D. thesis on international agreements. The dissertation won the Prime Minister’s award for the best thesis in 2008. In 2016, he was awarded a post-doctoral degree (habilitation) on the basis of his monograph, Party Autonomy in the Private International Law of the European Union.

Besides Polish, he speaks English, French, German and Spanish.

== Career ==
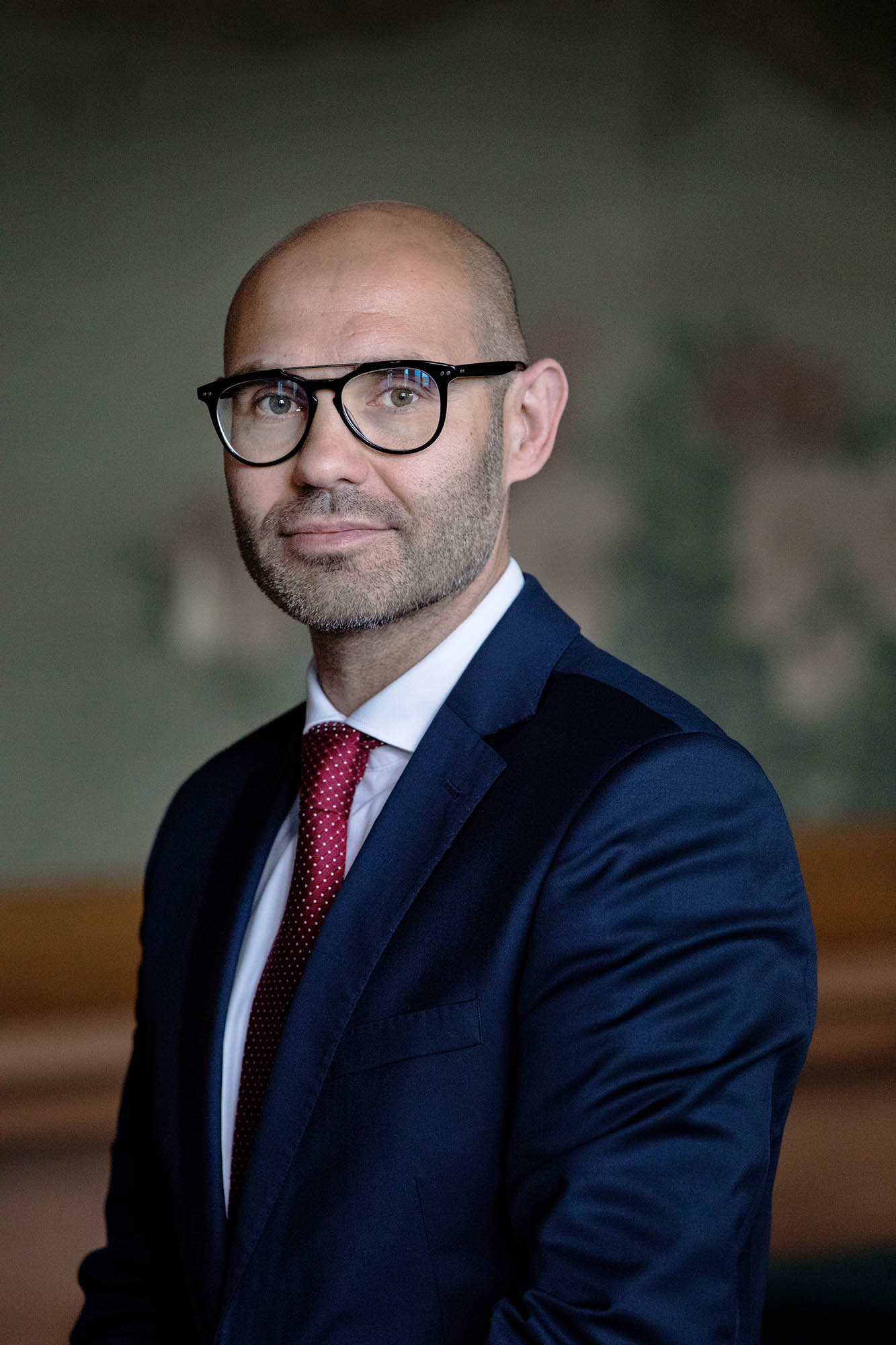
PCA Secretary-General Dr. hab. Marcin Czepelak

He worked in the Kraków Town Hall. He is an associate professor at Jagiellonian University, where he gives lectures on the law of international agreements, private international law and the international law of succession. He participated in research projects at the Max Planck Institute in Hamburg and the University of Cambridge. He completed an internship at The Hague Academy of International Law. He specializes in international civil procedure, the protection of foreign investments and the law of treaties. He publishes in Polish, English and Italian.

On 22 June 2017 he was appointed Polish Ambassador to the Netherlands. On 12 September he presented his credentials to king Willem-Alexander of the Netherlands. He has also been accredited to the Organisation for the Prohibition of Chemical Weapons. He ended his term on 31 May 2022. On 14 February 2022 he started his 5-year term as the Secretary-General of the Permanent Court of Arbitration, the Hague.

== Works ==
- Autonomia woli w prawie prywatnym międzynarodowym Unii Europejskiej (Party autonomy in the EU Private International Law), Warszawa: Poltext, 2015, ISBN 978-83-7561-518-0.
- Międzynarodowe prawo zobowiązań Unii Europejskiej. Komentarz do rozporządzeń rzymskich (International Law of Obligations of the European Union. Commentary on the Rome Regulations), Warszawa: LexisNexis, 2012, ISBN 978-83-7806-492-3.
- Umowa międzynarodowa jako źródło prawa prywatnego międzynarodowego, Warszawa: Wolters Kluwer Polska, 2008, ISBN 978-83-7526-469-2.
- Stosunki majątkowe między małżonkami w prawie prywatnym międzynarodowym, Kraków: Krakowskie Towarzystwo Edukacyjne, 2004.
