= Permanent Court of Arbitration =

Intergovernmental organization

- Cour permanente d'arbitrage
- Seal of the PCA
- Interactive map of Permanent Court of Arbitration
- 52°05′11″N 4°17′44″E
- Established: 1899
- Jurisdiction: Worldwide, 129 Contracting Parties
- Location: The Hague, Netherlands
- Coordinates: 52°05′11″N 4°17′44″E
- Authorised by: Hague Peace Conference
- Judge term length: 6 years (renewable)
- Number of positions: Maximum 4 per Contracting Party
- Website: pca-cpa.org

Secretary-General
- Currently: Marcin Czepelak
- Since: 2022

The Permanent Court of Arbitration (PCA) is an intergovernmental organization headquartered at the Peace Palace in The Hague, Netherlands, which was built to house the PCA.

Unlike a judicial court in the traditional sense, the PCA provides administrative support in international arbitrations involving various combinations of states, state entities, international organizations and private parties. The cases span a wide range of legal issues involving territorial and maritime boundaries, sovereignty, human rights, international investment, and international and regional trade. The PCA is constituted through two separate multilateral conventions with a combined membership of 129 Contracting Parties. The PCA is not a United Nations agency, but has been a United Nations observer since 1993.

The PCA was established by the Convention for the Pacific Settlement of International Disputes, which concluded at The Hague in 1899 during the first Hague Peace Conference of 1899. The Conference had been convened at the initiative of Tsar Nicholas II of Russia "with the object of seeking the most objective means of ensuring to all peoples the benefits of a real and lasting peace, and above all, of limiting the progressive development of existing armaments".

The PCA began its activities as a major forum for resolving inter-state disputes. Subsequently, the Court started handling mixed arbitrations between states and private parties since its first such case in 1934 (PCA Case No. 1934-01, Radio Corporation of America v. China). In the 21st century, the PCA has resurged as a venue for inter-state arbitrations and resolving investor-state disputes and is currently administering over 210 dispute resolution proceedings, making it the most active international court in The Hague.

In June 2026, the Court was acting as registry in 7 inter-state arbitrations, 1 other inter-state proceeding, 90 arbitrations arising under bilateral or multilateral investment treaties or national investment laws, 101 arbitrations arising under contracts involving a State or other public entity, and 11 other proceedings.

== Organization ==
Parties of the Permanent Court of Arbitration according to the convention of 1907 according to the convention of 1899 not a party

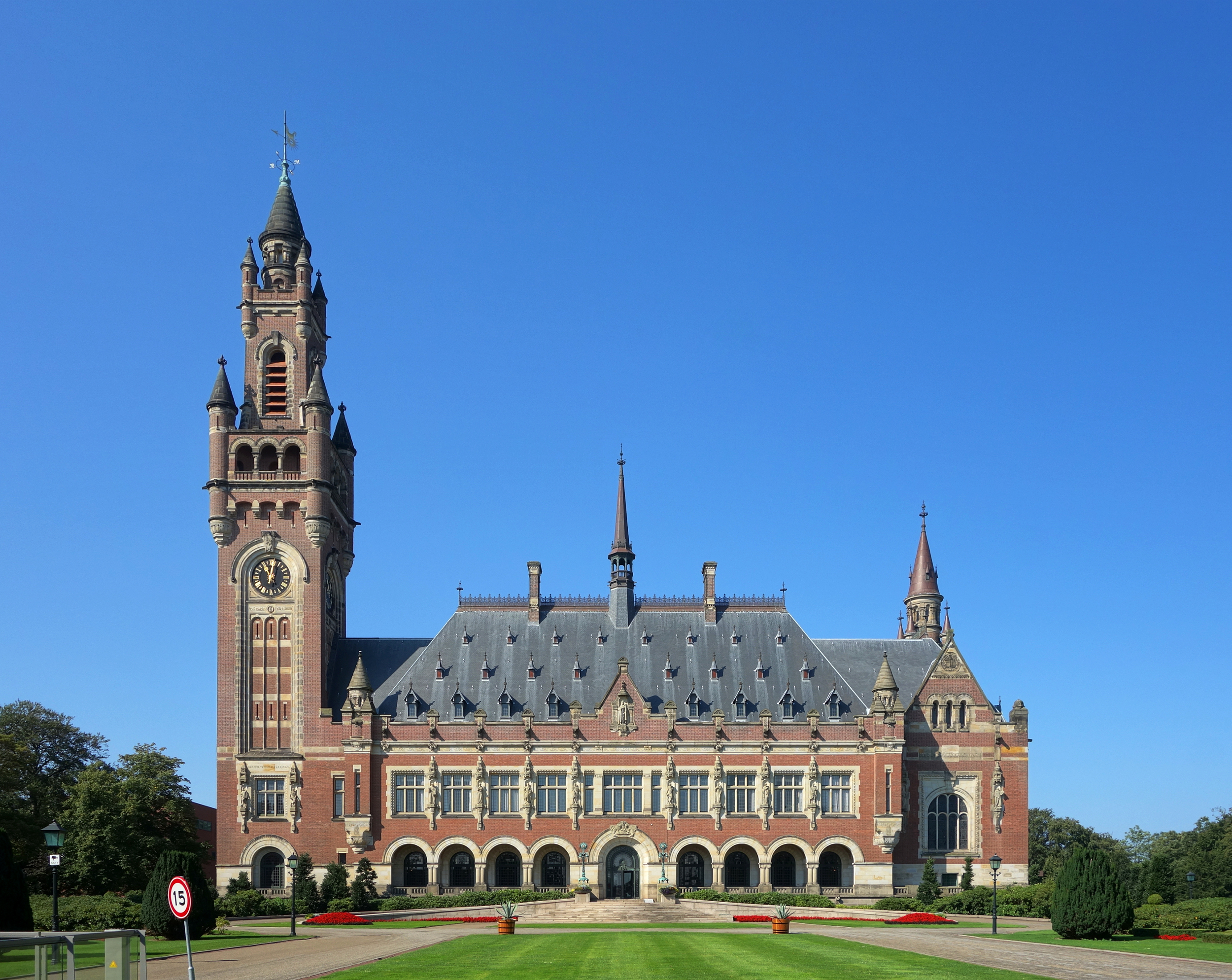
The PCA is held in the Peace Palace.

The PCA is not a conventional court, but an intergovernmental organization with the objective of having permanent and readily available means to serve as the registry for purposes of international arbitration and other related procedures, including commissions of enquiry and conciliation.

The Administrative Council (formally the Permanent Administrative Council) is a body composed of all the diplomatic representatives of the Contracting Parties accredited to the Netherlands. It is responsible for the "direction and control" of the International Bureau, directs the organisation's budget and reports on its activities.

The International Bureau is the Secretariat of the PCA and is headed by the secretary-general. It provides linguistic, research, administrative and financial support to PCA arbitration tribunals.

The third organ of the PCA are the Members of the Court. Each contracting party may appoint up to four persons "of known competency in questions of international law, of the highest moral reputation and disposed to accept the duties of arbitrators" for a renewable six-year term. In addition to forming a panel of potential arbitrators, the Members of the Court from each contracting party constitute a "national group", which is entitled to nominate candidates for the election to the International Court of Justice (ICJ). The Members of the Court (along with the judges of the ICJ) are among a handful of groups entitled to nominate candidates for the Nobel Peace Prize.

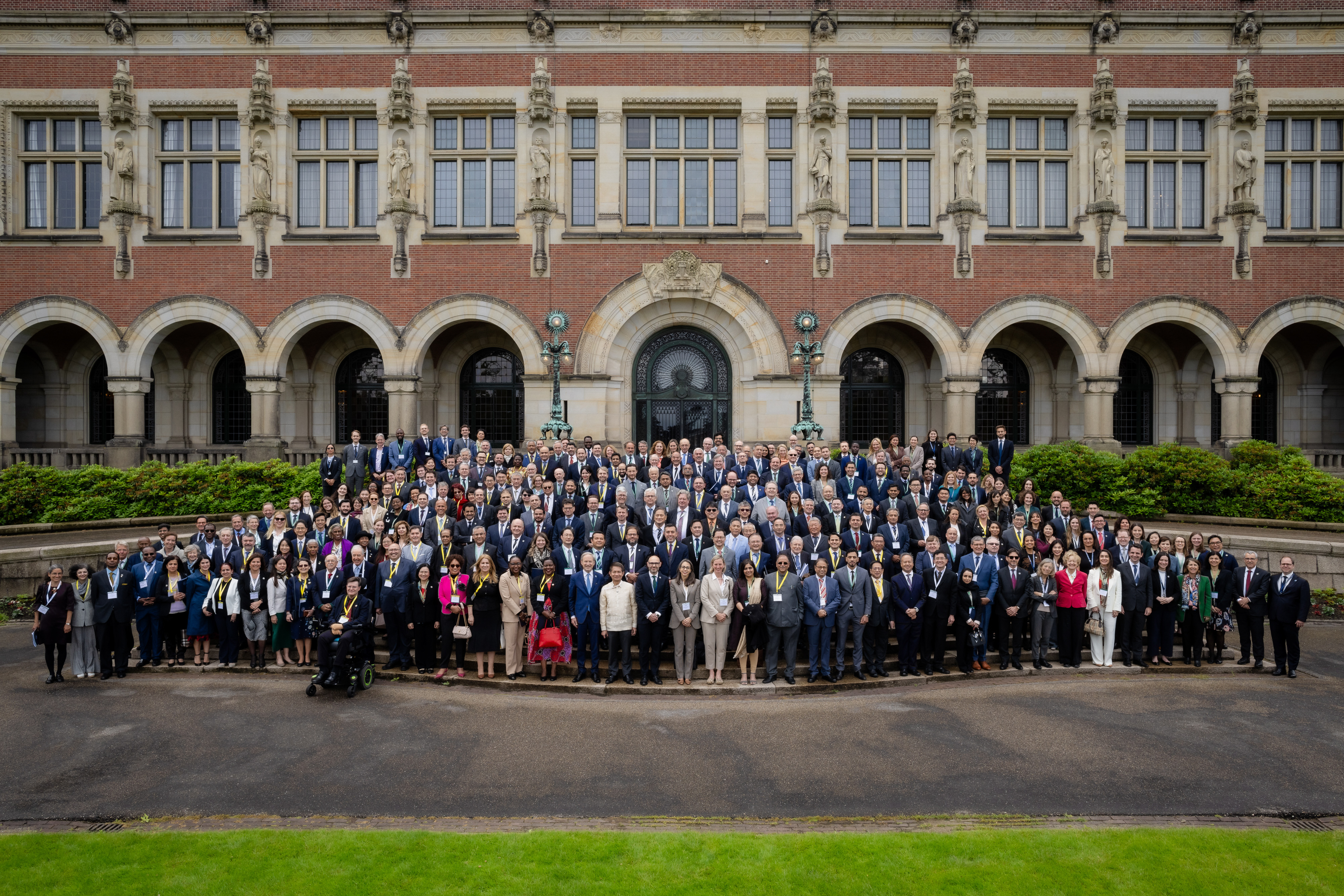
Members of the PCA in 2024

Parties to a dispute may, but are not obliged to, select arbitrators from the list of the Members of the Court.

The PCA sometimes gets confused with the ICJ, which also has its seat in the Peace Palace. The PCA is not part of the UN System, holding observer status in the UN General Assembly since 1993.

Both Courts handle inter-State cases. The ICJ does so through a defined judicial procedure, whereas the PCA administers a variety of dispute resolution services from arbitration and conciliation proceedings, to fact-finding commissions of inquiry and mass claims commissions. The PCA also handles a variety of cases that are not only between States, but involve different combinations of States, State-controlled entities, intergovernmental organizations, and private entities.

== Contracting parties ==
Parties to the Hague Conventions on the Pacific Settlement of disputes of 1899 (72 parties) and 1907 (102 parties) are automatically parties to the PCA. As 52 are parties to both conventions, the PCA has 129 contracting parties: 127 members of the United Nations, as well as Kosovo and Palestine.

During the second Hague Peace Conference of 1907, French delegate Baron d’Estournelles de Constant proposed that all participating nations contribute to the construction of the PCA's headquarters, the Peace Palace. His suggestion was warmly received, and the PCA's founding states contributed gifts and materials from around the world for the construction of its headquarters.

== Functions ==
PCA tribunals have jurisdiction for disputes based on the PCA founding documents (the Conventions on Pacific Settlement of International Disputes), or based on bilateral and multilateral treaties. While the PCA's initial activity principally concerned the settlement of disputes involving only States, through arbitration and other peaceful means such as conciliation, mediation, and fact-finding, the PCA Founding Conventions of 1899 and 1907 established a flexible framework. Over time, the PCA's Contracting Parties, in keeping with the evolving needs of the international community, have interpreted the Court's mandate to include disputes involving various combinations of States, State entities, international organizations, and private parties.

=== Appointing authority ===
The PCA secretary-general furthermore acts as an appointing authority for arbitration.

When problems arise in designating arbitrators for an arbitration under UNCITRAL arbitration rules (e.g. because one of the parties refuses to designate an arbitrator, or when the designated arbitrators are unable to agree on designation of a third arbitrator), the PCA secretary-general may be requested to serve as an appointing authority. This option is also open for other arbitration agreements, in which the secretary-general is designated. Between 2011 and 2015, 257 such requests were submitted. In 2024, the Secretary-General received 51 requests relating to appointing authority services.

=== Interstate arbitration based on the Hague Convention ===
Arbitration between two States takes place when two Contracting Parties of the PCA decide to submit a dispute for arbitration to a PCA Tribunal. The Tribunal consists of five arbitrators: two (one of whom may be a national of the party concerned) are selected by each party to the arbitration; these four arbitrators then choose the fifth and presiding arbitrator.

=== Interstate arbitration based on UNCLOS ===
The United Nations Convention on the Law of the Sea (UNCLOS) provides for a dispute resolution mechanism regarding maritime boundaries in which member states can choose one of the following:

1. International Tribunal for the Law of the Sea
2. International Court of Justice,
3. arbitral tribunal (constituted in accordance with Annex VII, UNCLOS)
4. a special arbitral tribunal (constituted in accordance with Annex VIII).

If two member states have elected different dispute resolution measures, the third option is to be used. As of 2025, the PCA has administered 14 of the 15 cases initiated by states under Annex VII to the UNCLOS.

=== Investor–state investment disputes ===
Many free trade agreements provide for a mechanism to resolve disputes between investors and states through arbitration through so-called investor–state dispute settlement (ISDS) clauses. The PCA may play a role in such proceedings as appointing authority for arbitrators, by use of its arbitration rules or by providing support to the arbitration case.

=== Conciliation ===
Conciliation has formed part of the PCA’s activities since 1937, when the Administrative Council formally incorporated conciliation within the PCA’s mandate. The PCA subsequently adopted rules of procedure to facilitate conciliation proceedings. More recently, the PCA supported the conciliation proceedings between Timor-Leste and Australia concerning their maritime boundary in the Timor Sea between 2016 and 2018, which resulted in the conclusion of a maritime boundaries treaty between the parties.

=== Commissions of Enquiry ===
The PCA may also assist parties in establishing commissions of inquiry or other fact-finding mechanisms. Historically, such procedures have been used to clarify disputed factual circumstances between States, including in the 1905 Dogger Bank inquiry between Great Britain and Russia conducted under the auspices of the Hague Conventions. Fact-finding mechanisms remain available to parties who wish to establish an objective record of facts that may facilitate the resolution of a dispute.

== Procedure ==
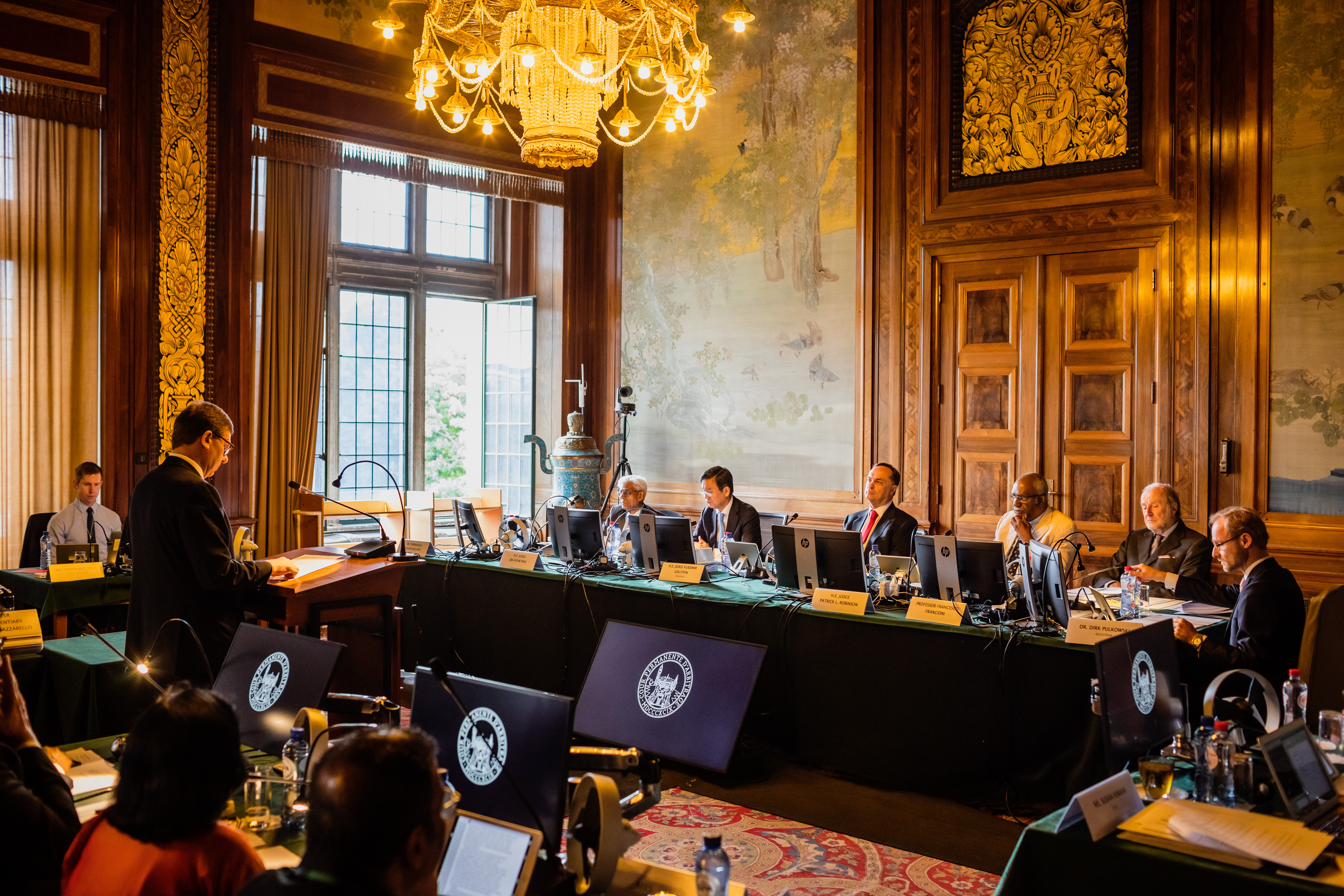
A PCA hearing in July 2019

The rules of arbitration procedure are outlined in Articles 30–57 of the Hague Convention of 1899. These rules are an adapted version of pre-existing treaties among the states. They were amended in 1907, with the creation of a summary procedure for simple cases being the most conspicuous change, and were relevant in the 1920s development of rules for the Court of International Justice.

The first act of parties before the PCA is the submission of the so-called "compromisis", stating the issue and the competence of the arbitrator(s). Proceedings are then conducted in two phases: written pleadings and oral discussion. The Court retires once the debate is over to deliberate and conclude the case by a simple majority of votes.

The decision is published as an award, along with any dissenting opinions. Early Court decisions were countersigned by the arbitrators themselves, but, in 1907, that responsibility was passed to the president and secretary (of the PCA). The award is read in a public session in the presence of the agents and lawyers of the parties to the case. The decision is binding on the parties, and there is no mechanism for appeal.

== History ==
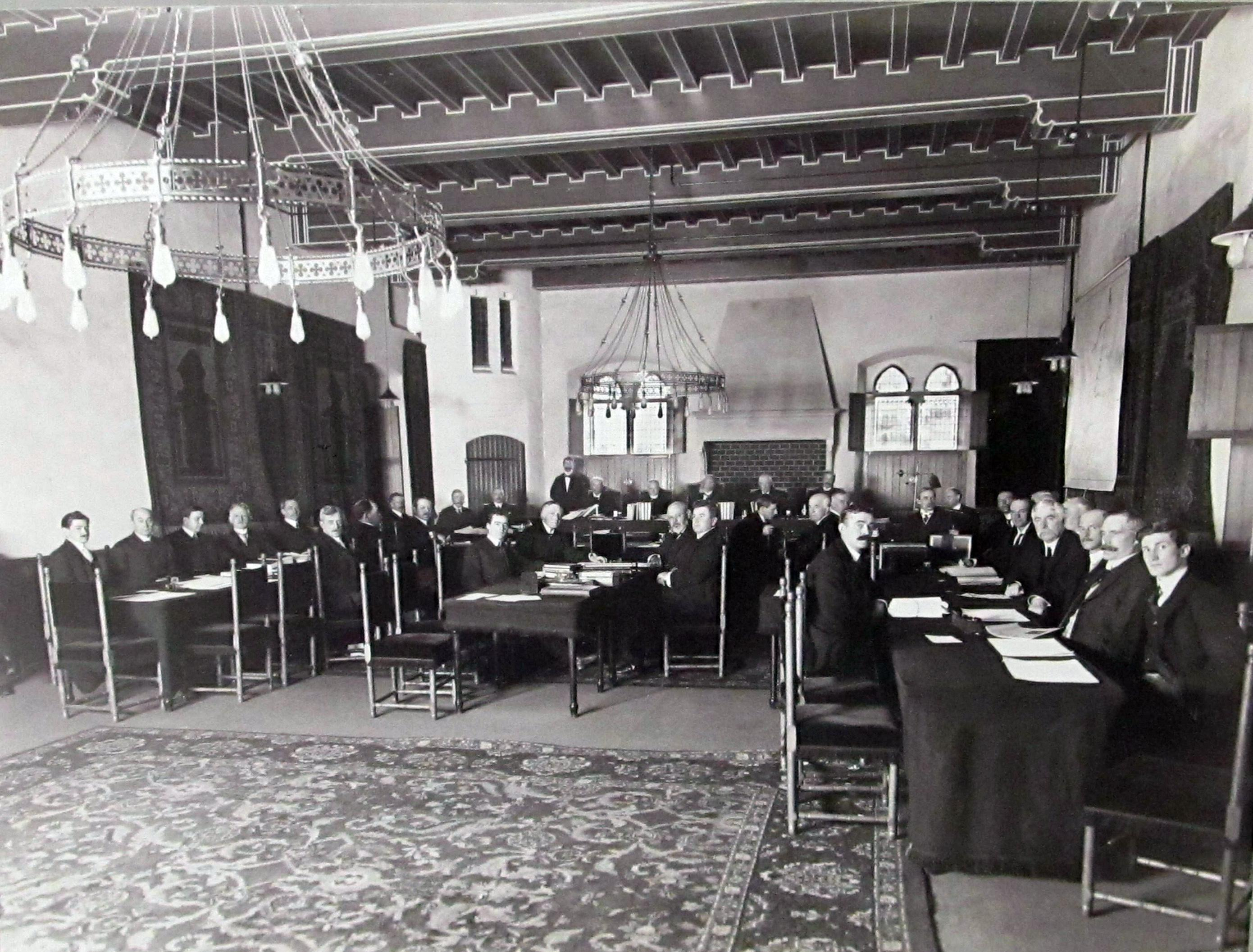
North Atlantic Fisheries Arbitration at the Permanent Court of Arbitration, Prinsegracht 71, The Hague, 1910.

In the late 1800s, States were in the midst of an arms race. Faced with economic challenges caused by the military build-up, as well as the risk of a large-scale armed conflict, Tsar Nicholas II of Russia proposed a conference to develop peaceful mechanisms of settling international disputes "with the object of seeking the most objective means of ensuring to all peoples the benefits of a real and lasting peace, and above all, of limiting the progressive development of existing armaments".

In 1899, delegates from 26 States, including a number of countries in Europe, the Ottoman Empire, the United States, Mexico, China, Japan, the then-Kingdom of Siam, and Persia came to Huis Ten Bosch in The Hague for what has come to be known as the First Hague Peace Conference.

The crowning achievement of the Conference was the 1899 Convention for the Pacific Settlement of International Disputes. The Convention recognized arbitration as “the most effective, and at the same time the most equitable means of settling disputes which diplomacy has failed to settle.” To that end, Articles 20 to 29 of the 1899 Convention established the Permanent Court of Arbitration, to be “accessible to all” and “accessible at all times”. The PCA was the first permanent intergovernmental organization to provide a forum for the resolution of international disputes through arbitration and other peaceful means.

After the success of the First Hague Peace Conference, a Second Peace Conference was held in 1907, which led to the 1907 Convention for the Pacific Settlement of International Disputes. The 1907 Convention lightly amended the 1899 Convention without substantially altering it. Notably, the 1907 Conference was a larger affair, with 44 States present. Many of the additional 18 States came from the Republics of Latin America, which joined the 1899 Convention as a block and later joined the 1907 Convention with the other States present.

Today, signing either of the two Founding Convention is sufficient to become a Contracting Party to the PCA, although many Contracting Parties have signed both.

The Hague was chosen for the 1899 and 1907 Conference and then as the seat of the PCA, for four main reasons. First, it is perceived as a neutral capital. Second, The Hague was easily accessible both by land and by sea. Thirdly, The Hague and the Netherlands were already associated with international law, thanks to Hugo Grotius, considered the father of international law, and his treatise On the Law of War and Peace. Last, but not least, Queen Wilhelmina was a distant cousin of Tsar Nicholas II.

== List of PCA Secretaries-General ==
The current Secretary-General of the PCA is Dr. Hab. Marcin Czepelak, who was elected on 14 February 2022 by the PCA Administrative Council for a term of five years (from 1 June 2022 until 31 May 2027).

The below table lists all the Secretaries-General who have served the PCA since its founding.

Secretary-General	Tenure
Baron R. Melvil van Lynden	1900–1901
Mr. L. H. Ruyssenaers	1901–1905
Baron L. P. M. H. Michiels van Verduynen	1905–1929
Dr. M. A. Crommelin	1929–1947
Jonkheer Aarnout Marinus Snouck Hurgronje	1948–1951
Dr. Alexander Loudon	1951–1953
Prof. Jean Pierre Adrien François	1954–1968
Baron E. O. van Boetzelaar	1968–1980
Mr. J. Varekamp	1981–1990
Mr. P. J. H. Jonkman	1990–1999
Mr. Tjaco T. van den Hout	1999–2008
Mr. Christiaan M. J. Kröner	2008–2011
Mr. Hugo H. Siblesz	2012–2022
Dr. Hab. Marcin Czepelak	2022–present

== Budget and fees ==
The budget of the PCA comes from the contributions of its Contracting Parties and income through arbitration cases. The distribution of the amounts to be paid by the individual Contracting Parties is based on the system in use by the Universal Postal Union.

Parties to arbitration have to pay the expenses of the arbitral tribunal set up to hear the case, including the salary of the arbitrators, registry and administrative functions, but not including overheads of the organization. The costs of arbitration vary from case to case and discussions may be held between the PCA and the parties over fee arrangements.

The fixed costs for action as an appointing authority are €3,000.

== Cases ==
Examples of cases are shown below:

Interstate

- United States of America v. Mexico (Pious Fund of the Californias) (1902)
- United States of America v. United Kingdom (The North Atlantic Coast Fisheries Case) (1910)
- France v. Great Britain (Savarkar Case) (1911)
- United States of America v. The Netherlands (Island of Palmas Case) (1928)
- Eritrea v. Yemen (Hanish Islands conflict) (1999)
- Belgium v. The Netherlands (Iron Rhine case) (2005)
- Croatia v. Slovenia (2017)
- Qatar v. Bahrain (2020)
- Pakistan v. India (Indus Waters Western Rivers Arbitration) (2023)
- Azerbaijan v. Armenia (Energy Charter Treaty Arbitration) (2023)
- Azerbaijan v. Armenia (Bern Convention Arbitration) (2023)
- European Union v. United Kingdom (2024)
- Rwanda v. United Kingdom (Arbitration pursuant to the Asylum Partnership Agreement) (2025)

Interstate: Annex VII UNCLOS

- Barbados v. Trinidad and Tobago (2006)
- Bangladesh v. India (Bay of Bengal Maritime Boundary) (2014)
- Denmark in respect of the Faroe Islands v. European Union (Atlanto-Scandian Herring Arbitration) (2014)
- Mauritius v. United Kingdom (Chagos Marine Protected Area) (2015)
- Philippines v. China (2016)
- Netherlands v. Russia (Greenpeace Arctic Sunrise ship case) (2017)
- Ukraine v. Russia (Coastal State Rights in the Black Sea, Sea of Azov and Kerch Strait) (2017)
- Italy v. India (Enrica Lexie case) (2020)

Investor-state

- Hulley Enterprises Limited (Cyprus), Yukos Universal Limited (Isle of Man) and Veteran Petroleum Limited (Cyprus) v. the Russian Federation (2015)
- Cairn Energy PLC & Cairn UK Holdings Limited v. The Republic of India

Other

- United States v. Iran (Iran-United States Claims Tribunal) in the early 1980s the PCA helped set up the claims tribunal
- Eritrea v. Ethiopia (Eritrea-Ethiopia Claims Commission) (2009) Claims Commission was organized through the PCA
- Sudan v. Sudan People's Liberation Movement (Abyei Arbitration) (2009)

== See also ==
- Ligue internationale de la paix
- International arbitration
- International Court of Justice
- International Court of Arbitration
