= Thomas Mensah (lawyer) =

Ghanaian lawyer (1932–2020)

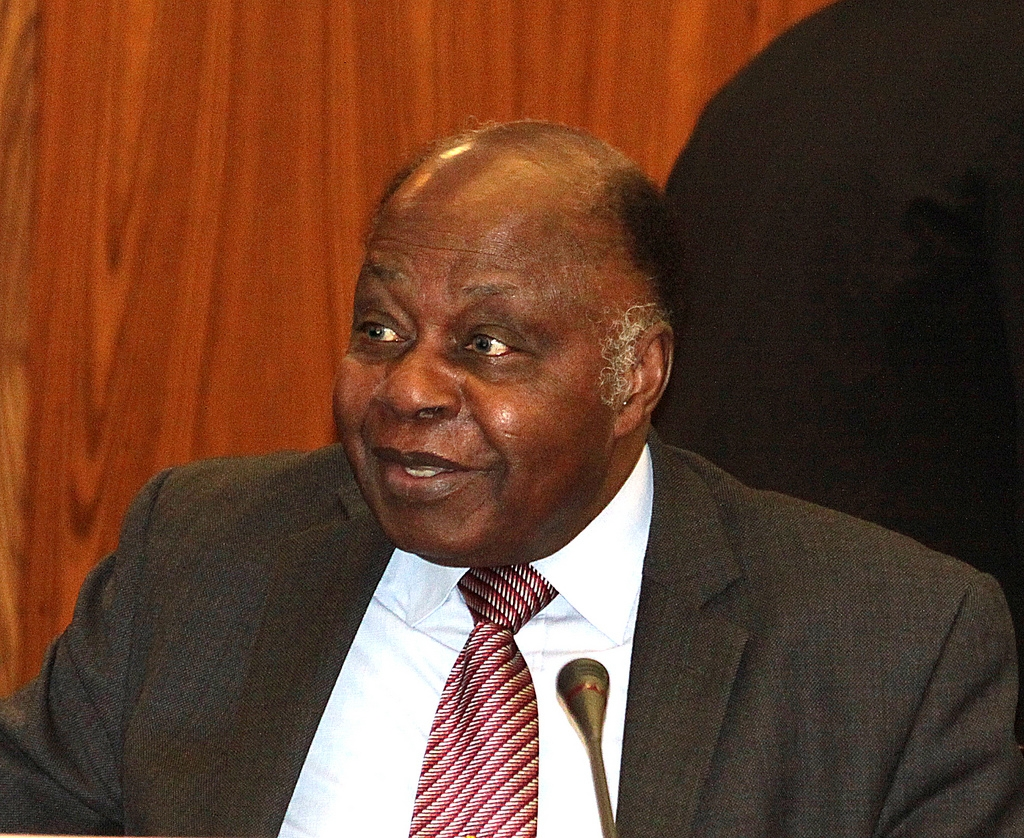
- Born: Thomas Aboagye Mensah; 12 May 1932; Kumasi, Gold Coast (now Ghana)
- Died: 7 April 2020 (aged 87); London, England
- Education: Achimota School
- Alma mater: University of Ghana; University of London; Yale University Law School
- Occupations: Judge, law professor and diplomat
- Known for: Judge at the International Tribunal for the Law of the Sea (ITLOS) (1996–2005)

Thomas A. Mensah (12 May 1932 – 7 April 2020) was a Ghanaian judge, law professor and diplomat who served as judge and president of the International Tribunal for the Law of the Sea (ITLOS) from 1996 to 1999 and continued as a judge from 1999 to 2005. He was the first president of the tribunal. Before his appointment to the tribunal, Mensah was Ghana's High Commissioner to South Africa and a former Assistant Secretary-General at the International Maritime Organization (IMO).

== Early life and education ==
Thomas Aboagye Mensah was born on 12 May 1932 in Kumasi, Gold Coast. He was educated for his high-school education at Achimota School and went on to graduate with a B.A. degree from the University of Ghana in 1956. He earned a Bachelor of Laws from the University of London in 1959. In 1962 he graduated from the Yale University Law School with a Master of Laws and, two years later, he received his Doctor of Juridical Science from Yale.

== Career ==
He returned to Ghana in 1962 and was made a law studies lecturer at the University of Ghana. In addition, he worked from 1965 to 1966 as a judicial officer at the International Atomic Energy Agency in Vienna. In 1966 he became dean of the law school and served until 1968.

From 1968 to 1990, he was legal adviser and assistant to the General Secretariat of the International Maritime Organization (IMO), and from 1981 to 1990 he was a visiting professor at its educational institution, the World Maritime University in Malmö. He was also a professor at the University of Leiden in 1993/1994, and at the Institute for Law of the Sea at the University of Hawaiʻi from 1993 to 1995.

From 1995 to 1996, he was High Commissioner of Ghana in South Africa .

From 1 October 1996, he was a member of the newly founded International Maritime Tribunal in Hamburg. When the court began its work, he was elected its first president for the period from 1996 to 1999, after which he remained a judge at the court until 2005.

He was appointed by Bangladesh in the maritime boundary delimitation dispute between Bangladesh and Myanmar in the Bay of Bengal.

In 2013, he was awarded the International Maritime Prize for 2012 from the IMO Council. He was a president of the IMO and defended the country in a number of lawsuits at the International Court on the Law of the Sea (ITLOS), the most notable one being the boundary proceedings between Ghana and Cote d'Ivoire. He was an expedient judge who represented Ghana in the "ARA Libertad" against Argentina. He has to his credit several publications in the field of public international law, law of the sea, maritime law and international environmental law.

Mensah was the President of a five-member UNCLOS ANNEX VII arbitration tribunal that ruled on the case filed by the Philippines against China, which concerns the disputed territories in the South China Sea, particularly the validity of the nine-dash line claim of China.

== Death ==
Mensah died in London on 7 April 2020, after a short illness and COVID-19.
