= Barbados v. Trinidad and Tobago =

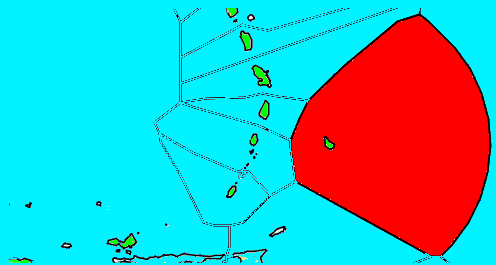
- Maritime of Barbados showing (southern) U.N. instituted boundary
- Court: An arbitral tribunal constituted under Annex VII to the 1982 United Nations Convention on Law of the Sea
- Full case name: An Arbitration before an arbitral tribunal constituted pursuant to article 287, and in accordance with Annex VII, of the United Nations Convention on the Law of the Sea between Barbados and The Republic of Trinidad and Tobago
- Decided: April 11, 2006

Court membership
- Judges sitting: Judge Stephen M. Schwebel, president Mr. Ian Brownlie CBE QC; Professor Vaughan Lowe; Professor Francisco Orrego Vicuña; Sir Arthur Watts

Case opinions
- Decision by: Unanimous panel

Barbados v. Trinidad and Tobago was a 2006 arbitral case between Barbados and Trinidad and Tobago in which the tribunal resolved the maritime border dispute between the two countries. The dispute was arbitrated before an arbitral tribunal constituted under Annex VII of the United Nations Convention on the Law of the Sea, in which the Permanent Court of Arbitration served as registry.

== Background ==
In 1990, Venezuela and Trinidad and Tobago signed a maritime boundary treaty. The treaty purported to assign to Trinidad and Tobago ocean territory that Barbados claimed as its own. The countries were unable to resolve their dispute for 14 years. In 2004, Barbados elected to force the issue into binding arbitration under the United Nations Convention on the Law of the Sea. The arbitral tribunal heard the case.

== Tribunal award ==
The tribunal's award was issued on 11 April 2006. The boundary was set nearly midway between the land of the two island countries. Although neither country's claimed boundary was adopted by the court, the boundary that was set was closer to that claimed by Trinidad and Tobago. Both countries claimed victory after the arbitration award was announced.

== See also ==
- Barbados – Trinidad and Tobago relations
