= Boundary delimitation =

Boundary delimitation may refer to:

- Electoral boundary delimitation, the drawing of electoral borders
- National boundary delimitation, the drawing of international borders
