= Alain Pellet =

French lawyer (born 1947)

- Born: 2 January 1947 (age 79); Paris
- Occupation: Lawyer
- Title: Professor emeritus at Paris Nanterre University
- Children: Four
- Awards: Chevalier of the Legion of Honour

Academic background
- Education: Faculty of Law of Paris
- Thesis: Recherche sur les principes généraux de droit en droit international public (1974)

Academic work
- Discipline: Public international law
- Institutions: Paris Nanterre University
- Notable works: La Charte des Nations Unies en 2 volumes: Commentaire article par article
- Website: Official website

Alain Pellet (born 2 January 1947) is a French lawyer who teaches international law and international economic law at the Université de Paris Ouest - Nanterre La Défense. He was director of the university's Centre de Droit International (CEDIN) between 1991 and 2001. He is the author of numerous books.

Pellet is an expert in international law, a member and former president of the United Nations International Law Commission, and is or has been counsel for many governments, including the French government, in the area of public international law. He also served as an expert on the Badinter Arbitration Committee, as well as rapporteur of the French Committee Jurists on the Creation of an International Criminal Tribunal for Former Yugoslavia ("TRUCHE Commission"), the inception for the French project to create the International Criminal Tribunal for the former Yugoslavia.

Pellet has worked as agent or counsel and lawyer in more than 35 cases before the International Court of Justice and has participated in several international and transnational arbitrations (in particular in the area of investment). Following the Annexation of Crimea by the Russian Federation, he represented Russia before the International Court of Justice and two arbitral tribunals in disputes brought by Ukraine. He resigned after the 2022 Russian invasion of Ukraine.

Pellet has been a Chevalier of the Légion d'Honneur since 1998.

== Academic qualifications ==
Pellet has a bachelor of laws (public law) (1968 – Faculty of Law and Economics, Paris), a diploma from the Institute of Political Studies, Paris (Sciences Po) (1968 – public service section). He also obtained advanced studies diplomas in political science and public law (1969 – Faculty of Law and Economics, Paris), as well as a State doctorate in public law (1974 – Panthéon-Assas University – Assas, Paris) and the "Agrégation" in public law and political science (1974). He has served as auditor at the Academy of International Law, The Hague (public international law courses, 1967, 1969 and 1971).

== Works ==
- Droit international public, co-author with P. Daillier and M. Forteau (8th ed., 2009)
- La Charte des Nations Unies, Constitution mondiale ?, co-edited with R. Chemain (2006)
- "Articles 19 et 22" and, with William Schabas, article 23 (Réserves) in O. Corten and P. Klein, eds., Les Conventions de Vienne sur le droit des traités – Commentaire article par article (2006)
- "Article 38" in A. Zimmermann, Ch. Tomuschat and K. Oellers-Frahm, The International Court of Justice – A Commentary (2006)
- La Charte des Nations Unies en 2 volumes: Commentaire article par article, co-edited with J.-P. COT (3rd ed., 2005)
- Droit international pénal, co-edited with H. Ascensio and E. Decaux (2000)
