= List of islands in the Chagos Archipelago =

The atolls and banks of the Chagos Archipelago

The Chagos Archipelago is a group of coral atolls, reefs and submerged banks in the central Indian Ocean, at the southern end of the Chagos–Laccadive Ridge. Its islands lie on five atolls: Diego Garcia, Peros Banhos, the Salomon Islands, the Great Chagos Bank and the Egmont Islands. Blenheim Reef is exposed only at low water, and about a dozen other atolls and banks, among them Speakers Bank and Pitt Bank, are permanently submerged.

Sources give the number of islands as about 55, 58 or 59, (Note: About 55: the 2012 conservation management plan and Carr and colleagues (2021); about 58: the BIOT Administration and Harper and colleagues (2019); 59: the dataset of Sheppard and Topp. The counts for individual atolls also differ (see the table of atolls).) and Sheppard and colleagues note that the number varies with the height of the tide and the movement of sand banks; the BIOT Administration calls it "ever-changing". Estimates of their total land area range from 48.07 km^{2} (18.56 sq mi) to 52.98 km^{2} (20.46 sq mi), and Diego Garcia accounts for more than half of it. (Note: Sources give different figures. A dataset of Sheppard and Topp gives 4,807 ha (48.07 km^{2}) for 59 islands, of which the Diego Garcia islands make up 2,734 ha; the GIS estimates of Dumbraveanu and Sheppard give 52.98 km^{2}, of which Diego Garcia accounts for 29.17 km^{2}; the 2012 conservation management plan gives Diego Garcia as 2,719.5 ha and "over half of the total land area"; Sheppard and colleagues (2012) give Diego Garcia as 29.7 km^{2}, half the land area; Stoddart (1971) gives about 30 km^{2} of land on Diego Garcia; the United Kingdom's Counter-Memorial of 2013 gives about 30 km^{2} for Diego Garcia and about 60 km^{2} in all; Mauritius's Memorial of 2012 gives 27.20 km^{2} for Diego Garcia; Harper and colleagues give about 5,000 ha in all and about 2,900 ha for Diego Garcia; and the BIOT Administration gives around 50 km^{2} in all, of which Diego Garcia makes up 44 km^{2}.)

From the late 18th century coconut plantations were established on Diego Garcia, Peros Banhos and the Salomon Islands, and also on Eagle Island, the Three Brothers and the Egmont group. The outlying plantations were abandoned between the 1850s and the 1930s, and after the United Kingdom made the archipelago available for a United States military base on Diego Garcia, the whole population was either prevented from returning or removed, the last inhabitants leaving in 1973. Around 2,000 people, mostly military personnel and contractors, are now ordinarily present on Diego Garcia, and since February 2026 a small group of Chagossians has camped without permits on Île du Coin in Peros Banhos.

The archipelago is administered by the United Kingdom as the British Indian Ocean Territory and is claimed by Mauritius. Under a treaty signed on 22 May 2025 the United Kingdom would recognise Mauritian sovereignty, but as of October 2026 the treaty had not entered into force. The islands of the Great Chagos Bank, the eastern half of Peros Banhos and parts of Diego Garcia are strict nature reserves, and four groups of islands are Important Bird Areas. Diego Garcia was designated a Ramsar site in 2001, and since 2010 the surrounding waters, except those of Diego Garcia, have formed a marine protected area.

== Atolls with islands ==
Atolls with islands, from north to south
Atoll	Islands in the dataset	Other counts	Land area, dataset (km^{2})	Land area, GIS estimate (km^{2})	Reef flats awash at low water (km^{2})	Location	Description
Peros Banhos	31	More than 25	9.525	10.41	35.21	5°20′S 71°51′E	Lagoon up to 75 m deep, with wide entrances; islets all low, the highest 3.7 m
Salomon Islands	10	11	2.63	3.23	9.74	5°22′S 72°13′E	About 4 by 3 nautical miles; lagoon up to 31 m deep, entered by a passage in the north-west
Great Chagos Bank	8	8	4.365	7.04	7 (Note: Estimated by interpolation.)	6°13′S 72°05′E	Largely submerged atoll of about 13,500 km^{2}, with islands on its northern and western rims only
Egmont Islands	5	4; 6	4.21	3.13	9.85	6°40′S 71°21′E	Elliptical atoll about 6 by 2 nautical miles, with islands on its south-western rim
Diego Garcia	5	Main island and 3 islets	27.34	29.17	23.06	7°17′S 72°24′E	About 13 by 6 nautical miles; land round about 90 per cent of the rim, enclosing a lagoon of 124 km^{2} up to 31 m deep
Total	59		48.07	52.98	84.86		

== Islands ==
=== Diego Garcia ===
Diego Garcia from the Sentinel-2 satellite, 2021

Diego Garcia, the southernmost atoll, has the largest island of the archipelago: a rim of land that extends round about 90 per cent of the atoll and encloses a lagoon of 124 km^{2} (48 sq mi). The lagoon opens to the sea only in the north, where three small islets lie in its entrance. The land is generally 1–1.5 m (3.3–4.9 ft) high. The joint British and American military facility occupies the western arm, while the eastern arm, most of the lagoon and the seaward reefs to 3 nautical miles form a Ramsar site that excludes the area of the base. The northern part of the eastern arm and the three islets are strict nature reserves, and the eastern arm and the islets form an Important Bird Area, which qualifies for its colony of red-footed boobies. Unauthorised vessels may not approach within 3 nautical miles of the atoll.

Islands of Diego Garcia
Island (Note: The name approved in the GEOnet Names Server, the repository of foreign place names approved by the United States Board on Geographic Names, which is maintained by the National Geospatial-Intelligence Agency; for islands that it does not list, the name used in the dataset of Sheppard and Topp.)	Other names and spellings (Note: Where the dataset of Sheppard and Topp, the source of the areas, uses a different form, that form is given first; other names and spellings are cited individually.)	Area (ha) (Note: From a dataset compiled by Charles Sheppard and John Topp, which accompanies botanical records for 59 islands made between 1971 and 1998; the areas are given in hectares and converted here to square kilometres. The dataset gives subtotals of 2,734 ha for Diego Garcia, 952.5 ha for Peros Banhos, 263 ha for the Salomon Islands, 436.5 ha for the Great Chagos Bank and 421 ha for the Egmont Islands, a total of 4,807 ha. Some later field studies give different areas for individual islands, which are noted in the tables. A blank cell means that the dataset does not list the island under that name.)	Area (km^{2})	Coordinates (Note: Positions of the features listed in the GEOnet Names Server, whose country file for the British Indian Ocean Territory was last updated on 21 October 2026. Its disclaimer states that the names and associated data "may not reflect the views of the United States Government on the sovereignty over geographic features". A blank cell means that the server does not list the island.)	Status	Notes
Diego Garcia (main island)		2,719	27.19	7°18′46″S 72°27′06″E (Note: Position of the atoll.)	Military facility on the western arm; Ramsar site (eastern arm and most of the lagoon); strict nature reserve on the northern part of the eastern arm; eastern arm part of an Important Bird Area (Eastern Diego Garcia island group)	Former plantation settlements of East Point, Pointe Marianne and Minni Minni, evacuated in 1971 (see below); around 2,000 people, mostly military personnel and contractors, ordinarily present. Other sources give the area as 29.17, 29.7, about 30 and 44 km^{2}.
West Island	West Islet	7.5	0.075	7°14′53″S 72°23′05″E	Strict nature reserve; Important Bird Area (Eastern Diego Garcia island group)	One of three islets in the lagoon entrance, visible from 5 nautical miles; the dredged Entrance Channel passes between it and Spur Reef.
Middle Island	Middle Islet	2	0.02	7°13′43″S 72°24′31″E	Strict nature reserve; Important Bird Area (Eastern Diego Garcia island group)	In the lagoon entrance.
East Island	East Islet	5	0.05	7°13′37″S 72°25′09″E	Strict nature reserve; Important Bird Area (Eastern Diego Garcia island group)	In the lagoon entrance, opposite Barton Point; Edis describes it as the largest of the three islets and a roost of red-footed boobies. (Note: Edis described East Island as the largest of the islets at the mouth of the lagoon; the dataset of Sheppard and Topp gives 7.5 ha for West Island and 5 ha for East Island.)
Anniversary Island	Anniversary	0.5	0.005	7°14′16″S 72°24′12″E		Listed in the dataset beside the Diego Garcia islets and counted in its Diego Garcia subtotal. (Note: The dataset of Sheppard and Topp lists Anniversary next to the islets of Diego Garcia, and its Diego Garcia subtotal of 2,734 ha includes it; the GEOnet Names Server lists an Anniversary Island at a position between West Island and Middle Island. Sheppard and colleagues and the sailing directions mention only three islets in the lagoon entrance.)
Diego Garcia (dataset subtotal)		2,734	27.34	Islands of the atoll: 29.17 km^{2} in the estimates of Dumbraveanu and Sheppard		

=== Peros Banhos ===
Map of Peros Banhos showing the strict nature reserve in the east of the atoll

Peros Banhos, in the north-west of the archipelago, has the most islands: 31 in the dataset of Sheppard and Topp, and more than 25 according to the United Kingdom. The atoll keeps its Portuguese name. Its islets, all low and with wide passages between them, lie on the rim of a lagoon up to 75 m (246 ft) deep, and the sailing directions warn that they "undergo considerable alteration", one monsoon washing away parts of them and the next building up new land. Carr and colleagues describe Peros Banhos as an atoll of two halves: the islands to the west of Île Vache Marine and Île de la Passe have been impoverished by rats and by the clearance of native forest for coconuts, while the eastern half is a strict nature reserve with important seabird colonies. In 2019 Île Yéyé was the only island in the reserve still infested by rats. Visiting yachts with permits may moor off Île Diamant, Île du Coin and Île Fouquet.

Islands of Peros Banhos, clockwise from Île du Coin
Island	Other names and spellings	Area (ha)	Area (km^{2})	Coordinates	Status	Notes
Île du Coin	Coin; Ile du Coin; Isle de Coin	127	1.27	5°27′14″S 71°45′58″E	Former plantation headquarters, evacuated in 1973; Chagossian camp since February 2026; yacht mooring site	Historically an administrative centre; an abandoned church, graves and derelict buildings remain. Harper and colleagues give 126 ha. See Resettlement of Île du Coin.
Île Anglaise	Anglais	12	0.12	5°26′23″S 71°45′12″E		A shoal with a depth of 2.7 m lies about 1.5 nautical miles to the east.
Île Monpatre	Monpatre	15	0.15	5°25′26″S 71°45′06″E		
Île Gabrielle	Gabrielle	2	0.02	5°25′23″S 71°44′59″E		
Île Poule	Poule	108	1.08	5°24′21″S 71°45′03″E		
Petite Soeur		41.5	0.415	5°21′50″S 71°45′19″E		
Grande Soeur	Grand Soeur	64	0.64	5°20′42″S 71°44′59″E		
Île Finon	Finon	2	0.02	5°19′56″S 71°44′41″E		
Île Verte	Verte	2	0.02	5°19′44″S 71°44′36″E		
Île Manon	Manon	2	0.02	5°18′54″S 71°44′11″E		
Île Pierre	Pierre	150	1.50	5°17′43″S 71°44′12″E		The largest island of the atoll in the dataset.
Petite Île Mapou	Petite Mapou	2	0.02	5°16′24″S 71°44′49″E		
Grande Île Mapou	Grande Mapou	19.5	0.195	5°15′56″S 71°45′03″E		
Île Diamant	Diamante; Ile Diamante	88.5	0.885	5°15′12″S 71°45′48″E	Yacht mooring site	The anchorage off the island is preferred during the north-west monsoon; Benares Shoals lie 5.5 nautical miles to the west.
Petite Île de la Passe	Petit Passe	2	0.02	5°14′00″S 71°49′02″E		
Île de la Passe	Passe	22.5	0.225	5°14′32″S 71°48′57″E	Strict nature reserve (Note: The BIOT Administration defines the Peros Banhos strict nature reserve as all the waters, land and intertidal areas of the atoll to the east of a line between the eastern extremities of Moresby Island and Fouquet Island. Carr and colleagues describe the eastern half of the atoll, made up of the islands of the Eastern Peros Banhos island group, as a strict nature reserve.); Important Bird Area (Eastern Peros Banhos island group)	
Moresby	Moresby Island; Moresby Islands	43.5	0.435	5°14′14″S 71°49′36″E (Note: Position of the feature "Moresby Islands", which the GNS lists as a group of islands.)	Strict nature reserve; Important Bird Area (Eastern Peros Banhos island group)	Has intact native Pisonia forest and Lumnitzera mangroves; the reserve is bounded by a line from the eastern extremity of Moresby Island.
Île Saint Brandon	St Brandon; Île Saint-Brandon	2	0.02	5°14′54″S 71°50′02″E	Strict nature reserve; Important Bird Area (Eastern Peros Banhos island group)	
Île Parasol	Parasol; Ile Parasole	7.5	0.075	5°15′50″S 71°50′38″E	Strict nature reserve; Important Bird Area (Eastern Peros Banhos island group)	One of the ten islands designated individually as Important Bird Areas on the basis of counts made in 1975 and 1996.
Île Longue	Longue	25.5	0.255	5°16′10″S 71°52′10″E	Strict nature reserve; Important Bird Area (Eastern Peros Banhos island group)	One of the ten islands designated individually as Important Bird Areas on the basis of counts made in 1975 and 1996.
Grande Île Bois Mangue	Grande Bois Mangue; Grand Bois Mangue	14.5	0.145	5°16′11″S 71°53′46″E	Strict nature reserve; Important Bird Area (Eastern Peros Banhos island group)	
Petite Île Bois Mangue	Petite Bois Mangue	8.5	0.085	5°16′16″S 71°53′08″E	Strict nature reserve; Important Bird Area (Eastern Peros Banhos island group)	One of the ten islands designated individually as Important Bird Areas on the basis of counts made in 1975 and 1996, and the only one to qualify every time it was surveyed in 2008–2018.
Île Manöel	Manoel; Île Manoël; Île Manoel	50	0.50	5°15′34″S 71°55′21″E	Strict nature reserve; Important Bird Area (Eastern Peros Banhos island group)	
Little Yeye		0.5	0.005			Listed only in the dataset.
Île Yéyé	Yeye; Île Yeye; Île Yēyē	58.5	0.585	5°14′35″S 71°57′44″E	Strict nature reserve; Important Bird Area (Eastern Peros Banhos island group)	In 2019 the only island of the eastern Peros Banhos reserve still infested by rats; Harper and colleagues give 61 ha.
Petite Île Coquillage	Petite Coquillage	17	0.17	5°20′22″S 71°58′23″E	Strict nature reserve; Important Bird Area (Eastern Peros Banhos island group)	Proposed as an Important Bird Area in its own right after a survey in 2006.
Grande Île Coquillage	Grande Coquillage; Grand Coquillage	15	0.15	5°22′22″S 71°58′12″E	Strict nature reserve; Important Bird Area (Eastern Peros Banhos island group)	Proposed as an Important Bird Area in its own right after a survey in 2006.
Coin du Mire	Gunners Coign	0.5	0.005	5°25′40″S 71°52′52″E	Strict nature reserve; Important Bird Area (Eastern Peros Banhos island group)	
Île Vache Marine	Vache Marine	8	0.08	5°25′28″S 71°49′47″E	Strict nature reserve; Important Bird Area (Eastern Peros Banhos island group)	On the southern rim of the atoll; never inhabited; cleared of black rats in 2014 and still rat-free in 2017. Harper and colleagues give 12.4 ha.
Île Fouquet	Fouquet; Fouquet Island	39.5	0.395	5°27′47″S 71°48′40″E	Yacht mooring site	The quietest anchorage in the atoll lies off the island, 1.7 nautical miles east of Île du Coin; the reserve is bounded by a line from its eastern extremity. (Note: The GEOnet Names Server and the BIOT Administration list an Île Fouquet both in Peros Banhos and in the Salomon Islands. The dataset of Sheppard and Topp lists Fouquet only once, among the islands of Peros Banhos, and has ten islands in the Salomon Islands, against eleven in the United Kingdom's Counter-Memorial of 2013.)
Mapou du Coin		2	0.02	5°27′45″S 71°47′34″E		
Peros Banhos (dataset subtotal)		952.5	9.525	Islands of the atoll: 10.41 km^{2} in the estimates of Dumbraveanu and Sheppard		

=== Salomon Islands ===
Map of the Salomon Islands

The Salomon Islands, about 25 km (16 mi) east of Peros Banhos, form a small atoll about 4 by 3 nautical miles, whose lagoon is entered through a passage in the north-west. They are named after the French ship Salomon, which visited them in 1777. Carr and colleagues describe all the islands except Île Mapou as infested by rats and deforested; rats were eradicated from the small islets of Île du Sel and Île Jacobin in 2014. The dataset of Sheppard and Topp lists ten islands, while the United Kingdom and the GEOnet Names Server give eleven. Yachts with permits may moor off Île Boddam and off Île Fouquet and Île Takamaka.

Islands of the Salomon Islands
Island	Other names and spellings	Area (ha)	Area (km^{2})	Coordinates	Status	Notes
Île Boddam	Boddam; Boddam Island; Ile Boddam	108.5	1.085	5°21′33″S 72°12′20″E	Former plantation settlement, closed in 1972; yacht mooring site	Named after Rawson Hart Boddam, Governor of Bombay; the settlement was on the east side of the island. Fossil coral on its reef flat has been dated to about 5,200 years ago.
Île Diable	Diable	0.5	0.005	5°20′46″S 72°12′14″E		
Île Anglaise	Anglais	75.5	0.755	5°19′33″S 72°13′21″E		
Île de la Passe	Passe	26	0.26	5°18′09″S 72°15′12″E		
Île Mapou	Mapou	4	0.04	5°18′41″S 72°15′53″E		The only island of the atoll free of rats, according to Carr and colleagues.
Île Takamaka	Takamaka	44	0.44	5°19′52″S 72°16′16″E	Yacht mooring site	Has thickets of native Calophyllum.
Île Fouquet	Fouquet			5°20′30″S 72°15′59″E	Yacht mooring site	Not in the dataset.
Île Sepulture	Sepulture	0.5	0.005	5°20′57″S 72°15′13″E		
Île Jacobin	Jacobin	1.5	0.015	5°21′02″S 72°14′44″E		Rats eradicated in 2014; none detected in 2017. Harper and colleagues give 1.6 ha.
Île du Sel	Sel	2	0.02	5°21′17″S 72°13′37″E		Rats eradicated in 2014; none detected in 2017. Harper and colleagues give 2.2 ha.
Île Poule	Poule	0.5	0.005	5°21′32″S 72°13′16″E		
Salomon Islands (dataset subtotal)		263	2.63	Islands of the atoll: 3.23 km^{2} in the estimates of Dumbraveanu and Sheppard		

=== Great Chagos Bank ===
The Eagle Islands (left) and Danger Island (right) photographed from the International Space Station in January 2003

The Great Chagos Bank is a largely submerged atoll of about 13,500 km^{2} (5,200 sq mi), which Sheppard and colleagues describe as the world's largest atoll by area; it has only eight islands, all on its western and northern rims. Nelsons Island lies alone on the northern edge, and the Three Brothers, the Eagle Islands and Danger Island on the western side. The Three Brothers keep their Portuguese name, Tres Irmãos, and Eagle Island is named after the British ship Eagle, which called in 1772. All the islands are strict nature reserves, and vessels may not approach within 3 nautical miles of them. According to Carr and colleagues, the bank's rat-free islands are among the most important in the archipelago for breeding seabirds; an attempt to clear rats from Eagle Island failed in 2006. The plantations on the Three Brothers and Eagle Island were abandoned in the 1850s and the 1930s respectively.

Islands of the Great Chagos Bank, from north to south-west
Island	Group	Other names and spellings	Area (ha)	Area (km^{2})	Coordinates	Status	Notes
Nelsons Island	–	Nelson; Nelson's Island; Nelson Island	81	0.81	5°40′54″S 72°18′56″E	Strict nature reserve; Important Bird Area (Nelson Island)	Uninhabited; on the northern edge of the bank, with a deep channel to its east leading to an anchorage inside the rim. Formerly an Important Bird Area in its own right.
North Brother	Three Brothers	North Island			6°08′13″S 71°30′12″E	Strict nature reserve; Important Bird Area (Western Great Chagos Bank island group)	Formerly an Important Bird Area in its own right. (Note: The dataset of Sheppard and Topp names the three main islands West Brother (6 ha), Middle Brother (8 ha) and East Brother (23 ha). The GEOnet Names Server lists North Island, Middle Brother and South Brother, with Resurgent Island, and Carr and colleagues use North, Middle and South Brother. The sources consulted do not say which of the dataset's names correspond to North and South Brother, so their areas are left blank. The sailing directions describe the Three Brothers as three islands, with a rocky islet between the middle and eastern islands.)
Middle Brother	Three Brothers		8	0.08	6°09′19″S 71°31′00″E	Strict nature reserve; Important Bird Area (Western Great Chagos Bank island group)	Formerly an Important Bird Area in its own right.
Resurgent Island	Three Brothers	Resurgent	0.5	0.005	6°09′48″S 71°31′46″E	Strict nature reserve; Important Bird Area (Western Great Chagos Bank island group)	
South Brother	Three Brothers				6°10′16″S 71°32′28″E	Strict nature reserve; Important Bird Area (Western Great Chagos Bank island group)	Formerly an Important Bird Area in its own right.
Eagle Island	Eagle Islands	Eagle	234	2.34	6°11′26″S 71°19′33″E	Strict nature reserve; Important Bird Area (Western Great Chagos Bank island group)	Former plantation, abandoned in the 1930s; a failed attempt was made to clear it of rats in 2006. Harper and colleagues give 252 ha.
Cow Island	Eagle Islands	Sea Cow (Note: Called Sea Cow in the dataset of Sheppard and Topp and by Carr and colleagues, and Cow Island by the GEOnet Names Server and the BIOT Administration. The sailing directions describe the Eagle Islands as a northern and a southern island nearly 2 nautical miles apart. The Île Vache Marine of the sources consulted is a different island, in Peros Banhos.)	18	0.18	6°14′08″S 71°17′40″E	Strict nature reserve; Important Bird Area (Western Great Chagos Bank island group)	Formerly an Important Bird Area in its own right.
Danger Island	–	Danger	66	0.66	6°23′00″S 71°15′55″E	Strict nature reserve; Important Bird Area (Western Great Chagos Bank island group)	The westernmost island of the bank; the sea breaks heavily round its coast, and a reef extends 3 nautical miles to the south-south-east. The drying reef south of the island is also part of the reserve. Formerly an Important Bird Area in its own right.
Great Chagos Bank (dataset subtotal)			436.5	4.365	Islands of the bank: 7.04 km^{2} in the estimates of Dumbraveanu and Sheppard		

=== Egmont Islands ===
The Egmont Islands lie on the south-western rim of an elliptical atoll about 6 by 2 nautical miles across, 16 nautical miles south-south-east of Danger Island; the lagoon is entered through a shallow channel in the north. The atoll is named after the British ship Egmont, which called in 1760. It was known in the 19th century as the Six Islands, but most of them have since fused into three islands at low tide, and in 1986 all but Île des Rats were reported to be joined by sand banks that dry at low water. The sources disagree on the names and number of the islands. (Note: The dataset of Sheppard and Topp lists five islands: Soudest, Carre Pate, Lubine, Sipaille and Frigates. The GEOnet Names Server lists six, including Île Tattamucca and Île des Rats but not Frigates; the sailing directions describe "a group of six islands"; and the United Kingdom's Counter-Memorial gives four. The sources consulted do not say whether Frigates is one of the islands listed by the GEOnet Names Server under another name.) The plantation on the atoll was abandoned in the 1930s, and Carr and colleagues describe its islands as infested by rats, deforested and "ecologically devastated".

Islands of the Egmont Islands
Island	Other names and spellings	Area (ha)	Area (km^{2})	Coordinates	Status	Notes
Île Sudest	Soudest; Sudest	150	1.50	6°41′16″S 71°23′16″E		
Île Tattamucca				6°40′55″S 71°22′03″E		Not in the dataset.
Île Carre Pate	Carre Pate	10	0.10	6°40′41″S 71°21′48″E		
Île Lubine	Lubine	177	1.77	6°40′06″S 71°19′52″E		The largest island of the atoll in the dataset.
Île Sipaille	Sipaille	64	0.64	6°39′21″S 71°18′59″E		
Île des Rats				6°38′44″S 71°18′49″E		The north-westernmost islet; in 1986 the only one not joined to the others by sand banks drying at low water. Not in the dataset.
Frigates		20	0.20			Listed only in the dataset.
Egmont Islands (dataset subtotal)		421	4.21	Islands of the atoll: 3.13 km^{2} in the estimates of Dumbraveanu and Sheppard		

== Reefs and banks without islands ==
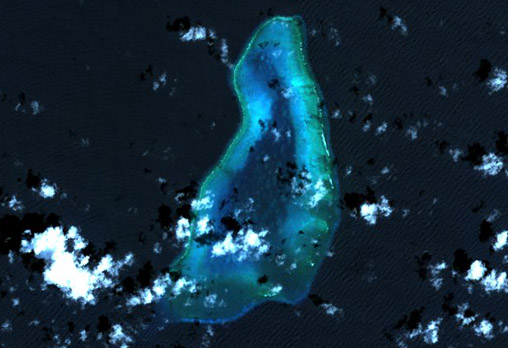
Blenheim Reef, north of the Salomon Islands, in a Landsat 7 image

Besides the five atolls with islands, the archipelago includes Blenheim Reef, an atoll that is awash at low water, and a dozen or so permanently submerged atolls and banks at depths of 6–25 m. The sailing directions advise vessels to avoid the banks, because depths over areas that have been only partly examined are uncertain and the sea sometimes breaks over them unexpectedly.

Reefs and banks without islands, from north to south
Feature	Type	Coordinates (Note: Positions from the United States sailing directions, except Cauvin Bank and Owen Bank, from the GEOnet Names Server.)	Dimensions and depths	Notes
Colvocoresses Reef	Submerged reef	4°54′S 72°37′E	Least charted depth 9 m	8 nautical miles east of Speakers Bank; not closely examined
Speakers Bank	Submerged bank	4°55′S 72°20′E	Extends 24 nautical miles south-south-west from its northern end; 5.5–14.5 m deep at the edge and 42 m near the centre	The northernmost bank of the archipelago; named after the ship Speaker, which surveyed it in 1763
Blenheim Reef	Atoll reef awash at low water	5°12′S 72°28′E	About 6 by 2 nautical miles; covered at high water except at its southern end; lagoon encumbered with rock	Had three low sandy islands according to a report by Archibald Blair in 1787, but is now emergent only in parts of its western rim at low tide; in 2023 an international tribunal gave its low-tide elevations half effect in delimiting the maritime boundary with the Maldives
Benares Shoals	Shoal	5°15′S 71°40′E	Least charted depth 4.6 m	Isolated patch 5.5 nautical miles west of Île Diamant, off the north-west of Peros Banhos
Victory Bank	Submerged bank	5°32′S 72°14′E	5.5 m deep around the edge of the reef and up to 33 m inside	About 18 nautical miles south-east of Peros Banhos; rises steeply from great depths
Cauvin Bank	Submerged bank	6°49′01″S 72°21′02″E		One of the submerged banks south of the Great Chagos Bank
Owen Bank	Submerged bank	6°48′00″S 70°15′00″E		Listed by the GEOnet Names Server; its position lies west of the limits of the archipelago given in the sailing directions (Note: The sailing directions place the archipelago's islands, banks and reefs between longitudes 70°50′E and 72°47′E; the GEOnet Names Server gives Owen Bank's position as 70°15′E.)
Pitt Bank	Submerged bank	7°05′S 71°20′E	Extends 35 nautical miles south-east; steep-to on all sides	South-south-east to south-west of the Egmont Islands; named after the ship Pitt, which surveyed it in 1763
Ganges Bank	Submerged bank	7°23′S 70°58′E	About 3.8 nautical miles long from south-east to north-west; least depth 12 m	Steep-to; marked by a buoy
Wight Bank	Submerged bank	7°25′S 71°31′E	Least charted depth 8.5 m	Depths less than those charted may exist
Centurion Bank	Submerged bank	7°39′S 70°50′E	Least charted depth 11 m	The south-westernmost feature of the archipelago; steep-to

== Former settlements ==
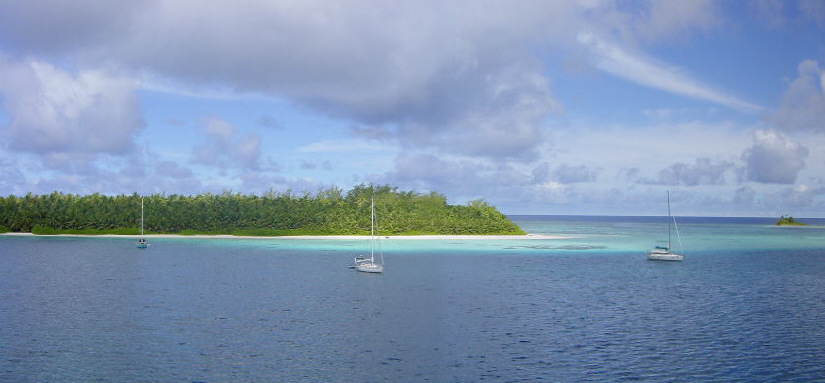
Île Boddam and Île Diable in the Salomon Islands, 2008

From the late 18th century the islands were settled from Mauritius, then the French colony of Île de France, for coconut plantations, which until the 1970s were their only economic activity of significance. In 1793 a factory for copra and coconut oil was set up on Diego Garcia; plantations were opened on the Six Islands in 1808, and on Peros Banhos, the Three Brothers, Eagle Island and the Salomon Islands in 1813. The outlying plantations were later given up as production was concentrated: the Three Brothers in the 1850s, and Eagle Island and the Egmont group in the 1930s. Their people were moved to Peros Banhos and Diego Garcia. A survey in 1964 counted 993 people on the three inhabited atolls.

After the United Kingdom had made the archipelago available for a United States military base, the people of Diego Garcia were shipped away between July and October 1971, most of them to Peros Banhos and the Salomon Islands. The Salomon Islands had closed by November 1972, and the last inhabitants left Peros Banhos on 26 May 1973. Since February 2026 a small group of Chagossians has camped without permits on Île du Coin; six were living there in September 2026 (see Resettlement of Île du Coin).

Former plantation settlements
Settlement or plantation	Atoll	Coordinates (Note: From the GEOnet Names Server; for Pointe Marianne, the position of the point.)	Established	Closed	Notes
East Point	Diego Garcia	7°21′10″S 72°28′04″E	1790s	1971	Established by the brothers Paul and Aimé Cayeux, as was Minni Minni; a Dutch print of 1819 is the first known depiction of the settlement. Assessed in 1864 as producing 51,000 gallons of coconut oil a year. In 1942 the RAF set up an advanced flying-boat unit there. Its manager's house, chapel, jail, hospital and copra mills survive.
Pointe Marianne	Diego Garcia	7°18′46″S 72°25′59″E	By 1838	1971	One of the three estates on the atoll in 1838; assessed in 1864 as producing 30,000 gallons of coconut oil a year. Nine Mauritian and Indian servicemen of the Second World War garrison are buried in a Commonwealth war graves cemetery there.
Minni Minni	Diego Garcia	7°19′01″S 72°28′59″E	1790s	1971	Assessed in 1864 as producing 18,000 gallons of coconut oil a year; a police post set up there in 1885 was withdrawn in 1888. Its remains are overgrown.
Île du Coin	Peros Banhos	5°27′14″S 71°45′58″E	1813 (Note: Plantations were opened on Peros Banhos, the Three Brothers, Eagle Island and the Salomon Islands in 1813, after the British conquest of Mauritius.)	26 May 1973	The plantation headquarters of the atoll; the last of the archipelago's population left from Peros Banhos on 26 May 1973.
Île Boddam	Salomon Islands	5°21′33″S 72°12′20″E	1813	1972	The people refused an order in May 1972 to move to Peros Banhos, but the atoll had closed by November 1972.
Eagle Island	Great Chagos Bank		1813	1930s	Its people were moved to Peros Banhos and Diego Garcia.
Three Brothers	Great Chagos Bank		1813	1850s	Its people were moved to Peros Banhos and Diego Garcia.
Six Islands	Egmont Islands		1808	1930s	In 1856 four labourers rose up and killed the manager. Its people were moved to Peros Banhos and Diego Garcia.

== See also ==
- Geography of the Chagos Archipelago
- Ecology of the Chagos Archipelago
- History of the Chagos Archipelago
- List of islands of the Maldives
- List of islands in the Indian Ocean
- Outer Islands of Mauritius

== Sources ==
=== Court and tribunal decisions ===
- Chagos Islanders v Attorney General and HM BIOT Commissioner, EWHC (QB) 2222 (High Court 9 October 2003).
- Legal Consequences of the Separation of the Chagos Archipelago from Mauritius in 1965, Advisory Opinion (PDF). I.C.J. Reports 2019. International Court of Justice. 25 February 2019. p. 95.
- Dispute concerning delimitation of the maritime boundary between Mauritius and Maldives in the Indian Ocean (Mauritius/Maldives), Judgment (PDF). International Tribunal for the Law of the Sea. 28 April 2023.
- R (Mandarin and others) v HM Commissioner for the British Indian Ocean Territory (Supreme Court of the British Indian Ocean Territory 31 March 2026), Text.
- Memorial of the Republic of Mauritius. Vol. I. Permanent Court of Arbitration. 1 August 2012.
- In the Matter of the Chagos Marine Protected Area Arbitration (Mauritius v. United Kingdom): Award (PDF). Permanent Court of Arbitration. 18 March 2015.
- Counter-Memorial of the United Kingdom. Permanent Court of Arbitration. 15 July 2013.

=== Treaties and official documents ===
- Agreement between the Government of the United Kingdom of Great Britain and Northern Ireland and the Government of the Republic of Mauritius concerning the Chagos Archipelago including Diego Garcia (CS Mauritius No.1/2025, CP 1334) (Report). Foreign, Commonwealth and Development Office. 22 May 2025.
- "About". British Indian Ocean Territory Administration.
- "Mooring Site Plots". British Indian Ocean Territory Administration.
- "Terrestrial Protected Areas". British Indian Ocean Territory Administration.
- "Remembrance Day 2019". British Indian Ocean Territory Administration. 11 November 2019.
- "Diego Garcia Military Base and British Indian Ocean Territory Bill". Hansard, House of Lords. 13 October 2026.
- National Geospatial-Intelligence Agency (2026). Sailing Directions (Enroute): East Africa and the South Indian Ocean (PDF). Pub. 171 (15th ed.). Springfield, Virginia: National Geospatial-Intelligence Agency.
- "British Indian Ocean Territory (IOT)". GEOnet Names Server (Country file). National Geospatial-Intelligence Agency. 21 October 2026.
- "Diego Garcia". Ramsar Sites Information Service. Secretariat of the Convention on Wetlands.
- Sheppard, Charles; Carr, Peter; Graham, Nicholas; et al. (July 2012). Conservation and Management in British Indian Ocean Territory (Chagos Archipelago) (PDF) (Report). Archived from the original (PDF) on 2 November 2012.

=== Books and journals ===
- "Eastern Diego Garcia island group". BirdLife Data Zone. BirdLife International.
- "Western Great Chagos Bank island group". BirdLife Data Zone. BirdLife International.
- "Nelson Island". BirdLife Data Zone. BirdLife International.
- "Eastern Peros Banhos island group". BirdLife Data Zone. BirdLife International.
- "British Indian Ocean Territory". BirdLife Data Zone. BirdLife International.
- Carr, Peter; et al. (March 2021). "Status and phenology of breeding seabirds and a review of Important Bird and Biodiversity Areas in the British Indian Ocean Territory". Bird Conservation International. 31 (1): 14–34. doi:10.1017/S0959270920000295.
- Dullo, W.; Heiss, G.; Sheppard, Charles; Eisenhauer, A. (n.d.). "Estimates of reef and island age for the Chagos islands based on isotopic dating of fossil corals". Chagos Information Portal (Dataset). Chagos Conservation Trust.
- Dumbraveanu, D.; Sheppard, Charles (n.d.). "Substrate area estimates at different depths for the Chagos Archipelago". Chagos Information Portal (Dataset). Chagos Conservation Trust.
- Edis, Richard (1993). Peak of Limuria: The Story of Diego Garcia (PDF). London: Bellew Publishing. ISBN 1-85725-070-2 – via Written Statement of the Republic of Mauritius (ICJ), vol. IV, Annex 136 (extracts).
- Harper, G. A.; Carr, P.; Pitman, H. (2019). "Eradicating black rats from the Chagos – working towards the whole archipelago" (PDF). In Veitch, C. R.; Clout, M. N.; Martin, A. R.; Russell, J. C.; West, C. J. (eds.). Island invasives: scaling up to meet the challenge. Occasional Paper of the IUCN Species Survival Commission no. 62. Gland: IUCN. pp. 26–30.
- Sheppard, C. R. C.; et al. (March 2012). "Reefs and islands of the Chagos Archipelago, Indian Ocean: why it is the world's largest no-take marine protected area". Aquatic Conservation: Marine and Freshwater Ecosystems. 22 (2): 232–261. doi:10.1002/aqc.1248. PMC 4260629. PMID 25505830.
- Sheppard, Charles; Topp, John (n.d.). "Plant distribution across 59 islands in Chagos over 21 years". Chagos Information Portal (Dataset). Chagos Conservation Trust.
- Stoddart, D. R. (1971). "Settlement and development of Diego Garcia". Atoll Research Bulletin (149). Smithsonian Institution: 209–217.
- Stoddart, D. R. (1971b). "Geomorphology of Diego Garcia Atoll". Atoll Research Bulletin (149). Smithsonian Institution: 7–26.
- Vine, David (2009). Island of Shame: The Secret History of the U.S. Military Base on Diego Garcia (PDF). Princeton University Press. ISBN 978-0-691-13869-5 – via Written Statement of the Republic of Mauritius (ICJ), vol. V, Annex 151 (extracts).

=== News and other sources ===
- Arjanee, Ameerah (2 October 2026). "UK-Mauritius Chagos sovereignty deal stalls amid fears of further delays". Al Jazeera English.
- Badshah, Nadeem (17 February 2026). "Four Chagossians return to islands in attempt to stop British transfer to Mauritius". The Guardian.
- "Chagos : la revendication maldivienne ouvre un nouveau front diplomatique". Le Mauricien (in French). 14 September 2026.
- Peerthum, Satyendra (16 October 2018). "The Story of the Settlement of Diego Garcia and the Chagos Archipelago". Le Mauricien.
