= Geography of the Chagos Archipelago =

Chagos Archipelago
- The atolls and banks of the Chagos Archipelago

- Geography of the Chagos Archipelago (Indian Ocean) Location in the Indian Ocean

Geography
- Location: Central Indian Ocean
- Coordinates: 6°00′S 71°30′E (Note: The position given by the World Factbook for the territory. Mauritius gives the position of the archipelago as 6°26′S 72°00′E.)
- Type: Atolls, reefs and submerged banks
- Total islands: 55–59 (Note: About 55 according to the 2012 conservation management plan, "approximately 58" according to the BIOT Administration, which adds that "the nature of coral atolls means this number is ever-changing", and 59 in the dataset of Sheppard and Topp.)
- Major islands: Diego Garcia, Peros Banhos, Salomon Islands, Great Chagos Bank, Egmont Islands (the five atolls with islands)
- Area: 53 km^{2} (20 sq mi) (Note: Sources give different figures. A dataset of Sheppard and Topp gives 4,807 ha (48.07 km^{2}) for 59 islands, of which the Diego Garcia islands make up 2,734 ha; the 2012 conservation management plan gives Diego Garcia as 2,719.5 ha and "over half of the total land area"; Sheppard and colleagues (2012) give Diego Garcia as 29.7 km^{2}, half the land area; Stoddart (1971) gives about 30 km^{2} of land on Diego Garcia; the United Kingdom's Counter-Memorial of 2013 gives about 30 km^{2} for Diego Garcia and about 60 km^{2} in all; the World Factbook gives 60 km^{2}, including 44 km^{2} on Diego Garcia; Mauritius's Memorial of 2012 gives 27.20 km^{2} for Diego Garcia; and the BIOT Administration gives around 50 km^{2} in all, of which Diego Garcia makes up 44 km^{2}.)
- Coastline: 698 km (433.7 mi)
- Highest elevation: 9 m (30 ft) (Note: Stoddart levelled the seaward dunes at Pointe Marianne at almost 7 m above low water, and cites Gilbert Bourne (1888) for a highest point of 30 ft (9 m); the US Navy gives the dunes as 4.5–9 m above mean low water; the former BIOT Commissioner Richard Edis gives a maximum natural elevation of about 25 ft (7.6 m) in dunes near Pointe Marianne; and the World Factbook gives the highest point as "ocean-side dunes on Diego Garcia 9 m".)
- Highest point: Dunes on Diego Garcia

The geography of the Chagos Archipelago concerns a group of coral atolls, reefs and submerged banks in the central Indian Ocean, at the southern end of the Chagos–Laccadive Ridge, which continues northwards through the Maldives and Lakshadweep. The archipelago forms the British Indian Ocean Territory, administered by the United Kingdom, and is claimed by Mauritius; under a treaty signed on 22 May 2025 the United Kingdom would recognise Mauritian sovereignty over it, but the treaty had not entered into force by October 2026.

Five atolls carry islands: Diego Garcia in the south-east, Peros Banhos and the Salomon Islands in the north, the Great Chagos Bank, described by Sheppard and colleagues as the world's largest atoll by area, in the centre, and the Egmont Islands in the south-west; Blenheim Reef is exposed only at low water, and about a dozen other atolls and banks are permanently submerged. The 55 to 59 islands have a combined land area of about 50–53 km^{2} (19–20 sq mi), more than half of it on Diego Garcia, and most of the land is no more than 2 m above sea level. The archipelago's 200-nautical-mile zone covers about 640,000 km^{2} (247,000 sq mi).

The atolls are limestone caps on a volcanic foundation that, in the prevailing model, was built over the Réunion hotspot about 49 million years ago, while the present reef flats formed within roughly the last 5,200 years. The climate is hot and very wet, and tropical cyclones are rare; the archipelago lies at the eastern margin of the Seychelles–Chagos thermocline ridge and is one of the two centres of action of the Indian Ocean Dipole.

Coconut plantations covered most of the larger islands from the late 18th century until the early 1970s, when they closed and the population was removed; since then Diego Garcia, where a British–American military facility occupies the western arm, has been the only inhabited atoll, with around 2,000 people ordinarily present. A small group of Chagossians has lived without permits on Île du Coin since February 2026. Shoreline erosion and sea-level rise are concerns for the low islands, although studies of the tide-gauge records and of shoreline change have reached differing conclusions.

== Location and extent ==
The Chagos Archipelago seen by NASA's MODIS satellite instrument, May 2015. Diego Garcia is the oval atoll in the lower left.

The Chagos Archipelago lies in the central Indian Ocean, on the Chagos–Laccadive Ridge. Its islands, banks and reefs lie between latitudes 4°44′S and 7°39′S and longitudes 70°50′E and 72°47′E. A central area of about 200 by 300 km (120 by 190 mi) contains five atolls with islands, one atoll that is awash at high tide and about a dozen atolls submerged to depths of 6–25 m. The United Kingdom has described the territory as "one of the most isolated island groups in the world". It is almost equidistant from Africa and South-East Asia: the nearest mainland coasts, those of Somalia and Sumatra, are both about 1,500 nautical miles (2,800 km) away, and the Indian subcontinent lies about 1,000 nautical miles (1,900 km) to the north. According to Mauritius, the archipelago lies 1,188 nautical miles (2,200 km) north-east of the island of Mauritius and, at its closest point, 269 nautical miles (500 km) south of the Maldives.

The islands are small and low. Geographic information system estimates by Dumbraveanu and Sheppard give a total land area of 52.98 km^{2} (20.46 sq mi), of which Diego Garcia accounts for 29.17 km^{2} (11.26 sq mi), more than half; reef flats exposed at low tide add a further 84.86 km^{2} (32.76 sq mi). Below low water the archipelago is far larger: Charles Sheppard and colleagues put the area of shallow limestone platform and reef in the photic zone at about 60,000 km^{2} (23,000 sq mi), and note that more than 95 per cent of the territory has never been studied. (Note: The BIOT Administration refers to about 4,000 km^{2} of shallow coral reefs. Sheppard and colleagues note that how much of the larger area of shallow substrate is actively growing reef is uncertain, some areas being eroding and others supporting sand or seagrass.) The 200-nautical-mile zone around the archipelago covers some 640,000 km^{2} (247,000 sq mi), according to the BIOT Administration. (Note: The 2012 conservation management plan gives a recalculated area of 639,661 km^{2} for the marine protected area, which covers the same zone apart from Diego Garcia, and notes that earlier estimates were about 550,000 km^{2}; the arbitral tribunal in Mauritius v United Kingdom described the protected area as covering "more than half a million square kilometres".)

From its creation on 8 November 1965 the British Indian Ocean Territory comprised the Chagos Archipelago, detached from Mauritius, and the islands of Aldabra, Farquhar and Desroches, detached from Seychelles. Those three groups were returned to Seychelles with effect from its independence on 29 June 1976, since when the Chagos Archipelago has constituted the whole territory.

== Physical geography ==
=== Atolls, banks and reefs ===
Peros Banhos (Landsat 7, false colour, 2003)

The Salomon Islands (Space Shuttle, 1992)

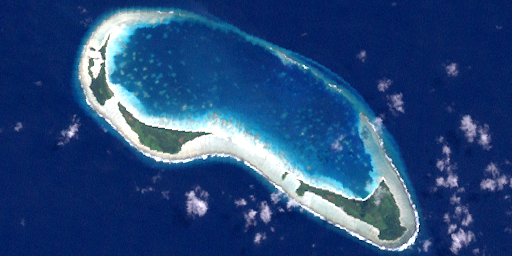
The Egmont Islands (Landsat)

Diego Garcia (Sentinel-2, 2021)

Four of the archipelago's atolls seen from space

The archipelago has five atolls with dry land – Peros Banhos, the Salomon Islands, the Great Chagos Bank, the Egmont Islands and Diego Garcia – together with Blenheim Reef, which is exposed only at low water, and a number of permanently submerged banks and reefs. The number of islands is given as about 55, 58 or 59; Sheppard and colleagues note that it varies with the height of the tide and the movement of sand banks. The largest islands after Diego Garcia are Eagle Island on the Great Chagos Bank, Lubine and Soudest in the Egmont group, Île Pierre and Île du Coin in Peros Banhos, and Île Boddam in the Salomon Islands, each between about 1 and 2.5 km^{2}.

Atolls, reefs and banks of the Chagos Archipelago, from north to south
Feature	Type	Islands (Note: Number of islands listed in the dataset of Sheppard and Topp. Other sources give different counts for some atolls: the United Kingdom's Counter-Memorial gives Peros Banhos "over twenty-five" islands, the Salomon Islands eleven and the Egmont group four; the United States sailing directions describe the Egmont group as six islands and the Three Brothers as three; Sheppard and colleagues give the Great Chagos Bank eight islands; and a British survey of 1964 counted 32 islands in Peros Banhos, eleven in the Salomon Islands and six in the Egmont group. The dataset counts Anniversary Island, at the mouth of the Diego Garcia lagoon, among the islands of Diego Garcia.)	Land area (km^{2}) (Note: Atoll totals from the estimates of Dumbraveanu and Sheppard; figures in italics for the individual islands of the Great Chagos Bank are from the dataset of Sheppard and Topp, converted from hectares.)	Area, dimensions and depths	Notes	Location
Colvocoresses Reef	Submerged reef	0	–	Least charted depth 9 m	Lies 8 nmi east of Speakers Bank; not closely examined	4°54′S 72°37′E
Speakers Bank	Submerged bank	0	–	Extends 24 nmi south-south-west from its northern end; 5.5–14.5 m deep at the edge and 42 m near the centre	The northernmost bank of the archipelago	4°55′S 72°20′E
Blenheim Reef	Atoll reef awash at low water	0	–	About 6 by 2 nmi; covered at high water except at its southern end; lagoon encumbered with rock	Had three low sandy islands according to a report of 1787; now emergent only in parts at low tide	5°12′S 72°28′E
Peros Banhos	Atoll	31	10.41	Lagoon up to 75 m deep, median depth 40 m; reef flats awash at low water 35.21 km^{2}	Islets all low, the highest 3.7 m; wide lagoon entrances; Benares Shoals (least depth 4.6 m) lie 5.5 nmi to the west	5°20′S 71°51′E
Salomon Islands	Atoll	10	3.23	About 4 by 3 nmi, 36 km^{2} overall; lagoon up to 31 m deep, median depth 21 m	Lagoon entered by a north-western passage with a least depth of 5.8 m	5°22′S 72°13′E
Victory Bank	Submerged bank	0	–	5.5 m deep around the edge of the reef and up to 33 m inside	About 18 nmi south-east of Peros Banhos; rises steeply from great depths	5°32′S 72°14′E
Great Chagos Bank	Largely submerged atoll	8	7.04	About 13,500 km^{2}; about 60 nmi from north to south and 90 nmi from east to west; rim with a least depth of 5.5 m, depths inside up to 88 m	Islands on the northern and western rims only; the eastern and southern margins lie about 20 m below the surface	6°13′S 72°05′E
Nelsons Island	Island on the northern rim of the Great Chagos Bank	1	0.81	–	A deep channel close to the east leads to an anchorage inside the rim	5°41′S 72°19′E
Three Brothers	Islands on the western rim of the Great Chagos Bank	4	0.375	A bank with a least depth of 7.0 m extends 11 nmi east-south-east	Three islands, with a rocky islet between the middle and eastern islands; the fourth island in the dataset is Resurgent	6°09′S 71°31′E
Eagle Islands	Islands on the western rim of the Great Chagos Bank	2	2.52	–	Eagle Island (2.34 km^{2}) and Sea Cow (0.18 km^{2}); the sailing directions describe a northern and a southern island 2 nmi apart, 10 nmi west-south-west of the Three Brothers	6°12′S 71°19′E
Danger Island	Island at the western extremity of the Great Chagos Bank	1	0.66	A reef extends 3 nmi south-south-east	The sea breaks heavily round its coast	6°23′S 71°16′E
Egmont Islands	Atoll	5	3.13	Elliptical atoll about 6 by 2 nmi; reef flats awash at low water 9.85 km^{2}	16 nmi south-south-east of Danger Island; islands on the south-western rim, all but one reported in 1986 to be joined at low water by drying sand banks; lagoon entered through a shallow channel in the north	6°40′S 71°21′E
Cauvin Bank	Submerged bank	0	–	–	One of the submerged banks south of the Great Chagos Bank	–
Pitt Bank	Submerged bank	0	–	Extends 35 nmi south-east; steep-to on all sides	Lies south-south-east to south-west of the Egmont Islands	7°05′S 71°20′E
Diego Garcia	Atoll	5	29.17	About 13 by 6 nmi; 170 km^{2} in all, of which the lagoon covers 124 km^{2}; lagoon up to 31 m deep	Land rim round about 90 per cent of the atoll; three islets in the lagoon entrance, and Anniversary Island, which formed in about 1990	7°17′S 72°24′E
Ganges Bank	Submerged bank	0	–	About 3.8 nmi long from south-east to north-west; least depth 12 m	Steep-to	7°23′S 70°58′E
Wight Bank	Submerged bank	0	–	Least charted depth 8.5 m	Depths less than those charted may exist	7°25′S 71°31′E
Centurion Bank	Submerged bank	0	–	Least charted depth 11 m	The south-westernmost feature of the archipelago; steep-to	7°39′S 70°50′E
Total		59	52.98	Reef flats awash at low water, all atolls: 84.86 km^{2}		

==== Diego Garcia ====
Map of Diego Garcia with depths in fathoms, after Gilbert Bourne, from Carl Chun's account of the Valdivia expedition (1903)

Diego Garcia, the southernmost atoll, has a total area of 170 km^{2}, of which the lagoon occupies 124 km^{2} and the land about 30 km^{2}. In the words of the geographer David Stoddart, who studied the atoll in 1967, it has "one of the most continuous land rims of all coral atolls", broken only by the lagoon entrance in the north; the rim varies in width from a few hundred metres to about 2.4 km. The atoll, about 13 by 6 nmi, has been likened to a horseshoe and, by its American residents, to a footprint, with the islets in the lagoon mouth as the toes.

In the south the lagoon shore is deeply indented by barachois, inlets with narrow mouths that open into wide intertidal flats of sand and gravel, the largest being Barachois Sylvain, 2 km long, and Barachois Maurice, 4 km long. Stoddart suggested that they represent an early stage in the formation of the land rim rather than, as the zoologist J. Stanley Gardiner had thought, a late stage in its destruction.

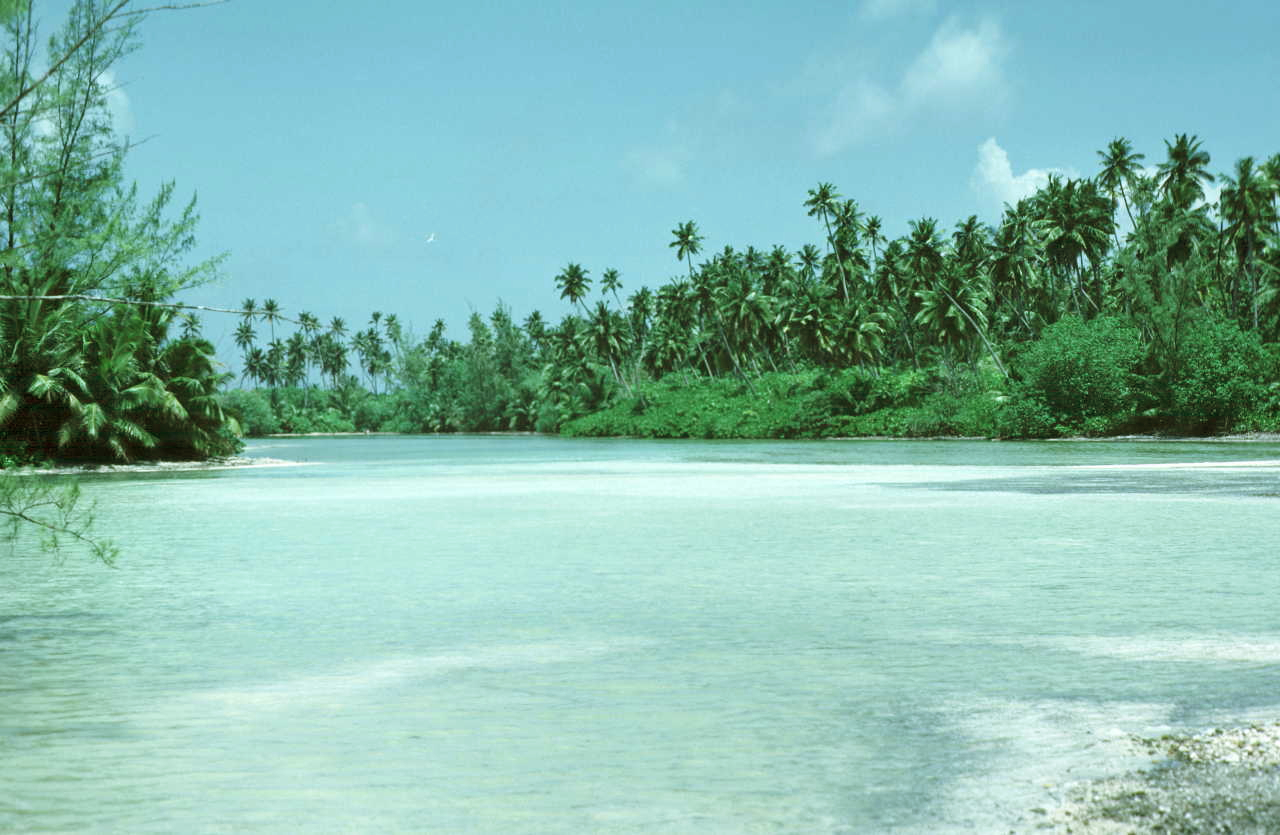
Barachois Maurice, an extensive area of shallows on the lagoon side of Diego Garcia, 1982

Coastal dunes have formed along sectors totalling about 17 km where sand moves along the shore from the south; most other coasts were slightly retreating in 1967. The seaward dunes rise almost 7 m above low water at Pointe Marianne, and in 1888 the zoologist Gilbert Bourne put the highest point of the atoll at 30 feet (9 m).

Three islets lie in the lagoon entrance, East Island being the largest. (Note: Stoddart gives areas of 3.4 ha for West Island (5.4 ha including its rock platform), about 6 ha for Middle Island and 11.75 ha for East Island; the US Navy's natural resources plan of 2005 gives 2.0, 4.98 and 7.49 ha respectively; and the dataset of Sheppard and Topp gives 7.5, 2 and 5 ha.) A fourth, Anniversary Island, formed at the north-western end of Spur Reef and was named in honour of the territory's 25th anniversary in November 1990; the dataset of Sheppard and Topp counts it, with 0.5 ha, among the five islands of Diego Garcia.

The lagoon, almost completely enclosed by land, is unusually shallow for an atoll of its size, with a maximum depth of 31 m. (Note: The US Navy's natural resources plan of 2005 gives the lagoon as 124.1 km^{2} "with depths ranging down to 80 feet (25 m)". Stoddart's maximum of 31 m is from the detailed survey made by HMS Vidal in 1967, with 100–200 soundings per square kilometre.) It has three basins: a northern basin with its floor at 25–30 m, a central basin at 16–20 m, and a southern basin with more intricate relief, cut off by a ridge only 2–4 m deep. Many knolls rise from the floor, but outside the 10 m line virtually none reaches the surface, and Stoddart judged that Diego Garcia "must be almost unique among atolls in the absence of surface patch reefs in the lagoon". The only openings are three passes in the north: Main Pass, the westernmost, 1.6 km wide and about 10 m deep; Middle Pass, 0.6 km wide and 6–7.5 m deep; and Barton Pass, 1 km wide and 6.5–7.5 m deep.

The seaward reef flats are 50–250 m wide, usually about 150 m, and most remain slightly submerged even at low spring tides. Off the northern lagoon entrances the outer slope descends at about 6.5° to 25 m, then steepens to 17° down to 50 m and 48° down to 230 m, and the US Navy records depths of more than 457 m within about 1 km of the shore in places.

==== Peros Banhos ====
Map of Peros Banhos

Peros Banhos, in the north of the archipelago, is a ring of islets round a wide lagoon. It has more islands than any other atoll in the archipelago – 31 in the dataset of Sheppard and Topp, and 32 in a British survey of 1964 – and, at 10.41 km^{2}, the second-largest land area after Diego Garcia. The 1964 survey estimated the lagoon at some 120 square miles (310 km^{2}), and it reaches a depth of 75 m. The atoll is so open, with such wide entrances, that it has no completely sheltered anchorage. The reef flats exposed at low water cover 35.21 km^{2}, the largest area of any atoll in the archipelago.

The islets are all low – the highest is 3.7 m. The US sailing directions warn that "one monsoon washes away portions of them and the next monsoon piles up new land masses". The largest islands are Île Pierre (1.50 km^{2}), Île du Coin (1.27 km^{2}) and Île Poule (1.08 km^{2}); the smaller ones include Île Vache Marine (0.08 km^{2}), which is distinct from the island called Sea Cow on the Great Chagos Bank. Île du Coin was the administrative centre of the atoll in 1964, and the usual anchorage in the south-east trades lies off its northern end; during the north-west monsoon vessels prefer to anchor off Île Diamant, in the north-west of the atoll. At Île Diamant the sea has stripped sand and soil from the shore, leaving dead coconut palms standing on the underlying reef rock. The islands east of a line between Moresby Island and the eastern point of Île Fouquet form a strict nature reserve that vessels may not approach within 3 nmi.

==== Salomon Islands ====
Map of the Salomon Islands

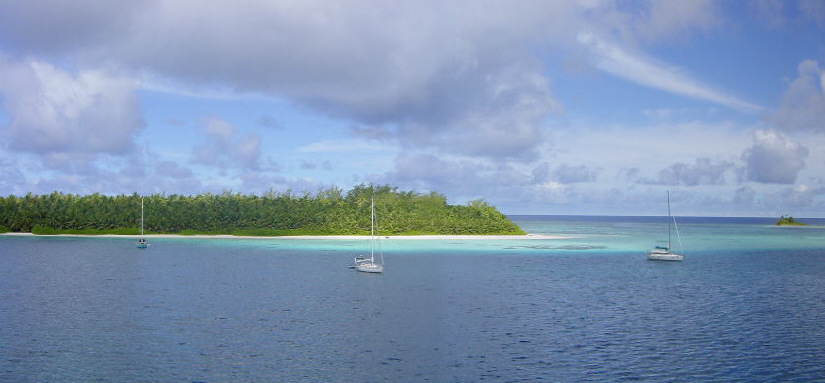
Île Boddam, with Île Diable, 2008

The Salomon Islands, east of Peros Banhos, form a small atoll about 4 by 3 nmi, 36 km^{2} in overall area. The United Kingdom and the 1964 survey count eleven islands round the rim, and the dataset of Sheppard and Topp ten, with a total land area of 3.23 km^{2} according to Dumbraveanu and Sheppard. The lagoon, up to 31 m deep, is entered by a passage on the north-west side with a least depth of 5.8 m, whose bar is impassable during the north-west monsoon.

Île Boddam, the largest island at 1.085 km^{2}, was the administrative centre of the atoll in 1964, and small vessels anchor off the settlement on its eastern side. The other larger islands include Île Anglaise (0.755 km^{2}) and Île Takamaka (0.44 km^{2}). The oldest of the fossil corals dated on the reef flats of the northern islands, about 5,190 years old, came from Boddam. In 2007 flooding was reported up to the stone buildings in the atoll.

==== Great Chagos Bank ====
The Eagle Islands (left) and Danger Island (right) on the western rim of the Great Chagos Bank, photographed from the International Space Station in January 2003

The Great Chagos Bank, which occupies the centre of the archipelago, is a submerged atoll of about 13,500 km^{2} with a broad rim 7–17 m below the surface. Sheppard and colleagues describe it as the world's largest atoll by area, and the United Kingdom as the world's largest drying coral atoll. The US sailing directions give its extent as about 60 nmi from north to south and 90 nmi from east to west. (Note: The United Kingdom describes the bank as "a ring of shallow coral banks enclosing a large lagoon about 100 nautical miles by 60 nautical miles"; the ornithologist W. R. P. Bourne gave its central bank as 120 km across from east to west and about 80 km from north to south.) A narrow coral ridge round its edge has a least depth of 5.5 m, and within it depths reach 88 m.

Its eight islands, with a combined area of about 4.4 km^{2} in the dataset of Sheppard and Topp, lie on the northern and western rims. Nelsons Island (0.81 km^{2}) lies on the northern edge. On the western side the Three Brothers are three islands fringed by reefs, with a rocky islet between the middle and eastern islands; close to their south-west a break in the coral ridge forms a deep channel at least 1.5 nmi wide. The Eagle Islands, 10 nmi west-south-west of the Three Brothers, are a northern island covered with tall coconut palms – Eagle Island, at 2.34 km^{2} the largest island outside Diego Garcia – and a low, wooded southern island nearly 2 nmi away, called Sea Cow in the dataset and Cow Island by the BIOT Administration. Danger Island (0.66 km^{2}), at the western extremity of the bank, lies 8.7 nmi south-south-west of the southern Eagle island; the sea breaks heavily round it, and a reef that breaks in places extends 3 nmi to the south-south-east. All the islands of the bank are strict nature reserves, which may not be approached within 3 nmi.

==== Egmont Islands ====
Map of the Egmont Islands

The Egmont Islands lie on the south-western edge of an elliptical atoll about 6 by 2 nmi, 16 nmi south-south-east of Danger Island. The islands total 3.13 km^{2}, with 9.85 km^{2} of reef flat awash at low tide; the largest are Lubine (1.77 km^{2}) and Soudest, or Sudest (1.50 km^{2}). The atoll was known in the 19th century as the "Six Islands", each separately named, but most of them had fused by 2012 into three islands at low tide, possibly because of tectonic movement or of changing patterns of sedimentation. (Note: The United Kingdom counts four islands, the dataset of Sheppard and Topp five, and the US sailing directions six; the 1964 survey recorded that the group was once said to have seven islands but now had six.) In 1986 all the islets except Île des Rats, the farthest north-west, were reported to be joined by sand banks that dry at low water. The lagoon is entered by a shallow channel through the northern part of the reef.

==== Blenheim Reef ====
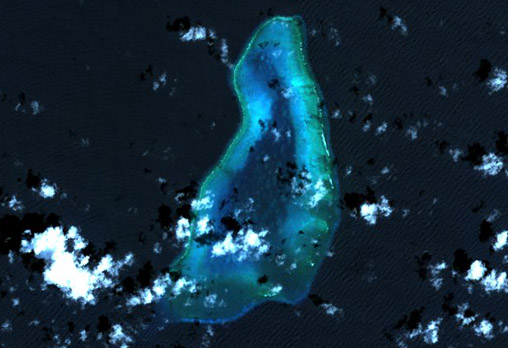
Blenheim Reef in a Landsat 7 image, 2003

Blenheim Reef, north of the Great Chagos Bank and near the Salomon Islands, is an atoll about 6 by 2 nmi that is exposed only at low water. It is steep-to and is covered at high water nearly everywhere except at its southern extremity, and its lagoon is encumbered with rock. According to a report by Archibald Blair in 1787 it had three low sandy islands with low bushes, but it is now submerged except for parts of its western rim at low tide. The reef consists of low-tide elevations, many of them more than 12 nautical miles from Île Takamaka in the Salomon Islands, a distance that affected its status in the delimitation of the maritime boundary with the Maldives in 2023 (see § Maritime zones).

==== Submerged banks and reefs ====
Besides Blenheim Reef, about a dozen atolls and banks lie wholly submerged at depths of 6–25 m. Speakers Bank, the northernmost, extends 24 nmi south-south-west from its northern end; it is 5.5–14.5 m deep at the edge and 42 m near the centre. Colvocoresses Reef, with a least charted depth of 9 m, lies 8 nmi east of Speakers Bank and has not been closely examined. Victory Bank, about 18 nmi south-east of Peros Banhos, rises steeply from great depths to a reef edge 5.5 m deep, with depths of up to 33 m inside.

In the south, Pitt Bank extends 35 nmi south-east from the waters south of the Egmont Islands and is steep-to on all sides. Farther south and west lie Wight Bank, Ganges Bank and Centurion Bank, the south-westernmost feature of the archipelago, with least charted depths of 8.5–12 m. Cauvin Bank is another of the submerged banks south of the Great Chagos Bank.

=== Geology and formation ===
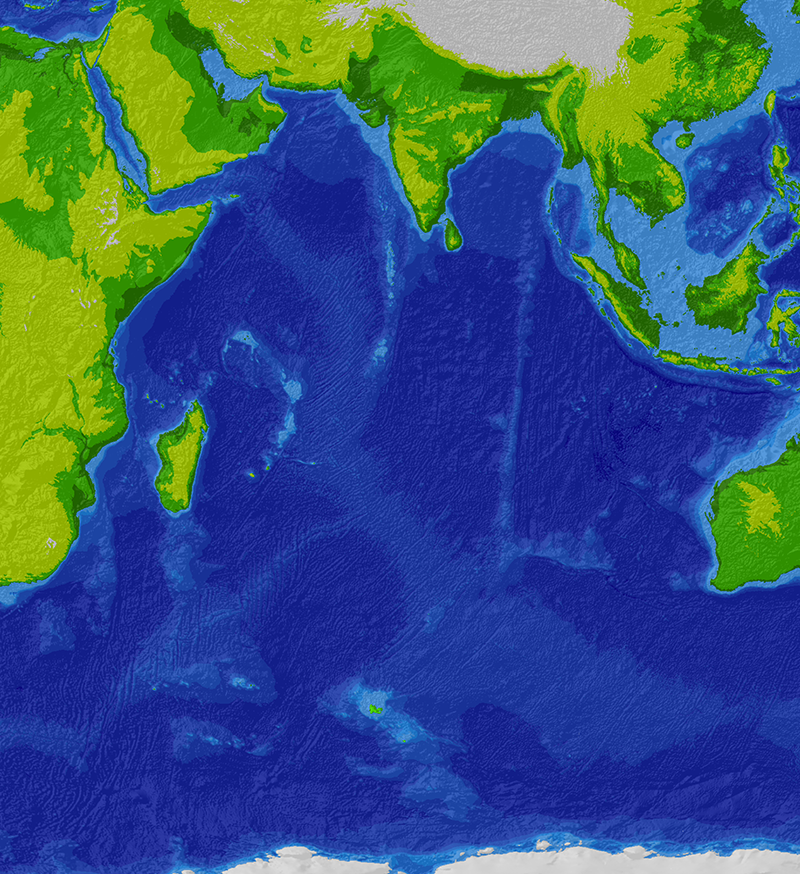
Relief of the Indian Ocean floor from satellite elevation data. The Chagos Archipelago lies on the Chagos–Laccadive Ridge, a volcanic ridge that continues northwards through the Maldives.

The archipelago sits on the Chagos–Laccadive Ridge, a volcanic ridge that extends northwards from Diego Garcia for nearly 2,500 nautical miles through the Maldives and Lakshadweep; carbonate reefs and atolls have grown on the shallow banks formed by its volcanic features. In a model proposed in 1981, the ridge is the track of a stationary hotspot now beneath Réunion (the Réunion hotspot), which earlier produced the Maldive and Laccadive islands, the Chagos Bank, the volcanic ridge beneath much of the Mascarene Plateau, and Mauritius, and whose first phase of activity probably coincided with the eruption of the Deccan Traps of western India. The Chagos Bank was formerly joined to the Mascarene Plateau at the northern margin of the Nazareth Bank, until sea-floor spreading on the Central Indian Ridge began to separate the two about 35 million years ago.

In June 1987 the Ocean Drilling Program drilled on the northern margin of the Chagos Bank from the JOIDES Resolution, reaching the volcanic basement at Site 713, in about 2,900 m of water, 106 m below the sea floor. The cores contained about 35 flows of olivine tholeiitic basalt interbedded with chalks and volcanic ash of early middle Eocene age, erupted under water but in much shallower water than today's. Argon–argon dating showed that volcanic activity there built up a shallow submarine edifice about 49.3 million years ago, and the ages from the sites drilled along the ridge became younger from north to south, a progression that the authors concluded "confirms the hotspot model".

Stoddart inferred that Diego Garcia is a typical mid-ocean atoll, with a reef limestone cap 1.5 km or more thick resting on a subsiding volcanic foundation. During the low sea level of the last glaciation, about 17,000 years ago, the Great Chagos Bank and other banks were probably dry land, but Stoddart considered that the plants and animals of Diego Garcia, other than deliberate introductions, had probably all reached it across the ocean during the Holocene. Uranium–thorium dating of fossil corals cemented to the reef flats of six islands in the northern atolls gave ages from about 830 to 5,190 years, which indicates that the reef platforms began to form after the Holocene high stand of sea level about 6,500 years ago.

=== Bathymetry and seafloor ===
Map of the Great Chagos Bank (top) and an east–west section across it (bottom), from James Dwight Dana's Corals and Coral Islands (1890)

The shallow banks fall steeply to oceanic depths of about 3,000 m, in places within 15 nautical miles of the coast, and the Chagos Trench, which runs north–south about 60 nautical miles east of the islands, descends to more than 5,000 m. The Great Chagos Bank is separated from the Maldive and Laccadive plateaux by a channel about 500 km wide, (Note: Stoddart gives the depth of this channel as 2,200–3,300 m; the shipboard scientists of the Ocean Drilling Program refer to "the 4500-m channel that separates the Chagos Bank from the Maldive Islands".) and soundings of 1–1.3 km separate it from Diego Garcia, Peros Banhos and the Salomon Islands.

In the boundary case between Mauritius and the Maldives, Mauritius described a linear depression to the south and east of the archipelago, the Chagos Trough, which it argued is interrupted by the Gardiner Seamounts and by an "elevated saddle", while the Maldives argued that the trough is "a clear break" in the submerged prolongation of the archipelago; in 2023 the special chamber of the International Tribunal for the Law of the Sea found "significant uncertainty" on the point. Beyond the banks, modelling cited by Sheppard and colleagues predicts 86 seamounts (conical rises of more than 1,000 m) and 243 smaller knolls within the 200-nautical-mile zone, more than 10 per cent of all the seamounts of the Indian Ocean.

The northern part of Diego Garcia's lagoon has been altered by dredging: an anchorage, a turning basin and an access channel 13.6 m deep were cut for the military facility, and Hamylton and East estimated from surveys of 1967 and 1998 that about 0.55 km^{3} of sediment had been removed from the north-western part of the lagoon, especially near Main Pass.

Although Stoddart described the Maldive and Chagos plateaux as notably aseismic, the area lies on a minor plate margin, and earthquake shocks are felt at times on Diego Garcia. On 30 November 1983 an earthquake of magnitude 7.3 occurred in the Chagos Archipelago region. According to the US Navy, of about 123 tremors recorded within 150 miles (240 km) of Diego Garcia since 1965, 69 occurred in the last month of 1983, 34 of them in the 24 hours from 30 November to 1 December. The earthquake damaged some buildings and piers on Diego Garcia and ruptured underground fuel lines; it also generated a tsunami, which caused a rise of about five feet (1.5 m) in wave height in the lagoon and wave damage near the south-eastern tip of the island, and was recorded at 40 centimetres (16 in) at Victoria in Seychelles.

=== Soils and freshwater lenses ===
The land sediments of Diego Garcia consist entirely of calcium carbonate, apart from fragments of pumice, and on the higher and older parts of the atoll a dark-brown peaty loam several inches deep has formed.

Some soils are rich in phosphate from the droppings of seabirds: P. O. Wiehe, who visited the islands in 1939, found the soil of Île du Coin and Île Boddam to consist of layers of sand, organic matter and old guano, and Gardiner reported phosphatised soil on Egmont. Guano was dug at the north-western end of Diego Garcia from the mid-1950s, and by 1957 it made up one-third of the atoll's exports, going to the sugar fields of Mauritius.

Beneath the islands lie lenses of fresh water sustained by the high rainfall. In 1770 the French officer La Fontaine reported that Diego Garcia was "not provided with fresh water", but shallow wells readily tap the lenses, which on Diego Garcia are thickest near the middle of the land rim and are recharged by an estimated quarter to a third of the rainfall. Since 1985 the atoll's drinking water has been pumped from many scattered wells, 102 of them in five production areas in the late 1990s, producing about 1 million US gallons (3,800 m^{3}) a day, with pumping rates adjusted to keep the chloride content acceptable. The lenses are vulnerable to the intrusion of salt water, and fuel from a leak discovered at the airfield in 1991 had to be diverted away from the production wells. Sheppard and colleagues warn that a breach of the shore could destroy the freshwater lens of the area affected.

== Oceanography ==
=== Currents and the thermocline ridge ===
The archipelago lies at the eastern margin of the Seychelles–Chagos thermocline ridge, along which the thermocline rises close to the surface and cold water upwells from below it. Vialard and colleagues describe the ridge as a year-round feature between 5° and 10°S, east of 50°E, produced by the pattern of surface winds; its surface water is nonetheless very warm, 28.5–30 °C for most of the austral summer, and the combination of a shallow thermocline and high temperatures makes it a region of strong air–sea interaction.

The ridge marks the boundary between the westward-flowing South Equatorial Current to its south and the eastward South Equatorial Countercurrent, strongest in boreal winter, to its north. According to Hamylton and East, these currents carry the larvae of marine species such as corals westwards towards Seychelles and eastwards towards Thailand and the Cocos (Keeling) Islands.

The region has the strongest intraseasonal variability of sea surface temperature in the Indo-Pacific warm pool, with cooling events of 1–1.5 °C lasting one to two months that are linked to the Madden–Julian oscillation. On interannual time scales it is affected by the El Niño–Southern Oscillation and by the Indian Ocean Dipole, one of whose two centres of action lies at the archipelago.

=== Tides, waves and lagoon exchange ===
Tides are semi-diurnal; records made at East Point on Diego Garcia in 1967 gave a maximum range of 1.6 m at spring tides and 0.7 m at neaps. Dunne, Barbosa and Woodworth found the seasonal cycle of mean sea level very weak, and its variation from year to year, of up to about 10 cm, partly influenced by the Indian Ocean Dipole.

The predominantly south-easterly winds cause marked differences in wave energy round the atolls, whose south-western, western and northern margins Perry and colleagues classed as sheltered and whose north-eastern, eastern and south-eastern margins they classed as exposed. Dunne and colleagues found no evidence of changes in the wind or wave environment in the previous 20 years.

== Climate ==
The archipelago's seasons are governed by the north–south migration of a zone of equatorial westerly winds separating the north-east and south-east trade winds. At Diego Garcia, winds are variable but mainly westerly from December to March; April and May are a transition; from June to September the south-east trades blow steadily; and October and November form a second transition. Winds of more than 40 knots are unusual. The mean temperature is about 27 °C throughout the year, and the relative humidity averages about 79 per cent.

Climate data for Diego Garcia (1951–1993)
Month	Jan	Feb	Mar	Apr	May	Jun	Jul	Aug	Sep	Oct	Nov	Dec	Year
Record high °C (°F)	33.9 (93.0)	33.9 (93.0)	35.0 (95.0)	35.0 (95.0)	32.9 (91.2)	35.0 (95.0)	32.2 (90.0)	32.2 (90.0)	32.2 (90.0)	32.0 (89.6)	32.7 (90.9)	33.3 (91.9)	35.0 (95.0)
Mean daily maximum °C (°F)	29.8 (85.6)	30.3 (86.5)	30.9 (87.6)	30.9 (87.6)	30.2 (86.4)	29.4 (84.9)	28.7 (83.7)	28.7 (83.7)	29.0 (84.2)	29.4 (84.9)	29.8 (85.6)	30.1 (86.2)	29.7 (85.5)
Daily mean °C (°F)	27.1 (80.8)	27.4 (81.3)	27.6 (81.7)	27.8 (82.0)	27.5 (81.5)	26.8 (80.2)	26.3 (79.3)	26.1 (79.0)	26.4 (79.5)	26.7 (80.1)	27.0 (80.6)	27.2 (81.0)	27.0 (80.6)
Mean daily minimum °C (°F)	24.7 (76.5)	25.0 (77.0)	25.4 (77.7)	25.7 (78.3)	25.4 (77.7)	24.7 (76.5)	24.2 (75.6)	24.1 (75.4)	24.2 (75.6)	24.3 (75.7)	24.7 (76.5)	24.8 (76.6)	24.8 (76.6)
Record low °C (°F)	21.1 (70.0)	21.1 (70.0)	20.0 (68.0)	21.1 (70.0)	19.4 (66.9)	20.6 (69.1)	20.6 (69.1)	20.0 (68.0)	21.1 (70.0)	18.9 (66.0)	21.4 (70.5)	18.3 (64.9)	18.3 (64.9)
Average precipitation mm (inches)	340 (13.4)	279 (11.0)	213 (8.4)	194 (7.6)	167 (6.6)	147 (5.8)	144 (5.7)	145 (5.7)	244 (9.6)	281 (11.1)	221 (8.7)	273 (10.7)	2,648 (104.3)
Average precipitation days (≥ 1.0 mm)	21	15	17	15	11	14	13	10	13	14	18	19	180
Average relative humidity (%)	80	79	78	77	79	79	79	79	80	79	79	78	79
Source: Deutscher Wetterdienst; periods: temperature extremes and precipitation 1951–1993, mean temperature 1954–1993, mean maximum and minimum temperature and humidity 1971–1993, precipitation days 1968–1981

Tropical Cyclone 11S south of Diego Garcia on 23 January 2003, imaged by the MODIS instrument on NASA's Aqua satellite

The Chagos are, according to Stoddart, the wettest coral islands in the Indian Ocean, with mean annual rainfall of more than 3,700 mm in places. Diego Garcia had a mean annual rainfall of 2,599 mm in 1937–38 and 1951–66, with annual totals ranging from 1,465 to 3,805 mm; rain is heaviest in January, February and October, and monthly falls average less than 200 mm only from April to August, during the trades. Peros Banhos, in the north, averaged 3,999 mm over 14 years of record, and rainfall increases northwards, with a gradient of about 6 mm per kilometre between Diego Garcia and the Salomon Islands, 220 km apart; the higher rainfall of the north is also less reliable. Rain falls on most days, often as a short shower, but droughts sometimes last a month.

=== Tropical cyclones and tsunamis ===
Because of the low latitude, tropical cyclones are rare, although fresh westerly winds may blow when cyclones form or pass to the south; according to the Mauritius meteorological service, a cyclone of moderate strength passed just south of Diego Garcia on 16–17 September 1944 and destroyed two Catalina flying boats. The US Navy notes that cyclones seldom pass close to Diego Garcia, because many form near the island and then move away.

The Indian Ocean tsunami of 26 December 2004 weakened as it travelled south along the Chagos–Laccadive Ridge, and the tide gauge at Diego Garcia recorded an amplitude of 60 cm. The United States Navy reported no impact on its facilities or personnel, only minor debris and beach erosion elsewhere on the island, and attributed this mainly to favourable ocean topography, including the depth of the nearby Chagos Trench. The navy's natural resources plan describes the effect as a high tidal surge of about 6 feet (1.8 m).

== Sea-level rise and coastal change ==
West Island, part of the Diego Garcia group, in 2005

All the islands are low-lying coral cays of limestone. The land on Diego Garcia is generally 1–1.5 m high, and the highest islet in Peros Banhos rises only 3.7 m. The highest ground is on the island rims, and on Diego Garcia the seaward dunes reach about 7–9 m. Several islands have a central depression, and much of the eastern arm of Diego Garcia is so narrow and low that it floods extensively at high spring tides.

=== Sea level ===
Tide gauges on Diego Garcia have recorded sea level since 1988, in two series with gaps. Sheppard put the rise at a little over 5 mm a year in 2007, and Sheppard and colleagues wrote in 2012 that the gauges show a substantial rise, although satellite altimetry indicates a much smaller one. Dunne, Barbosa and Woodworth, analysing the gauge records for 1988–2000 and 2003–2011, found no statistically significant long-term rise, and altimeter rates of 0.16–4.56 mm a year in the surrounding seas; they also found that Diego Garcia had risen slightly, by 0.63 ± 0.28 mm a year between 1996 and 2009, and concluded that the archipelago had been "a relatively stable physical environment", while noting that future sea-level rise remained an important question. Sheppard and colleagues regard erosion of the shores and inundation by the sea, rather than sea-level rise as such, as the immediate concern.

=== Erosion and accretion ===
Many shorelines eroded considerably in the 2000s, in parts of the northern atolls by more than 1 m a year, although episodically and patchily, and remnants of mature coconut palms and old cultivation pits now lie in the intertidal zone. Sheppard and colleagues note that the supply of sediment to the shores is likely to have changed markedly after the mass coral mortality caused by warming in 1998.

On Diego Garcia, comparing Stoddart's map of 1967 with satellite images of 2005, Hamylton and East found that 26 of 69 transects across the rim had eroded and 43 had accreted, much of the accretion being the building out of the lagoon shore for the airbase, which they estimated had added 3.01 km^{2} of land. Sheppard challenged these findings in 2014, arguing that Stoddart's map was too small in scale and that the canopy of hardwoods that had replaced coconut palms could add tens of metres to a shoreline measured by the edge of vegetation; he pointed to increasing inundation of the low south-east of the atoll and to the cost, reaching $10 million a year, of hardening parts of the shoreline of the base, which suggested "emerging problems everywhere rather than accretion and stability of land". Hamylton and East replied that most of their accreting transects lay outside the additional margin of error, that inundation is not in itself evidence of erosion, and that it was "an oversimplification" to describe the rim as either expanding or eroding.

A study by Purkis, Gardiner and Johnston of images from 1963 to 2013 found that, outside the military precinct, the land area of Diego Garcia had fallen by only 0.92 per cent, although 12 per cent of that shoreline had advanced and 15 per cent retreated, the lagoon shores changing most; the north-eastern limb had generally retreated, while the south-eastern limb and the south of the island had extended. The authors expected human modification and sea-level rise to make the coast, which they called "naturally dynamic", more so in the future.

=== Reef growth ===
A survey of 28 reefs in 2015 found that reefs dominated by Acropora corals had recovered a potential vertical growth rate of about 4.2 mm a year, close to the rise projected for the central Indian Ocean in 2081–2100 under the IPCC's RCP4.5 scenario. After the bleaching of 2015–2016, coral cover at twelve of the surveyed sites fell by 69 per cent and coral carbonate production by 77 per cent, and Lange and Perry warned that the loss of Acropora was likely to affect the reefs' capacity to keep up with projected sea-level rise.

== Natural hazards ==
According to the World Factbook, the territory has no natural hazards, lying outside the routes of Indian Ocean cyclones. The main physical risks are the erosion of shores and flooding by the sea: high tides regularly inundate parts of Diego Garcia, and a resettlement feasibility study of 2002 estimated the levels that severe storm overtopping could reach on Île du Coin and Île Boddam. Earthquakes are felt from time to time, and that of 1983 caused damage and a small tsunami.

== Maritime zones ==
The United Kingdom established a 12-nautical-mile fisheries zone in 1969. On 1 October 1991 the BIOT Commissioner proclaimed a 200-nautical-mile Fisheries Conservation and Management Zone, and on 17 September 2003 an Environment (Protection and Preservation) Zone with the same extent, whose coordinates were deposited with the Secretary-General of the United Nations in 2004. The United Kingdom told Mauritius, which protested, that these zones were not a full exclusive economic zone for all purposes. In 2010 the whole zone except Diego Garcia was declared a marine protected area extending 200 nautical miles from the archipelago's baselines.

Mauritius, which regards the archipelago as part of its territory, declared a 200-nautical-mile exclusive economic zone in its Maritime Zones Act of 1977, reaffirmed in 2005. It says that it drew archipelagic baselines around the Chagos Archipelago, including base points on Blenheim Reef, and deposited them with the Secretary-General on 26 July 2006. In 2023 a special chamber of the International Tribunal for the Law of the Sea, in a case between Mauritius and the Maldives to which the United Kingdom was not a party, drew a single maritime boundary between the archipelago and the Maldives within 200 nautical miles. It declined to use Blenheim Reef for base points, giving the reef half effect as a relevant circumstance, and declined to delimit the continental shelf beyond 200 nautical miles because of "significant uncertainty" about Mauritius's entitlement there.

Mauritius submitted preliminary information on an extended continental shelf to the Commission on the Limits of the Continental Shelf in 2009, and made partial submissions for the "Southern Chagos Archipelago region" in 2019 and the "Northern Chagos Archipelago region" in 2022; the United Kingdom told the commission that it did not consent to its considering the southern submission. The treaty signed by the United Kingdom and Mauritius in 2025, which had not entered into force by October 2026, defines the archipelago as including its internal waters, territorial sea, archipelagic waters and exclusive economic zone, without prejudice to Mauritius's claims to the continental shelf, and defines Diego Garcia as the island and a 12-nautical-mile zone around it.

== Human geography ==
=== Historical settlements ===
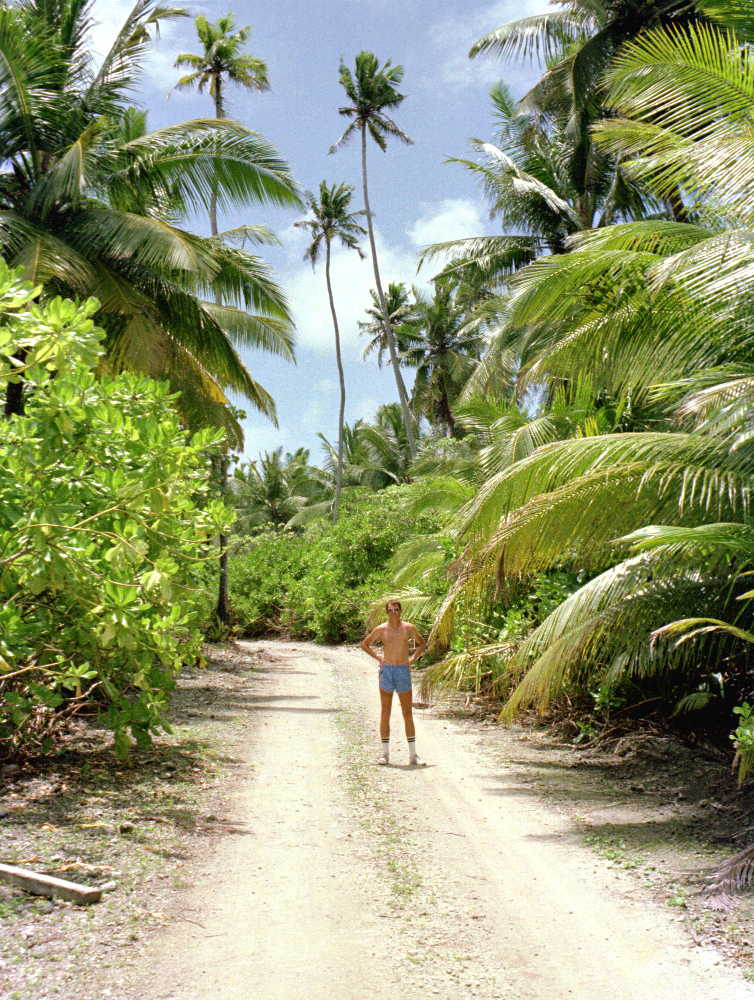
The road to the former plantation on the eastern side of Diego Garcia, 1982

Coconut plantations were established on Diego Garcia, Peros Banhos and the Salomon Islands, and also on Eagle Island, the Three Brothers and the Egmont group. As production was concentrated, the outlying islands were abandoned: the Three Brothers in the 1850s, and Eagle Island and the Egmont Islands in the 1930s. Eagle Island had as many as 100 inhabitants, and the Salomon Islands had a timber industry and were known for their boatbuilding. Île du Coin now has an abandoned church, graves and derelict buildings.

On Diego Garcia three estates – East Point, Pointe Marianne and Minni Minni – produced coconut oil in the 1860s, when the large manager's house and other plantation buildings were built at East Point; they were amalgamated in 1883. Coaling stations for steamships operated at East Point and on Middle and East Islands for a few years from 1882. By the turn of the century there were six villages on Diego Garcia, with a hospital on each arm of the atoll. East Point, where a chapel was added in 1895 and later a church and a jetty with a light railway, became the main commercial centre; the buildings at Minni Minni, Middle Island and East Island were abandoned, and Pointe Marianne became an outstation of East Point, where all processing was done.

The plantation village at East Point survives within the controlled area of the eastern arm, with the restored manager's house and chapel, the jail, store, hospital, copra mills and drying sheds round the old plantation square, a cemetery nearby, and the wreck of a Second World War Catalina flying boat on the shore. The US Navy regards the remains of the Pointe Marianne plantation and its cemetery as historically significant.

=== Population before 1973 ===
The population of the archipelago was about 760 in 1880 and approached 1,000 by 1900. Diego Garcia had 334 inhabitants in 1851 and 554 in 1861, and 680 when the Governor of Mauritius, Sir Robert Scott, visited in October 1955. A survey in 1964 counted 483 people on Diego Garcia (172 Mauritians and 311 Seychellois), 291 on Peros Banhos and 219 in the Salomon Islands, 993 in all. Between July and October 1971 Diego Garcia was evacuated, some of its people being moved to Peros Banhos and the Salomon Islands; the Salomon Islands were closed by November 1972, and the last of the population left Peros Banhos on 26 May 1973.

=== Diego Garcia today ===
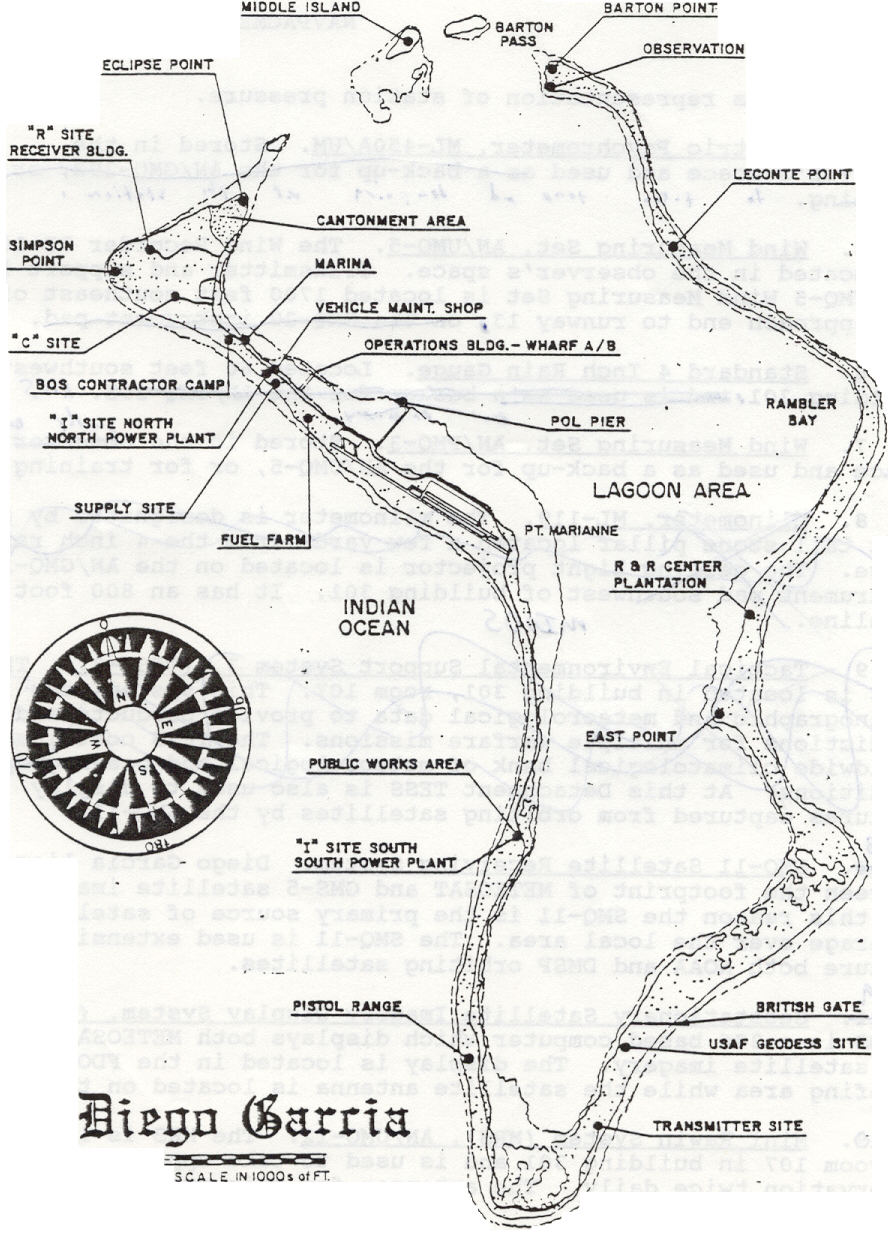
Map of Diego Garcia from the US Navy's Local Area Forecaster's Handbook for Diego Garcia, about 2002

The western arm of Diego Garcia is occupied by the military facility, which is supplied entirely from outside the archipelago. According to the BIOT Administration, around 2,000 people are ordinarily present, mostly British and American military personnel, officials of the administration and civilian contractors; the US Navy put the island's population at about 3,650 in 2005. The main built-up area, known as "Downtown", lies at the north-western tip of the atoll, with the quarters of the military personnel, the headquarters, shops, a swimming pool and other facilities of a small town. The US Navy calls this the cantonment; housing for contractors lies directly to its south, and a camp of 190 tent pads for deployed air force personnel, Camp Justice, was built in 1990 at Pointe Marianne.

The base was laid out in the 1970s round two antenna farms about 27 km apart, with the cantonment near the receiver site in the north and the airfield, whose runway is 3,700 metres (12,100 ft) long, between them. Ships enter the lagoon through a dredged channel between Spur Reef and West Island and berth at a deep-draft wharf about 2 nautical miles south-south-east of Eclipse Point and at a fuel and supply pier beyond it.

=== Land use ===
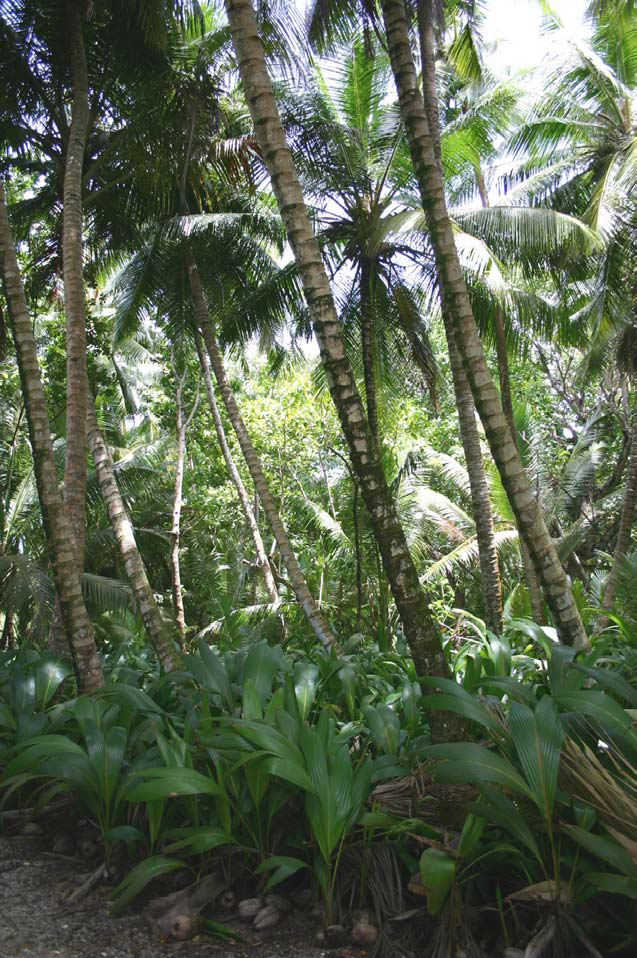
Cocos bon Dieu, dense coconut forest, on Diego Garcia, 2005

In the plantation era most of the larger islands were planted with coconuts at the expense of the native vegetation. Stoddart calculated from the oil output of 1864 that almost the whole of Diego Garcia, 6,250 of its 7,488 acres, was then cropped for coconuts, and the survey of 1964 recorded some 6,000 acres of coconut plantations there. Comparing maps of 1967 and 2005, Hamylton and East found a marked shift from Cocos Bon-Dieu, a mixture of shrubs and young trees, to broadleaf woodland, although some of the change might reflect differences in mapping methods.

The naval facility occupied about 809 hectares (2,000 acres) of land in 1997. Land was reclaimed to extend the airfield, its parking apron and the wharf, coral was dredged from a 6.4-kilometre (4.0 mi) stretch of seaward reef from 1971 for construction aggregate, and an estimated 30.8 km^{2} of lagoon and 0.5 km^{2} of reef flat were dredged. The rest of the atoll is largely protected: the Diego Garcia Ramsar site of 35,424 ha, designated on 4 July 2001, excludes the area set aside for military use under the agreement of 1976 between the United Kingdom and the United States; the northern part of the eastern arm and the three islets in the lagoon mouth are strict nature reserves; and entry to the atoll's environmentally sensitive areas requires a permit under a restricted-area ordinance of 1994. There is no US Navy development on the eastern side of the atoll.

The territory has no permanent inhabitants, and apart from the camp on Île du Coin the outer islands have been uninhabited since the early 1970s. According to the BIOT Administration, ten Important Bird Areas, covering about 15 per cent of the archipelago's land area, are also designated as strict nature reserves, which no one may enter without the written permission of the BIOT Administration. Visiting yachts, the main users of the outer islands, may moor with a permit only at designated sites off Île Boddam, and between Île Takamaka and Île Fouquet, in the Salomon Islands, and off Île Diamant, Île du Coin and Île Fouquet in Peros Banhos.

=== Île du Coin since 2026 ===
Since February 2026 a small group of Chagossians has lived without permits on Île du Coin, in Peros Banhos: four landed on 16 February and two more went ashore on 26 February, and six Chagossians were living on the island in September 2026.

== Natural resources ==
From the 18th century until the 1970s the only economic activity of significance was the coconut plantations, which produced coconut oil and copra. The islands also produced honey, guano, timber, wooden boats, pigs, salt fish and maize, and in 1967 Diego Garcia produced 707 tons of copra, half the territory's total. Until 2010 licensed fisheries, mainly for tuna, provided most of the territory's income; licences brought in £564,431 in the financial year 2003–04, and the last ones expired on 31 October 2010, after the creation of the protected area.

In December 1965 a reply to a parliamentary question in Mauritius, given on behalf of the Premier, stated that "there has never been any indication of minerals in the Chagos Archipelago, which is a string of coral atolls". Under the understanding reached at the time of the detachment, the benefit of any minerals or oil found in or near the archipelago is to revert to Mauritius, and the United Kingdom has repeatedly said that it will not permit prospecting for minerals or oil while the territory remains British.

== Ecology ==
According to the BIOT Administration, the territory has the greatest marine biodiversity in the United Kingdom and its overseas territories. In 2012 Sheppard and colleagues estimated that the archipelago held between a quarter and a half of the Indian Ocean's reef area remaining in excellent condition. Eighteen species of seabird breed on the islands, five of them in internationally important numbers. The native flora is poor, with about 45 species of higher plants, and on the larger islands the plantations largely destroyed the native vegetation and the colonies of birds, turtles and coconut crabs. Diego Garcia was designated a Ramsar site in 2001, and in 2010 the waters around the archipelago, except Diego Garcia, became a marine protected area.

== Islands ==
The dataset of Sheppard and Topp, which accompanies botanical records made between 1971 and 1998, lists 59 islands: five in Diego Garcia, 31 in Peros Banhos, ten in the Salomon Islands, eight on the Great Chagos Bank and five in the Egmont group. Diego Garcia, with 2,719 ha, is about ten times larger than any other island; the next largest are Eagle Island (234 ha), Lubine (177 ha), Île Pierre and Soudest (150 ha each), Île du Coin (127 ha), Île Boddam (108.5 ha) and Île Poule (108 ha), while many islets cover 2 ha or less.

== See also ==
- Chagos Archipelago
- History of the Chagos Archipelago
- Ecology of the Chagos Archipelago
- List of islands in the Chagos Archipelago
- Chagos Marine Protected Area
- Geography of Mauritius
- Geography of the Maldives

== Sources ==
=== Court and tribunal decisions ===
- In the Matter of the Chagos Marine Protected Area Arbitration (Mauritius v. United Kingdom): Award (PDF). Permanent Court of Arbitration. 18 March 2015.
- Memorial of the Republic of Mauritius. Vol. I. Permanent Court of Arbitration. 1 August 2012.
- Counter-Memorial of the United Kingdom. Permanent Court of Arbitration. 15 July 2013.
- Dispute concerning delimitation of the maritime boundary between Mauritius and Maldives in the Indian Ocean (Mauritius/Maldives), Judgment (PDF). International Tribunal for the Law of the Sea. 28 April 2023.
- Dispute concerning delimitation of the maritime boundary between Mauritius and Maldives in the Indian Ocean (Mauritius/Maldives), Preliminary Objections, Judgment (PDF). ITLOS Reports 2020–2021. International Tribunal for the Law of the Sea. 28 January 2021. p. 17.
- Legal Consequences of the Separation of the Chagos Archipelago from Mauritius in 1965, Advisory Opinion (PDF). I.C.J. Reports 2019. International Court of Justice. 25 February 2019. p. 95.
- Chagos Islanders v Attorney General and HM BIOT Commissioner, EWHC (QB) 2222 (High Court 9 October 2003).
- R (Mandarin and others) v HM Commissioner for the British Indian Ocean Territory (Supreme Court of the British Indian Ocean Territory 31 March 2026), Text.

=== United Nations documents ===
- "Submission by the Republic of Mauritius concerning the Southern Chagos Archipelago region". Commission on the Limits of the Continental Shelf. United Nations Division for Ocean Affairs and the Law of the Sea.
- "Submission by the Republic of Mauritius concerning the Northern Chagos Archipelago region". Commission on the Limits of the Continental Shelf. United Nations Division for Ocean Affairs and the Law of the Sea.
- Permanent Mission of the United Kingdom to the United Nations (28 June 2019). Note No. 147/19 to the Secretary-General concerning the submission of Mauritius to the Commission on the Limits of the Continental Shelf (PDF) (Report). United Nations.

=== Treaties and official documents ===
- Agreement between the Government of the United Kingdom of Great Britain and Northern Ireland and the Government of the Republic of Mauritius concerning the Chagos Archipelago including Diego Garcia (CS Mauritius No.1/2025, CP 1334) (Report). Foreign, Commonwealth and Development Office. 22 May 2025.
- "About". British Indian Ocean Territory Administration.
- "Environment". British Indian Ocean Territory Administration.
- "Mooring Site Plots". British Indian Ocean Territory Administration.
- "Terrestrial Protected Areas". British Indian Ocean Territory Administration.
- Rammell, Bill (21 June 2004). "British Indian Ocean Territories (written answer 179698)". Hansard, House of Commons. col. 1219W. Archived from the original on 13 May 2006.
- "Diego Garcia Military Base and British Indian Ocean Territory Bill". Hansard, House of Lords. 13 October 2026.
- National Geospatial-Intelligence Agency (2026). Sailing Directions (Enroute): East Africa and the South Indian Ocean (PDF). Pub. 171 (15th ed.). Springfield, Virginia: National Geospatial-Intelligence Agency.
- "Klimatafel von Diego Garcia, Chagos-Archipel / Indischer Ozean / Großbritannien" [Climate table of Diego Garcia, Chagos Archipelago, Indian Ocean, United Kingdom] (PDF) (in German). Deutscher Wetterdienst.
- National Geophysical Data Center. "Tsunami event: 30 November 1983, Chagos Archipelago region". Global Historical Tsunami Database. National Centers for Environmental Information. doi:10.7289/V5PN93H7.
- Newton, Robert (1964). Report on the Anglo-American Survey in the Indian Ocean (PDF) (Report). TNA CO 1036/1332 – via Memorial of Mauritius, Annex 2.
- Diego Garcia Integrated Natural Resources Management Plan (Report). U.S. Navy Support Facility Diego Garcia; Naval Facilities Engineering Command, Pacific. September 2005. Archived from the original on 7 February 2026.
- "Diego Garcia". Ramsar Sites Information Service. Secretariat of the Convention on Wetlands.
- Sheppard, Charles; Carr, Peter; Graham, Nicholas; et al. (July 2012). Conservation and Management in British Indian Ocean Territory (Chagos Archipelago) (PDF) (Report). Archived from the original (PDF) on 2 November 2012.
- Torikai, Jill D. (1998). Status of ground-water resources at U.S. Navy Support Facility, Diego Garcia: summary of hydrologic and climatic data, January 1995 through September 1997 (PDF) (Report). Open-File Report. Honolulu: United States Geological Survey. doi:10.3133/ofr981.
- "M 7.3 – Chagos Archipelago region, 30 November 1983". Earthquake Hazards Program. United States Geological Survey.
- "British Indian Ocean Territory". The World Factbook. Central Intelligence Agency. Archived from the original on 2 December 2025.

=== Books and journals ===
- Bourne, W. R. P. (1971). "The birds of the Chagos Group, Indian Ocean". Atoll Research Bulletin (149). Smithsonian Institution: 175–207.
- Dullo, W.; Heiss, G.; Sheppard, Charles; Eisenhauer, A. (n.d.). "Estimates of reef and island age for the Chagos islands based on isotopic dating of fossil corals". Chagos Information Portal (Dataset). Chagos Conservation Trust.
- Dumbraveanu, D.; Sheppard, Charles (n.d.). "Substrate area estimates at different depths for the Chagos Archipelago". Chagos Information Portal (Dataset). Chagos Conservation Trust.
- Duncan, R. A.; Hargraves, R. B. (1990). "^{40}Ar/^{39}Ar geochronology of basement rocks from the Mascarene Plateau, the Chagos Bank, and the Maldives Ridge" (PDF). In Duncan, R. A.; Backman, J.; Peterson, L. C.; et al. (eds.). Proceedings of the Ocean Drilling Program, Scientific Results. Vol. 115. College Station, Texas: Ocean Drilling Program. pp. 43–51. doi:10.2973/odp.proc.sr.115.141.1990.
- Dunne, Richard P.; Barbosa, Susana M.; Woodworth, Philip L. (February 2012). "Contemporary sea level in the Chagos Archipelago, central Indian Ocean". Global and Planetary Change. 82–83: 25–37. Bibcode:2012GPC....82...25D. doi:10.1016/j.gloplacha.2011.11.009.
- Edis, Richard (1993). Peak of Limuria: The Story of Diego Garcia (PDF). London: Bellew Publishing. ISBN 1-85725-070-2 – via Written Statement of the Republic of Mauritius (ICJ), vol. IV, Annex 136 (extracts).
- Hamylton, Sarah; East, Holly (November 2012). "A geospatial appraisal of ecological and geomorphic change on Diego Garcia Atoll, Chagos Islands (British Indian Ocean Territory)". Remote Sensing. 4 (11): 3444–3461. Bibcode:2012RemS....4.3444H. doi:10.3390/rs4113444.
- Hamylton, Sarah; East, Holly (19 March 2014). "Response to Sheppard, C. Atoll rim expansion or erosion in Diego Garcia Atoll, Indian Ocean? Comment on Hamylton, S.; East, H. A geospatial appraisal of ecological and geomorphic change on Diego Garcia Atoll, Chagos Islands (British Indian Ocean Territory). Remote Sens. 2012, 4, 3444–3461". Remote Sensing. 6 (3): 2468–2472. Bibcode:2014RemS....6.2468H. doi:10.3390/rs6032468.
- Lange, Ines D.; Perry, Chris T. (August 2019). "Bleaching impacts on carbonate production in the Chagos Archipelago: influence of functional coral groups on carbonate budget trajectories". Coral Reefs. 38 (4): 619–624. Bibcode:2019CorRe..38..619L. doi:10.1007/s00338-019-01784-x. hdl:10871/36110.
- Nagarajan, B.; Suresh, I.; Sundar, D.; Sharma, R.; et al. (2006). "The Great Tsunami of 26 December 2004: a description based on tide-gauge data from the Indian subcontinent and surrounding areas". Earth, Planets and Space. 58 (2): 211–215. Bibcode:2006EP&S...58..211N. doi:10.1186/BF03353380.
- Perry, Chris T.; Murphy, Gary N.; Graham, Nicholas A. J.; Wilson, Shaun K.; Januchowski-Hartley, Fraser A.; East, Holly K. (16 December 2015). "Remote coral reefs can sustain high growth potential and may match future sea-level trends". Scientific Reports. 5 18289. Bibcode:2015NatSR...518289P. doi:10.1038/srep18289. PMC 4680928. PMID 26669758.
- Purkis, Samuel J.; Gardiner, Rob; Johnston, Matthew (15 May 2016). "A half-century of coastline change in Diego Garcia – the largest atoll island in the Chagos". Geomorphology. 261: 282–298. Bibcode:2016Geomo.261..282P. doi:10.1016/j.geomorph.2016.03.010.
- Sheppard, C. R. C.; et al. (March 2012). "Reefs and islands of the Chagos Archipelago, Indian Ocean: why it is the world's largest no-take marine protected area". Aquatic Conservation: Marine and Freshwater Ecosystems. 22 (2): 232–261. Bibcode:2012ACMFE..22..232S. doi:10.1002/aqc.1248. PMC 4260629. PMID 25505830.
- Sheppard, Charles (30 May 2007). "Sea level change and shore erosion" (PDF). Factsheet 040. Chagos Conservation Trust.
- Sheppard, Charles (19 March 2014). "Atoll rim expansion or erosion in Diego Garcia Atoll, Indian Ocean? Comment on Hamylton, S.; East, H. A geospatial appraisal of ecological and geomorphic change on Diego Garcia Atoll, Chagos Islands (British Indian Ocean Territory). Remote Sens. 2012, 4, 3444–3461". Remote Sensing. 6 (3): 2463–2467. Bibcode:2014RemS....6.2463S. doi:10.3390/rs6032463.
- Sheppard, Charles; Topp, John (n.d.). "Plant distribution across 59 islands in Chagos over 21 years". Chagos Information Portal (Dataset). Chagos Conservation Trust.
- Shipboard Scientific Party (1988). "Sites 712 and 713" (PDF). In Backman, J.; Duncan, R. A.; et al. (eds.). Proceedings of the Ocean Drilling Program, Initial Reports. Vol. 115. College Station, Texas: Ocean Drilling Program. pp. 733–845. doi:10.2973/odp.proc.ir.115.111.1988.
- Stoddart, D. R. (1971). "Settlement and development of Diego Garcia". Atoll Research Bulletin (149). Smithsonian Institution: 209–217.
- Stoddart, D. R. (1971a). "Scientific studies at Diego Garcia Atoll". Atoll Research Bulletin (149). Smithsonian Institution: 1–6. doi:10.5479/si.00775630.147.1.
- Stoddart, D. R. (1971b). "Geomorphology of Diego Garcia Atoll". Atoll Research Bulletin (149). Smithsonian Institution: 7–26.
- Stoddart, D. R. (1971c). "Diego Garcia climate and marine environment". Atoll Research Bulletin (149). Smithsonian Institution: 27–30.
- Vialard, J.; Duvel, J. P.; McPhaden, M. J.; Bouruet-Aubertot, P.; et al. (January 2009). "Cirene: air–sea interactions in the Seychelles–Chagos thermocline ridge region". Bulletin of the American Meteorological Society. 90 (1): 45–61. Bibcode:2009BAMS...90...45V. doi:10.1175/2008BAMS2499.1.
- Vine, David (2009). Island of Shame: The Secret History of the U.S. Military Base on Diego Garcia (PDF). Princeton University Press. ISBN 978-0-691-13869-5 – via Written Statement of the Republic of Mauritius (ICJ), vol. V, Annex 151 (extracts).

=== News and other sources ===
- Arjanee, Ameerah (2 October 2026). "UK-Mauritius Chagos sovereignty deal stalls amid fears of further delays". Al Jazeera English.
- Badshah, Nadeem (17 February 2026). "Four Chagossians return to islands in attempt to stop British transfer to Mauritius". The Guardian.
- Foster, Scott; Windrem, Robert (4 January 2005). "Tsunami spares U.S. base in Diego Garcia". NBC News.
- "Chagos : la revendication maldivienne ouvre un nouveau front diplomatique". Le Mauricien (in French). 14 September 2026.
- Peerthum, Satyendra (16 October 2018). "The Story of the Settlement of Diego Garcia and the Chagos Archipelago". Le Mauricien.
