= Liseby Elysé =

Mauritian activist (born 1953)

Liseby Elysé MSK
- Born: Marie Liseby Bertrand; 24 July 1953 (age 73); Peros Banhos, British Mauritius
- Citizenship: Mauritian
- Organization: Chagos Refugees Group

Liseby Elysé MSK (née Bertrand; born 24 July 1953) is a Mauritian activist of Chagossian origin. She is known for her testimony before the International Court of Justice in 2019 in the case between Mauritius and the United Kingdom concerning sovereignty over the Chagos Archipelago.

== Biography ==
=== Youth in the Chagos Islands and life in Mauritius ===
Liseby Bertrand was born on 24 July 1953 on Île du Coin, the most densely populated island of the Peros Banhos atoll, in the Chagos archipelago. At the time, the Chagos Islands were under British sovereignty and administered from the colony of Mauritius.

Like most Chagossians, she is a descendant of slaves brought to Chagos from the African coast. Her father, Charles Bertrand, was born in 1917 on the atoll of Six Îles, further south in the archipelago. He worked as a baker for the company that ran the coconut plantations. Her mother, Marcelle Antalika, born in the 1930s on Île du Coin, was working at the preparation of copra (the dried flesh of the coconut) for the plantation, but died when Liseby was seven years old. Liseby has five brothers and one sister. Her grandparents were also born in Chagos. The Bertrand family are practising Catholics and speak Chagossian Creole, which is close to Mauritian Creole. In 1972, she married France Elysé in Peros Banhos.

She only attended school for a few years, as the British administration closed the school when Liseby was nine. She never learned to read or write. In the Chagos Islands, she first worked as a nanny for the children of the archipelago's administrator.

On 27 April 1973, she was forcibly expelled from the Chagos Islands by the British administration to Mauritius, at the same time as the four hundred inhabitants of Peros Banhos, the last in the entire archipelago. At the time, she was pregnant with her first child. She recalls:

"We were told to leave everything behind. We weren't allowed to take our dogs. We were only allowed one suitcase per person, which we filled with everything that meant the most to us."

The conditions on the boat were miserable, and Liseby suffered a miscarriage shortly after arrival. According to her, this was due to the trauma and sorrow of the journey.

In Mauritius, the Chagossians were settled by the Mauritian government in empty buildings on the outskirts of Port Louis, originally without doors or windows. Liseby then worked as a shopkeeper and later as a domestic. She has six children.

Between 1978 and 1984, Liseby Elysé received 57,500 rupees from the British government as compensation, the equivalent of just under £4,000 at the time. This money was paid in exchange for signing a document that renounced any claim against the UK government following the deportation from the Chagos. Like many Chagossians, unable to read or write, Liseby signed with her thumbprint, without understanding the real significance of the document. In 2006, she took part in the first visit to the Chagos organised by the British authorities, and spent a few hours at Peros Banhos.

=== Activist for the Chagossian cause ===
She became involved with the Chagos Refugees Group, one of the organisations representing the Chagossian people, during these visits to the Chagos.

In 2018, as Mauritius took the United Kingdom to the International Court of Justice regarding sovereignty over the Chagos Islands, Liseby Elysé was one of five Chagossians to testify in writing about her history, at the request of the Mauritian side. Among them, Liseby Elysé was chosen to testify orally before the court. However, as she was unable to read out a text written in advance, she did so by means of a pre-recorded video, but was nevertheless present at the hearing in The Hague in September 2018, as part of the Mauritian delegation. On 25 February 2019, the Court handed down its decision in its advisory opinion, recognising on the one hand the forced expulsion of the Chagossians, and on the other hand requiring the end of British administration of the Chagos Islands in order to achieve decolonization. On 22 May 2019, the United Nations General Assembly took up this advisory opinion and put to the vote a resolution calling for the return of Mauritian sovereignty over the Chagos Islands and the resettlement of the Chagossians in their archipelago. The resolution was adopted by 116 votes to 6, but has never been implemented by the United Kingdom since.

In February 2022, Liseby took part, along with four other Chagossians, in a new journey to the northern atolls of the Chagos, Peros Banhos, Salomon and Blenheim Reef, but organised for the first time by the Mauritian authorities. The expedition, which included the presence of scientists, was intended to demarcate the maritime boundary between Mauritius and the Maldives, as well as disembarking at Peros Banhos and Salomon and planting a Mauritian flag there.

She is the central character in Philippe Sands' book The Last Colony, published in summer 2022. The writer and international lawyer, who was involved in the Mauritian delegation, tells the story of the Chagossians' struggle all the way to the International Court of Justice, through the life of Liseby Elysé.

== Recognition ==
In March 2019, Liseby Elysé was appointed a Member of the Order of the Star and Key of the Indian Ocean (MSK) of the Republic of Mauritius following her testimony before the International Court of Justice. At the end of 2022, on International Human Rights Day, she was made an honorary citizen of the city of Lyon. In 2023, she was nominated for the Nobel Peace Prize, along with Olivier Bancoult, President of the Chagos Refugees Group.
