= Pitt Bank =

Coordinates: 07°04′S 71°21′E

Location of Pitt Bank in the Indian Ocean

Pitt Bank is a wholly submerged atoll structure in the Southwest of the Chagos Archipelago. It is almost 56 km long Northwest to Southeast, with a width between 20 and 30 km. It stretches from 06°48'S to 07°16'S and 071°06'E to 071°36'E. The total size is 1317 km, making it the second largest ocean bank in the archipelago, after the Great Chagos Bank, and before Speakers Bank. The nearest land is Île Lubine of Egmont Atoll, located 22 km northeast off the northern end of Pitt Bank. The least depth is 7 metres at the Southeastern rim, and the deepest areas of the former lagoon reach 44 metres.

The much smaller Wight Bank is located 6 km to the SE off the southeastern tip of Pitt Bank.

This submerged atoll was named after William Pitt the Younger, who was a British prime minister in 1783–1801 and 1804–1806.

A buoy, marked by a radar reflector, is moored on the NW side of the bank.
