= Owen Bank =

Submerged atoll of the Chagos Archipelago

Coordinates: 06°48′S 70°14′E

Location of Owen Bank in the Indian Ocean

Owen Bank is a wholly submerged atoll structure in the Chagos Archipelago, Indian Ocean. The reported location is 06°47'S, 070°14'E to 06°48'S, 070°15'E, thus the bank is the westernmost feature of the Chagos group. The closest islands are Danger Island on the Great Chagos Bank, and Île Sipaille in the Egmont Atoll, both located about 120 km (75 mi) East-North-East of Owen Bank.

This geographic feature is not mentioned in the current Indian Ocean Pilot, but it appears in the British Admiralty nautical charts.
