= Wight Bank =

Atoll in the Indian Ocean

Location of Wight Bank in the Indian Ocean

Wight Bank is a small, wholly submerged atoll structure in the Southwest of the Chagos Archipelago, Indian Ocean. It is located 6 kilometres (3.7 miles) to the SE off the southeastern tip of Pitt Bank at 7°25′S 71°32′E. It is less than 2 km (1.2 miles) in diameter, and its total area is about 3 square kilometres (1.2 square miles). The closest piece of land is Île Sudest of Egmont Atoll, at 80 km (50 mi) NNW. Diego Garcia is 94 km (58 mi) to the east. The least charted depth is 8.5 km (5.3 mi).

Wight Bank was first reported in 1886.
