= Centurion Bank =

Atoll in the Indian Ocean

Coordinates: 07°39′S 70°50′E

Location of Centurion Bank in the Indian Ocean

Centurion Bank is a wholly submerged atoll structure in the Southwest of the Chagos Archipelago. It is about almost 10 km (6 mi) long northwest–southeast, and more than 3 km (2 mi). The reef area is about 25 km^{2} (9.7 sq mi). The closest land is the Egmont Atoll located 122 km (76 mi) to the NNE. The Centurion Bank is the southernmost feature of the Chagos group.
