= Ganges Bank =

Coordinates: 07°23′S 70°58′E

Location of Ganges Bank in the Indian Ocean

Ganges Bank is a wholly submerged atoll structure in the Southwest of the Chagos Archipelago. It is about 7 by 5 km in size, yielding an area of about 30 km^{2}. The closest land is the Egmont Atoll located 87 km (54 mi) to the NNE.
