= Colvocoresses Reef =

Atoll in the Indian Ocean

Coordinates: 04°54′S 72°37′E

Location of Colvocoresses Reef in the Indian Ocean

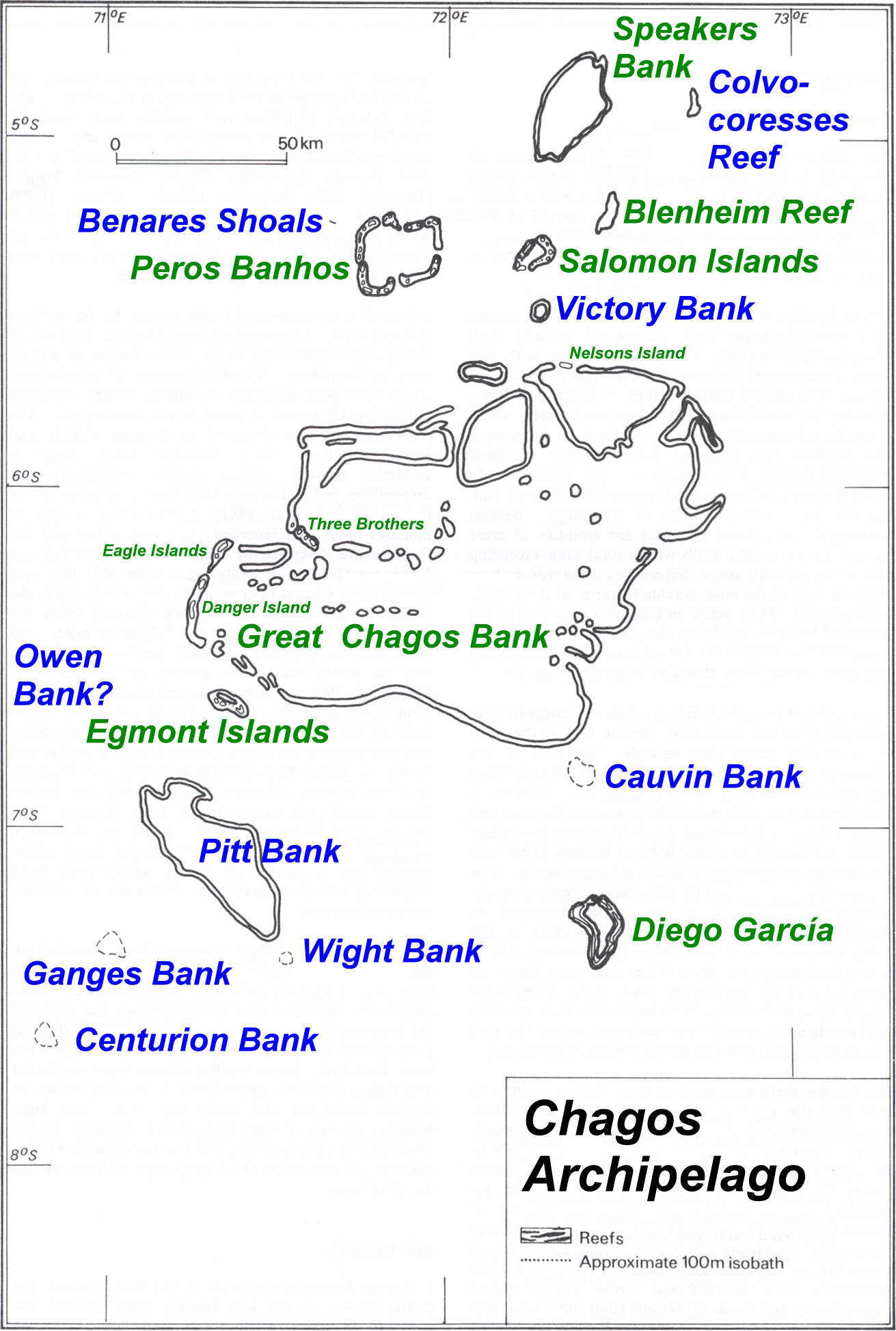
Map of Chagos-Archipelago in the Indian Ocean

Colvocoresses Reef is a wholly submerged atoll in the Indian Ocean. It is located in the northeastern part of the Chagos Archipelago, near Speakers Bank and Blenheim Reef. The reef is 8 km long, and measures 1 to 2 km across. Breakers are visible only during heavy seas.

== History ==
This submerged atoll is named after Alden Partridge Colvocoresses who in the 1970s together with John P. Snyder and John L. Junkins developed the Space-oblique Mercator projection.

The least charted depth is 9 m (30 ft) above the reef. This sounding was one of only a few that were ever incorporated into US nautical charts, having been derived not from sonar or lead line data, but from radiometric data from the Landsat Multispectral Scanner (MSS) imagery.

Colvocoresses Reef is unique in that it was discovered by use of images taken by the National Aeronautics and Space Administration's (NASA) Landsat Satellite (Originally called Earth Resources Technology Satellite (ERTS). Note that these early Landsat images covered a footprint on the surface of the earth of about 100 nautical miles (185 km) on a side. They also had a picture element (pixel) footprint of 80 m (262 ft) and could only detect features near that size. The original Landsat Multispectral Scanners (MSS) (On Landsat/ERTS 1-5) imaged the earth with several spectral bands. Each band provides a black-and-white image that is taken through a spectral filter. It has two non-thermal infrared bands for sensing plant vigor. These bands have very limited water penetration. Landsat also has two visible wavelength bands: red and green. Although the red band penetrates clear water to only about eight metres (26 ft) , the green band has been proven to see through clear ocean waters to depths of about 30–40 m (98–131 ft) . Since light is exponentially attenuated through the water column, given clear water and similar bottom reflectances, deeper water will appear darker on the Landsat images.

The original depth data for the shallow water areas on Chagos Archipelago nautical charts had been collected in the mid-1830s. Except for the areas around Diego Garcia, much of the data on the current small scale charts of the archipelago is from the 1830s data. In 1975, the Defense Mapping Agency's Hydrographic Center, subsequently incorporated into the National Geospatial-Intelligence Agency (NGA), requested NASA to collect Landsat images over the Chagos Archipelago. The images revealed the previously uncharted Colvocoresses Reef as well as errors in positioning of numerous other reefs in the Archipelago. Some were out of position by as much as 18 kilometres (11 miles).

By the summer of 1976 a new edition of the Chagos Archipelago nautical chart (#61610) was printed showing the corrected positions of the banks and shoals as well as Colvocoresses Reef. This was the first nautical chart known to have been completely revised using the Landsat imagery. The link at footnote #6 goes to an article that describes the updating of the chart from Landsat and shows images, old and new charts.

== Notice to mariners ==
The brightness of the reef was compared with the brightness of other reefs that had known depths and similar bottom reflections. It was deemed advisable to give in a notice to mariners a probable depth range for the reef with a caution on the chart that there were probably shallower features on the reef.

== See also ==
- Landsat program
- Multispectral pattern recognition
