= Benares Shoals =

Submerged coral reef of the Chagos Archipelago

Coordinates: 5°15′S 071°40′E

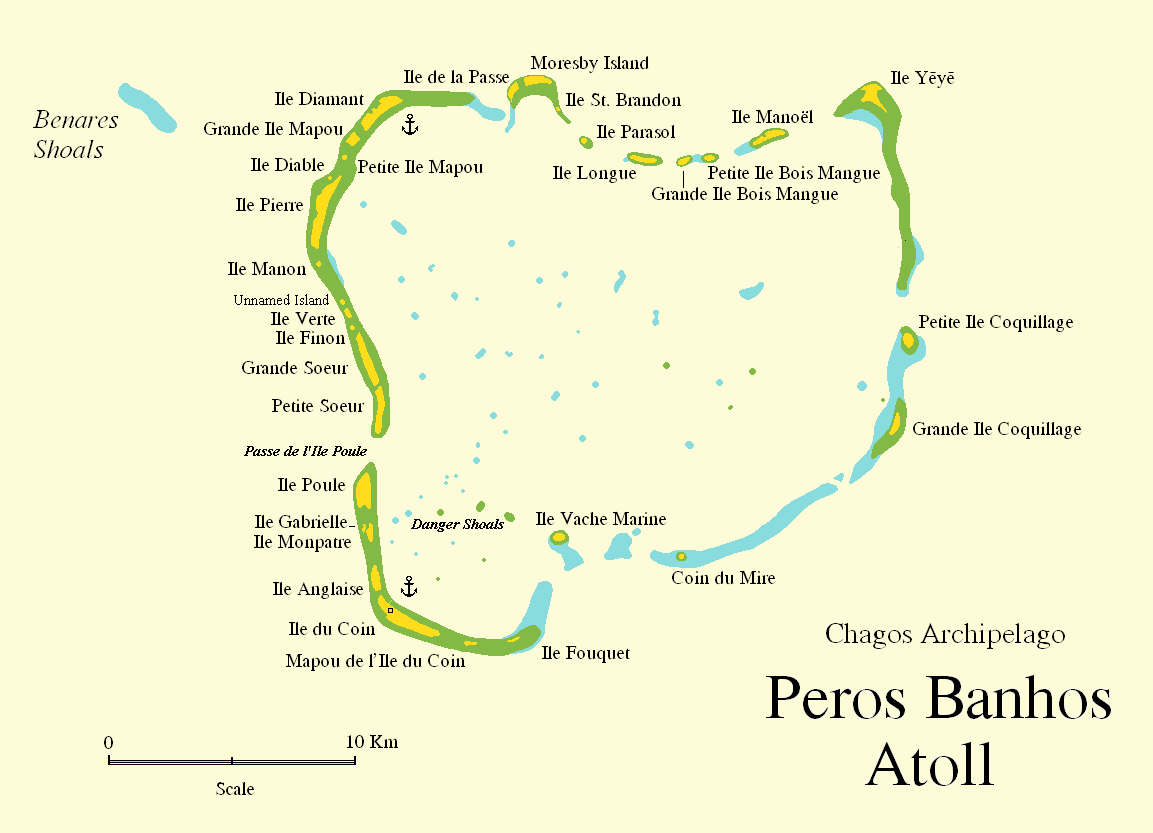
Map of Peros Banhos Atoll showing Benares Shoals on the upper left

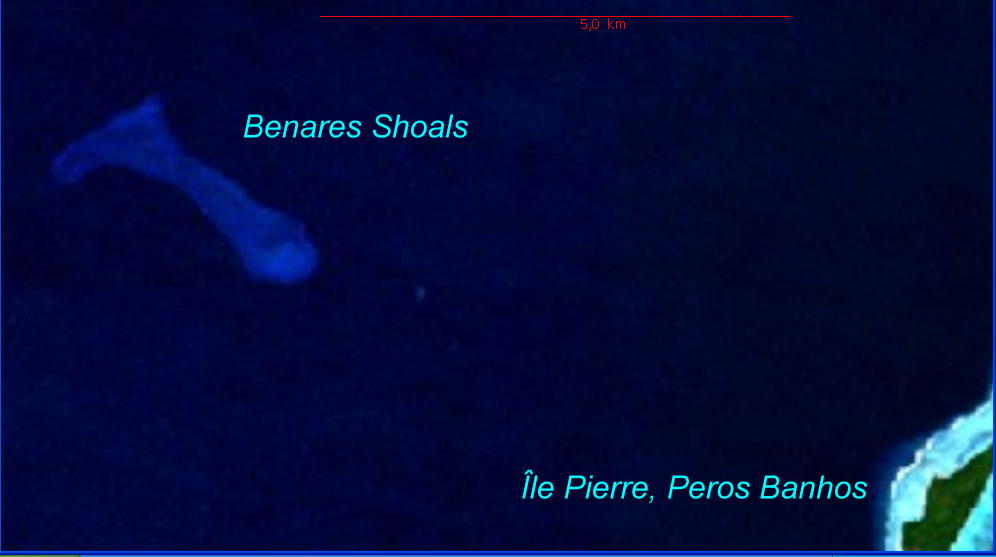
Landsat Visible Color Image of Benares Shoals, with Île Pierre of Peros Banhos at the lower right

Benares Shoals, or Benares Shoal, is a submerged coral reef, an isolated patch located at, just 6 kilometres (3.7 mi) west-northwest of Île Pierre, the closest island of Peros Banhos atoll in the northern Chagos Archipelago. It measures about 3 kilometres (2 mi) east–west, with a width of about 700 metres (2,300 ft) and an area of 2 square kilometres (0.77 mi^{2}). The least depth at the western end is 4.5 metres (15 ft).

The Benares Shoals were first surveyed in 1837 by Commander Robert Moresby of the Indian Navy on HMS Benares. Moresby's survey produced the first detailed map of this submerged reef, which was subsequently named after his ship.

== See also ==
- List of reefs
