= Cauvin Bank =

Location of Cauvin Bank in the Indian Ocean

Cauvin Bank is a wholly submerged atoll structure in the southern part of the Chagos Archipelago at 6°49′S 72°22′E, just about 7 km (4 mi) south of the southeastern corner of the rim of the Great Chagos Bank. It is roughly circular in shape, with a diameter of 4 km (2 mi), and an area of about 12 km^{2} (5 sq mi). There are least depths between 9 and 11 m (30 and 36 ft) in the northern part of the reef. The closest land is the northernmost part of Diego Garcia atoll, Middle Island, 41 km (25 mi) to the south.
