= Nelsons Island =

Uninhabited island in the Chagos Archipelago in the Indian Ocean

- Nelsons Island (Indian Ocean)

Geography
- Location: Indian Ocean
- Coordinates: 05°40′53″S 72°18′39″E
- Archipelago: Chagos Archipelago
- Area: 0.11 sq mi (0.28 km^{2})
- Length: 1.0 mi (1.6 km)
- Width: 0.1 mi (0.2 km)

Administration
- United Kingdom
- Mauritius
- Outer Islands: Chagos Archipelago

Nelsons Island or Nelson Island or Île Legour is a small uninhabited island in the Great Chagos Bank, of the Chagos Archipelago in the Indian Ocean. As a protected nature reserve, access to the island is strictly restricted.

The island is administered by the British Indian Ocean Territory, an overseas territory of the United Kingdom, but is due to become part of Mauritius following a 2025 agreement.

== Geography ==
The island is the northernmost and the easternmost island of the Great Chagos Bank, which is the world's largest coral atoll structure. The nearest neighbouring island is Île Boddam in the Salomon Islands, 22 miles (35 km) north-northwest from Nelsons Island. The island is 11 miles SSE of the wholly submerged Victory Bank atoll.

Nelsons Island occupies the only emerging reef structure in the northern fringe of the Great Chagos Bank. The island stretches in an East-West direction, with a length of 1.6 km (1 mi) and 250 m (820 ft) wide in its broadest area. There is a small, low-lying islet to the east called Îlot Legour.

In terms of its geology, detailed photographic images show evidence of a coral limestone core that has been overlaid by sandy loam.

== History ==
The first recorded discovery of the island was by a Mr Legour from Port Louis, Mauritius in 1820, with the island initially being called Isle Legour.

There are no records of the island being inhabited, even between the 17th and the 20th century when there were coconut plantations on other islands of the Chagos Archipelago.

== Wildlife ==
Nelsons Island has been identified as an Important Bird Area by BirdLife International, and is legally protected as a Strict Nature Reserve – making it an offence to visit the island without the written permission of the Government of the British Indian Ocean Territory.

An expedition in 2018 estimated the island was home to as many as 3000 roosting red-footed boobies, a population of brown boobies, and a significant colony of wedge-tailed shearwaters, as well as around 6500 nesting pairs of lesser noddies.

Birds benefit from the island being free from rats. The island also has a population of Meadow Argus butterflies.

Owing to its remoteness there has always been a population of nesting sea turtles.

The island is unique for the Chagos for having only two species of tree, Coconut and Pisonia, which both appear to have arrived naturally. The island is otherwise covered by the shrubs Scaveola and Argusia.

One of the major problems affecting the native wildlife is the significant accumulation of plastic bottles and other assorted debris such as damaged fishnets and shoes, as well as an assortment of plastic and polystyrene materials that are washed up by localised ocean currents, winds and sea-storms. Such debris was captured in images during the Catlin Seaview Survey in 2015.
