= Victory Bank =

Location of Victory Bank in the Indian Ocean

Victory Bank is a wholly submerged atoll structure in the Northern Chagos Archipelago at 5°33′S 72°14′E. It is located 17 kilometres (11 miles) NNW of Nelson Island, the only island on the northern rim of the Great Chagos Bank. Île Boddam, of the Salomon Islands, lies 17 kilometres (11 miles) to the north.

This submerged atoll is roughly elliptical in shape, with a size of 6 kilometres (3.7 miles) east-west and 4 kilometres (2.5 miles) north-south, and an area of about 19 square kilometres (7.3 square miles). It rises steeply from great depths. The lagoon is up to 33 metres deep, while the depth along much of the rim is only 5.5 metres.

== Biodiversity ==
In 2021 the Living Oceans Foundation found that the Victory Bank had both a "high coral diversity" as well as high numbers of Millepora. The most common coral found is Acropora. Seagrass was intermixed within the reef, although its mass was less than 1% of the substrate. It was also reported that despite a low diversity of fish, the Victory Bank holds the highest fish density (421.3 individuals/100 m^{2}) and highest ratio of large fish to other fish. This is unlike other areas of the Great Chagos Bank.
