= Peros Banhos =

Archipelago in the Chagos Archipelago

Coordinates: 5°20′S 71°51′E

Location of Peros Banhos Atoll in the Indian Ocean

Peros Banhos, Pedro dos Banhos or Baixos de Pêro dos Banhos in old maps, is an inhabited atoll in the Chagos Archipelago. It had been uninhabited from the expulsion of the Chagossians in 1971 until a group of four Chagossians returned to establish a settlement in 2026 on the Île du Coin.

Île Yeye, located at the northeastern corner of the atoll, is the island of the Chagos Archipelago that is closest to the Maldives.

== Geography ==
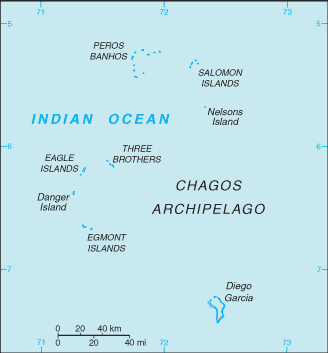
Location map of Chagos Archipelago, with Peros Banhos

The atoll has a total area of 503 km^{2} (194 sq mi), but a land area of only 9.6 km^{2} (3.7 sq mi), made up by some 32 islets. 490 km^{2} (189 sq mi), most of the remaining surface is occupied by the lagoon, which is connected to the open sea and the reef flat.

Peros Banhos is a medium-sized coralline atoll circled by a regular coral reef, similar to those in the neighboring Maldives. The diameter of the lagoon, known as Baie de Peros Banhos in French, is just above 20 km. The circling reef is sunken on its southeastern rim. All islands are flat and sandy and the largest ones are covered with coconut trees.

The largest and most important island in the group is Île du Coin. It was home to the Perch Settlement from where the coconut plantations of the atoll were run. This island was the main port of the atoll and had a jetty to load and unload merchandise.

Île du Coin was the only island that was settled permanently in Peros Banhos. Other important islands in the atoll that had buildings on them and were also occasionally inhabited were Grande Soeur, Île Diamant, Île Manoël and Île Pierre. All these islands were part of the former coconut plantation run from Île du Coin.

Île Yeye, at the northeastern corner of the atoll, is the island of the Chagos that is closest to the Maldives. The distance between Île Yeye and Gan Island (Addu Atoll) is 523 kilometres (325 mi).

There have been some changes in the geography of this atoll since the first maps were published in the mid-19th century. Île St. Brandon, which was covered with coconut trees when the first survey of this atoll was done, is now just a sandbank. On the other hand, in the western rim of Peros Banhos, the island north of Île Verte was only a small sandbank at the time of Commander Robert Moresby's Survey in 1837, but now it is a medium-sized island covered with vegetation.

== History ==
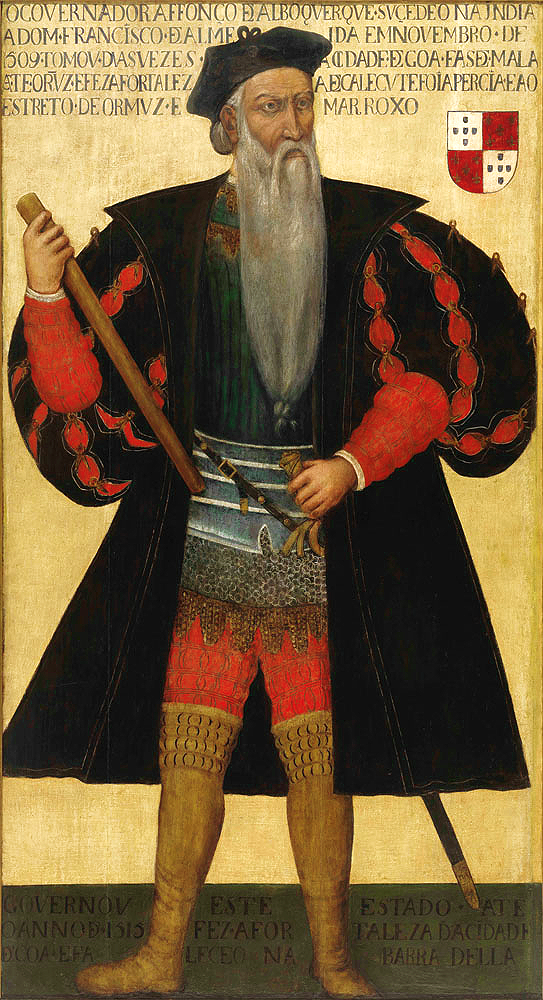
Afonso de Albuquerque, the Portuguese navigator who discovered Peros Banhos

Peros Banhos was discovered in 1513 by Portuguese navigator Afonso de Albuquerque. The name of this atoll derives from "Pêro dos Banhos", the name of another Portuguese navigator who died there after his ship ran aground on this atoll.

The earliest and most interesting description of Peros Banhos was written by Manoel Rangel in «A Tragédia dos Baixos de Pero dos Banhos». He was a castaway from the Portuguese ship Conceição under captain Francisco Nobre that ran aground and was smashed on the Peros Banhos reefs in 1556.

165 survivors were left on a flat sandy island of Peros Banhos before coconut trees were there; among them were two women and five Catholic priests. Rangel mentions that there were weeds and grasses and that about ten thousand birds lived on that Island. While the birds lasted the castaways survived, but they began to die in great numbers after having eaten most of the bird population.

According to Manoel Rangel there was drinking water to be found by digging shallow wells in the sand. Also many turtles came to lay eggs on the beach of that island. Since 1756 Île du Coin was home to a population of up to 500 people. Most of the inhabitants, the Ilois, were workers in the coconut plantations and in the oil-producing industry. The Ilois were Christian and there were churches and primary schools in Peros Banhos before the local population was moved away. Their language was a Creole version of French, known as Chagossian Creole.

There is a small bushy island called Île Diable on the NW of the atoll.

Moresby Island, at the northern end of Peros Banhos Atoll was named after Robert Moresby, a British hydrographer who made the first accurate survey of the Chagos Archipelago in 1837. After Moresby's survey, the first detailed map of Peros Banhos Atoll was published by the Hydrographic Service of the Indian Navy.

In 1970, the entire population of Peros Banhos Atoll was expelled by the British Government and sent to live in Mauritius. More recently, the islands have been investigated as a possible location for resettlement, although access is currently prohibited.

In February 2022, five exiled islanders made their first unsupervised visit to the atoll, following international court rulings and a majority vote in the UN General Assembly. Prime Minister of Mauritius, Pravind Jugnauth, said this was not to embarrass the UK, but "merely an exercise of our sovereignty over part of our territory and that is in accordance with international law."

== Nature Reserve ==
Peros Banhos Atoll Strict Nature Reserve

The part of the atoll east of a line drawn between the easternmost point of land on Moresby Island (north) and the easternmost point of land on Fouquet Island (south) fall within the Peros Banhos Atoll Strict Nature Reserve. Entry into this and into the other Strict Nature Reserves, and within 200 metres (660 ft) of the islands therein is prohibited and activities are clearly proscribed by the British Indian Ocean Territory. It has been identified as an Important Bird Area by BirdLife International because of its significance as a breeding site for sooty terns, of which 14,000 pairs were recorded in a 2004 survey.

Yachtsmen are advised not to even anchor within the limits of the Peros Banhos Atoll Strict Nature Reserve.

== List of islands ==
With some 32 islets, the Peros Banhos Atoll encompasses about half of all islands in the Chagos Archipelago. The individual islands and islets are listed clockwise, starting in the south:

Map of Peros Banhos	Southwest rim (between southern channel and Passe de l'Île Poule)	Northwest rim (between Passe de l'Île Poule and Moresby Channel)	Eastern part (east of southern channel and Moresby Channel)
Map of Peros Banhos	Île Fouquet; Mapou de l'Île du Coin; Île du Coin; Île Anglaise; Île Monpâtre; Île Gabrielle; Île Poule	Petite Soeur; Grande Soeur; Île Finon; Île Verte; Île de Chama; Île Manon; Île Pierre; Île Diable; Petite Île Mapou; Grande Île Mapou; Île Diamant	Île de la Passe; Moresby Island; Île Saint-Brandon; Île Parasol; Île Longue; Grande Île Bois Mangue; Petite Île Bois Mangue; Île Manoël; Île Animaux; Île Yeye (0.60 km^{2}); Petite Île Coquillage; Grande Île Coquillage; Coin du Mire; Île Vache Marine

Passe de l'Île Poule is also called Passe Elisabeth on older maps.

The islands in the eastern part are part of the Peros Banhos Strict Nature Reserve, except Île De La Passe and Moresby Island.

== Notable residents ==
- Misley Mandarin (current)
- Louis Olivier Bancoult (former)
- Liseby Elysé (former)
- Jessy Marcelin (former)
- Clément Siatous (former)

== Literature ==
- R.P. Roger Dussercle S. Sp., "Archipel de Chagos", En Mission 10 Novembre 1933 – 11 Januar 1934, Port Lois – Île Maurice: The General Printing & Stationery Cy. Ltd., T. Eclapon, Administrateur, MCMXXXIV
