= Speakers Bank =

Coral atoll in the Chagos Archipelago

Location of Speakers Bank in the Indian Ocean

Speakers Bank is a large coral atoll structure in the northwestern part of the Chagos Archipelago.

== Geography ==
It is the northernmost feature of the archipelago, located at 04°55′S 72°20′E, approximately 22km northwest of Blenheim Reef and is 44km northeast-southwest direction, and is about 24km wide. The total area is 582km^{2}, most of which is water. Most of the rim of the reef is between 5.5 and 14.5 metres below water. In the south, near the southwest edge (05°04'S, 072°16'E) some coral heads rise to 0.5 metres above sea level when in low tide, and the sea breaks heavily over them during the southeast trade winds. In the northeast, at 04°47'S, 072°26'E, there are a number of drying cays, the biggest of which, Big Speaker Reef, just reaches the high water mark. The land area is negligible.

== History ==
Speakers Bank was surveyed in 1856 by British captain J. Speaker on HMS Wallerup. It is the site of many shipwrecks, including some from earlier times.
