= Egmont Islands =

Indian Ocean atoll administered by the UK

Coordinates: 6°40′S 71°21′E

Map of Egmont Islands or Six Iles

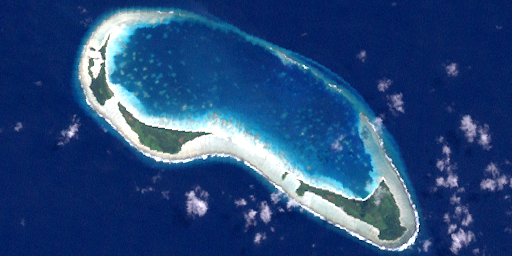
Landsat picture of the atoll

Egmont Islands (also known as Egmont Atoll, or Six Iles) is an uninhabited atoll that is one of the few emerged coral atolls that make up the Chagos Archipelago.

This small atoll lies less than 10km south of the southwestern rim of the Great Chagos Bank submerged coral reef. Its total size is 29km², including the lagoon and the fringing coral reef. The land area totals about 4km². The nearest island is Danger Island on the Great Chagos Bank, less than 30km due north.

There are two passages into the lagoon along the Northern Rim, Fausse Passe in the northeast and a wider passage in the northwest. The Egmont Islands are one of the favorite anchoring spots for itinerant yachtsmen passing through the Chagos.

== Islands ==
The largest island is "Île Sud-Est" (Eastern Egmont), where the settlement was located, with an area of 1.5km². While "Île Lubine" is similar in size, the other islets are smaller. All islands are covered with coconut trees. The individual islands are all on the southern rim of the coral reef. They are, from southeast to northwest:

1. Île Sud-Est (Southeast Island)
2. Île Takamaka (Takamaka Island)
3. Île Carre Pate (Square Island)
4. Île Lubine (Lubine Island)
5. Île Cipaye (Cipaye Island)
6. Île aux Rats (Rat Island)

West of Ile aux Rats there was a small islet known as Ilot aux Rats (Islet with Rats)(Ile des Rats) which has now merged with Ile aux Rats. Ile Cipaye is also spelled 'Sipaille' and 'Cipaille'. Isle Carre Pate is also spelled 'Carpathe'. On some maritime charts Ile Takamaka is spelled as 'Tattamucca'.

== History ==
Ile Sudest, the largest island, was first settled in the last half of the 18th century, at the time when the other atolls of the Chagos were settled by the French.

Commander Robert Moresby made a survey of this atoll and charted it in 1838. At that time there was a coconut plantation on this atoll. A causeway had been built linking the islands and some land reclamation was done. Eventually some of the islands merged with each other.

The Egmont Islands were no longer inhabited in the second half of the 20th century, at the time that the Chagossians or Ilois were evicted from the Chagos.

In 1972–73 there was an underwater expedition to the Egmont Islands by the Joint Services (JSEI). Led by Sqn Leader “Dickie” Bird RAF, it was the first expedition of its kind in the Chagos. Cdr Alan Baldwin RN was the Deputy Leader and the scientific work was carried out under the direction of Dr David Bellamy. Its aim was to study coral reef formation and growth, as well as the islands' flora and fauna. The expedition members were taken from Gan, Addu Atoll by RFA Gold Ranger to Egmont Atoll and after their survey was completed they were brought back to Gan by RFA Stromness. Following its success, a second expedition was undertaken to Danger Island the following year.
