= Army Map Service =

U.S. Army Map Service
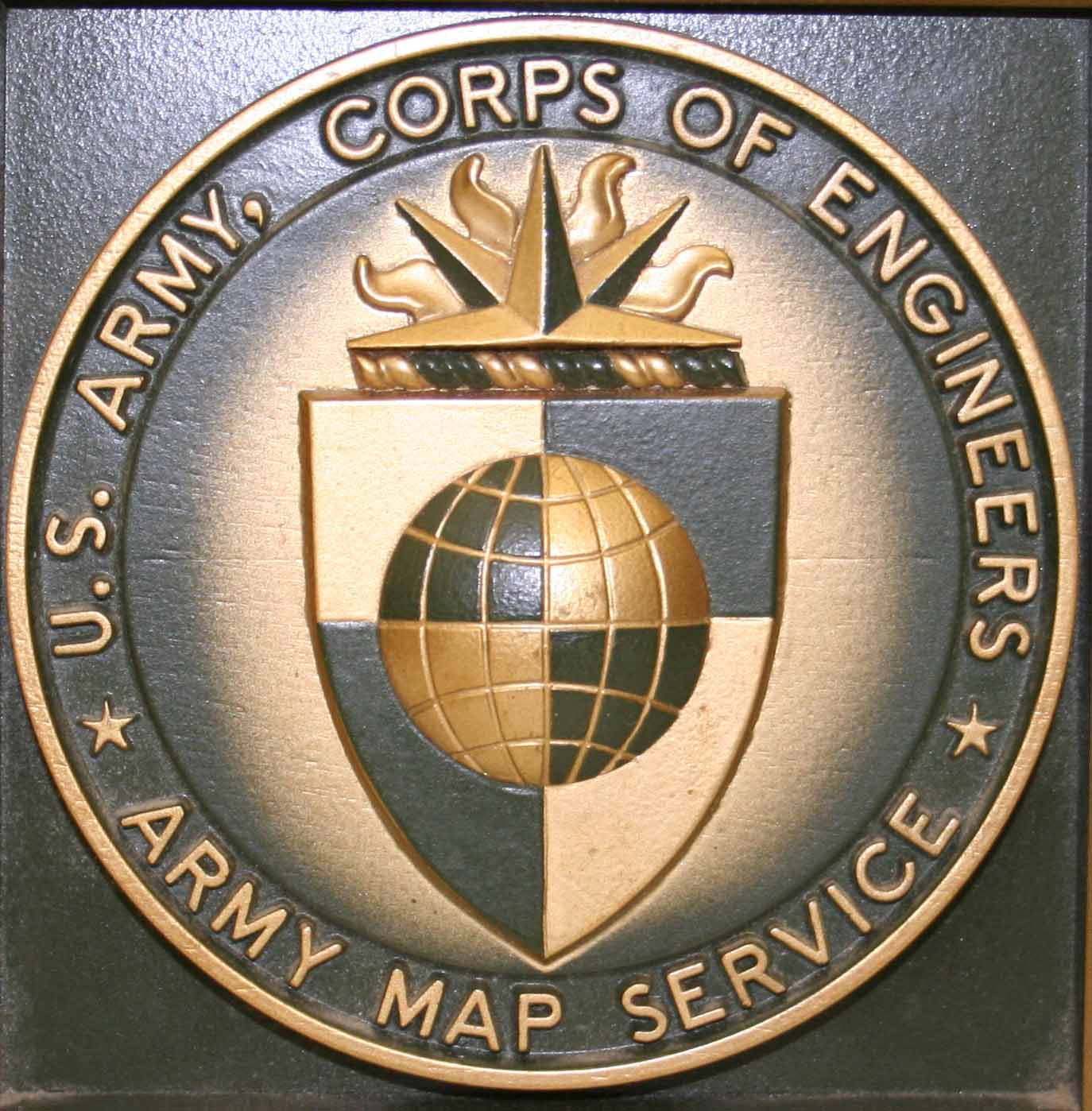
- Coat of Arms of the U.S. Army Map Service
- Active: 1941–1968
- Country: United States
- Allegiance: United States Army

The Army Map Service (AMS) was the military cartographic agency of the United States Department of Defense from 1941 to 1968, subordinated to the United States Army Corps of Engineers. On September 1, 1968, the AMS was redesignated the U.S. Army Topographic Command (USATC) and continued as an independent organization until January 1, 1972, when it was merged into the new Defense Mapping Agency (DMA) and redesignated as the DMA Topographic Center (DMATC). On October 1, 1996, DMA was folded into the National Imagery and Mapping Agency (NIMA), which was redesignated as the National Geospatial-Intelligence Agency (NGA) in 2003.

The major task of the Army Map Service was the compilation, publication and distribution of military topographic maps and related products required by the Armed Forces of the United States. The AMS was also involved in the preparation of extraterrestrial maps of satellite and planetary bodies; the preparation of national intelligence studies; the establishment of world geodetic control networks by both satellite and conventional triangulation methods; and the logistic military planning of Corps of Engineer items. Another major responsibility of the AMS was to maintain the largest geodetic and topographic data libraries for the Department of Defense.

== World War I ==
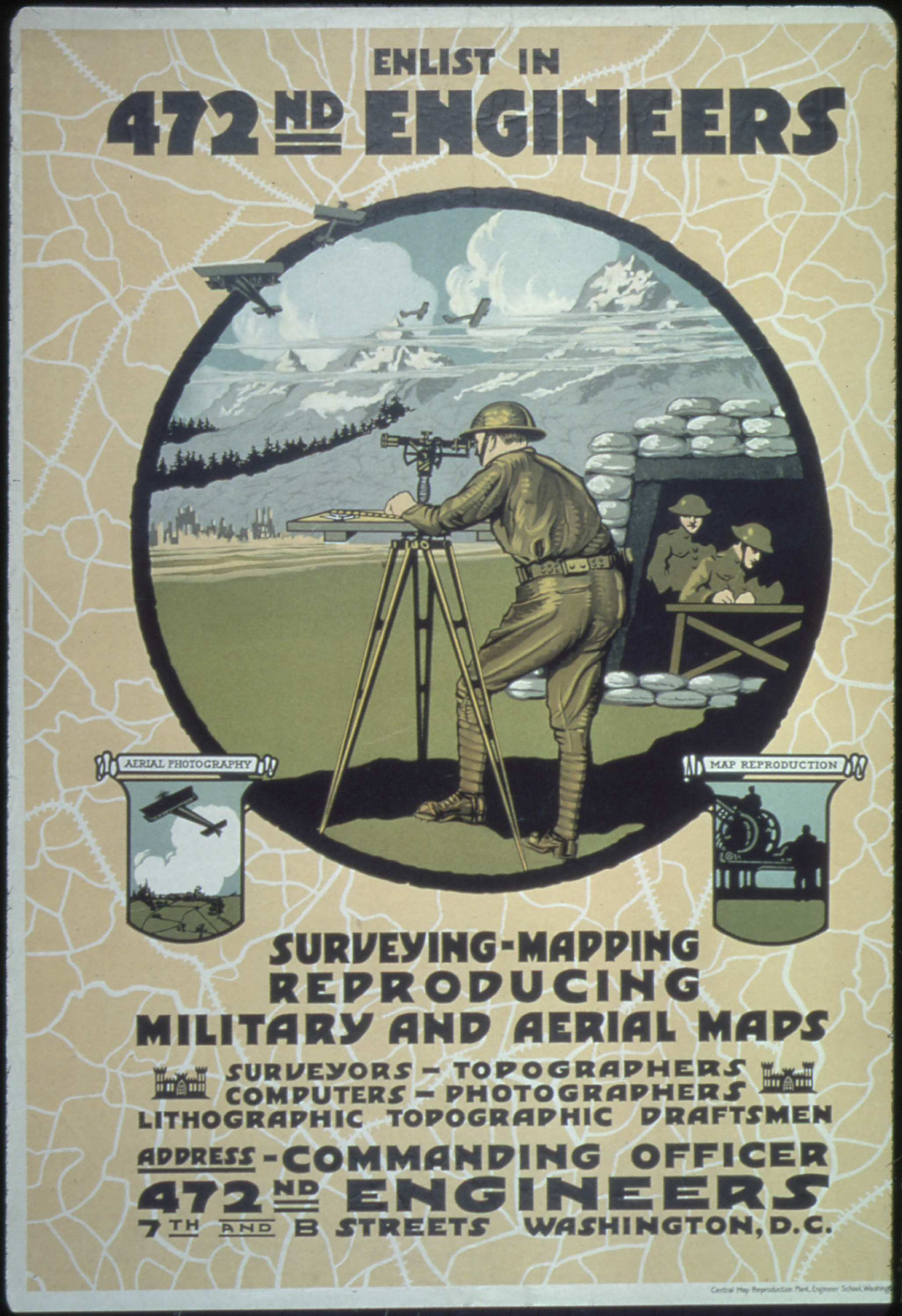
World War I recruitment poster for the 472nd Engineers (1918–1919), a regiment of the United States Army Corps of Engineers

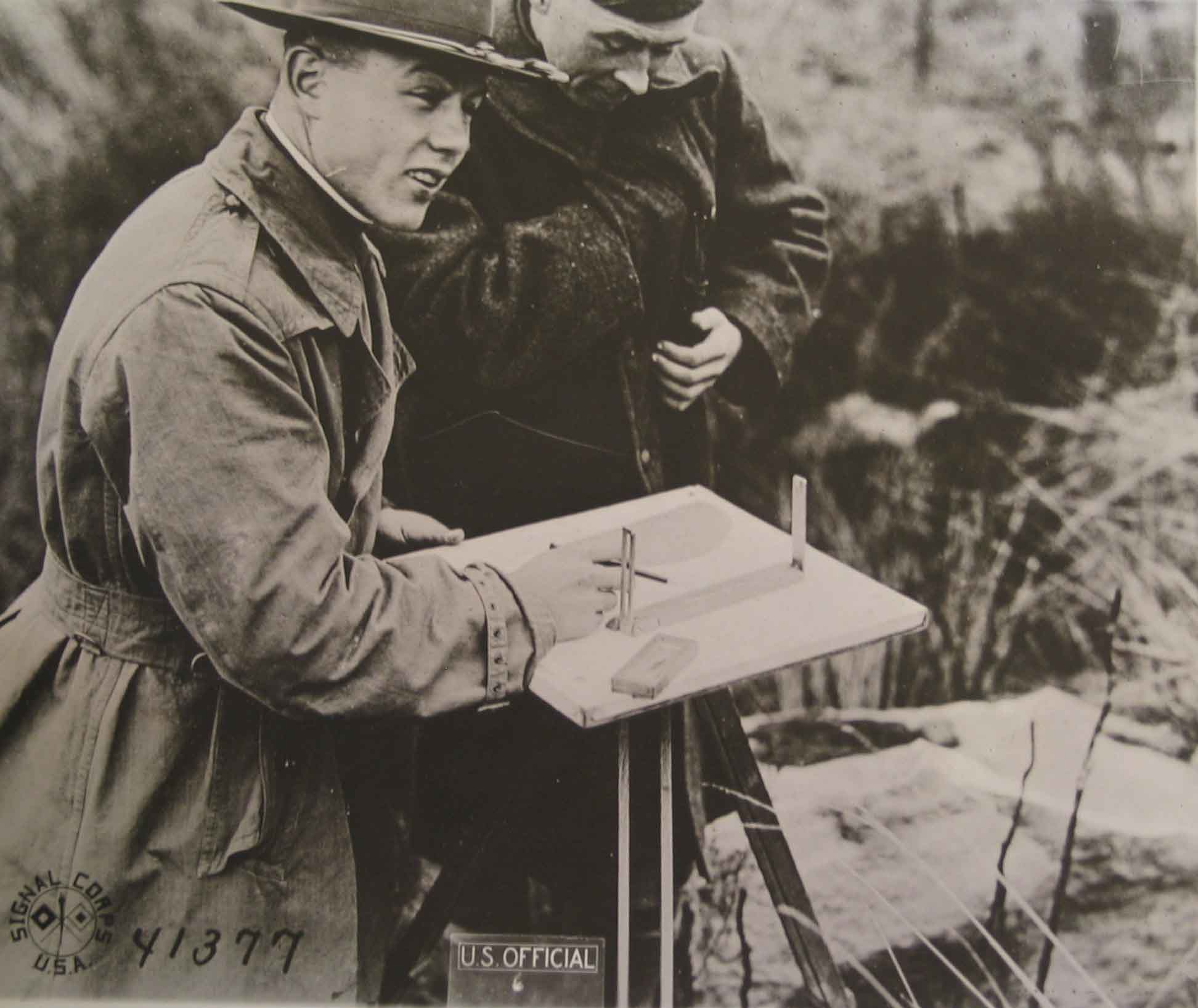
U.S. Army Corps of Engineers topographic engineer making a map during World War I

"The Army Map Service had its inception in a warehouse located at Ft. McNair (formerly the Army War College), where space was set aside in 1910 to accommodate a reproduction unit and lithographic school. The combined elements formed the Central Map Reproduction Plant (CMRP). With the advent of World War I in 1917, the CMRP was re-organized and expanded by Major Charles H. Ruth in anticipation of a map supply crisis and was renamed the Engineer Reproduction Plant (EMP)."

In 1910, the Map Reproduction Plant was given warehouse space at Ft. McNair, to accommodate the map reproduction unit of the Corps of Engineers. Ultimately named the Central Map Reproduction Unit, it incorporated a lithographic school and 18 assigned military personnel. After World War I, this would be renamed the Engineer Reproduction Plant. The ERP was noted for experimentation on cartographic and photolithographic processes and media. They also experimentation in aerial photogrammetry.

A number of US Geological Survey employees were assigned to the US Army Corps of Engineers 29th Engineers, a map organization, during World War I. Major G.S. Smith commanded part of the 29th Engineers, a map making and topographical unit, with 53 officers and 146 men transferred from the US Geological Survey. Thirteen additional USGS topographers were assigned to the United States Army Coast Artillery Corps as "orienteur officers." When the 2nd Brigade of Coast Artillery was formed, the military made a similar request for more USGS personnel, but the order was denied as these men were needed for the US Army Corps of Engineers.

After World War I, the 29th Engineer (Topo) Battalion performed the Nicaragua Canal Survey. It was at this time that Benjamin B. Talley, later a brigadier general, invented a portable stereocomparagraph for map making.

== World War II ==
The AMS's mobile mapping units
524th Engineer Topographic Company field exercise, Germany, c. 1953

The Army Map Service was formed during World War II from the consolidation of the Engineer Reproduction Plant, the Library and the Cartographic Section of the War Department General Staff. Initially, many of the maps produced were revisions of existing maps. By the middle of the war, the cartographic work was changed to medium and small scale maps utilizing larger scale native maps as source materials. By the end of the war, considerable effort was being applied to large scale mapping by stereo-photogrammetric methods.

Between 1941 and 1945, the Army Map Service prepared 40,000 maps of all types, covering 400,000 square miles of the Earth's surface. Over 500 million copies were produced during the war. Many were produced by civilian women trained after Pearl Harbor, the "Military Mapping Maidens." The North African Campaign alone required 1,000 different maps with a total of 10 million copies. The Normandy invasion required 3,000 different maps with a total of 70 million copies. Similar commitments were filled for the Pacific and Far East operations.

Maps of all types were needed, from the strategic level maps to tactical level maps. "Indeed, General George S. Patton claims to have planned Third Army movements by using a Michelin tourist road map of Europe, his knowledge of terrain, and gut-level feeling that tanks could negotiate the ground William the Conqueror had crossed nine centuries before."

The Corps of Engineers mapping output differs from general mapping agencies, such as the USGS, in that it is usually at a much larger scale (design/construction) and is project-specific; however, the mapping procedures used since World War II are not much different. Between 1949 and 1951, standardization of military mapping was agreed to between Canada, Great Britain and the US, and was expanded to NATO, SEATO and CENTO countries as well. This involved the application of the UTM to over 10,000 different maps covering 400,000 square miles and the printing of over 90,000,000 copies.

== Korean War ==
The Army Map Service distributed 750,000 maps to all services during the first two weeks of the Korean War. In the following two weeks five million maps were printed, while in the first four weeks of the conflict, the Far East Command printed and distributed 10 million maps.

In 1954, the 29th Engineer Topographic Battalion assumed responsibility for Korea and Okinawa and moved to Tokyo, Japan. There it absorbed the 64th Engineer Battalion and continued its mission of providing topographic support to U.S. and Allied forces in the Pacific Theatre, particularly to combat commands in Southeast Asia. In May 1966, the unit (less its survey element) moved to Ford Island, Hawaii, and was the primary map production unit for U.S. Forces in Vietnam. In January 1969, the unit was awarded the Meritorious Unit Commendation by the CINC, U.S. Army Pacific. A second Meritorious Unit Commendation was awarded in 1972.

== Inter-America Geodetic Survey ==
The Corps of Engineers also participated in the Inter-American Geodetic Survey for mapping Central and South America. As part of this research many poorer nations could develop their resources. In Cuba, for instance, an extensive water table survey by IAGS made it possible to develop 500 wells.

== Vietnam War ==
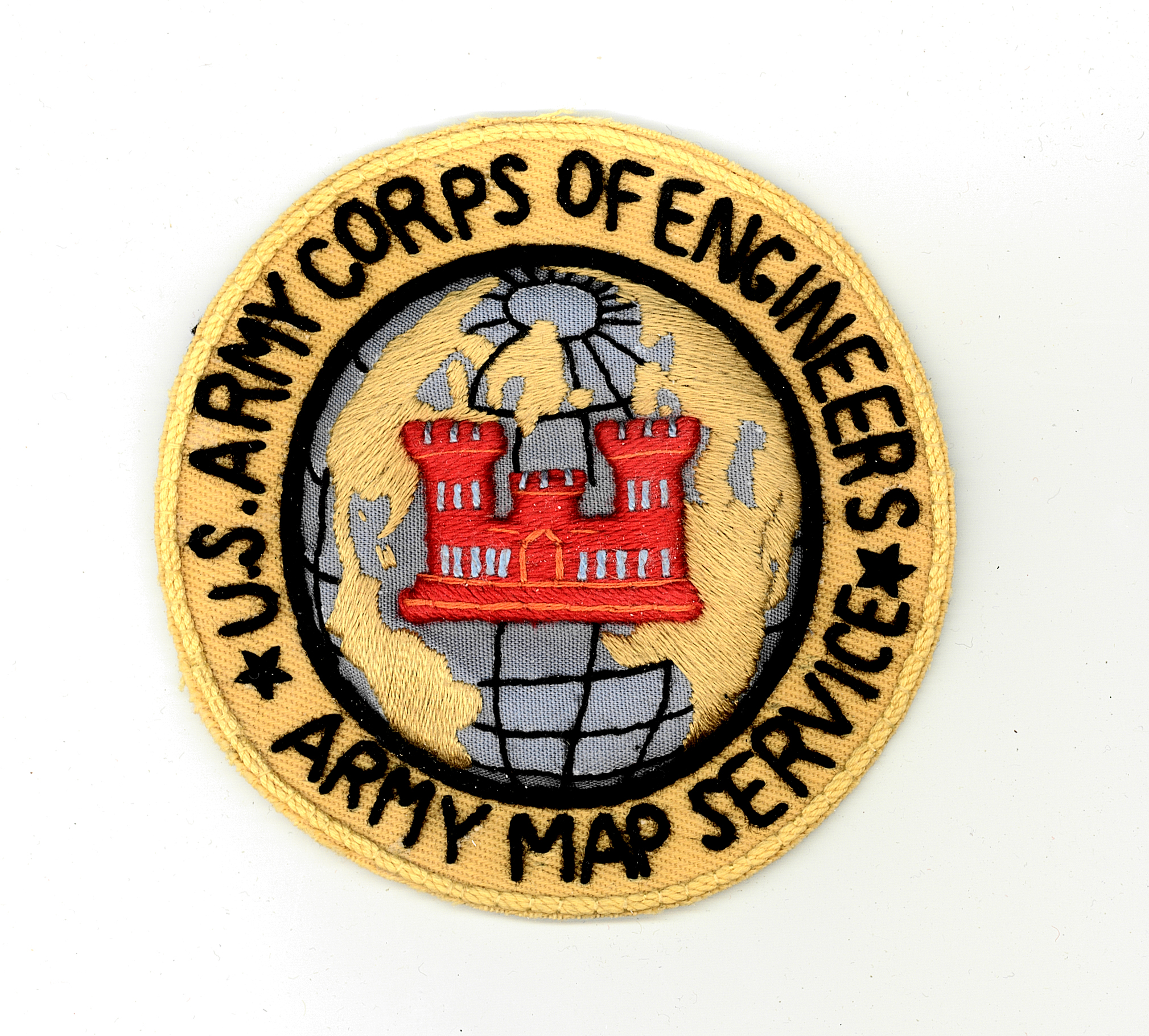
Shoulder patch of the U.S. Army Corps of Engineers, Army Map Service

From the outbreak of the operations in the Vietnam War in December 1966, the Army Map Service printed and shipped more than 200 million maps.

Mapmaking provided another area for engineer innovation in Vietnam. Up to date map and topographic information were key ingredients to military operations in Vietnam, especially the placement of artillery fire. During the early stages of the war, artillery units normally supported ground units from fixed positions into which ground control had been extended. Surveys enabled the artillery to ensure the accuracy of fire, but as artillery units moved to more remote areas it became more difficult to support friendly units because surveys were lacking. In early 1967, Lt. Col. Arthur L. Benton, the former chief of the Mapping and Intelligence Section of the Engineer Sections, United States Army Vietnam, who had returned to Vietnam on temporary duty from the Army Map Service in Washington, D.C., developed a system known as photogrammetric positioning. By tying aerial photographs to base maps, artillery surveyors could readily obtain azimuth and location of firing positions. Then, working with the photographs and overprint of a map, aerial observers could give accurate references to targets. Tests proved favorable, and a system was in place after Operation Cedar Falls.

== Foreign activities ==
The Army Map Service Special Foreign Activities are carried out by the 64th Engineer Battalion (Base Topographic). Its assigned mission was to provide AMS with required geodetic, mapping control and field classification data which are used in the production of various scale topographic maps. The battalion operated in Libya, Iran, Ethiopia (including the Ethiopia – United States Mapping Mission) and Liberia, and in some of the most rugged terrain in the world. Environmental conditions within the areas of operation created physical hazards such as miles of desert, blinding sandstorms that imperil health and damage delicate instruments, mountains that range up to 15,000 ft (4,600 m) above sea level, and steaming jungles with wild animals, dangerous reptiles and insects. These were routine field conditions for the men of the 64th.

== Space Age ==
During the early years of the Space Age, geodetic investigations by the USACE determined the earth's size and shape, and included precise geodetic and astronomic surveys in many remote areas of the Pacific, the Arctic, Asia and South America. Work by Dr. Irene Fischer helped determine the parallax of the moon, and her geoid studies helped in investigating the lingering effects of the last ice age. The Corps of Engineers participated in the Vanguard satellite program with the US Army Signal Corps and US Navy to obtain astronomic, geodetic and gravimetric observations to determine the size and shape of the earth, intercontinental relationships and gravity fields. Continuing this work, Alden Colvocoresses developed the Space-oblique Mercator projection, which was used with the Landsat satellite to make the first satellite produced map of the US.

The AMS and other agencies, split off to form the U.S. Army Engineer Research and Development Laboratories (USAERDL) in 1947; then evolved next into the Geodesy, Intelligence and Mapping Research and Development Agency (GIMRADA) in 1960; then the Engineer Topographic Laboratories (ETL) in 1967; and then became the Topographic Engineering Center (TEC), which came to be housed at the Humphreys Engineer Center in Alexandria, Virginia. TEC did research in such fields as terrain analysis and geospatial data generation; developed imagery exploitation, rapid prototyping, and other systems; and conducted operations in areas such as geospatial information, crisis support, urban studies, and historical photo environmental analysis. Reflecting TEC's growing responsibilities in more diverse and technologically sophisticated areas, its name was changed to the Army Geospatial Center in 2009. It continues to support both military and civil works activities.

== Bibliography ==
- Colby, Carroll B. 1959. Mapping the World: A Global Project of the Corps of Engineers, US Army. New York: Coward McCann. 48 pages.
- Jacob, George A. 2007. "29th Engineer Topographic Battalion." From: "The Ethiopia-United States Mapping Mission." See the site, accessed February 27, 2009: https://web.archive.org/web/20121010205155/http://www.ethi-usmappingmission.com/179410/296134.html?*session*id*key*=*session*id*val*
- Leviero, Anthony. 1956. "Big Map Job: Seventeen Countries are being Surveyed by the Inter-American Geodetic Survey under the Direction of a Colonel of the Army's Corps of Engineers." Army. March 1956. Pages 29–34.
- Livingston, Robert G. 1963. A History of Military Mapping Camera Development. Technical Note 63-1. Wright Patterson Air Force Base, Ohio. May 1, 1963. 37 pages.
- Nowicki, Albert L. 1961. Topographic Lunar Mapping at the Army Map Service. Washington, DC: Army Map Service. Technical Report. 20 pages.
- Pilkey, Orrin H. 1996. The Corps and the Shore. Washington, DC: Island Press. 272 pages.
- United States. Army Map Service. 1960. The Army Map Service: Its Mission, History and Organization. Washington. GPO. 41 pages.
- U.S. Army Engineer Topographic Laboratories. 1989. ETL, U.S. Army Engineer Topographic Laboratories. Fort Belvoir, VA: The Laboratories.
- United States. 1968. U.S. Army, Corps of Engineers, Army Map Service. Washington: Army Map Service. OCLC: 15670070.
