= Erhard Etzlaub =

German cartographer (c. 1455–1532)

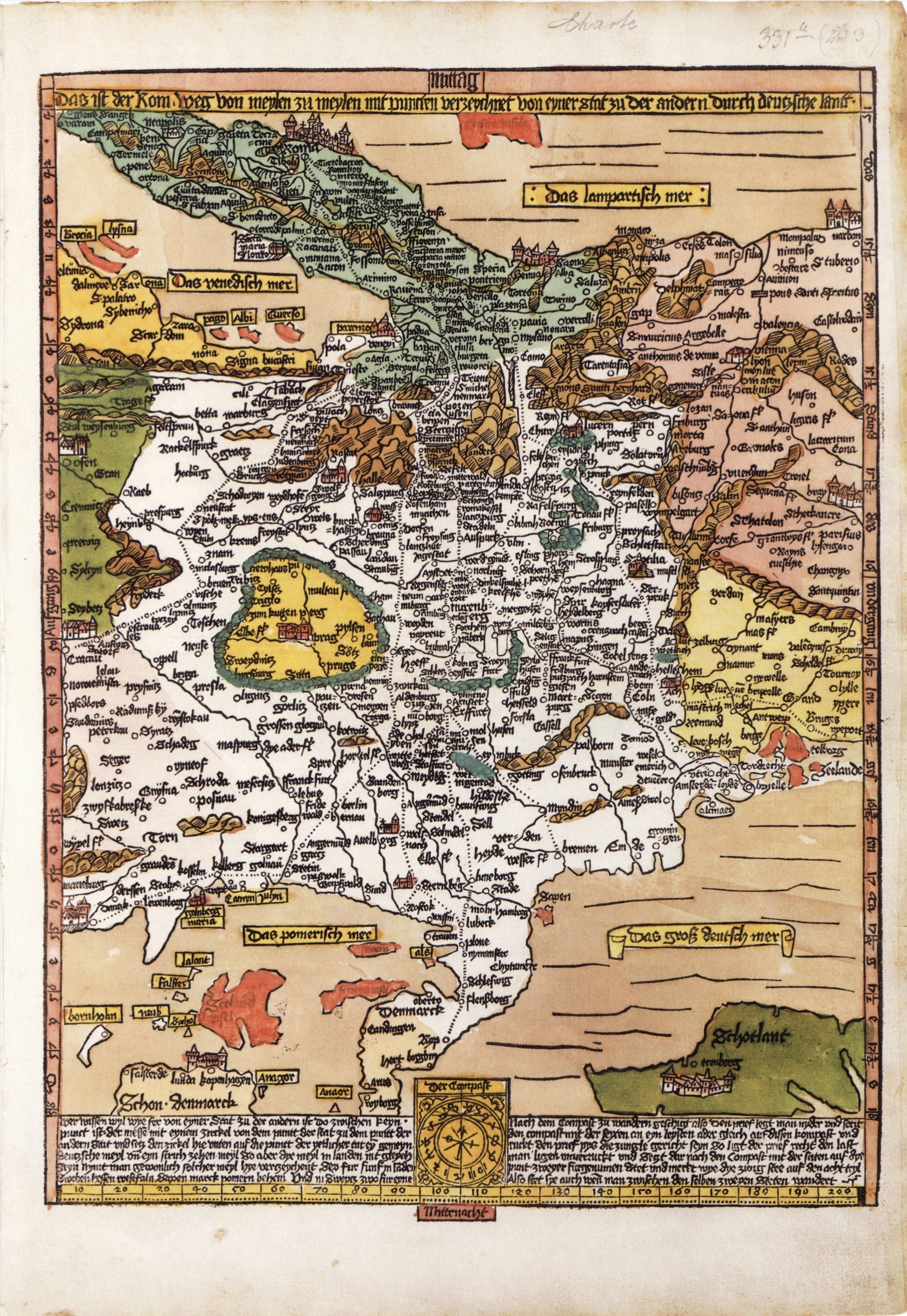
"Romweg" map, 1500. "South-up" display, as in all of Etzlaub's maps.

Erhard Etzlaub (c. 1455/1465 – 1532) was a German cartographer, astronomer, geodesist, instrument maker, and physician.

== Life ==
Little is known of Etzlaub's life. One "Erhart Etzlauber" became a citizen of Nuremberg in 1484, but his profession was not recorded on that occasion. Assuming that the "Eberhardus Eczleiben" who matriculated at the Erfurter Hochschule in 1469 is the same person, then the year of his birth should be between 1455 and 1460 rather than later.

Letters from a third party dated 1500 and 1507 describe Etzlaub as a well-known instrument ("compass") maker and a geodesist, and a letter dated 1517 reveals that "he had also practicised as a physician for at least four years" and that he "comes from Erfurt". In 1515, he declared himself to be an "astronomer and physician, from Erfurt University".

His death is officially quoted as the 15th entry in an official list of 20 people buried between December 20, 1531, and February 21, 1532. Therefore, he very probably died in January or early February 1532. There were no inheritors.

== The cartographer ==
=== The "Romweg" Map ===
On the occasion of the Holy Year 1500, when many pilgrims were expected to go to Rome, he designed his famous "Rom-Weg" map (= the Way to Rome), a 41 × 29 cm wood engraving in stereographic projection to a scale of about 1:5,600,000. This is the earliest printed road map of central Europe. It is, as all of Etzlaub's maps, "south up". Distances between cities can be computed by dotted lines, where a one-dot-step means one German Mile (7400m). Coloured prints (according to author's innovative requirements) show political regions, too.

The area of the map is between latitudes 58° (Viborg, Denmark) and 41° (Naples). No longitudes are given, but Paris shows up at the western margin, and Budapest at the eastern one. Data may have been drawn from c.1421 Klosterneuburg Fridericus map as well as from Etzlaub's own interviews with travelling merchants.

=== The "Roman Empire" road map ===
This was a second and improved edition of principally the same map, 1501, 54.5 × 39.7 cm, printed in Nuremberg by Georg Glogkendon. In 1533, Glogkendon's son Albrecht printed one more (unchanged) edition. The area covered by that later map was expanded to latitude 40° (south of Salerno), and about 74 more km towards west, and the map was more detailed in former marginal regions.

From all three editions, only 6 samples are known to have survived (e.g. the ones held by SUB (Göttingen), Germanisches Nationalmuseum (Nuremberg), Bibliothèque Nationale (Paris), British Library (London)), but Etzlaub's data were widely used during the first half of the 16th century, among others by Martin Waldseemüller and Sebastian Munster. Often, even the "south up" display was copied.

=== More maps ===
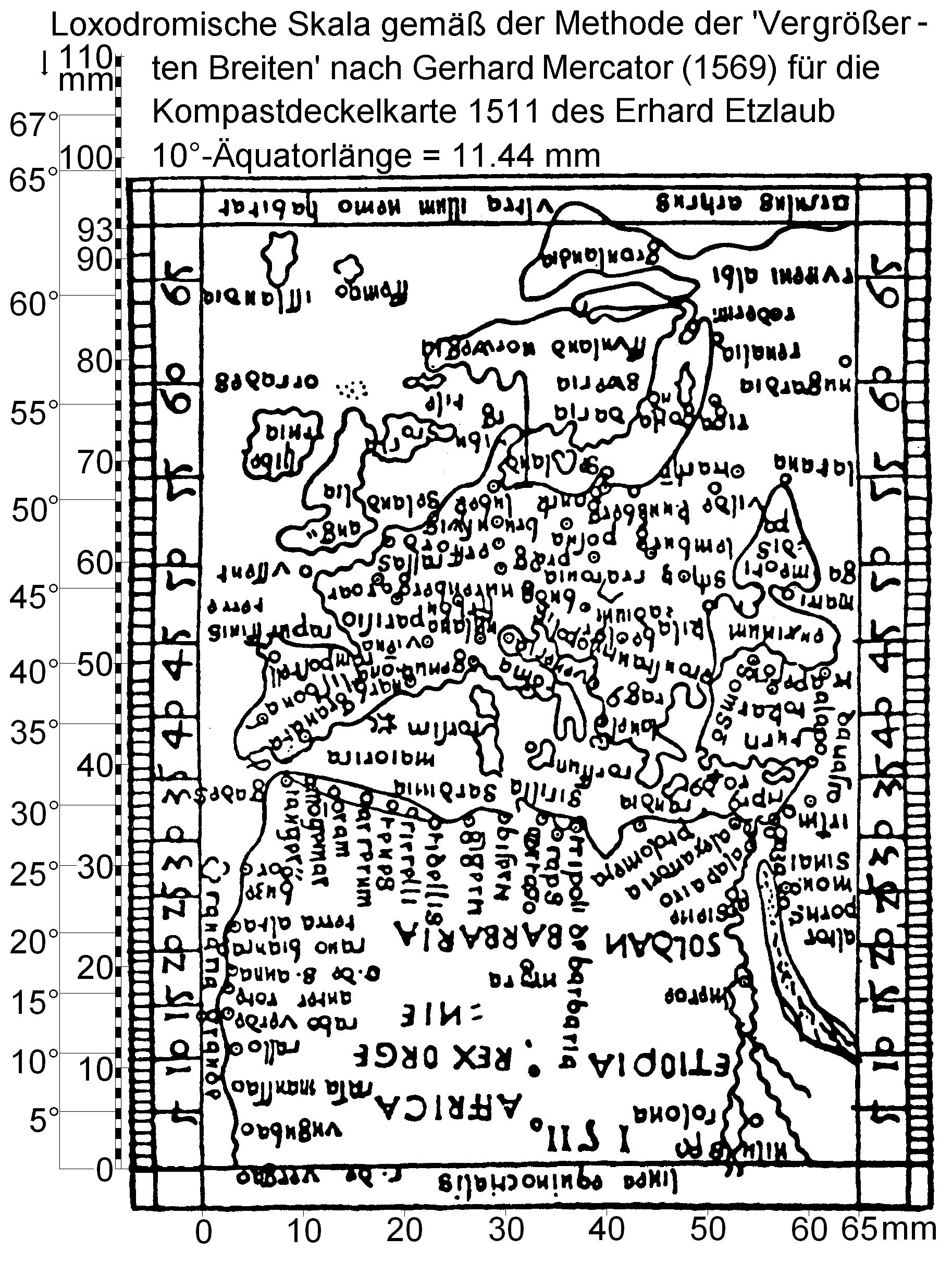
Miniature map (93 × 65 mm) on the outside of 1511-sundial's hinged lid. This one and a similar one from 1513 were by error called precursors of Mercator's projection since 1917.

Besides the innovative "Romweg" map and its later editions, only two still existing maps are definitely known to be designed by Etzlaub:

1. A 1492 wood-cut (39 × 27 cm, printed by Jorg [George] Glogkendon, Nuremberg), showing 100 localities and their names within a radius of 120 km from Nuremberg.
2. Another map of Nuremberg's territory, 1519, painted on parchment by Nuremberg painter Michel Graf (scale ca. 1:30.000, 94 × 84 cm).
- An earlier similar map, from 1516, came to us only as a copy made in 1600.
- A 1507 plan of Hauseck real estates bought by the Nuremberg magistrate is lost.
- With some probability (being very similar to the 1519 map), a map from 1516, parchment, 60 × 69 cm is Etzlaub's design.
- The earliest map of Bohemia, created by Mikuláš Klaudyán (Nikolaus Klaudian or Claudianus) and printed in Nuremberg in 1518, is likely to be somehow "connected" to Etzlaub: Klaudyán stayed at Nuremberg several times during the years before, and one of Etzlaub's Almanachs appeared in Czech in 1517 although Etzlaub is very unlikely to have spoken it. The Klaudyán map is "South-up", shows an outline of Bohemia's borders similar to the "Romweg" map, and is coloured in a similar way.

== The instrument maker ==
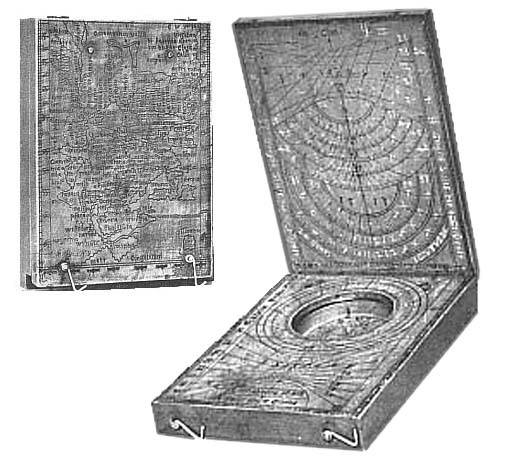
Etzlaub's 1513 sundial, 84 × 116 mm.

"Kompast" [sic!] was the term used for pocket-size sundials produced in Nuremberg since Regiomontanus' days, which were fitted with a compass, too, and were also used by seafarers. Only two of Etzlaub's pieces remain: one, from 1511, is kept by Germanisches Nationalmuseum (Nuremberg), another one, from 1513 and in Drecker's collection, purportedly "went to the USA".

In his time, Etzlaub's pieces were demanded: In a 1507 letter, Michel Beheim, brother of famous globe maker Martin Behaim, tells his brother Wolfgang that such pieces (i.e. more than one) will be sent to him to Lisbon within a few weeks, as soon as Etzlaub would have finished them. Johannes Cochlaeus notes on Etzlaub's work in Brevis Germaniae Descriptio, 1512, that his sundials were even demanded in Rome.

Miniature maps (latitudes 67°–0°, "South-up", no longitudes given) are engraved on the outside of the instrument's lids, allowing its user to adjust the gnomone according to actual latitude. To cope with compass bearings between the cities given, varying latitudes were used, reducing scale for lower latitudes, which was innovative, but conceptually opposite to Mercator's later approach (F.W. Krücken, 2004). In 1917, Joseph Drecker (1853–1931) had examined the 1513 miniature map and declared it to be a Mercator projection. After carefully analyzing both Etzlaub's und Mercator's maps, Krücken finds out: "There is no reason to see Etzlaub as a precursor of Mercator's projection".

Instructions on the use of his sundials were given by Etzlaub in Codex ad Compastum Norembergensem which was kept by Staatsbibliothek, Munich, Germany, but seems lost.

== Etzlaub's "almanachs" ==
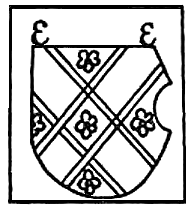
Etzlaub's coat of arms.

Those were calendars to be hanged on the wall, giving festive days, new and full moon, some planet's positions and hints on healthcare like best times for blood-letting. They show up since 1515. It is likely that Etzlaub published them every year, although the preserved samples are not continuous. According to different regions where they would be sold, the same content was presented in a varying design. From 1520, four different versions exist, designed for "Hochstift Eichstädt", "City of Regensburg", "Pfalzbayern" and Austria.

Since 1517, Etzlaub's coat of arms shows up in many but not all of his almanacs. It seems, however, to be unknown to relevant German collections of heraldry.

== Literature ==
- Brigitte English, Erhard Etzlaub's Projection and Methods of Mapping, in: Imago Mundi, 48 (1996), pp. 103–123.
