= Ethiopia – United States Mapping Mission =

Operation undertaken by the United States Army

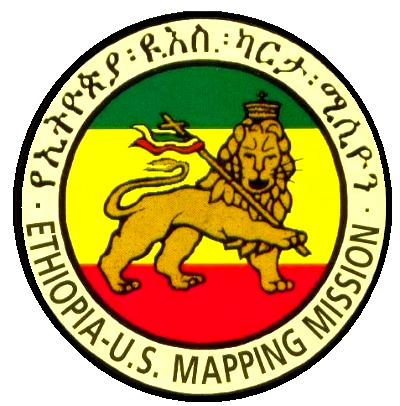
Ethi-U.S. Mapping Mission Logo

The Ethiopia-United States Mapping Mission, also known as the Ethi-U.S. Mapping Mission, was an operation undertaken by the United States Army during the 1960s to provide up-to-date topographic map coverage of the entire country of Ethiopia. The soldiers who conducted the mapping operations on the ground during that time used the latest surveying and mapping techniques and were exposed to many hardships and dangers, but they completed their mission near the end of the decade. The maps that were created still serve as the base maps for the country of Ethiopia and are presently being updated and maintained by the Ethiopian Mapping Authority.

== The mission ==
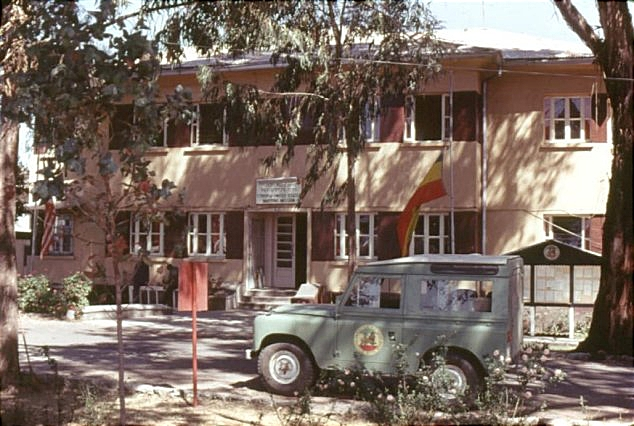
Mapping Mission Headquarters

The Ethiopia-United States Mapping Mission was a mission of the U.S. Army Corps of Engineers, 64th Engineer Battalion, 29th Engineer Company and U.S. Army Map Service, later U.S. Army Topographic Command (TOPOCOM), Special Foreign Activity during the Cold War in the 1960s to survey and map the entire country of Ethiopia, then under the rule of Emperor Haile Selassie I. Aviation support for the Army Map Service was primarily provided by the 572nd Engineer Platoon (Topographic Aviation) and civilian pilots under contract, along with some early support from the U.S. Air Force and Ethiopian Airlines. Battalion Headquarters was located in Leghorn (Livorno), Italy, and the Mapping Mission itself was headquartered in Addis Ababa, the nation's centrally located capital.

== The men ==
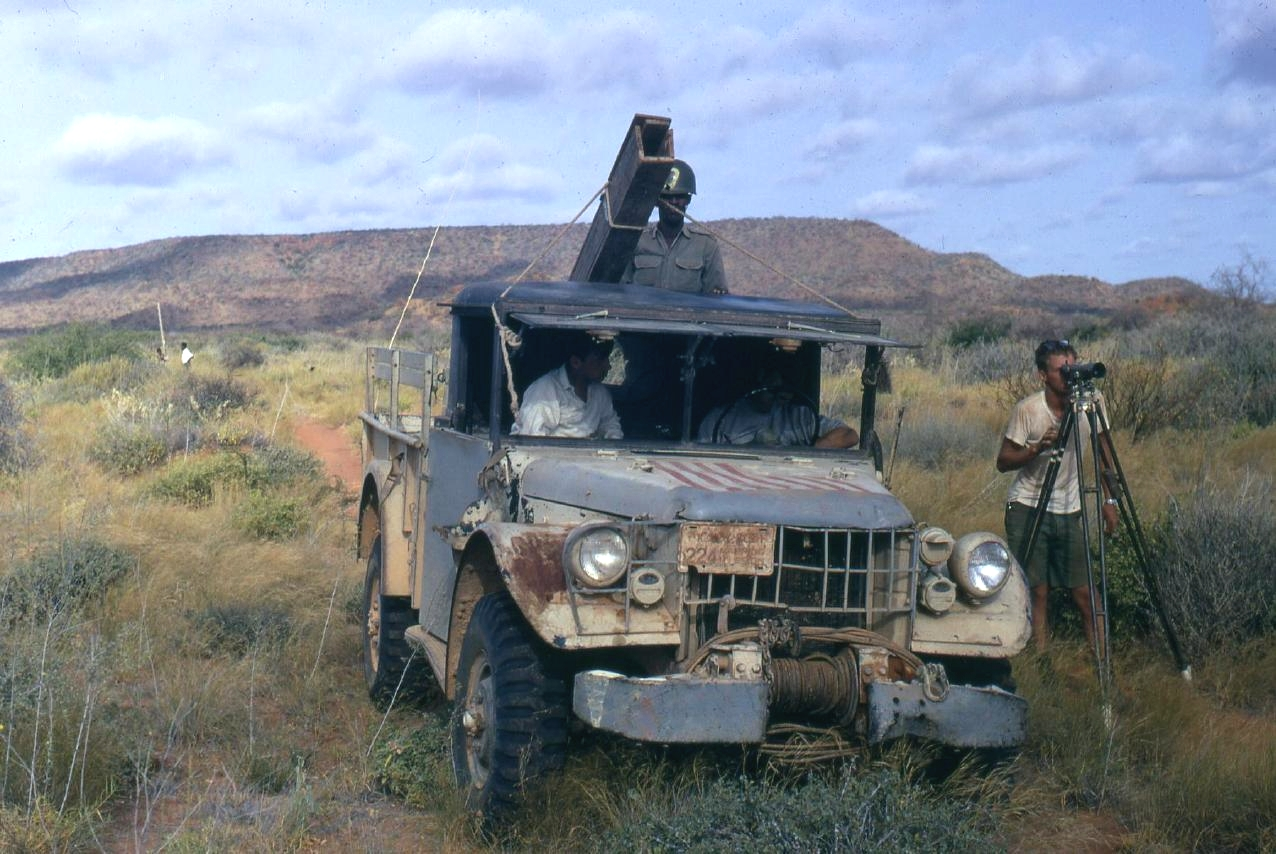
Some areas of the country were accessible by motor vehicles.

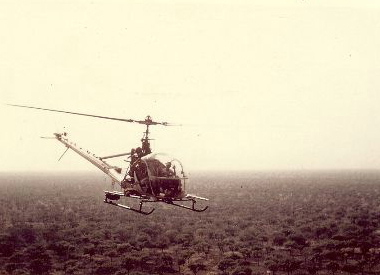
Remote areas required daily helicopter support.

The topographic surveyors and their aviation support pilots and crew served on field parties that endured sweltering heat in this Sub Saharan region of Africa. They also struggled to subsist in remote areas of the country that included jungles, deserts, dense bush, mountains and swamps that harbored deadly snakes, crocodiles, lions, leopards, hyenas, hippos, cape buffalo, elephants, wild dogs, dangerous bees and ants, aggressive tribes of baboons and sometimes hostile natives, not to mention any number of malignant diseases. In addition, these troops and their support personnel were frequently required to conduct their operations in active war zones along the Somalia and Sudan borders, where brutal wars and indiscriminate killing had been going on for years, and the area of the country that is now Eritrea, where the Eritrean Liberation Front was engaged in armed struggle with imperial Ethiopian forces as part of the Eritrean War of Independence. According to a country study commissioned by the U.S. Army, the Eritrean War of Independence began in 1961, and intensified in 1962 in response to Ethiopia dissolving the Eritrean-Ethiopian federation. By 1965, the Ethiopian Army devoted a division to fighting the ELF insurgency, including three battalions to guard cities in Eritrea, and a counterinsurgency battalion focused on direct action. The U.S. State Department also noted the effect of the increased insurgency in March 1965, as the Ethiopian government requested an increase in security assistance aid due to the disruption caused by "Eritrean dissidence."

=== Consequences of armed conflict in Ethiopia ===
In at least one case, a survey team was taken captive by insurgent members of the Eritrean Liberation Front (ELF) in July 1965. The team consisted of CW3 Jack Kalmbach (UH-1 pilot), Specialist 4 Ronald Dolecki (field classifier), and Habte Mesmer (Ethiopian interpreter). The ELF burned the helicopter and marched the captives approximately 150 miles into Sudan. After 12 days, Dolecki successfully escaped, and the other captives were eventually released. The U.S. government characterized the insurgents as "well armed bandits," apparently an attempt to appease the Ethiopian government. As a consequence of the attacks, the Ethiopian Army began escorting the survey teams. This had already been authorized per the 1953 defense installation treaty between the U.S. and Ethiopia, which authorized the mapping survey and allowed "Ethiopian security forces" to accompany the survey teams outside of installations. In October 1965, another survey team was attacked by insurgents, resulting in one Ethiopian soldier wounded and one ELF insurgent killed in action.

== The methods ==
The aerial photography used by the Ethiopia-United States Mapping Mission was flown by the U.S. Air Force, normally at an altitude above 30,000 feet for optimum coverage. The geographic coordinates (latitude and longitude) of the location of the aircraft (and therefore the aerial photo camera station) with respect to known stations on the ground was controlled horizontally by a system known as HIRAN (High Range Navigation Radar), a large and heavy system that required a large aircraft, such as the RB-50. High-quality horizontal geodetic control was established by the topographic surveyors on the bulky HIRAN ground stations by measuring their cardinal direction distances from nearby photo-identifiable points on which the surveyors established horizontal positions using theodolites and electronic distance meters (EDM) and triangulation and traverse techniques.

A device known as a Terrain Profile Recorder (TPR), which used the boiling point of a liquid chemical at a specific altitude and a gyroscopically stabilized radar altimeter was used to determine and maintain the altitude of the aircraft above a known elevation, such as a large body of water, while taking a series of aerial photographs that overlapped in the direction of flight and across flight lines in order to provide stereoscopic photo coverage of the entire area. Strategically located photo-identifiable points were selected in areas of overlap between photo flight lines and elevations were established on these points by the topographic surveyors using differential levelling techniques.

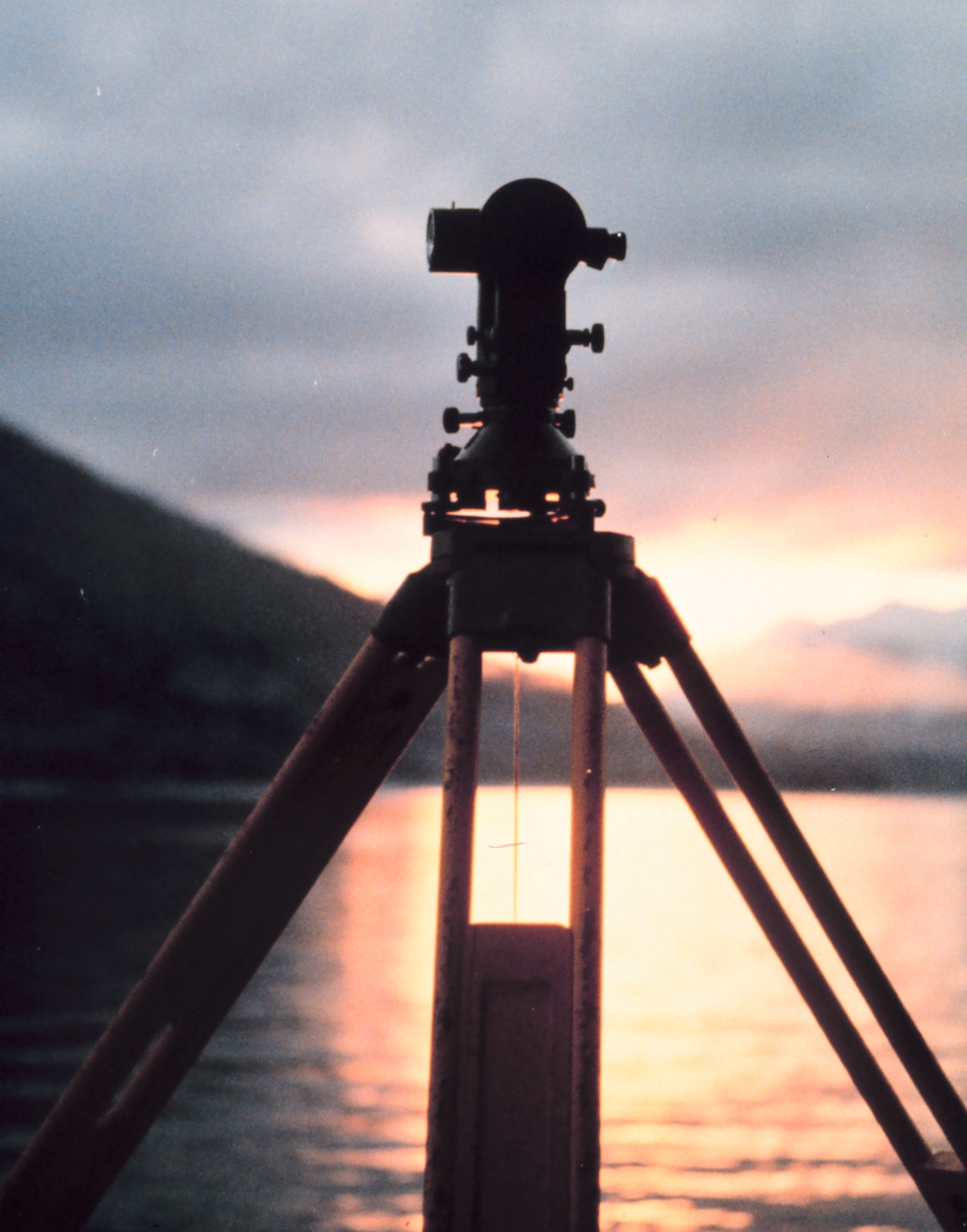
Wild T-2 Theodolite in the Sunset

Geographic coordinates and elevations (representing all three dimensions) were later extended by Army Map Service personnel to other strategically located points on the photos using computers and analytical methods of photogrammetric modeling. These computer-generated photo control points were then used to compile, or draw, the planimetric map to the desired scale and delineate its contours from stereo models of the photos using special stereoscopic mapping equipment. Once the map images were drawn in detail to uniform scale and made into detailed map reproducibles through photographic processes, printing plates were produced and maps were printed in volume on an offset printing press, a fast and efficient process that is still in use today.

Gravimeters, small portable units that provide measurements of the force of gravity, were also used by the surveyors to conduct gravity surveys to further understand the topography of the country and the geodetic datum.

Field classification specialists, soldiers as well as civilians from Army Map Service, were utilized to conduct research on the ground in order to provide names of cities and towns and any other prominent named features, as well as classify types of roads, buildings, hydrographic features such as lakes and rivers, and any other features to be depicted on the maps. Interpreters were used to interview local officials and residents to determine proper names, spelling and usage of features.

== The maps ==
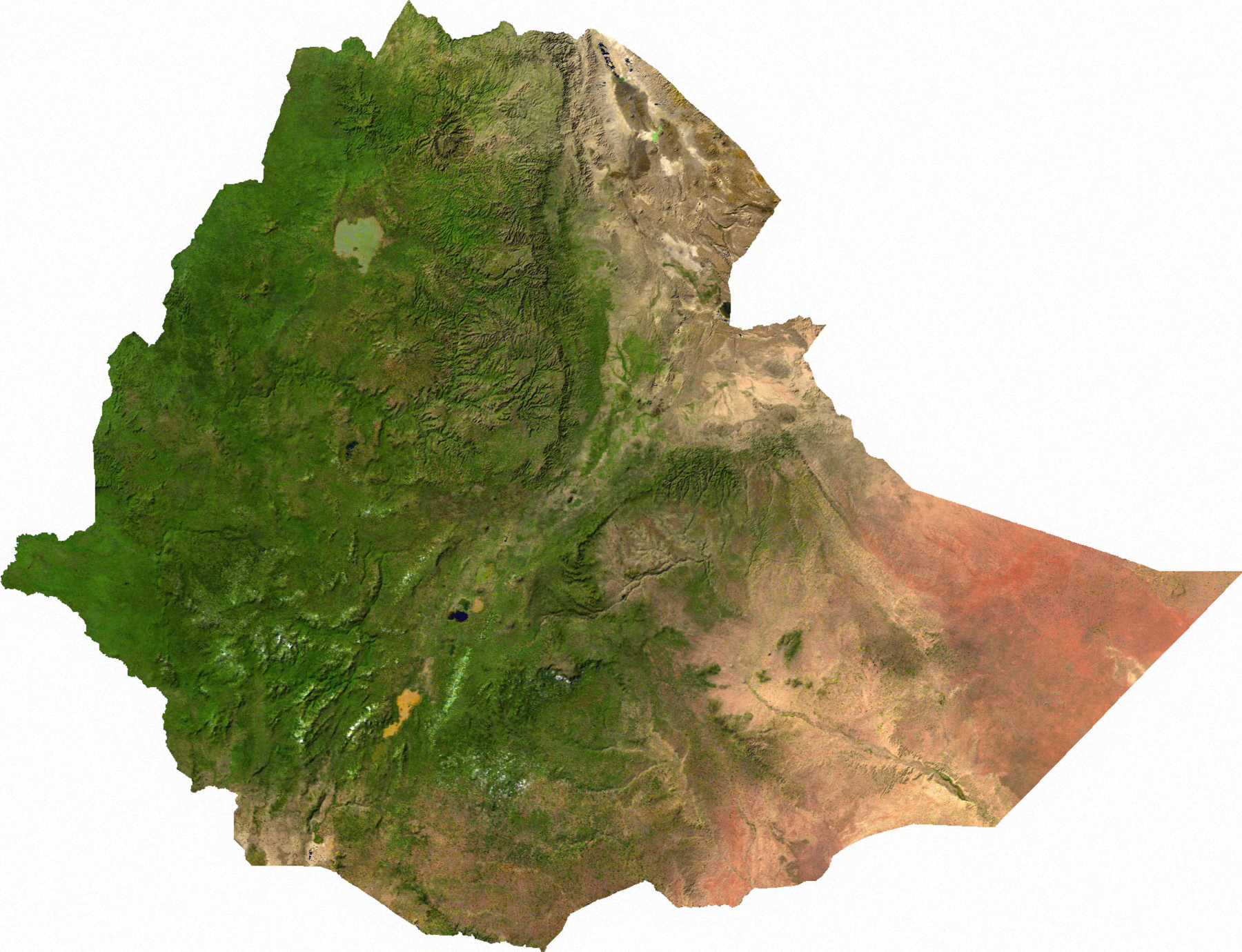
Satellite Map of Ethiopia

The Ethiopia-U.S. Mapping Mission was activated in July 1963 and during its lifespan involved about a thousand U.S. military and civilian personnel. It was closed out in July 1970 after its topographic surveying mission in Ethiopia was complete. Photogrammetric and cartographic map finishing operations based on these surveys were subsequently completed by Army Map Service/TOPOCOM in Bethesda, Maryland. The primary 1:250,000-scale map series and 1:50,000-scale maps of special interest areas that were created as a result of this operation still serve as the base maps for the country of Ethiopia, and are presently being maintained and updated by the Ethiopian Mapping Authority in Addis Ababa.
