= Oblique Mercator projection =

Map projection

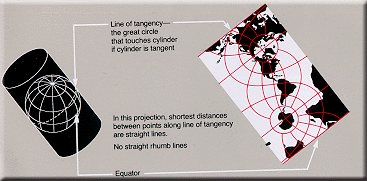
oblique Mercator projection.

The oblique Mercator map projection is an adaptation of the standard Mercator projection. The oblique version is sometimes used in national mapping systems. When paired with a suitable geodetic datum, the oblique Mercator delivers high accuracy in zones less than a few degrees in arbitrary directional extent.

== Standard and oblique aspects ==
Comparison of tangent and secant forms of normal, oblique and transverse Mercator projections with standard parallels in red

The oblique Mercator projection is the oblique aspect of the standard (or Normal) Mercator projection. They share the same underlying mathematical construction and consequently the oblique Mercator inherits many traits from the normal Mercator:

- Both projections are cylindrical: for the normal Mercator, the axis of the cylinder coincides with the polar axis and the line of tangency with the equator. For the transverse Mercator, the axis of the cylinder lies in the equatorial plane, and the line of tangency is any chosen meridian, thereby designated the central meridian.
- Both projections may be modified to secant forms, which means the scale has been reduced so that the cylinder slices through the model globe.
- Both exist in spherical and ellipsoidal versions.
- Both projections are conformal, so that the point scale is independent of direction and local shapes are well preserved;
- Both projections can have constant scale on the line of tangency (the equator for the normal Mercator and the central meridian for the transverse). For the ellipsoidal form, several developments in use do not have constant scale along the line (which is a geodesic) of tangency.

Since the standard great circle of the oblique Mercator can be chosen at will, it may be used to construct highly accurate maps (of narrow width) anywhere on the globe.

== Spherical oblique Mercator ==
In constructing a map on any projection, a sphere is normally chosen to model the Earth when the extent of the mapped region exceeds a few hundred kilometers in length in both dimensions. For maps of smaller regions, an ellipsoidal model must be chosen if greater accuracy is required; see next section.

== Hotine oblique Mercator projection ==
The Hotine oblique Mercator (also known as the rectified skew orthomorphic or 'RSO' projection) projection has approximately constant scale along the geodesic of conceptual tangency. Hotine's work was extended by Engels and Grafarend in 1995 to make the geodesic of conceptual tangency have true scale. The Hotine is the standard map projection used in Brunei, Malaysia, and Singapore. It was developed by Martin Hotine in the 1940s.

== Space-oblique Mercator projection ==
The Space-oblique Mercator projection is a generalization of the oblique Mercator projection to incorporate time evolution of a satellite ground track.

== See also ==
- List of map projections
- Mercator projection
- Transverse Mercator projection
- Space-oblique Mercator projection
- Scale (map)
