= Ethiopian Mapping Agency =

Ethiopian government agency

- የኢትዮጵያ ካርታ ሥራ ኤጀንሲ

Agency overview
- Formed: 1954
- Jurisdiction: Ethiopian government
- Agency executive: Sultan Mohammed, Director General
- Parent department: Ministry of Finance and Cooperation
- Website: www.ema.gov.et

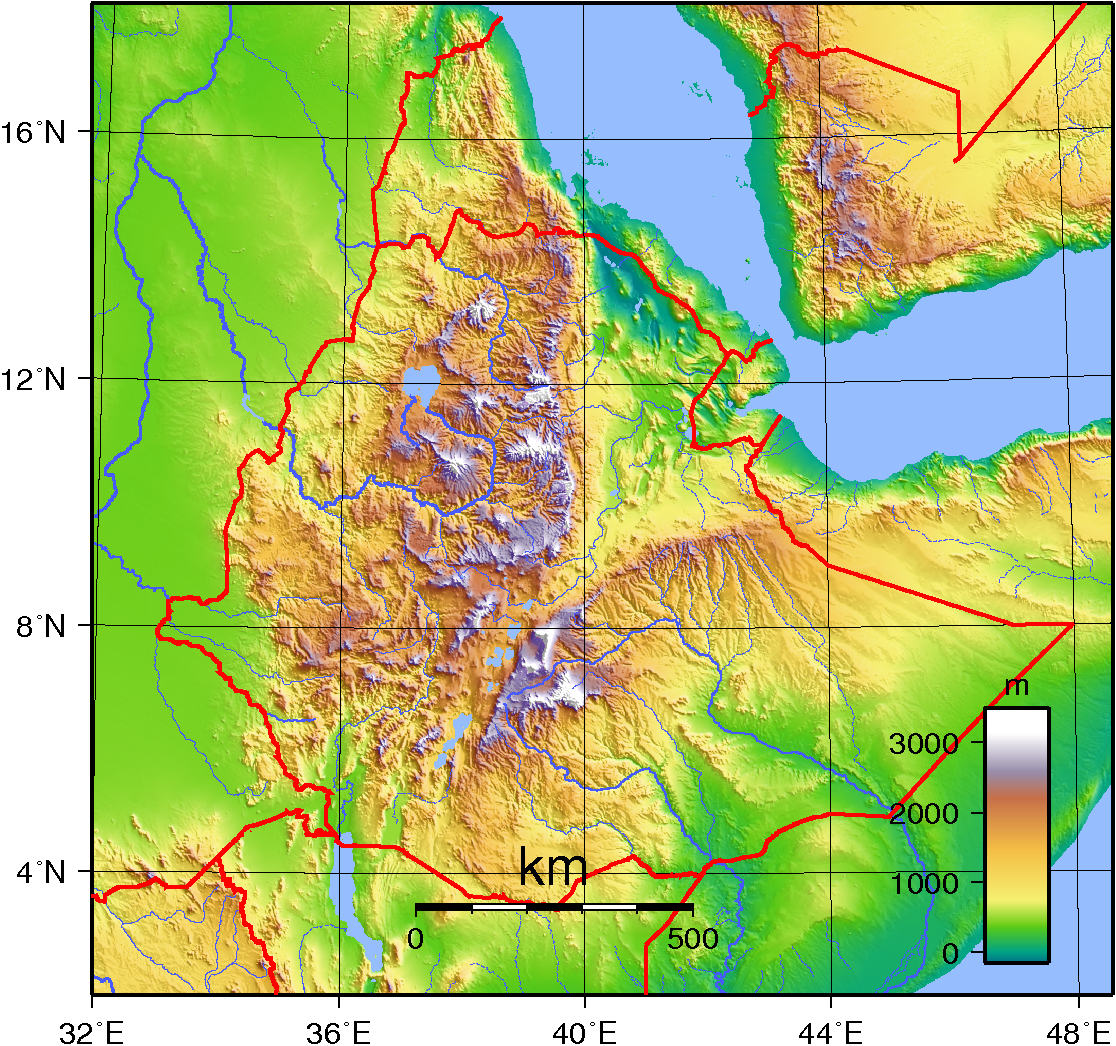
Topographic Map of Ethiopia

The Ethiopian Mapping Agency (EMA) is an Ethiopian government agency, a department within the Ministry of Finance and Cooperation, that is responsible for cartographic mapping and remote sensing activities in Ethiopia. The EMA has expanded its operation to include a comprehensive map revision program in addition to various phases of digital mapping and information technology.

== History ==
=== Origin ===
The Ethiopian Mapping Agency, originally known as the Ethiopian Mapping and Geography Institute, located in Addis Ababa, Ethiopia, is the official organization responsible for mapping, surveying and remote sensing activities in Ethiopia. The organization was established in 1954 under the reign of Emperor Haile Selassie I as a department in the Imperial Ethiopian Ministry of Education. It was initially established to produce graphic materials and geography textbooks for educational purposes. During its early years, the EMA benefited from United States assistance, both in terms of financial assistance from the Point Four Program and a comprehensive base mapping operation of the country undertaken by the United States Army.

=== 1960–1979 ===
The Institute was transferred to the Ministry of Interior in 1960 and expanded its operations to include some basic cartographic activities and extended research. The organisation had benefited from the United States Point Four Programme of financial aid until it was discontinued in 1962, at which time the country entered into an agreement with the United States for the U.S. Army Map Service, later known as Topographic Command (Topocom), to produce base maps of the country. The topographic surveying was provided by soldiers from the 64th Engineer Battalion, 29th Engineer Company, and the project was known as the Ethiopia-United States Mapping Mission. Using the survey data from the Mapping Mission, The Army Map Service/Topocom completed the photogrammetric map compilation and cartographic map finishing operations. The resulting 1:250,000-scale base maps of the country and 1:50,000-scale maps of special interest areas served as the impetus for the Institute to begin its cartographic map maintenance and distribution program. The organization was placed under a Director General with two Directors and seventy employees, and was reorganized into three subdivisions: Photogrammetry, Cartography and Photo Laboratory.

=== 1980–2017 ===
The Institute was reorganized again in 1980 and was renamed the Ethiopian Mapping Agency. As of 2017, the EMA employs about 350 people, engaged in aerial photography, geodetic surveying, photogrammetric, cartographic and photo lab activities to support and maintain its 1:250,000; 1:50,000; 1:1,000,000; 1:2,000,000; National Atlas of Ethiopia and 1:15,000-scale map of Addis Ababa. In addition, it is involved in remote sensing, orthophoto mapping, information technology, digital mapping and land use/land cover (LULC) studies and maintains a library of geoinformation in support of Ethiopia's infrastructure.

=== 2018–present ===
In February 2018, the Ethiopian Mapping Agency's request to be reestablished as the Ethiopian Geospatial Information Agency was approved by the Ethiopian Parliament. The motivation for this change was to modernize the aims of the organization as well as to differentiate themselves from the Information Network Security Agency (INSA) and the Ministry of Urban Development and Housing.
