= Martin Hotine =

British Army officer and surveyor

Brigadier Martin Hotine CMG CBE
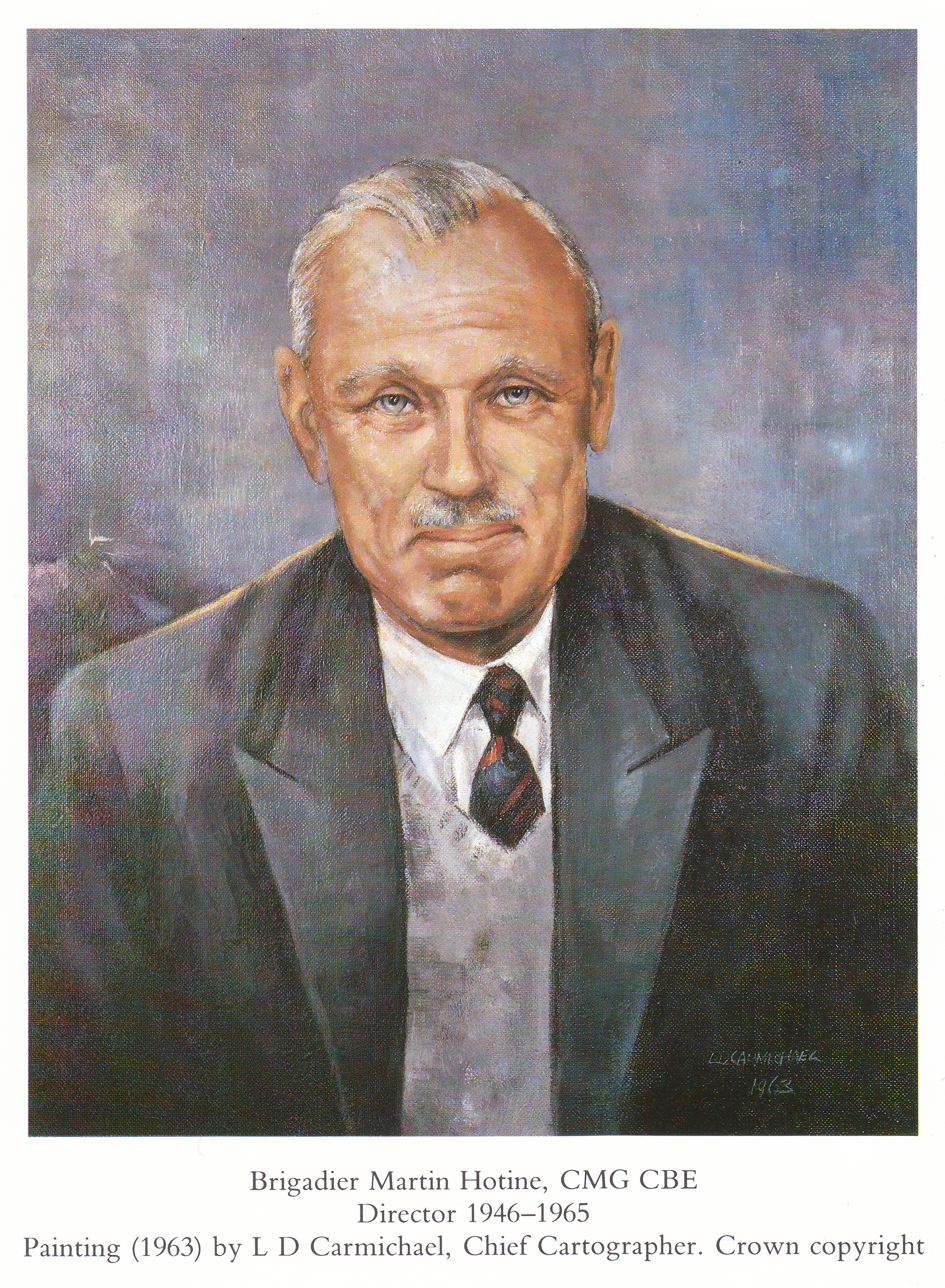
- Born: 17 June 1898; Wandsworth, London
- Died: 12 November 1968 (aged 70); Surrey, England
- Resting place: Municipal Cemetery, Weybridge, Surrey, England; 51.366442°N 0.465578°W
- Education: Southend Technical School; Royal Military Academy, Woolwich; Magdalene College, Cambridge
- Known for: Founder and first Director General of the Directorate of Overseas Surveys
- Spouse: Kate Amelia Hotine (1895–1987)

Brigadier Martin Hotine CMG CBE (17 June 1898 – 12 November 1968) was the head of the Trigonometrical and Levelling Division of the Ordnance Survey responsible for the 26-year-long retriangulation of Great Britain (1936–1962) and was the first Director General of the Directorate of Overseas Surveys (1946–1955).

He was commissioned as a Royal Engineers officer in 1917 and served on the North-West Frontier during the First World War and later in the Persian and Mesopotamian campaigns. He has been described as "decisive, ingenious and tough".

== Cartography ==
Hotine was responsible for the design of the triangulation pillars constructed during the Geodetic resurvey of Britain. 6,173 of these were built. They provided a solid base for the theodolites used by the survey teams during the survey, thereby improving the accuracy of the readings obtained. They are sometimes referred to as "Hotine Pillars".

In the 1940s, Hotine developed a map projection for the Malay Peninsula and Borneo that is known as the Hotine oblique Mercator projection.

== Personal life ==
Hotine was married to Kate Amelia Hotine (née Pearson)(1895–1987) whose nickname to family and friends was 'Ajax'.

== Honours ==
Martin Hotine was awarded the CBE in 1945, and the CMG in 1949.

- In 1947 he became an officer of the United States Legion of Merit.
- 1947 Royal Geographical Society Founder's Medal "For research work in Air Survey ... and for his cartographic work."
- 1955 Photogrammetric Society's first President's Medal
- 1964 The Institution of Royal Engineers' Gold Medal
- In 1968 he was awarded the United States Department of Commerce Gold Medal.

== Publications ==
- Hotine, Martin (1931), Surveying from air photographs, Professional Papers of the Air Survey Committee – No. 3, London: His Majesty's Stationery Office, p. 71
- Hotine, Martin (1931), The Fourcade Stereogoniometer, Professional Papers of the Air Survey Committee – No. 7, London: His Majesty's Stationery Office, OCLC 184739773
- Hotine, Martin, Mathematical geodesy

== See also ==
- Hotine Glacier
