= Klaudyán map of Bohemia =

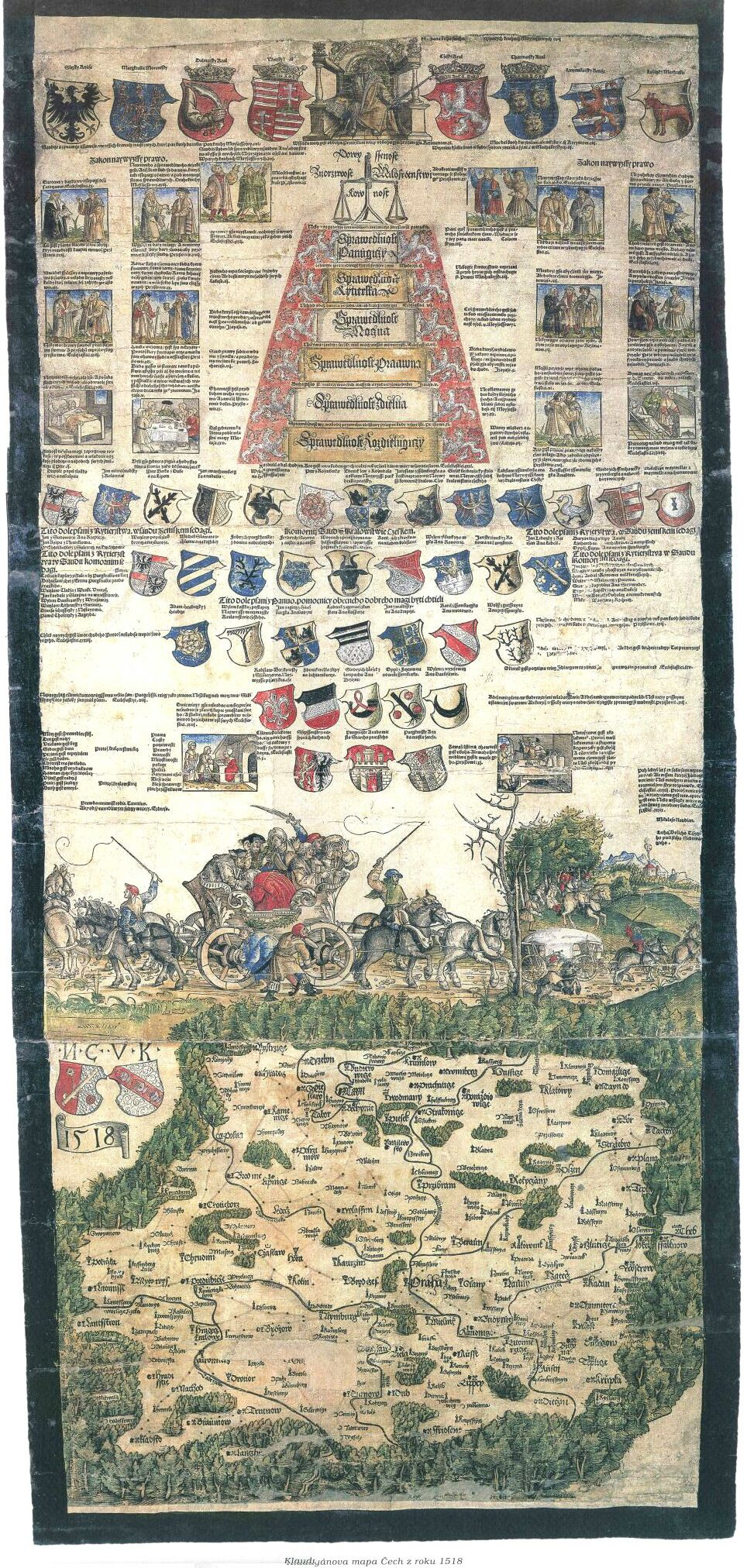

Klaudyán map (1518) (Czech: Klaudiánova mapa) is the earliest map of Bohemia (and earliest map to cover a country‘s area on a one sheet map ever). It was printed by Mikuláš Klaudyán, a printer from Mladá Boleslav. The ratio scale is 1:685000.

== Description ==
The upper part consists of the picture of the King Louis II of Hungary and Bohemia with the emblems of his lands, the allegory of justice, coats of arms of highest Czech dignities and three important royal cities - Prague, Kutná Hora and Žatec. In the middle of the map sheet is a picture symbolizing Czech religious disunion - a carriage drawn by horse couples to opposite directions. The map itself, which is south-up, records about 280 towns and castles, and depicts also forests, mountains, rivers and roads.
