= Alden Partridge Colvocoresses =

Cartographer and US Army officer (1918–2007)

- Born: September 23, 1918; Humboldt, Arizona, U.S.
- Died: March 27, 2007 (aged 88); Falls Church, Virginia, U.S.
- Burial place: Arlington National Cemetery
- Military career
- Allegiance: United States
- Branch: United States Army
- Rank: Colonel
- Unit: 1st Armored Division
- Wars: World War II; Tunisia Campaign; Operation Overlord; Korean War; Vietnam War
- Awards: Silver Star (2); Purple Heart

Alden Partridge Colvocoresses (September 23, 1918 – March 27, 2007) helped to develop the Space-oblique Mercator projection with John P. Snyder and John Junkins, and developed the first satellite map of the United States in 1974.

== Biography ==
=== Early life ===
Colvocoresses was born in 1918 to George M. Colvocoresses II and Alice Hagen, in Humboldt, Arizona. He is the grandson of George Partridge Colvocoresses and the great-grandson of George Colvocoresses.

=== Army career ===
Colvocoresses served in the U.S. Army in World War II, in the 16th Armored Engineer Battalion of the 1st Armored Division, in North Africa and Europe. He was twice wounded in combat, receiving the Purple Heart. Colvocoresses was also twice awarded the Silver Star for valor: once, for capturing a German tank in Tunisia; and again, for escaping his Italian captors in North Africa.

He became involved with aerial photo mapping for the 1st Army, where he oversaw some of the photo mapping as preparation for the Normandy landings. He also served in the Korean War, and retired after playing a large role in mapping operations during the Vietnam War.

=== Later life ===
Colvocoresses spent the rest of his career working for the U.S. Geological Survey's national mapping division, retiring in 1990. He was a research cartographer on the Landsat satellite program and received two patents for models of remote sensing systems. Alden helped to develop the first satellite map of the United States.

He died on March 27, 2007. He is buried at Arlington National Cemetery.
