= Charles H. Ruth =

American military officer

Charles H. Ruth (1889–1949) was considered the founding father of the Army Map Service. Ruth was first commanding officer of the Army Engineer Reproduction Plant (ERP). Prior to 1917 the Army Corps of Engineers compiled and drafted maps. Reproduction was accomplished by the Department of the Interior or commercial facilities. The ERP was the predecessor organization to the Army Map Service, Army Topographic Command, Defense Mapping Agency and now National Geospatial-Intelligence Agency.

Before 1917, there was little concern or interest in the United States for maps of foreign countries. In 1917 America entered into World War I as a major ally in Europe. During the course of the conflict, the ERP produced some nine million maps. It was because of Captain Ruth's initial direction that the ERP became one of the major military topographic organizations in the world. Captain Ruth left the Army in 1919 and joined the Washington Evening Star newspaper staff in Washington DC.

In 1942 the ERP was moved from Fort McNair in Washington DC to Brookmont, MD. It was later redesigned as the Army Map Service. Captain Ruth died in 1949. Building #1 of the AMS was dedicated as the Ruth Building in 1953.
