= Mikuláš Klaudyán =

Czech cartographer and doctor

Mikuláš Klaudyán (died 1521/1522) was a physician and scholar in Mladá Boleslav, Bohemia and member of the Unity of the Brethren. He printed the oldest map of Bohemia (1518). He was in close contact with printers in Nürnberg.
