= Space-oblique Mercator projection =

Map projection

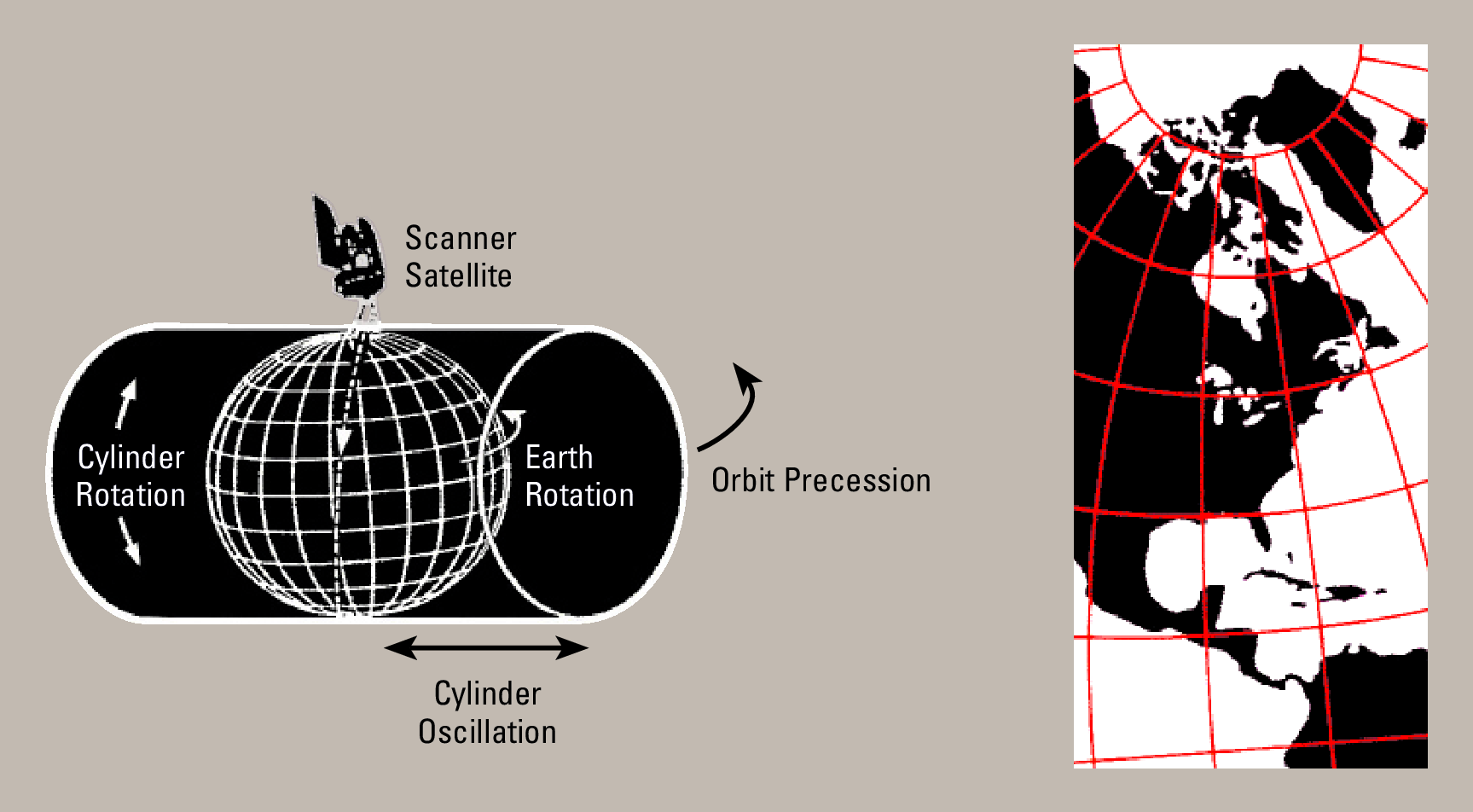
Space-oblique Mercator projection

Space-oblique Mercator projection is a map projection devised in the 1970s for preparing maps from Earth-survey satellite data. It is a generalization of the oblique Mercator projection that incorporates the time evolution of a given satellite ground track to optimize its representation on the map. The oblique Mercator projection, on the other hand, optimizes for a given geodesic.

== History ==
The space-oblique Mercator projection (SOM) was developed by John P. Snyder, Alden Partridge Colvocoresses and John L. Junkins in 1976. Snyder had an interest in maps dating back to his childhood; he regularly attended cartography conferences whilst on vacation. In 1972, the United States Geological Survey (USGS) needed to develop a system for reducing the amount of distortion caused when satellite pictures of the ellipsoidal Earth were printed on a flat page. Colvocoresses, the head of the USGS's national mapping program, asked attendees of a geodetic sciences conferences for help solving the projection problem in 1976. Snyder work on the problem with his newly purchased pocket calculator and devised the mathematical formulas needed to solve the problem. After submitting his calculations to Waldo Tobler for review, Snyder submitted these to the USGS at no charge. Impressed with his work, USGS officials offered Snyder a job, and he promptly accepted. His formulas were then used to produce maps from Landsat 4, which launched in the summer of 1978 .

== Projection description ==
The space-oblique Mercator projection provides continual, nearly conformal mapping of the swath sensed by a satellite. Scale is true along the ground track, varying 0.01 percent within the normal sensing range of the satellite. Conformality is correct within a few parts per million for the sensing range. Distortion is essentially constant along lines of constant distance parallel to the ground track. The space-oblique Mercator is the only projection which takes the rotation of Earth into account.

== Equations ==
The forward equations for the Space-oblique Mercator projection for the sphere are as follows:

$$\begin{align}
\frac{x}{R} &= \int_{0}^{\lambda'} \frac{H-S^2}{\sqrt{1+S^2}}d\lambda' - \frac{S}{\sqrt{1+S^2}}\ln\tan\left(\frac{\pi}{4}+\frac{\varphi'}{2}\right) \\
\frac{y}{R} &= \left(H+1\right) \int_{0}^{\lambda'} \frac{S}{\sqrt{1+S^2}}d\lambda' + \frac{1}{\sqrt{1+S^2}}\ln\tan\left(\frac{\pi}{4}+\frac{\varphi'}{2}\right) \\
S &= \tfrac{P_{2}}{P_{1}} \sin i \cos \lambda' \\
H &= 1 - \tfrac{P_{2}}{P_{1}} \cos i \\
\tan\lambda' &= \cos i \tan \lambda_{t} + \frac{\sin i \tan \varphi }{ \cos \lambda_{t}} \\
\sin\varphi' &= \cos i \sin \varphi - \sin i \cos \varphi \sin \lambda_{t} \\
\lambda_{t} &= \lambda + \tfrac{P_{2}}{P_{1}} \lambda'. \\
\varphi &= \text{geodetic (or geographic) latitude.} \\
\lambda &= \text{geodetic (or geographic) longitude.} \\
P_{2} &= \text{time required for revolution of satellite.} \\
P_{1} &= \text{length of Earth rotation.} \\
i &= \text{angle of inclination.} \\
R &= \text{radius of Earth.} \\
x,y &= \text{rectangular map coordinates.}
\end{align}$$
