= John P. Snyder =

American cartographer (1926–1997)

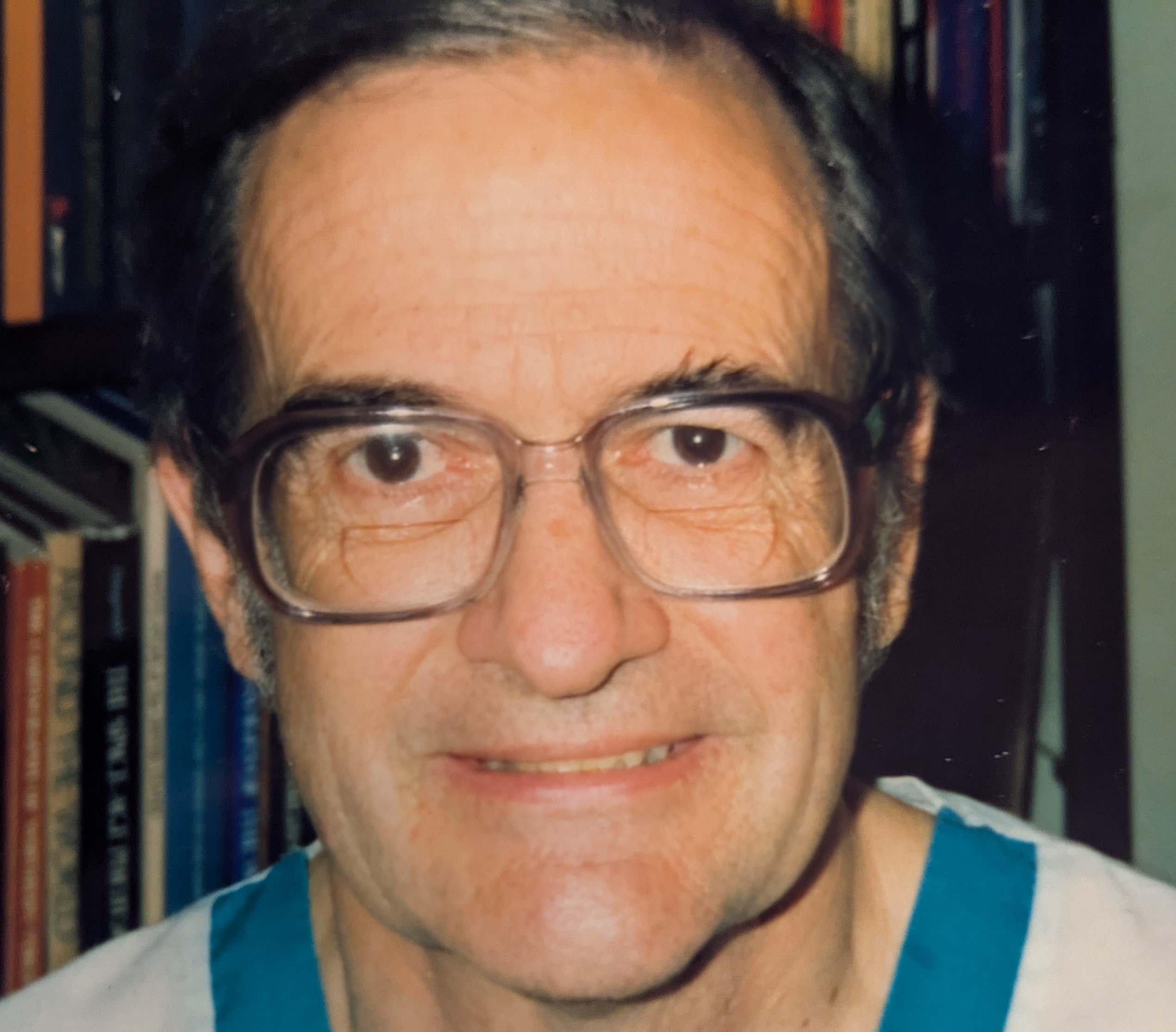
John P. Snyder, Cartographer

John Parr Snyder (12 April 1926 – 28 April 1997) was an American cartographer most known for his work on map projections for the United States Geological Survey (USGS). Educated at Purdue and MIT as a chemical engineer, he had a lifetime interest in map projections as a hobby, but found the calculations tedious without the benefit of expensive calculators or computers. At a cartography conference in 1976, he learned of the need for a map projection that would suit the special needs of Landsat satellite imagery. He had recently been able to purchase a pocket calculator (TI-59) of his own and set to work creating what became known as the space-oblique mercator projection, which he provided to the USGS at no charge. Library of Congress historian John Hessler stated it is "perhaps the most complex map projection".

He was subsequently offered a job within the USGS within two years, where his work apparently led him to the eventual publication of the definitive technical guide to map projections entitled Map Projections: A Working Manual among other works. He also authored Flattening the Earth: Two Thousand Years of Map Projections which details the historical development of hundreds of map projections. Snyder developed at least one other projection, called GS50, which uses a complex polynomial to project the 50 U.S. states with minimal distortion. He taught courses on map projection at George Mason University. He was president of the American Cartographic Association (now CaGIS) from 1990–1991 and also served as a secretary to the Washington Map Society.

In the 1990s he developed "An Equal-Area Map Projection for Polyhedral Globes", that, in the 2000s it became the most often applied to a polyhedral globe. It was later named Snyder equal-area projection in his honor; as was the ISEA model (Icosahedral Snyder Equal Area), important example of modern ISO 19170-1:2021 compliant projection.

John Snyder died April 28, 1997.

== Publications ==
- An album of map projections. USGS Professional Paper No. 1453. 1989.
- Bibliography of map projections. USGS Bulletin No. 1856. 1988.
- Map Projections: A Working Manual USGS Professional Paper 1395. 1987.
- Map projections used for large-scale quadrangles by the U.S. Geological Survey. USGS Circular No. 982. 1986.
- Space Oblique Mercator projection mathematical development. USGS Bulletin No. 1518. 1981.
- Snyder, John P. (1993). Flattening the earth: two thousand years of map projections. University of Chicago Press. ISBN 0226767477.
- Yang, Qihe; Snyder, John P. (1999). Map Projection Transformation: Principles and Applications. CRC Press. ISBN 0748406689.
- Snyder, John P. (2007). "Map projections in the Renaissance". In David Woodward (ed.). Cartography in the European Renaissance. The History of Cartography. Vol. 3. University Of Chicago Press. pp. 365–381. ISBN 978-0226907338.

== See also ==
- Snyder equal-area projection
