= Diego Garcia =

Atoll in the Chagos Archipelago, Indian Ocean

- Diego Garcia seen by the Sentinel-2 satellite, March 2021

- Location within Indian Ocean
- Interactive map of Diego Garcia

Geography
- Location: Central Indian Ocean
- Coordinates: 7°18′48″S 72°24′40″E
- Archipelago: Chagos Archipelago
- Area: 30 km^{2} (12 sq mi) (Note: Land area about 30 km^{2} and total area, including the lagoon, 170 km^{2}, according to the survey of 1967. Other estimates of the land area range from 27.2 to 44 km^{2}; see § Atoll and islets.)
- Highest elevation: 9 m (30 ft) (Note: Gilbert Bourne put the highest point of the atoll at 30 ft (9 m) in 1888; Edis gives a maximum natural elevation of about 25 ft (7.6 m) in dunes near Pointe Marianne; and the World Factbook gives the highest point of the territory as "ocean-side dunes on Diego Garcia 9 m".)
- Highest point: Seaward dunes

Administration
- United Kingdom
- Overseas territory: British Indian Ocean Territory
- Mauritius
- Status: Claimed (Note: Mauritius claims the whole Chagos Archipelago, including Diego Garcia. Under a treaty signed on 22 May 2025, which had not entered into force by November 2026, the United Kingdom would recognise Mauritian sovereignty and exercise sovereign rights over Diego Garcia for an initial 99 years.)

Demographics
- Population: Around 2,000 (no permanent inhabitants)

Additional information
- Time zone: UTC+6

Ramsar Wetland
- Designated: 4 July 2001
- Reference no.: 1077

Diego Garcia (/diˈeɪ.ɡoʊ ɡɑːrˈsiːə/) is a coral atoll in the central Indian Ocean, the largest and southernmost of the atolls of the Chagos Archipelago. Its nearly continuous, V-shaped rim of land, about 64 kilometres (40 mi) long, almost encloses a lagoon of 124 square kilometres (48 sq mi) and holds more than half of the archipelago's land. Administered by the United Kingdom as part of the British Indian Ocean Territory (BIOT), and claimed by Mauritius, it is the site of a joint British–American military base, Naval Support Facility Diego Garcia; it has no permanent inhabitants, and around 2,000 military personnel, officials and contractors are ordinarily present.

Known to Portuguese navigators from the early 16th century and claimed by France from 1769, the atoll was settled from the 1780s by planters from Île de France (Mauritius) with enslaved workers brought mainly from Madagascar and Mozambique. It passed to Britain with Mauritius in 1810–1814, and for 150 years its plantations at East Point, Pointe Marianne and Minni Minni produced coconut oil and copra; it was briefly a coaling station in the 1880s and a flying-boat base in the Second World War. The descendants of the plantation workers formed a community known as the Ilois, now generally called Chagossians.

In 1965 the United Kingdom detached the archipelago from Mauritius to form the BIOT and, under the 1966 UK–US exchange of notes, made it available for the defence purposes of both governments. The inhabitants of Diego Garcia were removed in 1971, and the rest of the archipelago was emptied by 1973 (see Expulsion of the Chagossians). An American naval communications station built from 1971 was expanded under the Diego Garcia Agreement 1976 into a naval support facility, which has since been used for operations in the Gulf, Iraq and Afghanistan; in 2008 the British government acknowledged that the island had been used for two American extraordinary rendition flights in 2002.

The atoll is at the centre of the Chagos Archipelago sovereignty dispute: in 2019 the International Court of Justice advised that the United Kingdom should end its administration of the archipelago "as rapidly as possible". Under the treaty signed on 22 May 2025, the United Kingdom would accept that "Mauritius is sovereign over the Chagos Archipelago in its entirety, including Diego Garcia", and Mauritius would authorise it to exercise sovereign rights over Diego Garcia for an initial 99 years. After the position of the US president, Donald Trump, changed in 2026, the British government said that it could not ratify the treaty without American support, and as of November 2026 it had not entered into force. In March 2026, during the war between the United States, Israel and Iran, two Iranian ballistic missiles were launched towards the island; according to the British Defence Secretary, neither got close to it.

== Names ==
French plan of Diego Garcia by La Fontaine, capitaine de brûlot, 1770, the year in which he made the first survey of the lagoon

The origin of the name is uncertain. The former BIOT Commissioner Richard Edis mentioned a possible combination of the names of two Portuguese fleet commanders, Diego Lopes and Garcia de Noronha, and an account of a visit by a Spanish navigator named Diego Garcia in 1532, but regarded any explanation as speculation; early maps used other names, such as Don Garzia, and the present name became definitive only in the late 18th century. Mauritius's pleadings attribute the discovery of the archipelago to Diego García de Moguer. Edis thought that the Portuguese discoverer of the archipelago was probably Pedro Mascarenhas.

Visitors have compared the shape of the atoll to "a serpent bent double", in the words of the 19th-century Mauritian historian Charles Grant, and to a horseshoe, and its late-20th-century American residents to a footprint in the sand, with the islets at the mouth of the lagoon forming the toes. The United States Navy calls the island the "Footprint of Freedom". The people born in the archipelago came to call themselves Ilois, "islanders". Places on the atoll keep plantation-era names such as East Point, Pointe Marianne, Minni Minni and Barachois Sylvain, and at Cannon Point two six-inch guns have pointed out to sea since 1942. According to Edis, the names of Eclipse and Observatory Points, at the lagoon entrance, probably come from the observation of an eclipse of Jupiter's moons by the surveyor Archibald Blair in 1786.

== Geography ==
Map of Diego Garcia

=== Location ===
Diego Garcia lies in the south-east of the Chagos Archipelago, on the Chagos–Laccadive Ridge, a volcanic ridge that continues northwards through the Maldives and Lakshadweep. It is the southernmost of the archipelago's five atolls with islands, the others being Peros Banhos, the Salomon Islands, the Great Chagos Bank and the Egmont Islands. According to the United Kingdom, the atoll is 690 nautical miles (1,280 km) from Malé, 962 nautical miles from Agaléga, the nearest Mauritian territory, 970 from Colombo and 1,140 from Port Louis.

=== Atoll and islets ===
The atoll has a total area of about 170 square kilometres (66 sq mi), of which the lagoon occupies 124 square kilometres (48 sq mi) and the land about 30 square kilometres (12 sq mi). (Note: Estimates of the land area differ: 30 km^{2} in the 1967 survey; 29.17 km^{2} in the geographic-information-system estimate of Dumbraveanu and Sheppard; 27.2 km^{2} in Mauritius's pleadings; and 44 km^{2} according to the BIOT Administration and the World Factbook.) It has a dry-land rim that stretches about 64 kilometres (40 mi) from end to end, which the US Navy describes as "one of the most continuous land rims of any atoll in the world", broken only by a pass about 6 kilometres (4 mi) wide at the northern end. The rim varies from a few hundred metres to about 2.4 kilometres (1.5 mi) in width, being widest at the north-west, where the main settlement lies. The geographer David Stoddart, who studied it in 1967, described it as a typical mid-ocean atoll on a subsiding volcanic foundation.

West Island, one of the three islets in the lagoon entrance, 2005

Three islets lie in the lagoon entrance: West Island, Middle Island and East Island, the largest. (Note: Stoddart gives areas of 3.4 ha for West Island, about 6 ha for Middle Island and 11.75 ha for East Island; the US Navy's natural resources plan of 2005 gives 2.0, 4.98 and 7.49 ha.) A fourth, Anniversary Island, a sand cay at the north-western end of Spur Reef, was named in November 1990 for the territory's 25th anniversary. The seaward reef flats are generally 50–250 m wide and mostly remain slightly submerged even at low spring tides; beyond them the outer slope drops steeply, to more than 450 m within about a kilometre of the shore in places.

=== Lagoon ===
Map of Diego Garcia with lagoon depths in fathoms, after Gilbert Bourne, published in 1903

The lagoon is about 21 km long and up to 11 km wide. For an atoll of its size it is shallow, with a maximum depth of 31 m in the survey made by HMS Vidal in 1967, and it is divided into three basins. (Note: The US Navy's natural resources plan gives depths "ranging down to 80 feet (25 m)".) Knolls rise from its floor, but almost none of them reaches the surface outside the 10 m line, and Stoddart judged that Diego Garcia "must be almost unique among atolls in the absence of surface patch reefs in the lagoon". The lagoon opens to the sea only through three passes in the north, Main Pass, Middle Pass and Barton Pass, of which Main Pass, the westernmost, is the widest and deepest.

In the south the lagoon shore is deeply indented by barachois, inlets with narrow mouths that open into wide intertidal flats; the largest are Barachois Sylvain, about 2 km long, and Barachois Maurice, about 4 km long. The northern part of the lagoon has been altered by the dredging of an anchorage, a turning basin and an access channel 13.6 m deep for the military facility, and Hamylton and East estimated that about 0.55 km^{3} of sediment had been removed from the north-west of the lagoon between 1967 and 1998.

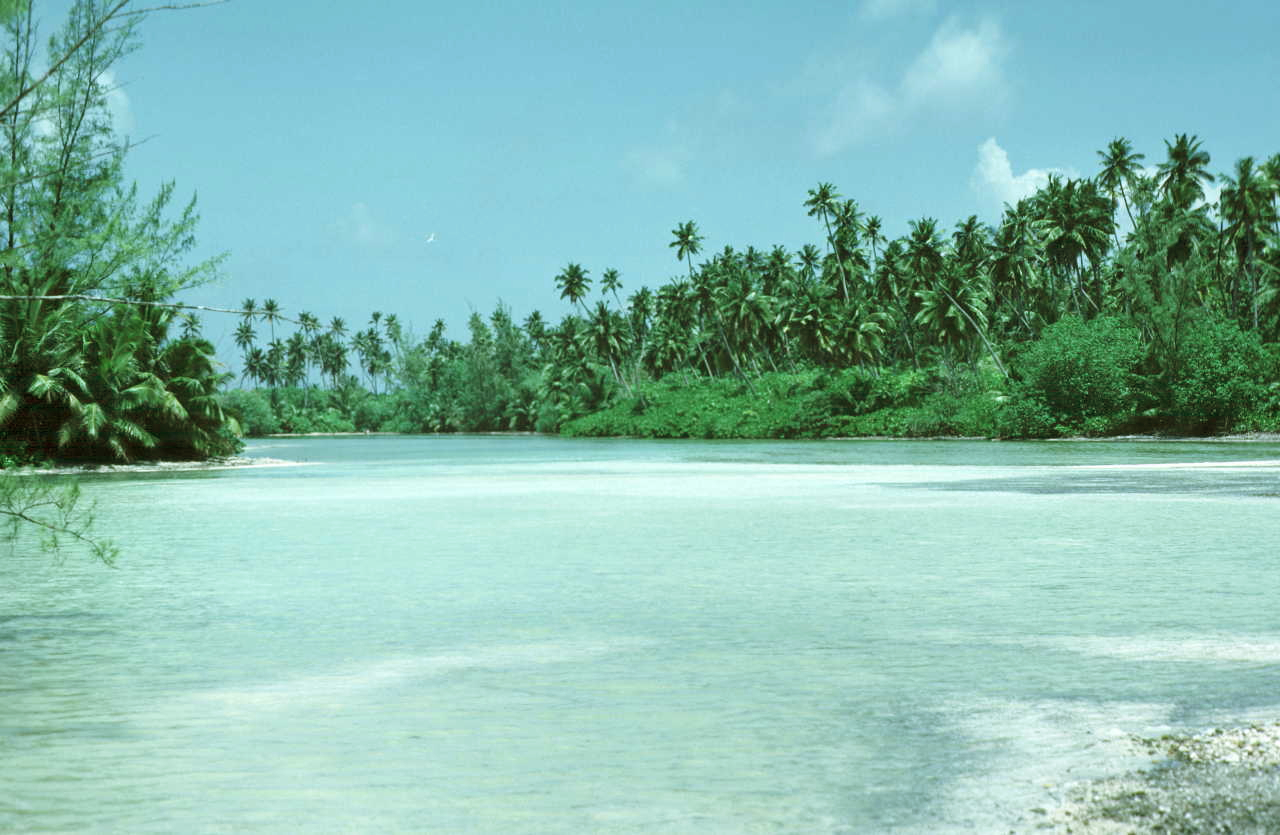
Barachois Maurice, a large area of shallows on the lagoon side of the atoll, 1982

=== Elevation, soils and fresh water ===
Most of the land is only 1–1.5 m above sea level. The highest ground is on the ocean side, where coastal dunes have formed along about 17 km of shore; Stoddart levelled the dunes at Pointe Marianne at almost 7 m above low water, and the US Navy gives dune heights of 4.5–9 m. Much of the eastern arm is so narrow and low that it floods extensively at high spring tides. The sediments are almost entirely calcium carbonate, with fragments of pumice, and a dark-brown peaty loam a few inches deep has formed on the higher and older parts of the atoll.

In 1770 the French officer La Fontaine reported that the island was "not provided with fresh water", but beneath the wider parts of the rim lie lenses of fresh water that float on the denser seawater and are recharged by rain; shallow wells tap them readily. The base's water system has drawn on the lenses since 1978, about 90 per cent of its supply coming in 2005 from the well field near the cantonment, and in the late 1990s 102 wells in five production areas yielded about 1 million US gallons (3,800 m^{3}) a day, the pumping rates being adjusted to keep the chloride content acceptable. The lenses are vulnerable to salt-water intrusion and pollution: use of the airfield well field was suspended after a fuel spill in 1991. A few freshwater marshes recharge the lenses, notably in the receiver antenna field in the north and near the Pointe Marianne cemetery, where the marsh is noted for its ferns, aquatic plants, fish and eels.

=== Coastal change ===
Comparing Stoddart's map of 1967 with satellite images of 2005, Hamylton and East found that 26 of 69 transects across the rim had eroded and 43 had accreted, much of the accretion being the building out of the lagoon shore for the airbase, which had added an estimated 3.01 km^{2} of land. Charles Sheppard disputed the findings, pointing to increasing inundation of the low south-east of the atoll and to the cost of hardening parts of the shoreline of the base. In 2025 the territory's Chief Scientific Adviser reported that Diego Garcia risked a breach of its southern narrows.

=== Climate ===
A tropical cyclone south of Diego Garcia on 23 January 2003, seen by NASA's Aqua satellite

Diego Garcia has a hot, humid and very wet climate, with a mean temperature of about 27 °C in every month and relative humidity averaging about 79 per cent. The seasons are governed by the north–south migration of a zone of equatorial westerlies between the north-east and south-east trade winds: winds are variable but mainly westerly from December to March, April and May are a transition, the south-east trades blow steadily from June to September, and October and November form a second transition. Winds of more than 40 knots are unusual.

Mean annual rainfall was 2,599 mm in the records for 1937–38 and 1951–66, with annual totals ranging from 1,465 to 3,805 mm; rain is heaviest in January, February and October, and monthly falls average less than 200 mm only during the trades, from April to August. Because of the low latitude, tropical cyclones are rare; according to the Mauritius meteorological service, a cyclone of moderate strength passed just south of the atoll on 16–17 September 1944 and destroyed two Catalina flying boats. The US Navy notes that cyclones seldom pass close to Diego Garcia, because many form near it and then move away.

Climate data for Diego Garcia (1951–1993)
Month	Jan	Feb	Mar	Apr	May	Jun	Jul	Aug	Sep	Oct	Nov	Dec	Year
Record high °C (°F)	33.9 (93.0)	33.9 (93.0)	35.0 (95.0)	35.0 (95.0)	32.9 (91.2)	35.0 (95.0)	32.2 (90.0)	32.2 (90.0)	32.2 (90.0)	32.0 (89.6)	32.7 (90.9)	33.3 (91.9)	35.0 (95.0)
Mean daily maximum °C (°F)	29.8 (85.6)	30.3 (86.5)	30.9 (87.6)	30.9 (87.6)	30.2 (86.4)	29.4 (84.9)	28.7 (83.7)	28.7 (83.7)	29.0 (84.2)	29.4 (84.9)	29.8 (85.6)	30.1 (86.2)	29.7 (85.5)
Daily mean °C (°F)	27.1 (80.8)	27.4 (81.3)	27.6 (81.7)	27.8 (82.0)	27.5 (81.5)	26.8 (80.2)	26.3 (79.3)	26.1 (79.0)	26.4 (79.5)	26.7 (80.1)	27.0 (80.6)	27.2 (81.0)	27.0 (80.6)
Mean daily minimum °C (°F)	24.7 (76.5)	25.0 (77.0)	25.4 (77.7)	25.7 (78.3)	25.4 (77.7)	24.7 (76.5)	24.2 (75.6)	24.1 (75.4)	24.2 (75.6)	24.3 (75.7)	24.7 (76.5)	24.8 (76.6)	24.8 (76.6)
Record low °C (°F)	21.1 (70.0)	21.1 (70.0)	20.0 (68.0)	21.1 (70.0)	19.4 (66.9)	20.6 (69.1)	20.6 (69.1)	20.0 (68.0)	21.1 (70.0)	18.9 (66.0)	21.4 (70.5)	18.3 (64.9)	18.3 (64.9)
Average precipitation mm (inches)	340 (13.4)	279 (11.0)	213 (8.4)	194 (7.6)	167 (6.6)	147 (5.8)	144 (5.7)	145 (5.7)	244 (9.6)	281 (11.1)	221 (8.7)	273 (10.7)	2,648 (104.3)
Average precipitation days (≥ 1.0 mm)	21	15	17	15	11	14	13	10	13	14	18	19	180
Average relative humidity (%)	80	79	78	77	79	79	79	79	80	79	79	78	79
Source: Deutscher Wetterdienst; periods: temperature extremes and precipitation 1951–1993, mean temperature 1954–1993, mean maximum and minimum temperature and humidity 1971–1993, precipitation days 1968–1981

=== Oceanography and hazards ===
The archipelago lies at the eastern edge of the Seychelles–Chagos thermocline ridge, a year-round feature between 5° and 10°S where the thermocline comes close to the surface; it marks the boundary between the westward South Equatorial Current to the south and the eastward South Equatorial Countercurrent to the north. Tides are semi-diurnal; records made at East Point in 1967 gave a maximum range of 1.6 m at spring tides and 0.7 m at neaps. Analyses of the island's tide-gauge records, kept since 1988, have differed, one finding no statistically significant long-term rise to 2011 and another a rise of 6.22 mm a year between 2003 and 2015.

Earthquake shocks are felt at times, as the area lies on a minor plate margin. On 30 November 1983 an earthquake of magnitude 7.3 in the Chagos region damaged buildings and piers on Diego Garcia, ruptured underground fuel lines and caused a small tsunami that damaged the south-east of the island. The tsunami of 26 December 2004 registered 60 cm on the tide gauge at Diego Garcia; the US Navy reported no impact on its facilities and attributed this largely to the ocean topography, including the depth of the nearby Chagos Trench.

== Natural history ==
The islands of the archipelago are young and their native plants and animals are poor in species, with no native mammals and no endemic birds. On Diego Garcia two centuries of coconut planting replaced most of the native vegetation, and since 1971 much of the western arm has been taken up by the military facility, while the eastern arm is largely protected.

=== Vegetation ===
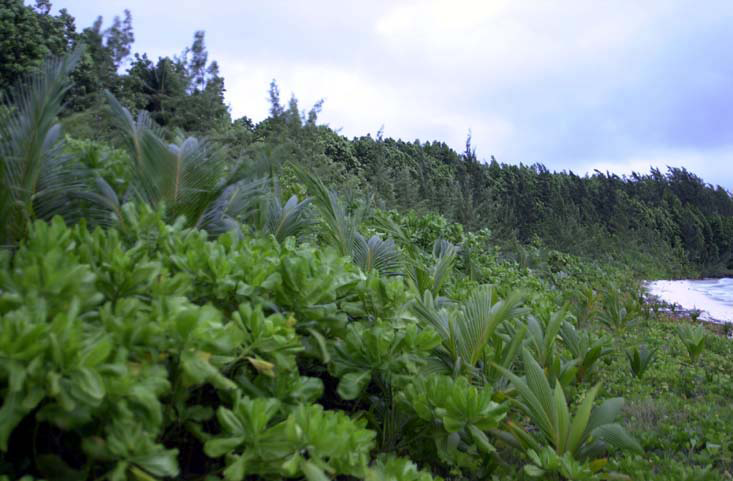
Ocean-side littoral scrub

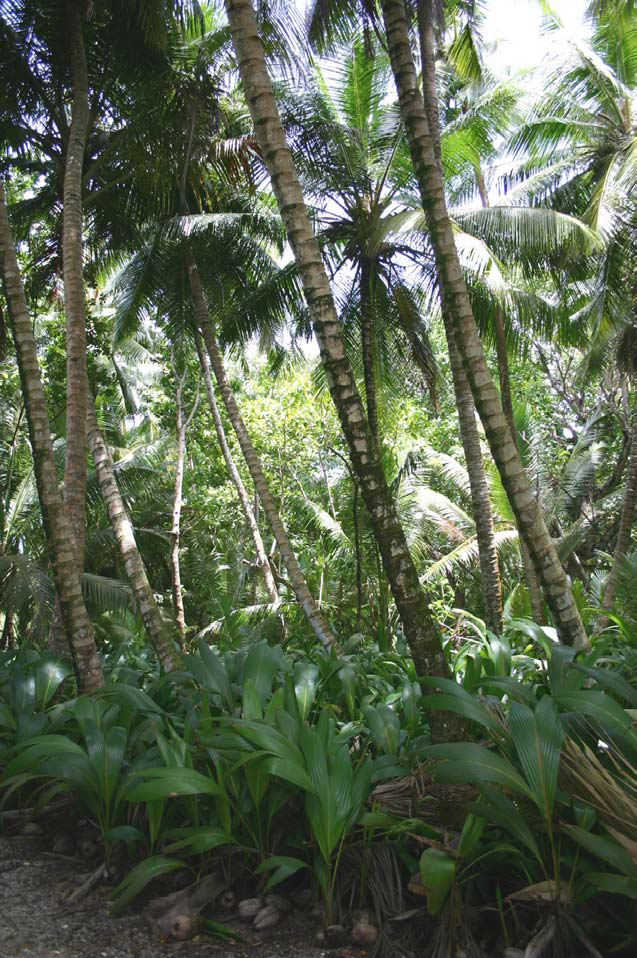
Cocos bon Dieu, dense self-sown coconut woodland

Vegetation on Diego Garcia, 2005

When Stoddart surveyed the atoll in 1967, only the vegetation of the beach crests was relatively unaltered. A hedge of Scaevola taccada lined almost the entire seaward coast, reaching 6 m high and 50 m wide on the east coast but replaced by Tournefortia argentea on the windward south-east; large Calophyllum inophyllum and Barringtonia asiatica trees overhung the lagoon shore near East Point; and Hernandia sonora was the only common large native tree, Intsia and Pisonia having become rare. Calculating from the oil output of 1864, Stoddart estimated that 6,250 of the atoll's 7,488 acres were then under coconuts. Beyond the managed plantations, largely self-sown palms formed a denser woodland known as Cocos bon Dieu, with a lower layer of Morinda citrifolia, Pipturus argenteus and Guettarda speciosa. Comparing maps of 1967 with satellite images of 2005, Hamylton and East found that about 5.6 km^{2} (2.2 sq mi) had changed from coconut to broadleaf woodland.

Most of the plants now growing on the atoll were brought by people. A checklist of the territory's flora compiled by John Topp and the Royal Botanic Gardens, Kew contained 278 taxa, 234 of them non-native, and 128 of these were recorded only on Diego Garcia. Surveys between 2021 and 2024 found about 142 non-native taxa new to the island. The barachois have no mangroves and are almost unvegetated. In 2001 the Ramsar listing described the archipelago's only known seagrass meadow of significant size, on the eastern side of the lagoon.

=== Crabs ===
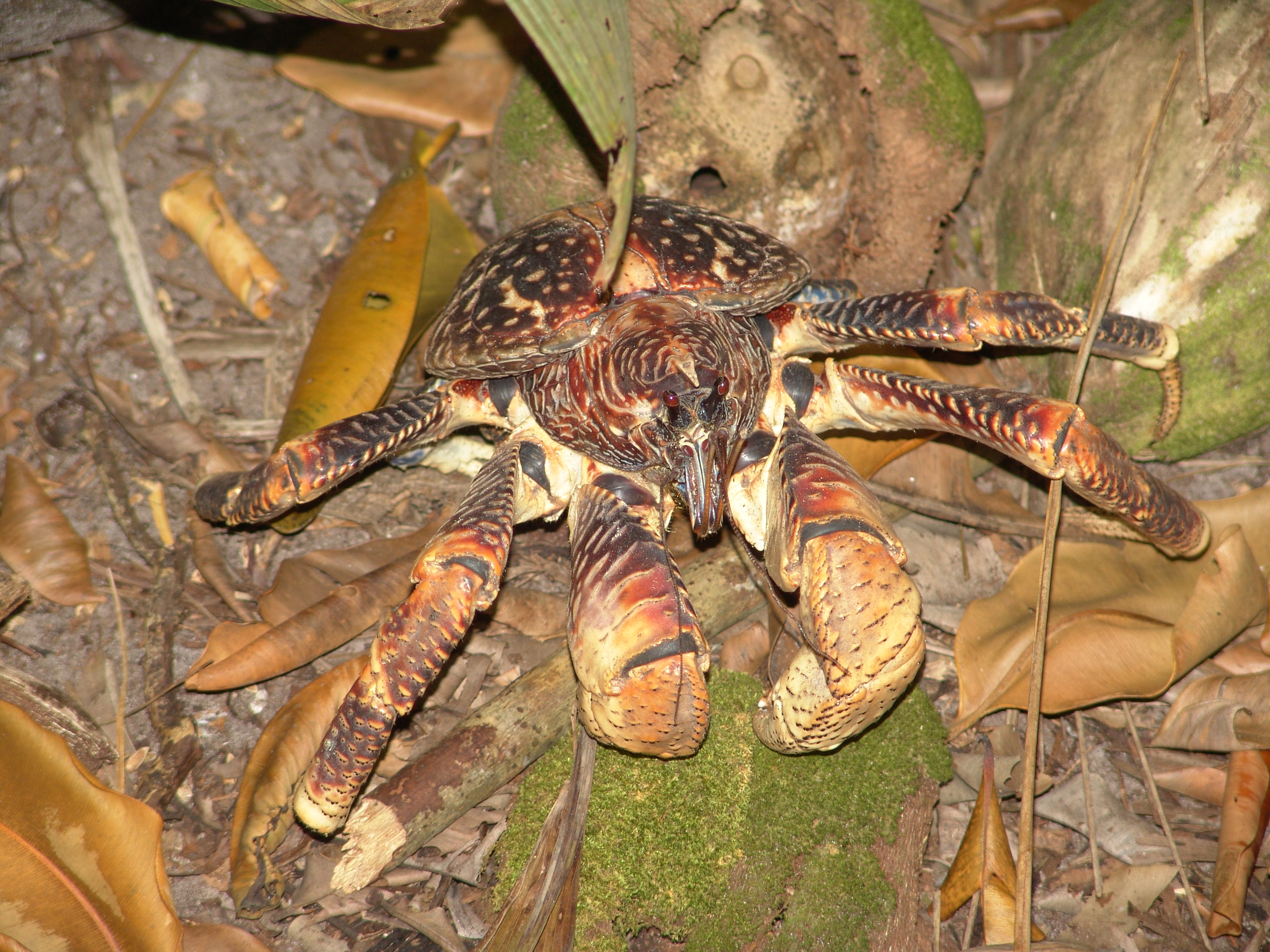
A coconut crab on Diego Garcia, 2009

The coconut crab (Birgus latro), the largest land-dwelling invertebrate, can exceed 5 kg (11 lb), according to Sheppard and colleagues. Although rare across most of its range because of over-collection, it survives in the Chagos in one of the least disturbed populations in the world. In 2010 the Ramsar area of Diego Garcia had an average of 298 coconut crabs per hectare, the highest average density ever recorded, against 39 per hectare on the inhabited side of the atoll. The species has been assessed as vulnerable on the IUCN Red List.

=== Birds ===
A great frigatebird (left, 2009) and a male Madagascar fody, an introduced species (right, 2007), on Diego Garcia

Early settlers found frigatebirds, boobies, noddies, terns, herons and tropicbirds breeding on Diego Garcia and considered them good eating. The colonies were largely destroyed during the plantation era, and by 1967 seabirds on the atoll were practically confined to the islets in the lagoon mouth. A colony of red-footed boobies on the eastern arm, in an area closed to personnel since 1984, grew from three or four pairs that year to more than 5,000 pairs by 2011. In 2020 BirdLife International assessed the eastern arm and the three islets as an Important Bird Area of 33 km^{2}, replacing the former Barton Point site, on the strength of its red-footed boobies, counted at 9,969 pairs.

The ornithologist W. R. P. Bourne considered in 1971 that the archipelago's land birds, apart from a local race of the little green heron and possibly a moorhen, were probably all introduced, among them the Madagascar fody, the Madagascar turtle dove, the cattle egret and the common myna.

=== Sea turtles ===
Volunteers carrying turtles for tagging at Turtle Cove, Diego Garcia, October 2012

Green and hawksbill turtles nest on the ocean beaches; both were heavily exploited for about two centuries until they were protected in 1968 and 1970 respectively. Mortimer and colleagues estimated that the number of clutches laid in the archipelago each year in 2011–2018 was several times that of 1996, and that Diego Garcia and Peros Banhos accounted for about 90 per cent of hawksbill and 70 per cent of green turtle nesting. Turtle Cove, in the south of the lagoon, is a foraging ground for hundreds of immature hawksbills and green turtles, some of which have been recaptured there over decades; tracking of 21 immature hawksbills in 2018–2019 found that 17 stayed in the lagoon, using areas averaging about 1 km^{2} (0.39 sq mi). Adults travel much further: seven of eight green turtles tagged after nesting on Diego Garcia migrated to foraging grounds often more than 1,000 km away, one of them 3,979 km.

=== Mammals, reptiles and invasive species ===
There are no native mammals, not even bats, and no native amphibians. Donkeys and rats were present on Diego Garcia in the 1830s, and in 1967 the feral donkeys may have numbered more than a hundred; in 1993 Edis found them especially numerous in the grassland around the transmitter antennae, "looking for all the world like game on the African plains". A programme to eradicate feral cats was under way in 2001, but in 2019 the atoll still had both rats and cats. The cane toad and the oriental garden lizard have been introduced; the lizard, first seen in May 2001, spread rapidly and reached 172 per hectare in the inhabited area, after which strict quarantine of imported materials was imposed. Surveys in 2021–2024 recorded 24 species of ant, more than half of them new to the island and many invasive, including the red imported fire ant, and found a centipede new to science, Australobius chagosensis.

=== Protected areas ===
Diego Garcia was designated a Ramsar wetland of international importance on 4 July 2001. The site, of 35,424 ha (136.77 sq mi), covers the eastern arm, most of the lagoon and the seaward reefs to 3 nautical miles, but excludes the area set aside for the US naval facility under the 1976 agreement. It qualified under seven of the eight Ramsar criteria, and its listing states that the archipelago "provides a standard for measuring the impact of human pressures on other coral reef systems". The northern part of the eastern arm and the three islets are strict nature reserves, and under the Diego Garcia Conservation (Restricted Area) Ordinance 1994 entry to the atoll's environmentally sensitive areas requires a permit. The Chagos Marine Protected Area declared in 2010 covers the territory's waters to 200 nautical miles but excludes Diego Garcia and the waters within 3 nautical miles of it.

== History ==
=== Navigators and early surveys ===
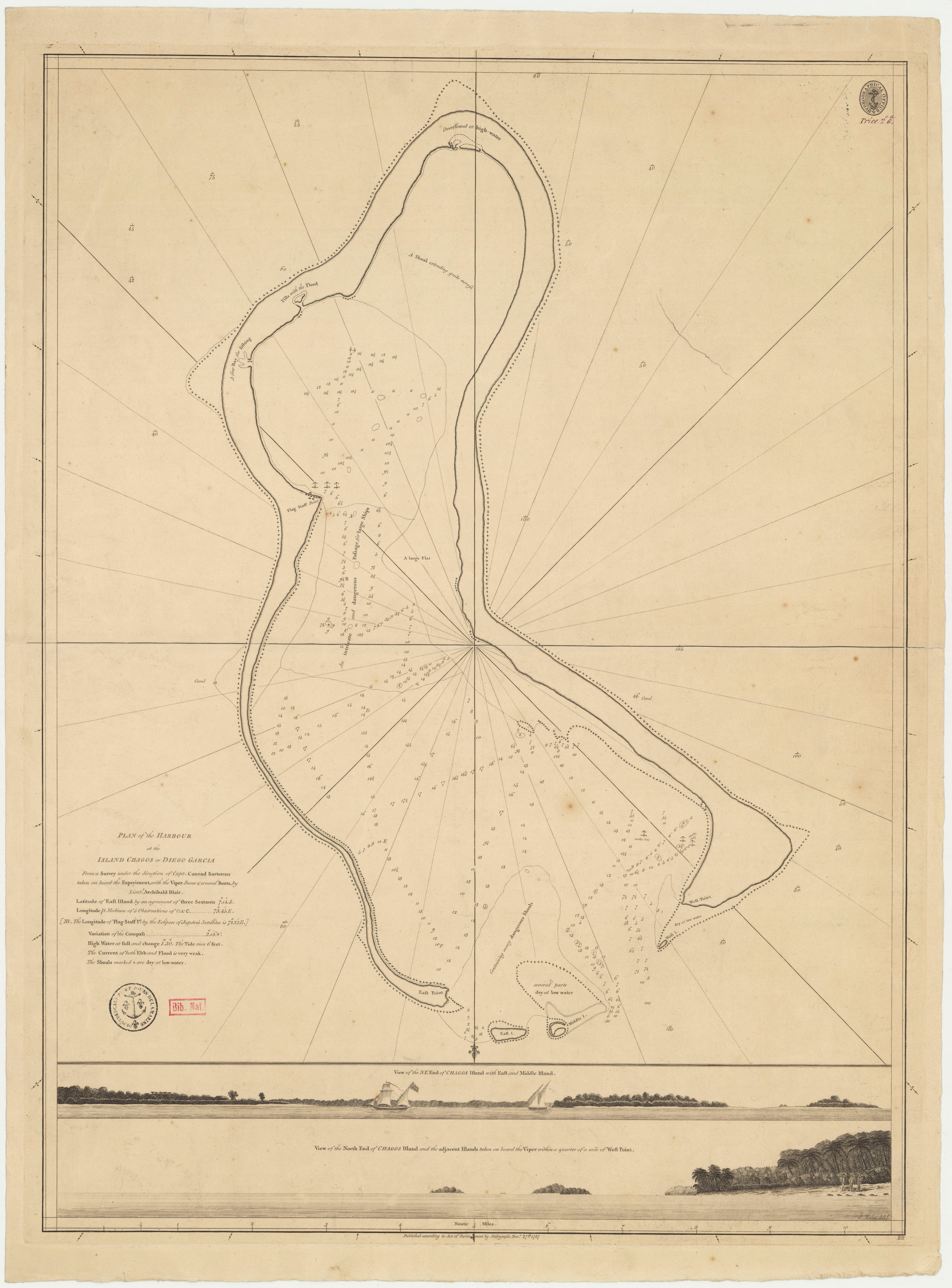
Chart of Diego Garcia published in 1787, from surveys made during the British expedition of 1786

According to Edis, earlier voyagers may have passed nearby, but if they visited, "we shall never know for they left no mark or record". Portuguese navigators probably sighted and named the islands in the first two decades of the 16th century, and Edis thought that the discoverer was probably Pedro Mascarenhas; the archipelago appeared on Portuguese charts by 1538 but "remained largely untouched". Off the main route to India and ringed by reefs, it was avoided by shipping, and more than two centuries passed before its position was reasonably fixed.

France took possession of Mauritius as Île de France in 1715, and from the 1740s its ships explored the islands to the north. In September 1769 two French ships surveyed Diego Garcia, and in 1770 La Fontaine made the first survey of its lagoon; Mauritius dates the French claim to the atoll to 1769. In May 1786 the ship Atlas was wrecked on the east coast of the atoll; one of those aboard, James Horsburgh, who later became the company's hydrographer, gave his name to Horsburgh Point.

=== The British expedition of 1786 ===
As Anglo-French rivalry in the Indian Ocean grew, the Bombay government of the East India Company sent an expedition of four ships to set up a victualling station on Diego Garcia. Entering the lagoon on 27 April 1786, it found an establishment of a Monsieur Le Normand, "a dozen huts of the meanest appearance"; disregarding it, the British took formal possession of Diego Garcia and its dependencies for George III and the company on 4 May. The settlement was laid out at the site of the present East Point, then called Flag Staff Point, and the expedition rescued the survivors of the Atlas. Its agricultural experiments were spoiled by swarms of rats, the company's directors objected to the cost, and the French Governor of Île de France, the Vicomte de Souillac, protested to Bombay; the Bombay Council decided in August to withdraw, and the expedition left in October 1786. Lieutenant Archibald Blair, who surveyed the atoll in May 1786 and stayed to survey the rest of the archipelago, produced a map that Edis considered highly accurate.

=== French concessions and enslaved workers ===
Accounts differ on when permanent settlement began. A grant of Diego Garcia to a Monsieur Dupuit de la Faye by the Governor of Mauritius in 1778 is recorded, with evidence of temporary French visits. Mauritius and the anthropologist David Vine date permanent settlement to a concession obtained by Pierre Marie Le Normand in February 1783, and Vine wrote that the archipelago's first permanent inhabitants were probably 22 enslaved Africans whom Le Normand brought to Diego Garcia at about that time. Edis and Stoddart instead place the coconut concessions in the later 1780s, after the British episode. The French authorities also began to send people with leprosy to the island, apparently in the belief that turtle meat helped to cure them; according to Peerthum, the French and then the British sent them there by force until 1828.

In 1793 Lapotaire, of Port Louis, was allowed to set up a "factory" on the island to extract copra and oil, instead of shipping loose coconuts to Mauritius; he sent out two ships with 25 to 30 men each and a complement of enslaved workers, and by the next year was exporting a considerable amount of oil to Mauritius; according to Baron d'Unienville, salted fish, coconut-fibre rope and sea cucumbers were also exported. The high price of oil during the British blockade of Île de France drew other planters, among them the brothers Paul and Aimé Cayeux, who settled at East Point and Minni Minni; in 1809 the Captain-General, Decaen, granted the east of the atoll to newcomers and banned oil-making there, and made the concession-holders responsible for the lepers sent from Île de France. By 1808 about 100 enslaved people worked for Lapotaire alone. Most of those enslaved on the Chagos had come from Madagascar and Mozambique, mainly through Mauritius.

=== Under British rule ===
After the British captured Île de France in 1810, France ceded the island, renamed Mauritius, and its dependencies, including the Chagos, by the Treaty of Paris of 1814; the archipelago was then administered as a dependency of the colony of Mauritius until 1965. The first British official on Diego Garcia, Le Camus, was appointed in 1824 after unrest among the planters, the enslaved workers and the lepers, and was also responsible for the anchorage and a quarantine station. Returns for 1826 recorded 275 inhabitants on Diego Garcia, among them 218 enslaved people and 37 people with leprosy. Slavery was abolished under the Slavery Abolition Act 1833, followed by a period of apprenticeship; in 1838 a visiting Special Justice found conditions for the 135 apprentices on Diego Garcia "decidedly inferior to those of labourers on the other islands I have visited". The freed people mostly stayed on the plantations, and later labourers recruited from Mauritius married into their families; those born in the islands came to be known as the Ilois. In 1837 Commander Robert Moresby of the Indian Navy made the first full hydrographic survey of the atoll and planted breadfruit trees from Ceylon.

=== The plantations ===
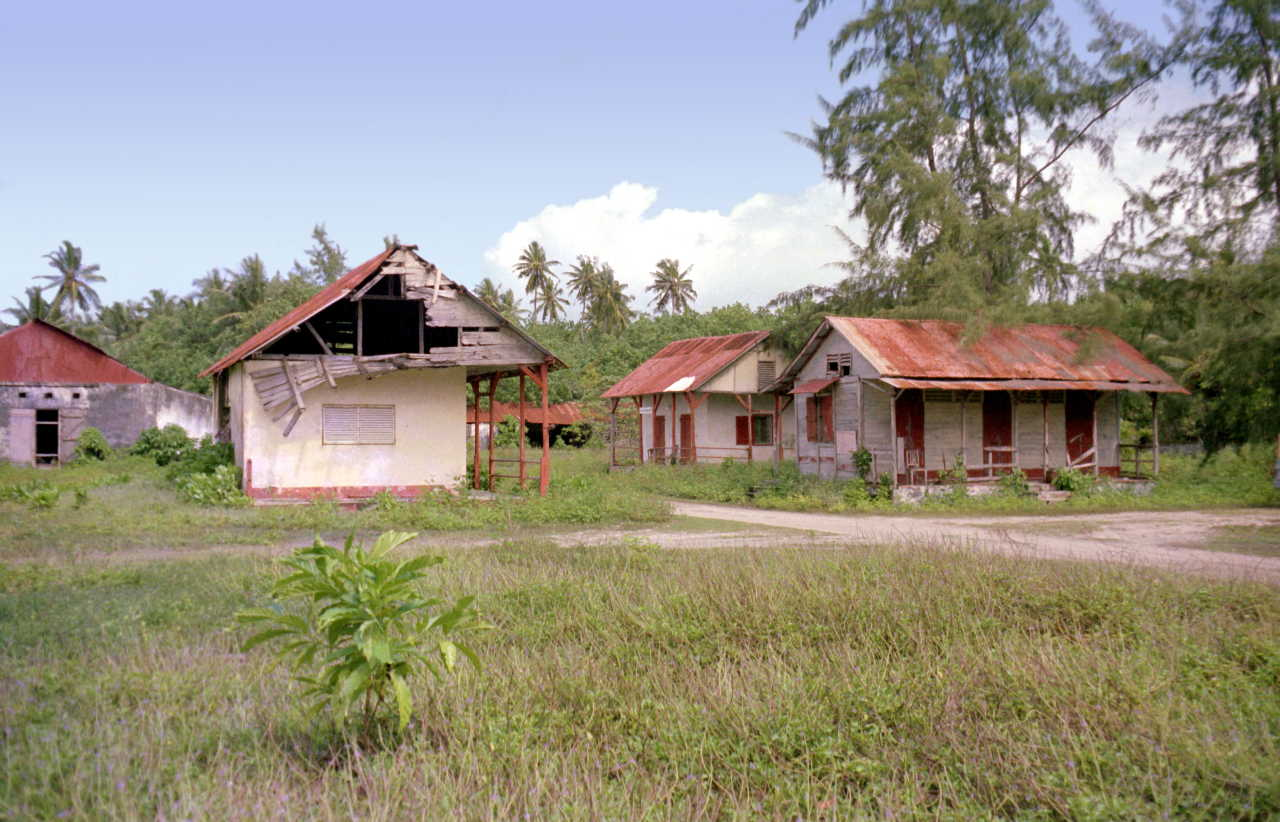
Former plantation buildings at East Point, photographed in 1982; they have since been restored

By the 1860s the atoll had three estates, East Point, Pointe Marianne and Minni Minni, which in 1864 were assessed as producing some 99,000 gallons of coconut oil a year; several surviving buildings at East Point bear the date 1864. In 1883 the three estates were merged into the Société Huilière de Diégo et Péros, which ran them, with the plantations of the outer islands, until 1962. East Point, with a chapel built in 1895 and later a church, a jetty and a light railway, became the commercial centre and the place where all processing was done, while Pointe Marianne became its outstation. In the second half of the 19th century the island's population fluctuated between 350 and 550, and women rarely made up more than a fifth of it.

Men gathered and husked a daily quota of coconuts, women broke the nuts and extracted the kernels, and the dried kernels, or copra, were ground in mills turned by donkeys. In the early 20th century, as oil fell out of use for lighting and better methods of drying were introduced, copra replaced oil as the main product, exported to Mauritius for the extraction of oil. The islands also produced timber, honey, salt fish, pigs and wooden boats, and from the mid-1950s guano. Magistrates from Mauritius visited to make sure that nobody was held on the island against their will or treated with cruelty.

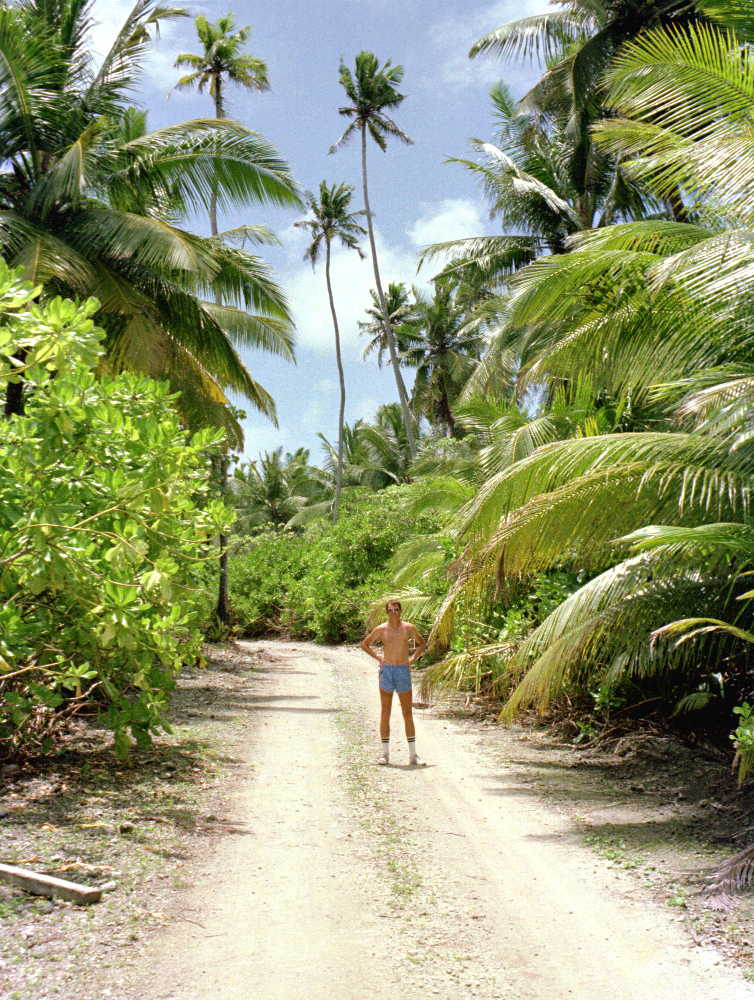
The road to the former plantation on the eastern side of the atoll, 1982

In 1955, when the Governor of Mauritius, Sir Robert Scott, visited, East Point was at the peak of its development; he wrote that it had "the look of a French coastal village, miraculously transferred whole to this shore", and some of the island's 680 people met him at the pier. Hamlets with names such as Balisage, Camp du Puits, Roches Pointes, Port Dumoulin and Noroit were scattered round both arms of the atoll. By then, however, the population was falling: it halved between 1952 and 1962, and by the mid-1960s labourers brought from Seychelles outnumbered those born on the island by two to one. In 1962 the plantations were sold to Chagos Agalega Ltd, a company formed in Seychelles whose largest shareholders were the Colonial Steamship Company of Mauritius and the Seychelles businessman Paul Moulinié.

=== Coaling station, 1882–1888 ===
Admiralty chart of Diego Garcia from the lagoon entrance to East Point, from the 1885 survey by HMS Rambler, published in 1886

The opening of the Suez Canal in 1869 and the spread of steamships made the atoll, on the route between the Red Sea and Australia, attractive as a coaling station. In 1882 the Orient and Pacific Steam Navigation Company moved its coaling station for the Australian route from Aden to Diego Garcia, and the London firm of Lund and Company also set up there; in the second half of 1883, 34 large steamers and two Royal Navy warships called to coal. The Orient company kept its coal mostly on hulks in the lagoon, its agent lived on East Island and its workforce on Middle Island, and the need for safe navigation led to a survey of the lagoon by HMS Rambler in 1885.

Imported labourers and the crews and passengers of visiting ships brought disorder, and in 1883 a mob besieged the manager's house at East Point. A police post of an inspector, a sergeant and six constables was set up at Minni Minni in 1885, but it was withdrawn in 1888 after disputes over its cost, and regular British police officers were not stationed on the island again until 1973. As ships gained range the business became unprofitable, and the Orient company left in 1888.

=== The Emden, 1914 ===
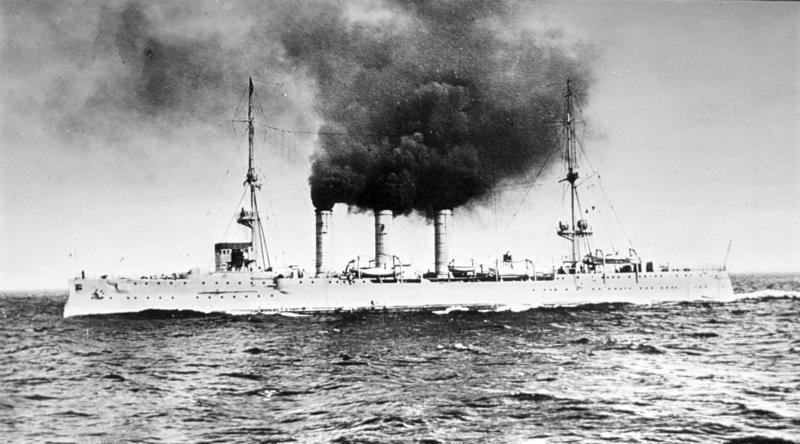
The German light cruiser SMS Emden, which called at Diego Garcia in October 1914, photographed in about 1910

In October 1914, early in the First World War, the German light cruiser SMS Emden put in at Diego Garcia to take on coal and clean her hull. (Note: Stoddart dates the visit to 9 October 1914; the British Indian Ocean Territory Administration gives 5 October 1914 and says that the ship stayed for about a week.) The islanders had not heard that war had broken out; one of the ship's officers, Hellmuth von Mücke, wrote that the crew learned from a visitor that "Diego Garcia receives a mail only twice a year, by way of Mauritius". The Emden was destroyed at the Cocos (Keeling) Islands on 9 November 1914.

=== Second World War ===
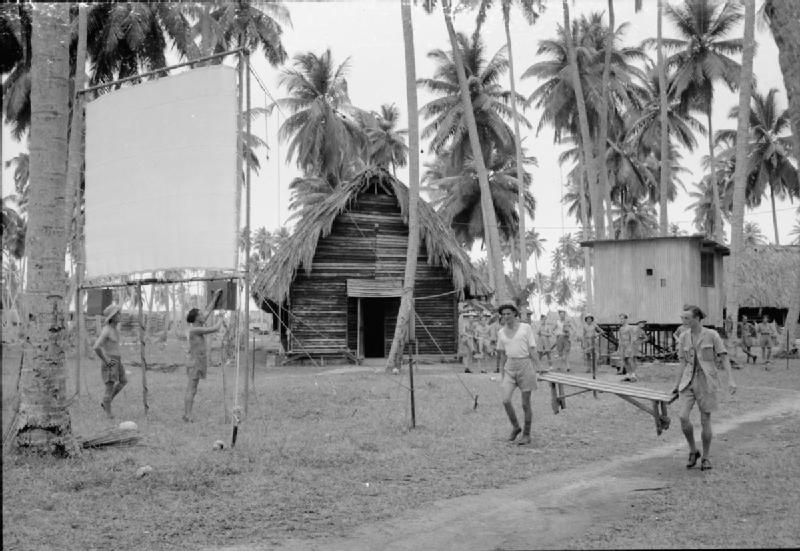
Royal Air Force personnel building an open-air cinema at the RAF base on Diego Garcia during the Second World War

After the Japanese attack on Colombo in April 1942, Diego Garcia became one of several fuelling and minor operational bases for naval craft and flying boats. According to the territory's administration, a Royal Air Force station with an advanced flying-boat unit was opened at East Point in 1942, and two six-inch naval guns were installed at Cannon Point and manned by Mauritian and Indian troops; nine members of these units are buried in a Commonwealth war graves cemetery at Pointe Marianne. The Catholic priest Roger Dussercle, who had visited the islands since 1933, ministered to the garrison and conducted the funerals of soldiers buried there. A cyclone that passed just south of the atoll in September 1944 destroyed two Catalina flying boats, and the wreck of a Catalina still lies on the shore near East Point. The military interest was short-lived, and the installations had fallen into decay by 1948.

A Remembrance Day ceremony at the Pointe Marianne cemetery, November 2025

=== The Anglo-American survey of 1964 ===
In talks in London in February 1964 on American defence interests in the Indian Ocean, the United States sought a communications facility on Diego Garcia, and British officials undertook to recommend that Britain acquire the land, resettle the population and pay compensation, while the United States met the costs of construction. Later that year a joint team surveyed the archipelago and several islands of Seychelles. It counted 483 people on Diego Garcia, 172 of them Mauritians and 311 Seychellois, and some 6,000 acres of coconut plantations. The British member of the team, the Colonial Office official Robert Newton, reported that if the plans went ahead, "the whole of Diego Garcia will be required for defence purposes. This will involve the eviction of the existing civilian population." He recommended that the British government accept responsibility for re-employing the inhabitants on other islands and for resettling in Mauritius and Seychelles those unwilling or unable to accept re-employment.

=== Detachment ===
Not wanting the base to depend on newly independent states, the Americans asked for the whole archipelago to be detached from Mauritius. At Lancaster House on 23 September 1965, during the conference on Mauritian independence, the Premier, Seewoosagur Ramgoolam, and two other ministers agreed in principle to detachment in return for compensation of £3 million and undertakings that included the islands' return to Mauritius when they were no longer needed for defence. An Order in Council of 8 November 1965 created the British Indian Ocean Territory from the Chagos Archipelago and three islands detached from Seychelles. Mauritius argues that its ministers were given "no choice at all", while the United Kingdom calls the agreement "a freely negotiated package"; in 2019 the International Court of Justice concluded that the detachment "was not based on the free and genuine expression of the will of the people concerned".

Under the exchange of notes of 30 December 1966, the territory was made available for the defence purposes of both governments, and a confidential Agreed Minute listed "resettling any inhabitants" among the administrative measures the United Kingdom was to take (see below). Islanders who went to Mauritius in 1967 and 1968 on leave, at the end of their contracts or for medical treatment were refused passage home.

=== Removal of the population, 1971 ===
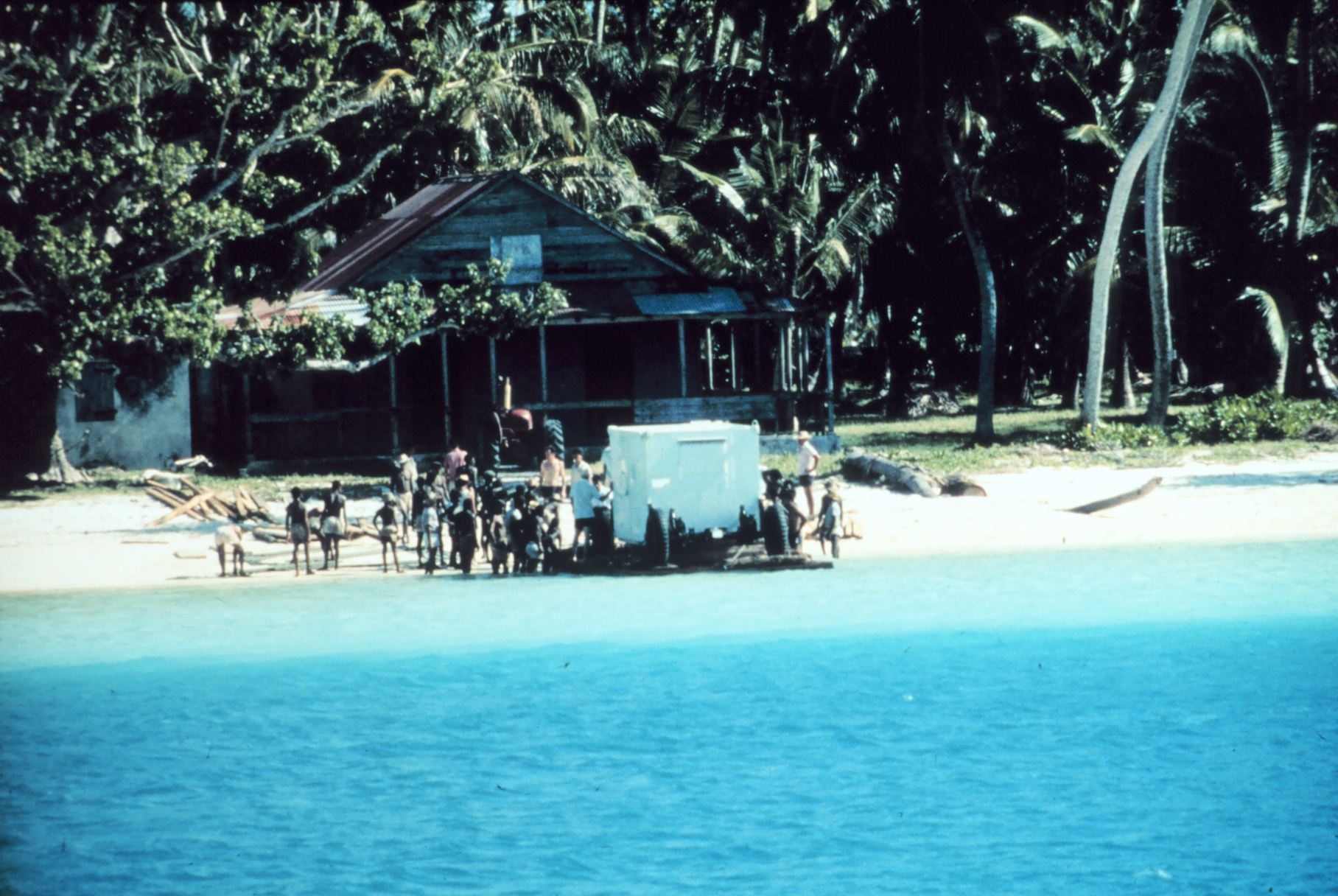
Ilois helping American personnel to bring equipment ashore on Diego Garcia, 1971

The United States asked for Diego Garcia to be evacuated by July 1971. On 24 January 1971 the BIOT Administrator, John Todd, told the assembled inhabitants that "we intended to close the island in July", while Peros Banhos and Salomon could continue for some time. On 16 April 1971 the BIOT Commissioner, Sir Bruce Greatbatch, enacted the Immigration Ordinance 1971, which made it unlawful to enter or remain in the territory without a permit. Lord Hoffmann later said that there was "no evidence that it had ever been used to expel anyone", and that those who left did so "because they were left with the alternative of being abandoned without support or supplies".

The ship Nordvaer reached Diego Garcia on 25 July 1971 and took some of the islanders to Salomon and Peros Banhos before sailing to Mahé in Seychelles; a chartered schooner followed in September. The High Court found: "There is no evidence of physical force being used, but most of their dogs were rounded up and gassed or burnt in the 'calorifer' used in copra production." In Ouseley J's words, "There was only no choice available of staying on." The voyage to Mahé was, in the court's words, "dreadful", and in Mahé the islanders were housed in an unused section of the prison until they sailed for Port Louis on 8 October. The evacuation was completed on 31 October 1971. The International Court of Justice described this as "The main forcible removal of Diego Garcia's population", and found that between 1967 and 1973 the whole population of the archipelago was either prevented from returning or "forcibly removed and prevented from returning". The British government has accepted that the removal was carried out "with a callous disregard of their interests".

=== Construction of the base ===
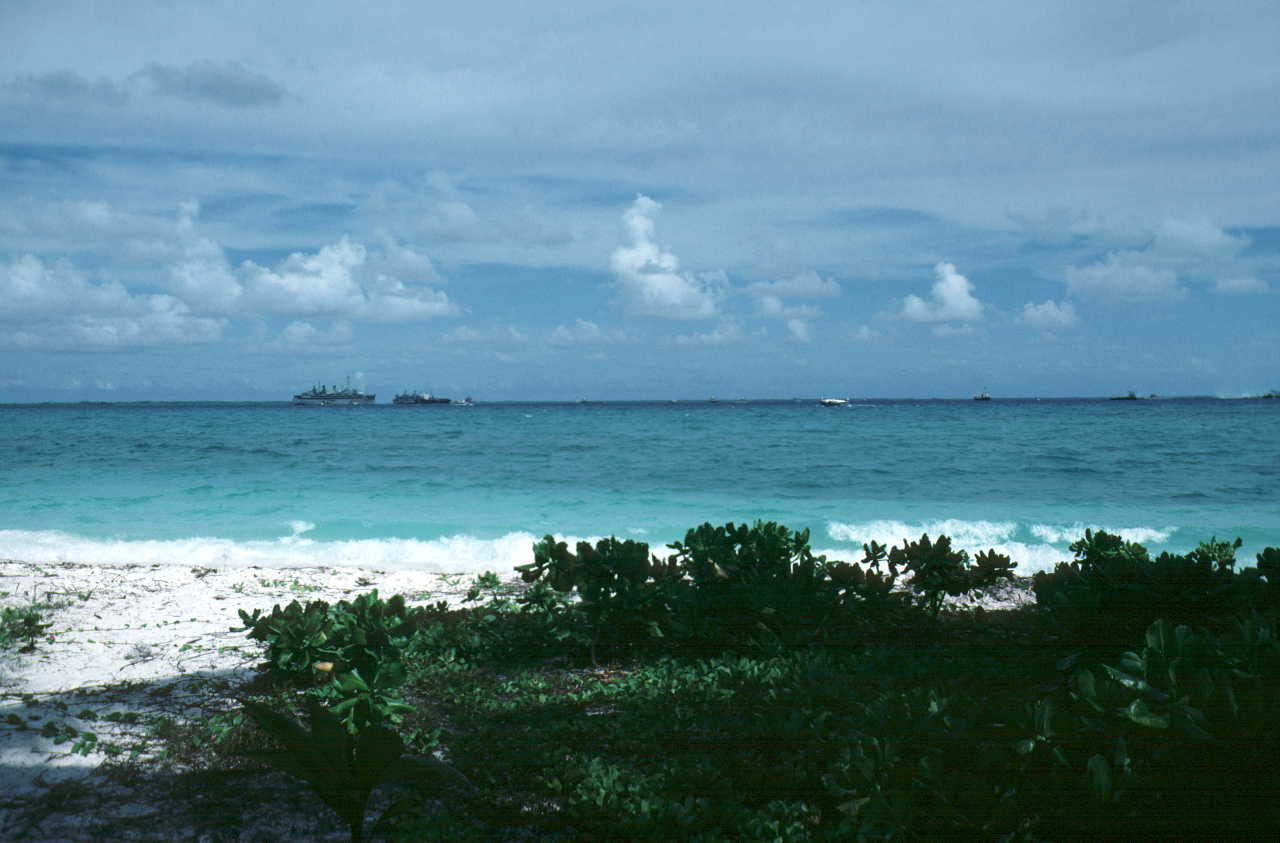
Pre-positioned support ships in the lagoon, 1982

United States Navy construction units (Seabees) landed in March 1971 to build a communications station and an airstrip, whose runway was operational by July. By notes exchanged on 24 October 1972 the British government approved "a limited naval communications facility on Diego Garcia", with an anchorage, an airfield and accommodation, and undertook not to permit commercial fishing in the lagoon or the exploitation of oil and minerals. According to the British government, it began operating early in 1973. In 1974 the British government agreed to an American proposal to expand it, saying that this was "desirable in the general Western interest to balance increased Soviet activities in the Indian Ocean area", and the Diego Garcia Agreement 1976 approved its development into "a support facility of the United States Navy", whose use, apart from the normal movements of ships and aircraft, was to be "a matter for the joint decision of the two Governments".

Building the base reshaped the north-west of the atoll: land was reclaimed to extend the airfield, its parking apron and the wharf, coral was dredged from a 6.4-kilometre (4.0 mi) stretch of seaward reef from 1971 for aggregate, and an estimated 30.8 km^{2} of lagoon was dredged. In 1983 the British government agreed to further improvements, including expanded storage and wharf installations and a new taxiway and parking apron. According to the legal scholar Peter Sand, the base was a staging area for 20 B-52 bombers in the Gulf War of 1990–91, and a camp of 190 tent pads for deployed air force personnel, known as Camp Justice, was built at Pointe Marianne in 1990.

=== 21st century ===
Bombers flying from Diego Garcia were used in the war in Afghanistan from 2001 and in the invasion of Iraq in 2003, and the British government has said that the base supported operations in Iraq and Afghanistan and against the Islamic State. In 2008 the government acknowledged that, despite earlier assurances, the island had been used for two rendition flights in 2002 (see Controversies). On 16 November 2016 the British government announced, alongside its decision against resettling the Chagossians, that the defence agreements with the United States "will continue as they stand until 30 December 2036".

In October 2021 a boat carrying Sri Lankan Tamils bound for Canada was escorted to Diego Garcia, and its passengers became the first people to claim asylum in the territory; by December 2022, 349 people had arrived on seven boats, and those who remained lived in tents in a fenced camp near the runway. The last of them were flown to the United Kingdom in December 2024, after which the territory's Supreme Court declared that a group of them had been unlawfully detained (see British Indian Ocean Territory § Marooned asylum seekers). In 2022 a fibre-optic branch of the Oman Australia Cable was laid to the island; according to Reuters, the United States Department of Defense paid for about a third of the cable on condition that it include the branch. In September 2022 the head of the Philippine Department of Migrant Workers said that around 800 Filipino workers were stranded on the island after the base's main contractor, KBR, had allegedly barred them from going on holiday; according to The Washington Post, the company said that flights had been cancelled for lack of demand and because of COVID-19.

=== 2026 ===
In January 2026 Trump criticised the planned transfer of sovereignty, and in February British media reported that the British government had refused an American request to use Diego Garcia and RAF Fairford for any pre-emptive strike on Iran; according to The Times, the government was concerned that allowing it "would be a breach of international law". After American and Israeli strikes on Iran began at the end of February, the Prime Minister, Keir Starmer, said on 1 March that he would allow the United States to use Diego Garcia for "specific and limited defensive purposes". On 20 March ministers extended the permission to strikes on Iranian missile sites targeting the Strait of Hormuz, from British bases including Diego Garcia.

On 20 March 2026 The Wall Street Journal, citing American officials, reported that Iran had fired two intermediate-range ballistic missiles at Diego Garcia, neither of which hit the base; one failed in flight, and a US warship fired an SM-3 interceptor at the other, although it could not be determined whether the interception succeeded. The Defence Secretary, John Healey, told the House of Commons on 23 March that in the early hours of 20 March "two Iranian missiles were launched in the direction of Diego Garcia", that "One fell short of its target, while the other was brought down short of its target", and that "Neither got close to Diego Garcia. The UK was not required to take action, and normal operations continue." The Israeli chief of staff, Eyal Zamir, said that Iran had used "a two-stage intercontinental ballistic missile with a range of 4,000km". Asked whether NATO shared that assessment, its secretary general, Mark Rutte, said: "We cannot confirm that at the moment, so we're looking into that." Iran's foreign ministry spokesman, Esmail Baghaei, denied that Iran had targeted the base and called the accusation an "Israeli false flag". Markus Schiller of the Stockholm International Peace Research Institute wrote that, if the reports were accurate, Iran had shown a range of nearly 4,000 km, beyond its self-declared limit of 2,000 km, but judged the military implications small, since one missile reportedly failed and the other was shot down.

In April 2026 the British government said that a change in the US President's position had made it "impossible to agree at political level" an update to the 1966 exchange of notes, which it described as "necessary to ratify the treaty", and the implementing bill lapsed at the end of the parliamentary session on 29 April.

== The people of Diego Garcia ==
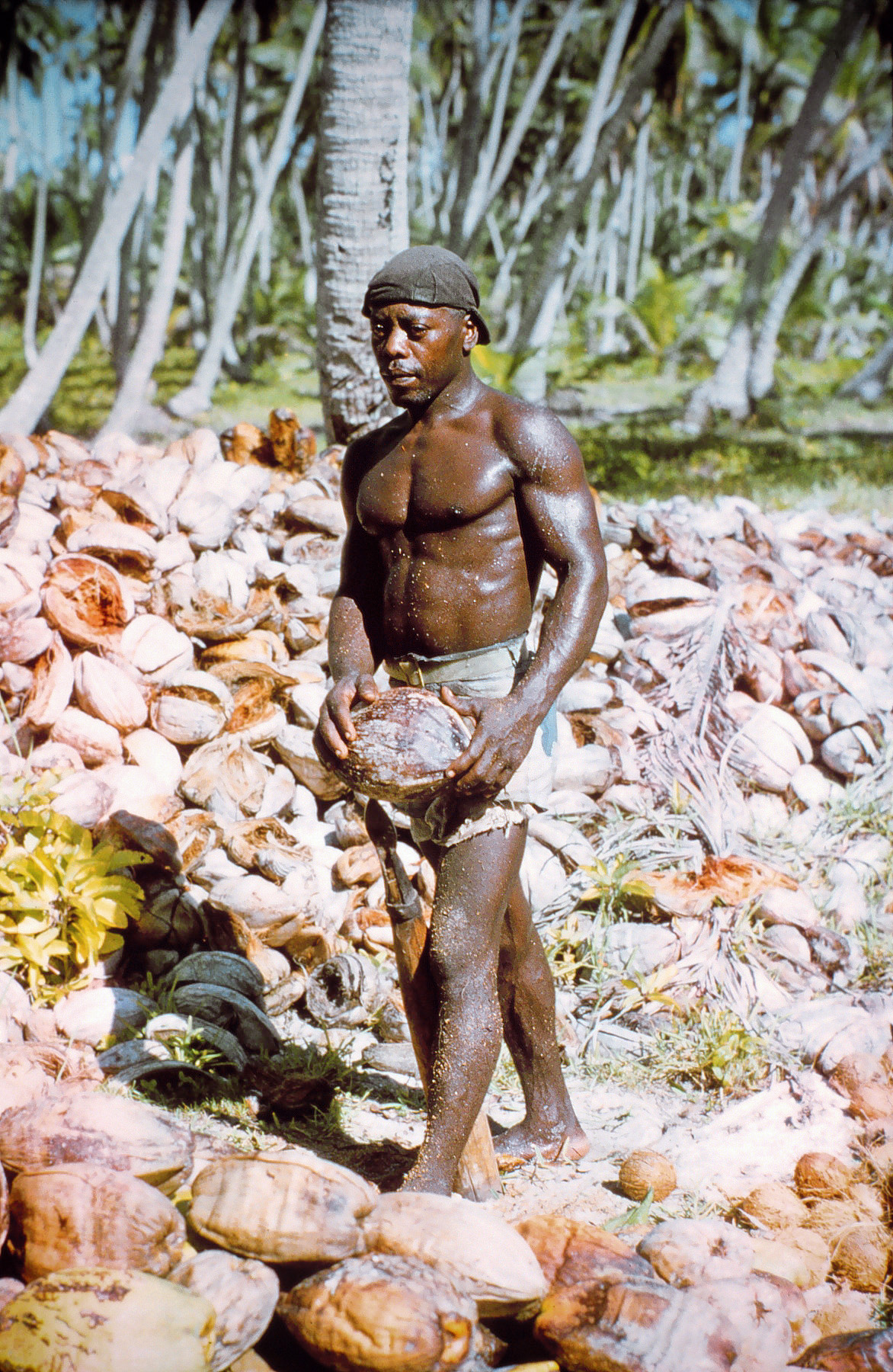
An inhabitant of Diego Garcia in 1971, at the time of the first American encampment

=== The Ilois community ===
The plantation population of Diego Garcia had several origins. The descendants of the enslaved Africans and Malagasy freed in the 1830s were joined after emancipation by labourers recruited in Mauritius, including a small number of Indian indentured labourers, and after the Second World War in Seychelles; those born in the islands came to be known as the Ilois. By the 1960s the people of the islands fell into three groups: contract workers from Mauritius, contract workers from Seychelles, and families born on the islands. The missionary Roger Dussercle found in 1933 that about 60 per cent of its people had been born and raised there and that they spoke a Creole similar to that of Mauritius. Their language, Chagos Kreol or Chagossian Creole, had emerged in the 19th century.

By the turn of the 20th century there were six villages on Diego Garcia, with a hospital on each arm of the atoll, and most islanders came to regard themselves as Roman Catholic. The company was the sole employer and provided rations, a dispensary, basic medical attention, limited schooling and a priest; wages were very low. A ship from Mauritius, run with a subsidy from the Mauritius government, brought supplies and carried workers on leave or needing treatment, and expectant mothers often went to Mauritius to give birth. Holidays were marked by sports days with donkey races, sack races, tug of war and swimming competitions, and by dances, among them the séga, which European visitors such as Dussercle regarded as too wild.

=== Removal and exile ===
A British official counted about 359 people on Diego Garcia in March 1971, out of about 829 in the archipelago. All were removed between July and October 1971, some to Peros Banhos and Salomon, from where they were taken to Mauritius in 1972 and 1973, and others to Seychelles and Mauritius. Most of the islanders went to Mauritius because of their long connection with it, and there, the High Court found, "extreme poverty routinely marked their lives". The United Kingdom paid £650,000 to Mauritius in 1973 and a further £4 million under a 1982 agreement, in return for which most recipients signed or thumbprinted forms renouncing further claims. The British Overseas Territories Act 2002 made many of them British citizens, and many moved to the United Kingdom, mainly to Crawley; in 2022 the British government estimated that there were about 10,000 Chagossians in the United Kingdom, Mauritius and Seychelles.

From 2000 Chagossians brought a series of cases in the English courts, beginning with Bancoult (No 1), and later in Strasbourg and the United States, without securing a right to return (see Expulsion of the Chagossians § Litigation in the United Kingdom). Since 2004 the territory's constitution has declared that "no person has the right of abode in the Territory"; in March 2026 its Supreme Court quashed that provision in a case brought by Chagossians who had landed on Île du Coin in Peros Banhos, but stayed its order pending an appeal. The British government decided against resettlement in 2016, and the 2025 treaty would allow Mauritius to resettle only the islands other than Diego Garcia. The Committee on the Elimination of Racial Discrimination objected that the treaty "explicitly prevents the return of the Chagossian people to their ancestral lands in Diego Garcia Island". Two Chagossian women born on Diego Garcia who opposed the treaty said that they had asked the committee to act.

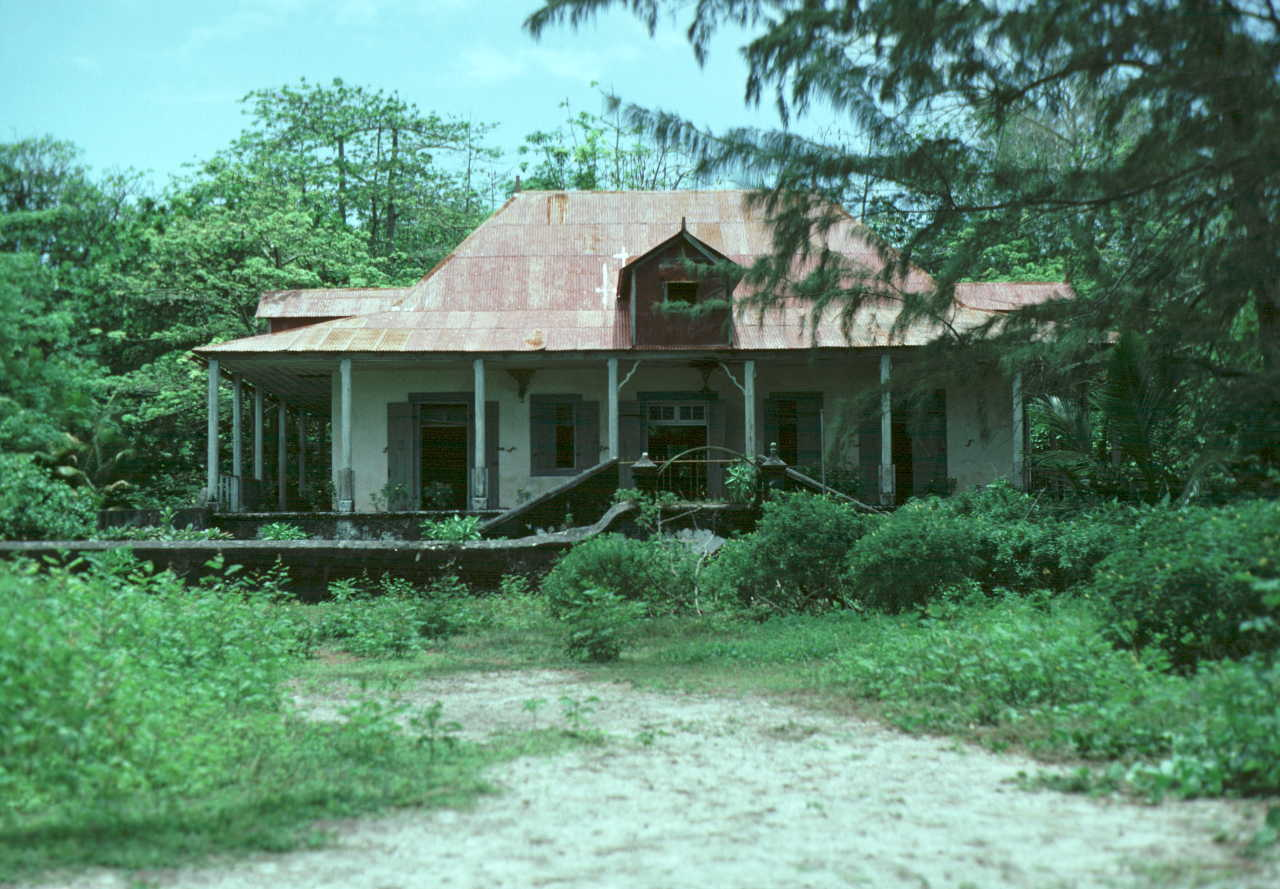
Plantation buildings on Diego Garcia in 1982, eleven years after the removal of the inhabitants

=== Present population ===
The atoll has no permanent inhabitants. According to the territory's administration, there are ordinarily around 2,000 people on Diego Garcia, mostly British and American military personnel, officials of the administration and civilian contractors who maintain and operate the military facility. The US Navy said in 2011 that only unaccompanied active-duty military personnel were posted to the island. The base's main contractor, KBR, employed about 1,200 workers from the Philippines, India, Kenya and Mauritius in 2024, according to The Observer. The main settlement, known as "Downtown", lies at the north-western tip of the atoll, with the quarters of the military personnel, the headquarters, shops, a place of worship, a swimming pool and other facilities of a small town; contractors are housed to its south. There is no American development on the eastern side of the atoll, where the restored manager's house, chapel, jail, store, hospital and copra mills of the East Point plantation survive around the old plantation square.

== Status and administration ==
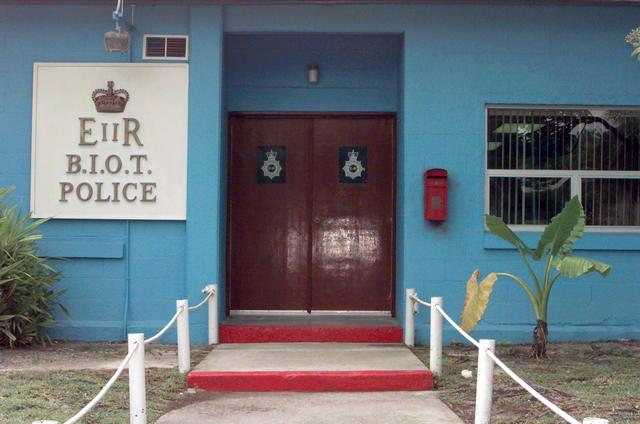
The British Indian Ocean Territory Police station on Diego Garcia, 1998

Diego Garcia is part of the British Indian Ocean Territory, a British overseas territory whose constitution is the British Indian Ocean Territory (Constitution) Order 2004, made under the royal prerogative. The territory has no legislature and no elections; a Commissioner, appointed by the King on the advice of British ministers, makes its laws, and an Administrator runs it from day to day, with a staff of about 40 based in the United Kingdom. On Diego Garcia the administration is represented by a Royal Navy commander, the Commissioner's Representative, known as the "Brit Rep", who is also the officer commanding British forces on the island, the daily point of contact with the American authorities, the Principal Immigration Officer and the Registrar of Births, Deaths and Marriages. In 2011 the US Navy described the fewer than 50 British personnel on the island as mostly members of Naval Party 1002, Royal Navy and Royal Marines personnel who formed the civil administration and carried out policing and customs duties.

The British Indian Ocean Territory Police, based on Diego Garcia, has a civilian chief of police and ten Royal Overseas Police Officers, military police officers appointed to a civilian role. Where no specific law of the territory applies, the law of England applies "so far as it is applicable and suitable to local circumstances", and the territory has its own Magistrate's Court, Supreme Court and Court of Appeal, with a final appeal to the Judicial Committee of the Privy Council. No one may enter or be present without a permit, apart from members of the armed forces, public officers and listed contractors' personnel, and the administration describes the territory as "not a tourist destination". The US dollar is used, vehicles keep to the right, and the territory's post office is on Diego Garcia.

The use of the military facility is governed by agreements between the United Kingdom and the United States (see below). Mauritius is a party to the Pelindaba Treaty, which requires parties to prohibit the stationing of nuclear explosive devices in their territory, and the United Kingdom to two of its protocols; according to Peter Sand, Mauritius and the other African states included the Chagos in the treaty's scope, but the United Kingdom does "not accept the inclusion of that Territory within the African nuclear-weapon-free zone". When parliamentarians raised the treaty in 2025, the British government said that its obligations would be met.

== The 1966 agreement and the base ==
The defence use of Diego Garcia rests on an exchange of notes concluded in London on 30 December 1966, under which the British Indian Ocean Territory was made available "for the defense purposes of both Governments as they may arise". The territory was to remain under British sovereignty, sites were to be provided to the United States "without charge", and each facility required the approval in principle of both governments. The agreement was to last for 50 years and then for a further 20 unless either government gave notice; in 2016 the British government announced that the arrangements would "continue as they stand until 30 December 2036". A confidential Agreed Minute stated that the "administrative measures" the United Kingdom was to take included "resettling any inhabitants"; it remained confidential until it was disclosed in litigation in 2000, and in 2006 the Divisional Court said that by agreeing to it the British government "was effectively sealing the fate of those living on an island" once the United States required it, noting that in fact only Diego Garcia had been "required". Under secret notes on financing, the United States contributed to the cost of setting up the territory by waiving British payments for the Polaris missile programme; the arbitral tribunal in the Chagos Marine Protected Area Arbitration put the contribution at £5 million, and a US Navy paper of 1970 at $14 million.

The base itself was authorised by later instruments: notes of 1972 approved "a limited naval communications facility on Diego Garcia", and the Diego Garcia Agreement 1976 its development into a naval support facility, whose use, apart from the normal movements of ships and aircraft, is "a matter for the joint decision of the two Governments". Further instruments of 1982, 1987 and 1999 dealt with environmental protection, the award of contracts to joint ventures of American and British firms, and a hydroacoustic monitoring station for the Comprehensive Nuclear-Test-Ban Treaty. In April 2026 a British minister described an update to the 1966 notes as "necessary to ratify the treaty" with Mauritius.

In its 2019 advisory opinion the International Court of Justice recorded that the talks between the two governments had led to the conclusion of the 1966 agreement "for the establishment of a military base by the United States on the Chagos Archipelago", and found that, following it, the inhabitants were removed between 1967 and 1973. In a separate opinion, Judge Patrick Robinson examined the agreement under the law of treaties. He wrote that the administrative measures in the Agreed Minute "are as much a part of the 1966 Agreement as the United Kingdom's agreement to make the islands available for defence purposes", and that, although the minute spoke of resettlement, "it necessarily implies removal of the inhabitants prior to their resettlement". Finding no evidence that the peoples of Mauritius, including the Chagossians, had been consulted, he concluded that the agreement conflicted with their right to self-determination, a norm of jus cogens, and was therefore "void by virtue of Article 53 of the VCLT" and "incapable of producing any legal effects", although the court's operative conclusions made no such finding. The court itself held that the United Kingdom's continued administration of the archipelago was a wrongful act which it was obliged to end "as rapidly as possible".

== Sovereignty dispute and the 2025 agreement ==
=== Claims and rulings ===
Mauritius took up its claim to the archipelago in 1980, the year in which the Organisation of African Unity demanded that Diego Garcia be "unconditionally returned to Mauritius", and since 1992 the Constitution of Mauritius has included the Chagos Archipelago and Diego Garcia in the national territory. The United Kingdom maintained that the territory "is British and has been since 1814" and would be ceded to Mauritius "when no longer required for defence purposes". In 2015 an arbitral tribunal held that the undertakings given to Mauritius in 1965 were legally binding. At the request of the General Assembly in resolution 71/292, the International Court of Justice advised in 2019 that the decolonisation of Mauritius "was not lawfully completed", and the Assembly endorsed the opinion in resolution 73/295. The British government said that the opinion "is not a legally binding judgment". Mauritius told the court that it "accepts the future operation of the base in accordance with international law"; Judge Peter Tomka observed that the court "remained silent on this point". In 2021 a special chamber of the International Tribunal for the Law of the Sea treated Mauritius as the coastal state for the archipelago in its boundary case with the Maldives.

=== Negotiations ===
The two governments opened negotiations in November 2022, and on 3 October 2024 they announced a political agreement under which the United Kingdom would accept Mauritian sovereignty, including over Diego Garcia, and would be authorised to exercise Mauritius's sovereign rights over Diego Garcia for an initial 99 years. The US President, Joe Biden, said that it "secures the effective operation of the joint facility on Diego Garcia into the next century". After a change of government in Mauritius the terms were renegotiated, and the treaty was signed on 22 May 2025 by the prime ministers Keir Starmer and Navin Ramgoolam.

=== Provisions for Diego Garcia ===
Keir Starmer at a press conference after signing the treaty, 22 May 2025

Under Article 1 of the treaty the United Kingdom accepts that "Mauritius is sovereign over the Chagos Archipelago in its entirety, including Diego Garcia". Under Article 2, Mauritius "as sovereign" authorises the United Kingdom to exercise its rights and authorities with respect to Diego Garcia, including all those required for "the long-term, secure and effective operation of the Base", and the United Kingdom may authorise the United States to operate the base jointly. For these purposes "Diego Garcia" means the island and a 12-nautical-mile zone around it, including the airspace above and the seabed below. Under Article 13 the treaty lasts 99 years and may be extended by 40 years, failing which the United Kingdom has a right of first refusal over the use of Diego Garcia.

Annex 1 gives the United Kingdom "unrestricted access, basing and overflight" on Diego Garcia for British and American aircraft and vessels, and control of armed operations, weapons and the electromagnetic spectrum. Any installation between 12 and 24 nautical miles from Diego Garcia, and the presence of other states' security forces elsewhere in the archipelago, require a joint decision, and development on the outer islands is subject to a Mauritian "Security Review" in which the United Kingdom may make submissions. The British government described these provisions as including a "24 nautical mile buffer zone" and "a strict ban on foreign security forces on the outer islands".

Mauritius retains title to the land and territorial sea and the powers not delegated, including civil and criminal jurisdiction over its nationals and people not connected with the base, the issue of coins and stamps, and the registration of their births, deaths and marriages; the United Kingdom has the jurisdiction "necessary to administer and operate the Base". Mauritius may resettle the islands other than Diego Garcia. The United Kingdom is to pay Mauritius £165 million a year for three years and £120 million a year thereafter, indexed to inflation from the fourteenth year, as well as £40 million for a Chagossian trust fund and £45 million a year for 25 years for development. It would keep responsibility for the environmental protection of the Ramsar site on Diego Garcia, and a Joint Commission, whose decisions require the agreement of both parties, would oversee the treaty.

=== Positions of the United Kingdom and the United States ===
The British government argued that the treaty was needed to protect the base: Starmer said that without it the United Kingdom "would not have a realistic prospect of success" if Mauritius went to court again, and the Defence Secretary, John Healey, that "within just a few years the base would become inoperable". The Conservative leader, Kemi Badenoch, called the agreement a "surrender", and the shadow defence secretary, James Cartlidge, described the fear of binding rulings as "overblown". On its signature the State Department commended the two governments' "commitment to ensure that Diego Garcia remains fully operational for the duration of this agreement". In January 2026, however, Trump called the transfer "an act of GREAT STUPIDITY", and in February, after the reported British refusal to allow strikes on Iran from the base, he wrote: "DO NOT GIVE AWAY DIEGO GARCIA!" According to The Daily Telegraph, "The row over Diego Garcia led the president to withdraw his support" for the treaty.

=== Status in November 2026 ===
In April 2026 the government said that the update to the 1966 exchange of notes had become "impossible to agree at political level", and the implementing bill lapsed on 29 April. Andy Burnham succeeded Starmer as prime minister in July; on 1 September a Foreign Office minister said that "the US Government must be content with the agreement before we proceed in ratifying the treaty", and after meeting Burnham on 22 September Trump said that he expected him to reconsider the "terrible deal". On 13 October a minister told the House of Lords that an agreement with Mauritius "must protect UK interests and command US support", and that "We will return to the Bill in due course." On 27 October the Foreign Secretary, Ed Miliband, told the Commons that "under this US Administration, we will not get consent for the current arrangements", but that the government continued "to work with the US and Mauritius to safeguard our security interests". Burnham and Ramgoolam met during the leaders' retreat at the Commonwealth Heads of Government Meeting in Antigua on 4 November 2026; according to Downing Street they agreed "to work on a shared plan to make further progress by the end of the year", and Ramgoolam's office said that he had stressed the need for a clear roadmap with a first deadline in December 2026. Returning from the summit, Burnham told The Economist that the government was in discussion with the United States "to see how we might recast the arrangement that better meets their concerns", and said of the agreement reached over Greenland: "maybe there is something there we can take from that". The Mauritian government, which has said that it is exploring legal avenues, describes its sovereignty as "non-negotiable"; as of November 2026 the treaty had not entered into force.

== Military facilities ==
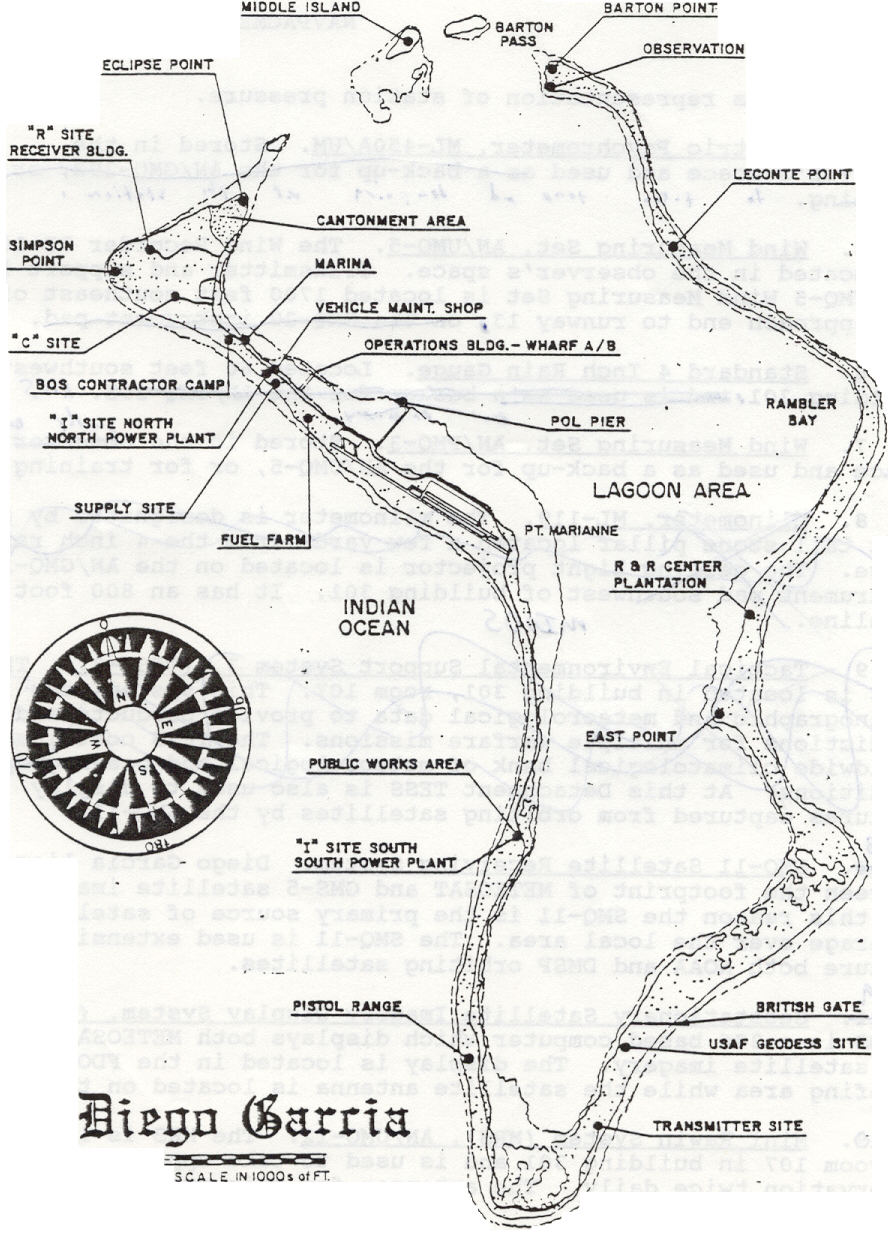
Map of Diego Garcia and its facilities from a US Navy handbook, about 2002

The joint British–American base, now known as Naval Support Facility Diego Garcia, occupies the western arm of the atoll. It was laid out in the 1970s around two antenna farms about 27 km apart, with the cantonment near the receiving site in the north and the airfield, whose runway is about 3,700 metres (12,100 ft) long, between them. Ships enter the lagoon through a dredged channel and berth at a deep-draft wharf about 2 nautical miles south-south-east of Eclipse Point, or at a fuel and supply pier beyond it. The British government describes the base, which has an airfield, a deep-water port able to berth nuclear-powered submarines, a logistics hub, and communications and surveillance facilities, as "strategically critical". In 2007 a squadron of 11 American pre-positioning ships was permanently assigned to the lagoon.

The island also hosts one of the ground antennas of the Global Positioning System, a telescope site of the Ground-based Electro-Optical Deep Space Surveillance system and a hydroacoustic station for monitoring the Comprehensive Nuclear-Test-Ban Treaty. The base has been used for American and British operations in the Gulf War of 1990–91, in Afghanistan and Iraq and against the Islamic State.

== Controversies ==
=== Rendition flights and detention allegations ===
In June 2004 the Foreign Secretary, Jack Straw, told Parliament that the American authorities had "repeatedly assured us that no detainees have at any time passed in transit through Diego Garcia or its territorial waters or have disembarked there", and that the government was satisfied that the assurances were correct. Allegations that the Central Intelligence Agency had held prisoners on or near the island nevertheless persisted. A retired American general, Barry McCaffrey, twice spoke publicly in 2004 and 2006 of detainees being held on Diego Garcia, and in 2007 the Swiss senator Dick Marty reported to the Council of Europe: "We have received concurring confirmations that United States agencies have used Diego Garcia, which is the international legal responsibility of the UK, in the 'processing' of high-value detainees."

On 21 February 2008 the Foreign Secretary, David Miliband, told the House of Commons: "Contrary to earlier explicit assurances that Diego Garcia had not been used for rendition flights, recent US investigations have now revealed two occasions, both in 2002, when that had in fact occurred." In both cases, he said, an American plane with a single detainee on board had refuelled at Diego Garcia; the detainees had not left the plane, and the United States had assured the government that "no US detainees have ever been held on Diego Garcia". The United Nations special rapporteur on torture, Manfred Nowak, said in March 2008 that he had received credible evidence that detainees had been held on the island in 2002 and 2003, and the legal charity Reprieve alleged that prisoners had been held on American ships serviced from the atoll; McCaffrey had by then retracted his claims. In July 2008 Time quoted an unnamed former senior American official as saying that in 2002 and possibly 2003 the United States had held and interrogated one or more terrorism suspects on the island; the CIA said that its position had not changed since February 2008. In 2015 Lawrence Wilkerson, formerly chief of staff to the Secretary of State Colin Powell, said that three intelligence sources had told him that the CIA had used Diego Garcia as "a transit site where people were temporarily housed, let us say, and interrogated from time to time". The British government maintained that the American authorities had assured it that no detainees had been held on the island.

=== The 2009 embassy cable ===
A United States embassy cable of 15 May 2009, published by WikiLeaks in 2010, recorded the BIOT Commissioner, Colin Roberts, as saying that "establishing a marine park would, in effect, put paid to resettlement claims of the archipelago's former residents", having assured his American counterparts that it would "in no way impinge" on the United States' use of the territory. In later litigation Roberts accepted that he had said this, describing it as "a recognition of a reality", but denied using the phrase "Man Fridays" that the cable attributed to him. In 2018 the Supreme Court held the cable admissible in evidence but found, by five to two, that it would not have altered the finding that the Foreign Secretary had no improper motive in creating the marine protected area.

=== Environmental concerns ===
In 2012 Sheppard and colleagues described Diego Garcia, on the basis of pollutant monitoring, as "the least polluted inhabited atoll in the world". In March 2014, however, the Foreign Office minister Mark Simmonds told Parliament that American vessels moored in the lagoon had been discharging waste water, including treated sewage, since the early 1980s, contrary to British policy; British scientists had concluded in 2013 that there were "elevated levels of nutrients in the lagoon which could be damaging to coral", and he announced a three-year plan for the United States to retrofit its vessels. The Independent reported that a report by the territory's environmental adviser had described the British patrol vessel Pacific Marlin as "a regular culprit in terms of sewage discharge" while docked at the island. A government survey of the atoll's waters in March 2019 found pollution generally low, but levels of nutrients, oxygen deficiency, chemical contaminants and heavy metals at some sites in the slowly flushed lagoon that its authors considered a concern. Fuel from a leak found at the airfield in 1991 had to be diverted away from the drinking-water wells.

== Transport and services ==
The container ship SLNC Corsica in the lagoon, January 2020

Diego Garcia has an airfield and a deep-water port, both part of the military base. There are no commercial flights and no public access: travel requires a permit in advance, and access to Diego Garcia is limited to people connected with the military facility or the administration. Under the 1966 agreement, commercial aircraft may use military airfields in the territory only exceptionally, with British permission. Food, fuel and other supplies are brought in by sea or by military aircraft. In 2007 a chartered container ship, known as the "DGAR shuttle", delivered 250 containers a month, "carrying everything from fresh food to building supplies to aircraft parts", more than 200,000 tons of cargo a year, while chartered tankers delivered aviation and diesel fuel up to five times a year.

Telephone, broadband internet, mobile and television rebroadcasting services are provided by Sure (Diego Garcia) Limited, formerly Cable & Wireless, which says that it has operated on the island since 1982 under a licence from the British government; the International Telecommunication Union assigns the code +246 to Diego Garcia. The island has no hospital-grade health facility, and workers and military personnel who become seriously ill are usually flown to Singapore.

== See also ==
- Diego Garcia (novel)
- List of islands in the Chagos Archipelago
- List of United States military bases
- Stealing a Nation

== Sources ==
=== Treaties and official documents ===
- Memorandum of U.K./U.S. London Discussions: U.S. Defence Interests in the Indian Ocean (PDF). 27 February 1964. TNA FCO 31/3437 – via ICJ Annex 25.
- Biden, Joe (3 October 2024). "Statement on the Agreement Between Mauritius and the United Kingdom on the Status of the Chagos Archipelago". The American Presidency Project.
- "About". British Indian Ocean Territory Administration.
- "Governance". British Indian Ocean Territory Administration.
- "Stamps and Coins". British Indian Ocean Territory Administration.
- "Terrestrial Protected Areas". British Indian Ocean Territory Administration.
- "Visiting". British Indian Ocean Territory Administration.
- "BIOT Turtle Leaflet" (PDF) (Leaflet). British Indian Ocean Territory Administration. 2016.
- "Remembrance Day 2019". British Indian Ocean Territory Administration. 11 November 2019.
- "British Overseas Territories Act 2002 (c. 8)". legislation.gov.uk.
- "About". Naval Support Facility Diego Garcia. Commander, Navy Region Japan, United States Navy. Archived from the original on 27 November 2024.
- "The British Indian Ocean Territory (Constitution) Order 2004" (PDF). British Indian Ocean Territory Administration. 10 June 2004.
- "The Courts Ordinance 1983 (Revised Ordinances of the British Indian Ocean Territory, c. B.1), revised edition showing the law as at 1 September 2020" (PDF). British Indian Ocean Territory Administration.
- "Klimatafel von Diego Garcia, Chagos-Archipel / Indischer Ozean / Großbritannien" [Climate table of Diego Garcia, Chagos Archipelago, Indian Ocean, United Kingdom] (PDF) (in German). Deutscher Wetterdienst.
- Duncan, Alan (16 November 2016). "Update on the British Indian Ocean Territory (HCWS260)". UK Parliament: Written questions, answers and statements.
- Duncan, Alan (30 April 2019). "British Indian Ocean Territory (HCWS1528)". UK Parliament: Written questions, answers and statements.
- Healey, John (22 May 2025). Defence Secretary oral statement on Diego Garcia (Speech). House of Commons.
- "The British Indian Ocean Territory (Immigration) Order 2004" (PDF). British Indian Ocean Territory Administration. 10 June 2004.
- List of Recommendation ITU-T E.164 assigned country codes (position on 15 December 2016) (PDF) (Report). Annex to ITU Operational Bulletin No. 1114. International Telecommunication Union. 15 December 2016.
- "Change at the helm for MSC's Diego Garcia office" (Press release). Military Sealift Command. 8 November 2007. Archived from the original on 6 August 2011.
- "Tsunami event: 30 November 1983, Chagos Archipelago region". Global Historical Tsunami Database. National Centers for Environmental Information. doi:10.7289/V5PN93H7.
- Naval Computer and Telecommunications Station Far East Detachment Diego Garcia (January 2011). "Welcome Aboard" (PDF). United States Navy. Archived from the original (PDF) on 5 October 2016.
- Newton, Robert (1964). Report on the Anglo-American Survey in the Indian Ocean (PDF) (Report). TNA CO 1036/1332 – via Memorial of Mauritius, Annex 2.
- National Geospatial-Intelligence Agency (2026). Sailing Directions (Enroute): East Africa and the South Indian Ocean (PDF). Pub. 171 (15th ed.). Springfield, Virginia: National Geospatial-Intelligence Agency.
- Diego Garcia Integrated Natural Resources Management Plan (Report). U.S. Navy Support Facility Diego Garcia; Naval Facilities Engineering Command, Pacific. September 2005. Archived from the original on 7 February 2026.
- "PM meetings with world leaders at CHOGM" (Press release). Prime Minister's Office, 10 Downing Street. 5 November 2026.
- Joint Nature Conservation Committee (February 2001). Ramsar Information Sheet: Diego Garcia (PDF) (Report). Ramsar Sites Information Service.
- "Diego Garcia". Ramsar Sites Information Service. Secretariat of the Convention on Wetlands.
- "The Road Traffic Ordinance 1998 (Revised Ordinances of the British Indian Ocean Territory, c. H.1), revised edition showing the law as at 1 September 2020" (PDF). British Indian Ocean Territory Administration.
- Simmonds, Mark (6 March 2014). "Minister for Africa updates Parliament on Diego Garcia" (Written statement to Parliament). Foreign and Commonwealth Office.
- Starmer, Keir (22 May 2025). PM's remarks at press conference on Diego Garcia: 22 May 2025 (Speech). London.
- "About Us". Sure (Diego Garcia) Limited.
- Torikai, Jill D. (1998). Status of ground-water resources at U.S. Navy Support Facility, Diego Garcia: summary of hydrologic and climatic data, January 1995 through September 1997 (PDF) (Report). Open-File Report. Honolulu: United States Geological Survey. doi:10.3133/ofr981.
- "UK secures future of vital Diego Garcia Military Base to protect national security" (Press release). Ministry of Defence and Foreign, Commonwealth and Development Office. 22 May 2025.
- Permanent Mission of the United Kingdom to the United Nations (19 January 2023). Note No. 004/23 to the Secretary-General, with the Written Ministerial Statement of 3 November 2022 (PDF) (Report). United Nations.
- Agreement between the Government of the United Kingdom of Great Britain and Northern Ireland and the Government of the Republic of Mauritius concerning the Chagos Archipelago including Diego Garcia (CS Mauritius No.1/2025, CP 1334) (Report). Foreign, Commonwealth and Development Office. 22 May 2025.
- "UK and Mauritius joint statement, 3 October 2024" (Press release). Foreign, Commonwealth and Development Office. 3 October 2024.
- Exchange of notes constituting an agreement supplementing the above-mentioned agreement, concerning a United States naval support facility on Diego Garcia, British Indian Ocean Territory and replacing the supplementary agreement of 24 October 1972. London, 25 February 1976 (PDF). United Nations Treaty Series. Vol. 1018. United Nations. 1976. pp. 372–381.
- Exchange of notes constituting an agreement concerning the British Indian Ocean Territory and operations and construction contracts on Diego Garcia. Washington, 16 November 1987 (No. 27519) (PDF). United Nations Treaty Series. Vol. 1576. United Nations. 1990. pp. 179–183.
- Supplemental arrangement to the above-mentioned agreement relating to the Agreement of 25 February 1976 on the Diego Garcia facility. Signed at Washington on 13 December 1982 (PDF). United Nations Treaty Series. Vol. 2001. United Nations. 1998. pp. 397–400.
- Exchange of notes between the Government of the United Kingdom of Great Britain and Northern Ireland and the Government of the United States of America concerning the construction of a monitoring facility on Diego Garcia, British Indian Ocean Territory (British Indian Ocean Territory Agreement 1999). London, 18 June 1999 and 21 July 1999 (No. 36627) (PDF). United Nations Treaty Series. Vol. 2106. United Nations. 2000.
- Exchange of notes constituting an agreement between the Government of the United Kingdom of Great Britain and Northern Ireland and the Government of the United States of America concerning the availability for defence purposes of the British Indian Ocean Territory. London, 30 December 1966 (No. 8737) (PDF). United Nations Treaty Series. Vol. 603. United Nations. 1967. pp. 273–290. Also published as UK Treaty Series No. 15 (1967), Cmnd 3231; 18 UST 28; TIAS 6196.
- Exchange of notes constituting an agreement supplementing the above-mentioned agreement concerning a limited United States naval communications facility on Diego Garcia, British Indian Ocean Territory. London, 24 October 1972 (PDF). United Nations Treaty Series. Vol. 866. United Nations. 1973. pp. 302–307.
- "U.S. Support for UK and Mauritius Agreement On Chagos Archipelago" (Press release). United States Department of State. 22 May 2025 – via AllAfrica.
- Office of the Chief of Naval Operations (1970). "39. Paper Prepared in the Office of the Chief of Naval Operations (Moorer): Diego Garcia—Background and Status, 11 February 1970". Foreign Relations of the United States, 1969–1976, Volume XXIV, Middle East Region and Arabian Peninsula, 1969–1972; Jordan, September 1970. Office of the Historian, United States Department of State.
- "M 7.3 – Chagos Archipelago region, 30 November 1983". Earthquake Hazards Program. United States Geological Survey.
- "British Indian Ocean Territory". The World Factbook. Central Intelligence Agency. Archived from the original on 2 December 2025.

=== Parliamentary material ===
- "Diego Garcia Military Base and British Indian Ocean Territory Bill". Hansard, House of Commons. 13 April 2026.
- "UK-Mauritius Chagos Treaty: Future Spending". Hansard, House of Commons. 1 September 2026.
- "Diego Garcia Military Base and British Indian Ocean Territory Bill". Hansard, House of Lords. 13 October 2026.
- "Topical Questions". Hansard, House of Commons. 27 October 2026.
- "Diego Garcia". Hansard, House of Commons (Written Answers). 5 February 1974. HC Deb 5 February 1974 vol 868 cc276–277W.
- "Diego Garcia". Hansard, House of Commons. 20 March 1974. HC Deb 20 March 1974 vol 870 cc1267–1277.
- "Terrorist Suspects (Renditions)". Hansard, House of Commons. 21 February 2008.
- "Middle East". Hansard, House of Commons. 23 March 2026.
- "Diego Garcia: Consultation with United States". Hansard, House of Lords. 25 October 1983. HL Deb 25 October 1983 vol 444 cc129–130.
- Loft, Philip; Curtis, John (8 September 2025). 2025 treaty on the British Indian Ocean Territory/Chagos Archipelago (Report). Research Briefing CBP-10273. House of Commons Library.
- Straw, Jack (21 June 2004). "Diego Garcia/Chagos Islands (written answers 178580 and 178581)". Hansard, House of Commons. Archived from the original on 13 May 2006.

=== Court decisions and pleadings ===
- R v Secretary of State for the Foreign and Commonwealth Office, ex parte Bancoult, EWHC (Admin) 413 (High Court (Divisional Court) 3 November 2000).
- R (Bancoult) v Secretary of State for Foreign and Commonwealth Affairs, EWHC (Admin) 1038 (High Court (Divisional Court) 11 May 2006).
- R (Bancoult) v Secretary of State for Foreign and Commonwealth Affairs (No 2), UKHL 61 (House of Lords 22 October 2008).
- R (Bancoult) v Secretary of State for Foreign and Commonwealth Affairs, EWCA Civ 708 (Court of Appeal 23 May 2014).
- R (Bancoult) v Secretary of State for Foreign and Commonwealth Affairs, EWHC (Admin) 1502 (High Court (Divisional Court) 11 June 2013).
- R (Bancoult No 3) v Secretary of State for Foreign and Commonwealth Affairs, UKSC 3 (Supreme Court 8 February 2018).
- Bancoult v. McNamara, 445 F.3d 427 (D.C. Cir. 21 April 2006).
- Chagos Islanders v Attorney General and HM BIOT Commissioner, EWHC (QB) 2222 (High Court 9 October 2003).
- Chagos Islanders v United Kingdom, Application no. 35622/04 (European Court of Human Rights 11 December 2012).
- Legal Consequences of the Separation of the Chagos Archipelago from Mauritius in 1965, Advisory Opinion (PDF). I.C.J. Reports 2019. International Court of Justice. 25 February 2019. p. 95.
- Dispute concerning delimitation of the maritime boundary between Mauritius and Maldives in the Indian Ocean (Mauritius/Maldives), Preliminary Objections, Judgment (PDF). ITLOS Reports 2020–2021. International Tribunal for the Law of the Sea. 28 January 2021. p. 17.
- R (Mandarin and others) v HM Commissioner for the British Indian Ocean Territory: Order (Supreme Court of the British Indian Ocean Territory 31 March 2026), Text.
- R (Mandarin and others) v HM Commissioner for the British Indian Ocean Territory (Supreme Court of the British Indian Ocean Territory 31 March 2026), Text.
- Memorial of the Republic of Mauritius: Annexes 1–80 (PDF). Vol. II. Permanent Court of Arbitration. 1 August 2012. Page numbers are those of the PDF volume. Includes R. Newton, Report on the Anglo-American Survey in the Indian Ocean (1964, Annex 2); FCO, British Indian Ocean Territory 1964–1968: Chronological Summary of Events (Annex 3); and correspondence on the 1972 payment (Annexes 66–69).
- Memorial of the Republic of Mauritius. Vol. I. Permanent Court of Arbitration. 1 August 2012.
- Written Statement of the Republic of Mauritius (PDF). Vol. I. International Court of Justice. 1 March 2018.
- In the Matter of the Chagos Marine Protected Area Arbitration (Mauritius v. United Kingdom): Award (PDF). Permanent Court of Arbitration. 18 March 2015.
- Robinson, Patrick (25 February 2019). "Separate opinion of Judge Robinson" (PDF). Legal Consequences of the Separation of the Chagos Archipelago from Mauritius in 1965, Advisory Opinion. I.C.J. Reports 2019. International Court of Justice. p. 294.
- Tomka, Peter (25 February 2019). "Declaration of Judge Tomka" (PDF). Legal Consequences of the Separation of the Chagos Archipelago from Mauritius in 1965, Advisory Opinion. I.C.J. Reports 2019. International Court of Justice. p. 148.
- Counter-Memorial of the United Kingdom. Permanent Court of Arbitration. 15 July 2013.
- Written Statement of the United Kingdom (PDF). International Court of Justice. 15 February 2018.
- The Commissioner for the British Indian Ocean Territory v The King (on the application of VT and others) (Judicial Review: Unlawful Detention) (Rev 1), BIOT CA (Civ) 1 (British Indian Ocean Territory Court of Appeal 16 December 2025).
- The King (on the application of VT (Sri Lanka) and others) v The Commissioner for the British Indian Ocean Territory (Supreme Court of the British Indian Ocean Territory 16 December 2024), Text.

=== United Nations documents ===
- Committee on the Elimination of Racial Discrimination (2 December 2025). Decision 1 (2025): Mauritius and the United Kingdom (early warning and urgent action procedure, INT/CERD/EWU/11263), advance unedited version (Report). Office of the United Nations High Commissioner for Human Rights.
- United Nations General Assembly (22 June 2017). Resolution adopted by the General Assembly on 22 June 2017: 71/292. Request for an advisory opinion of the International Court of Justice on the legal consequences of the separation of the Chagos Archipelago from Mauritius in 1965 (A/RES/71/292) (Report). United Nations.
- United Nations General Assembly (24 May 2019). Resolution adopted by the General Assembly on 22 May 2019: 73/295. Advisory opinion of the International Court of Justice on the legal consequences of the separation of the Chagos Archipelago from Mauritius in 1965 (A/RES/73/295) (Report). United Nations.

=== Books and journals ===
- Bourne, W. R. P. (1971). "The birds of the Chagos Group, Indian Ocean". Atoll Research Bulletin (149). Smithsonian Institution: 175–207.
- Carr, Peter; et al. (March 2021). "Status and phenology of breeding seabirds and a review of Important Bird and Biodiversity Areas in the British Indian Ocean Territory". Bird Conservation International. 31 (1): 14–34. doi:10.1017/S0959270920000295. hdl:10871/122331.
- Clubbe, Colin; et al. (January 2025). "Plants of the Chagos Archipelago" (PDF). Chagos News. No. 62. Chagos Conservation Trust. pp. 6–9. ISSN 2046-7222.
- Cumberlidge, N. (2020). "Birgus latro". IUCN Red List of Threatened Species. 2020 e.T2811A126813586. doi:10.2305/IUCN.UK.2020-2.RLTS.T2811A126813586.en.
- Dumbraveanu, D.; Sheppard, Charles (n.d.). "Substrate area estimates at different depths for the Chagos Archipelago". Chagos Information Portal (Dataset). Chagos Conservation Trust.
- Dunne, Richard P.; Barbosa, Susana M.; Woodworth, Philip L. (February 2012). "Contemporary sea level in the Chagos Archipelago, central Indian Ocean". Global and Planetary Change. 82–83: 25–37. doi:10.1016/j.gloplacha.2011.11.009.
- Edis, Richard (1993). Peak of Limuria: The Story of Diego Garcia (PDF). London: Bellew Publishing. ISBN 1-85725-070-2 – via Written Statement of the Republic of Mauritius (ICJ), vol. IV, Annex 136 (extracts).
- Hamylton, Sarah; East, Holly (November 2012). "A geospatial appraisal of ecological and geomorphic change on Diego Garcia Atoll, Chagos Islands (British Indian Ocean Territory)". Remote Sensing. 4 (11): 3444–3461. doi:10.3390/rs4113444.
- Harper, G. A.; Carr, P.; Pitman, H. (2019). "Eradicating black rats from the Chagos – working towards the whole archipelago" (PDF). In Veitch, C. R.; Clout, M. N.; Martin, A. R.; Russell, J. C.; West, C. J. (eds.). Island invasives: scaling up to meet the challenge. Occasional Paper of the IUCN Species Survival Commission no. 62. Gland: IUCN. pp. 26–30.
- Hays, Graeme C.; et al. (December 2014). "Use of long-distance migration patterns of an endangered species to inform conservation planning for the world's largest marine protected area". Conservation Biology. 28 (6): 1636–1644. doi:10.1111/cobi.12325.
- Hays, Graeme C.; et al. (October 2021). "High accuracy tracking reveals how small conservation areas can protect marine megafauna". Ecological Applications. 31 (7) e02418. doi:10.1002/eap.2418.
- Mücke, Hellmuth von (1917). The "Emden". Translated by Helene S. White. Boston: Ritter & Company.
- Mortimer, Jeanne A.; et al. (May 2020). "Estimates of marine turtle nesting populations in the south-west Indian Ocean indicate the importance of the Chagos Archipelago". Oryx. 54 (3): 332–343. doi:10.1017/S0030605319001108.
- Nagarajan, B.; Suresh, I.; Sundar, D.; Sharma, R.; et al. (2006). "The Great Tsunami of 26 December 2004: a description based on tide-gauge data from the Indian subcontinent and surrounding areas". Earth, Planets and Space. 58 (2): 211–215. doi:10.1186/BF03353380.
- Painting, Suzanne J.; et al. (July 2021). "Marine water quality at Diego Garcia: a preliminary study of pollution levels in coastal and lagoon waters". Frontiers in Marine Science. 8 671319. doi:10.3389/fmars.2021.671319.
- Peyton, Jodey; et al. (January 2025). "New invertebrate discoveries on Diego Garcia" (PDF). Chagos News. No. 62. Chagos Conservation Trust. pp. 10–12. ISSN 2046-7222.
- Sand, Peter H. (2018). "The British Indian Ocean Territory: International Legal Black Hole?" (PDF). Zoom-out. Questions of International Law. 55: 35–59.
- Sheppard, C. R. C.; et al. (March 2012). "Reefs and islands of the Chagos Archipelago, Indian Ocean: why it is the world's largest no-take marine protected area". Aquatic Conservation: Marine and Freshwater Ecosystems. 22 (2): 232–261. doi:10.1002/aqc.1248. PMC 4260629. PMID 25505830.
- Sheppard, Charles (19 March 2014). "Atoll rim expansion or erosion in Diego Garcia Atoll, Indian Ocean? Comment on Hamylton, S.; East, H. A geospatial appraisal of ecological and geomorphic change on Diego Garcia Atoll, Chagos Islands (British Indian Ocean Territory). Remote Sens. 2012, 4, 3444–3461". Remote Sensing. 6 (3): 2463–2467. doi:10.3390/rs6032463.
- Sheppard, Charles; et al. (November 2017). "Coral bleaching and mortality in the Chagos Archipelago". Atoll Research Bulletin (613): 1–26. doi:10.5479/si.0077-5630.613.
- Sheppard, Charles; Topp, John (n.d.). "Plant distribution across 59 islands in Chagos over 21 years". Chagos Information Portal (Dataset). Chagos Conservation Trust.
- Spalding, Mark; Bourasseau, Marion (January 2025). Coral bleaching and mortality in the Chagos Archipelago, 2024 (PDF) (Report). British Indian Ocean Territory Administration.
- Stoddart, D. R. (1971). "Settlement and development of Diego Garcia". Atoll Research Bulletin (149). Smithsonian Institution: 209–217.
- Stoddart, D. R. (1971b). "Geomorphology of Diego Garcia Atoll". Atoll Research Bulletin (149). Smithsonian Institution: 7–26.
- Stoddart, D. R. (1971c). "Diego Garcia climate and marine environment". Atoll Research Bulletin (149). Smithsonian Institution: 27–30.
- Stoddart, D. R. (1971d). "Land vegetation of Diego Garcia". Atoll Research Bulletin (149). Smithsonian Institution: 127–142.
- Stoddart, D. R. (1971e). "Terrestrial fauna of Diego Garcia and other Chagos atolls". Atoll Research Bulletin (149). Smithsonian Institution: 163–170.
- Vialard, J.; Duvel, J. P.; McPhaden, M. J.; Bouruet-Aubertot, P.; et al. (January 2009). "Cirene: air–sea interactions in the Seychelles–Chagos thermocline ridge region". Bulletin of the American Meteorological Society. 90 (1): 45–61. doi:10.1175/2008BAMS2499.1.
- Vine, David (2009). Island of Shame: The Secret History of the U.S. Military Base on Diego Garcia (PDF). Princeton University Press. ISBN 978-0-691-13869-5 – via Written Statement of the Republic of Mauritius (ICJ), vol. V, Annex 151 (extracts).

=== News and other sources ===
- "Iran targeted but did not hit Diego Garcia base in Indian Ocean with missiles – report". Ada Derana. Reuters. 21 March 2026.
- "'False flag attack': Iran denies claims it fired missiles at Diego Garcia". Al Jazeera English. 23 March 2026.
- Arjanee, Ameerah (2 October 2026). "UK-Mauritius Chagos sovereignty deal stalls amid fears of further delays". Al Jazeera English.
- Badshah, Nadeem; Ofori, Morgan (21 March 2026). "UK foreign secretary condemns Iran's 'reckless threats' after strike towards US-UK base". The Guardian.
- "Eastern Diego Garcia island group". BirdLife Data Zone. BirdLife International.
- Brock, Joe (6 July 2023). "Inside the subsea cable firm secretly helping America take on China". Reuters. Archived from the original on 4 December 2023.
- "Transcript: NATO Secretary General Mark Rutte on "Face the Nation with Margaret Brennan," March 22, 2026". Face the Nation. CBS News. 22 March 2026.
- "Coconut crabs". Chagos Conservation Trust. Archived from the original on 5 July 2012.
- Cobain, Ian (30 January 2015). "CIA interrogated suspects on Diego Garcia, says Colin Powell aide". The Guardian.
- Cobain, Ian; Norton-Taylor, Richard (19 October 2007). "Claims of secret CIA jail for terror suspects on British island to be investigated". The Guardian.
- Cuddy, Alice (19 January 2024). "Diego Garcia: UN says UK military island not suitable for stranded migrants". BBC News.
- "Dossier Chagos : tête-à-tête entre Navin Ramgoolam et son homologue britannique, Andy Burnham" [Chagos file: one-to-one meeting between Navin Ramgoolam and his British counterpart, Andy Burnham]. Le Défi Media (in French). 5 November 2026.
- Doward, Jamie (2 March 2008). "British island 'used by US for rendition'". The Observer.
- Foster, Scott; Windrem, Robert (4 January 2005). "Tsunami spares U.S. base in Diego Garcia". NBC News.
- "Ile Maurice: Navin Ramgoolam et Andy Burnham visent une feuille de route d'ici décembre" [Mauritius: Navin Ramgoolam and Andy Burnham aim for a roadmap by December]. L'Express (in French). 5 November 2026 – via allAfrica.
- Lateef, Samaan (5 March 2026). "Mauritius to sue Britain over Chagos delay". The Daily Telegraph – via Yahoo News.
- Lawless, Jill (20 January 2026). "Trump slams UK deal to hand over Chagos Islands after he previously supported it". PBS News Hour. Associated Press.
- Lendon, Brad (20 February 2026). "Diego Garcia: Britain blocking use of air bases Trump says would be needed for strikes on Iran, UK media report". CNN.
- Lynch, David (5 November 2026). "Andy Burnham wants progress on Chagos Islands stalemate 'by the end of the year'". Express & Star. PA Media.
- Mallinder, Lorraine (11 February 2025). "'Tug of war': Chagos Islands deal tearing families apart in Mauritius". Al Jazeera English.
- McQue, Katie (9 June 2024). "Migrant workers 'fear for their safety' after deaths on Diego Garcia". The Observer.
- Milmo, Cahal (28 March 2014). "Exclusive: British Government under fire for pollution of pristine lagoon". The Independent.
- Ormiston, Simon (23 September 2026). "UK to review Chagos deal after Trump tells Burnham it is 'terrible'". Euronews.
- Peerthum, Satyendra (16 October 2018). "The Story of the Settlement of Diego Garcia and the Chagos Archipelago". Le Mauricien.
- Riñoza, Jojo (16 September 2022). "Philippines: Filipino workers stuck at US military base following dispute over vacation". BenarNews.
- "Chagossian activists challenge legality of new bilateral agreement". Seychelles Nation. 10 June 2025.
- Schiller, Markus (1 April 2026). "What does the reported attack on Diego Garcia tell us about Iran's missile capabilities? A Q&A with Dr Markus Schiller". Stockholm International Peace Research Institute.
- Stacey, Kiran (5 November 2026). "Burnham wants to 'recast' Chagos Islands deal after US resistance". The Guardian.
- Stringer, Connor (2 March 2026). "Exclusive: Trump – I'm 'very disappointed' in Starmer over Iran". The Daily Telegraph – via Yahoo News.
- Syal, Rajeev (1 September 2022). "Evicted Chagos Islanders' descendants to get British citizenship". The Guardian.
- Zagorin, Adam (31 July 2008). "Source: US Used UK Isle for Interrogations". Time. Archived from the original on 5 August 2008.
