= Diego Garcia Agreement 1976 =

1976 UK–US agreement on the naval support facility on Diego Garcia

Exchange of Notes constituting an Agreement concerning a United States Naval Support Facility on Diego Garcia, British Indian Ocean Territory
- Type: Bilateral defence agreement (exchange of notes)
- Signed: 25 February 1976
- Location: London
- Effective: 25 February 1976
- Condition: Entry into force on the date of the US reply
- Signatories: Roy Hattersley (Minister of State for Foreign and Commonwealth Affairs); Ronald I. Spiers (US chargé d'affaires ad interim)
- Parties: United Kingdom; United States
- Citations: 1018 UNTS 372; UK Treaty Series No. 19 (1976), Cmnd 6413
- Language: English

The Diego Garcia Agreement 1976 is an agreement between the United Kingdom and the United States, made by an exchange of notes in London on 25 February 1976, under which the British government approved the development of the limited American naval communications facility on Diego Garcia, in the British Indian Ocean Territory, into "a support facility of the United States Navy". It supplements the 1966 exchange of notes on the defence use of the territory and replaced the Diego Garcia Agreement of 24 October 1972. It was published as UK Treaty Series No. 19 (1976), Cmnd 6413, and in the United Nations Treaty Series. The facility is now known as Naval Support Facility Diego Garcia.

The agreement defines the scope and purpose of the facility and requires the two governments to consult periodically; apart from the movements of ships and aircraft in normal circumstances, "the use of the facility shall be a matter for the joint decision of the two Governments". It remains in force for as long as the 1966 agreement, which was extended in 2016 until 30 December 2036. British ministers have cited its consultation provisions in Parliament, and in 2026 a defence minister said that all combat operations from the base were subject to joint decision-making.

The British government agreed in principle to the expansion in February 1974, citing the need to balance Soviet activity in the Indian Ocean, and the incoming Labour government confirmed it in December 1974. Several Indian Ocean states objected to the plans, and in the United States Congress made funding conditional on a presidential certification that the facility was essential to the national interest. In 1975 members of both Houses of Parliament complained that information about the base and the removal of the islands' inhabitants had reached them through the United States Congress rather than from the British government.

== Background ==
Under the exchange of notes of 30 December 1966, the islands of the British Indian Ocean Territory were made available for the defence purposes of both governments, and each defence facility required the approval in principle of both governments. By notes exchanged on 24 October 1972 the British government, "Pursuant to paragraph 2 (b)" of the 1966 agreement, approved in principle the construction of "a limited naval communications facility on Diego Garcia". That facility was to consist of transmitting and receiving services, an anchorage, an airfield and personnel accommodation, and its purpose was to provide "a link in United States defence communications" and improved communications support in the Indian Ocean for the ships and aircraft of either government. According to the British government, it began operating early in 1973. The removal of the islands' population was completed in May 1973.

== Negotiation ==
=== Proposals for expansion ===
According to the anthropologist David Vine, by October 1973 the US Navy was using the base to fly P-3 surveillance aircraft in support of Israel during the Yom Kippur War, and within weeks it asked the Pentagon for an expansion of almost $32 million over three years; the Chairman of the Joint Chiefs of Staff, Admiral Thomas Moorer, recommended going further, including a runway extension for B-52 bombers. In January 1974 the US Department of Defense prepared a proposal for an exchange of notes "to permit the broad and generally unrestricted use of Diego Garcia by U.S. forces". On 17 January a British diplomat told American officials that the British government had "no major problem" with upgrading Diego Garcia, that ministers had in mind the need to check Soviet naval expansion and keep the sea lanes open, and that they wanted the agreement to be "a confidential exchange of diplomatic instruments but with both sides acknowledging its existence".

On 5 February 1974 the Conservative government announced in Parliament that, "in accordance with the 1966 Anglo-American Agreement", it had agreed in principle to the expansion of the facilities, involving improvements to the anchorage, the airfield and the shore facilities. The Foreign Office minister Julian Amery stated:

Her Majesty's Government have long felt that it is desirable in the general Western interest to balance increased Soviet activities in the Indian Ocean area. Accordingly, they welcome the expansion of the United States facilities which will also be available for British use.

He added that the two governments would consult periodically on joint objectives, policies and activities in the area, that their representatives on the island would inform each other of the intended movements of ships and aircraft in normal circumstances, and that in other circumstances use of the facilities "would be a matter for the joint decision of the two Governments". A formal agreement was to follow.

=== International reactions ===
The Prime Minister of Sri Lanka, Sirimavo Bandaranaike, wrote to President Richard Nixon expressing her government's "grave anxiety" and "deep concern" over the plans, which the US Secretary of State, Henry Kissinger, attributed to her commitment to a demilitarised "zone of peace" in the Indian Ocean. The draft reply prepared for Nixon said that the decision "does not envisage the basing of military units on the island". In a Commons debate in March 1974 the Labour MP Tam Dalyell listed the public objections of India, Pakistan, Sri Lanka and Indonesia and comments by Australia's Prime Minister, Gough Whitlam, and called Diego Garcia "the thin end of a big wedge". The Foreign Office minister Joan Lestor replied that the governments of the littoral states had been given notice of the announcement, that the Indian government had been kept "well informed", and that the Australian government had said publicly that the arrangements did not contribute to an Indian Ocean peace zone. In April 1974 the Labour MP Frank Hooley asked whether "certain specific pledges" given to Mauritius in 1967 about the non-development of the base would be honoured; the Defence Secretary, Roy Mason, said he would look into the point.

=== Review by the Labour government ===
Ministers of the incoming Labour government reviewed the decision as part of a general review of foreign policy. Lestor told the Commons that the expansion "would be paid for by the Americans" and that the facilities "would be available for British as well as American use", but that the new government had "not been in office long enough to consider the question in any detail". She cited the steady increase of the Soviet naval presence in the Indian Ocean over the previous five years. On 3 December 1974, announcing the results of the government's defence review, Mason said that, given the effects of the review's decisions in the Indian Ocean area, which included withdrawing British forces from Gan and Mauritius, and "the Soviet naval presence there", the government had decided to agree to "a relatively modest expansion of the facilities on the island of Diego Garcia". He added: "Their use of the facilities other than for routine purposes would, however, be a matter for joint decision of the two Governments."

In 1975 Mason told the Commons that the work agreed was additional to that agreed in 1972, that its cost was at most $35 million, and that "there are no plans to base ships or aircraft on Diego Garcia, and there will be no facilities of any kind for nuclear weaponry". In July 1975 he said: "It is not a base. It is only a very austere communications facility for aircraft and ships."

=== United States Congress ===
The expansion required funding from Congress. In April 1974 Mason told the Commons that the Senate Appropriations Committee had "just turned down a proposal to spend $29 million on this expansion". At a meeting with President Gerald Ford in August 1974, the Chief of Naval Operations, Admiral James Holloway, said that sustaining naval deployments in the Indian Ocean was difficult, "that is why we want to see Diego Garcia upgraded", and Kissinger said that the Indian Ocean deployment was "crucial for our foreign policy". According to Vine, the funding became a political contest between the Ford administration and Democratic senators concerned about an arms race with the Soviet Union in the Indian Ocean, and amendments to defeat the expansion and to require arms negotiations were introduced but defeated.

The Military Construction Authorization Act 1975 barred construction until the President certified that a facility on Diego Garcia was "essential to the national interest of the United States", and Ford gave that certification on 12 May 1975. According to Vine, his justification stated that "the oil shipped from the Persian Gulf area is essential to the economic well-being of modern industrial societies". Within the administration, the Defense Secretary, James Schlesinger, argued in July 1975 that evidence of a Soviet base at Berbera in Somalia had left opponents of Diego Garcia "in disarray". In November 1975 the Senate adopted, by 51 votes to 44, an amendment by Senator John Culver delaying the use of $13.8 million of fiscal year 1976 funds until 1 July 1976, while $18.1 million of 1975 funds remained available "when UK approves the expansion agreement".

=== The former inhabitants ===
According to Vine, during House committee hearings a State Department witness, George Vest, described Diego Garcia as "uninhabited" and, asked again, said "No inhabitants". After The Washington Post reported on 9 September 1975 that the islanders had been evicted for the base, Senators Edward Kennedy and Culver proposed an amendment requiring the administration to explain the removals, and in October the administration submitted a report to Congress which said that "All went willingly". On 4 November 1975 a House subcommittee chaired by Lee H. Hamilton questioned a State Department official about the report. Congress held a series of hearings on the base and "the fate of the people removed from the Chagos Archipelago", and members criticised the executive for leaving their fate to the British and Mauritian governments, but it appropriated the funds.

The High Court in London later recorded that press interest in Britain, including a Sunday Times article in September 1975, may have been stimulated by the House subcommittee's hearings. In the Commons in August 1975 the Labour MP Stan Newens complained that information about the military installations and "depopulation on the island" had been made available to Congress but not to the House, and Frank Allaun said: "it is quite clear that we have been misled". In the Lords, Lord Brockway asked why it had been necessary "to rely on Washington for the facts", and Baroness Lee of Asheridge said that "it took an exposure in the American Congress Committees" to give Parliament the information. The minister, Lord Goronwy-Roberts, denied any "deliberate silence", said that Diego Garcia "has not been leased to the United States Government" and that the inhabitants "were not forcibly removed", and said that it had been understood when the territory was created "that there would need to be removal and rehabilitation of the islanders".

== Conclusion ==
On 25 February 1976 the Minister of State for Foreign and Commonwealth Affairs, Roy Hattersley, sent Note No. DPP 063/530/2 to the US chargé d'affaires ad interim, Ronald I. Spiers, conveying, "Pursuant to paragraph 2 (b)" of the 1966 agreement, British approval in principle of the development of the facility and proposing the terms of an agreement. Spiers replied the same day that the US government approved the development "subject to the terms set out in your Note", and the agreement entered into force on that date. Hattersley told the Commons the next day that the agreement had been laid before Parliament, and that it "defines the scope and purpose of the expanded facility and provides for consultation and joint decision on its use". The United Kingdom registered it with the United Nations on 27 July 1976.

== Terms ==
=== Scope and purpose ===
Paragraph (1) gave the United States the right "to develop the present limited naval communications facility on Diego Garcia as a support facility of the United States Navy and to maintain and operate it". The facility was to "consist of an anchorage, airfield, support and supply elements and ancillary services, personnel accommodation, and transmitting and receiving services". Immovable structures could be built, after consultation with the British authorities, within a "specific area" shown on a plan annexed to the note; outside it, American forces and contractor personnel had freedom of access, but building required prior British agreement. The British government kept the right to build and operate its own defence facilities at its own expense. Under paragraph (2): "The facility shall provide an improved link in United States defence communications, and furnish support for ships and aircraft owned or operated by or on behalf of either Government."

=== Consultation and joint decision ===
Paragraph (3), which had no counterpart in the 1972 agreement, reads:

Both Governments shall consult periodically on joint objectives, policies and activities in the area. As regards the use of the facility in normal circumstances, the Commanding Officer and the Officer in Charge of the United Kingdom Service element shall inform each other of intended movements of ships and aircraft. In other circumstances the use of the facility shall be a matter for the joint decision of the two Governments.

The "Commanding Officer" is the US Navy officer in command of the facility. Responsibility for its protection and security lay with him, in close liaison with the Commissioner of the territory, and the governments were to consult if the facility was threatened.

=== Access and use ===
As in 1972, access to Diego Garcia was in general restricted to the forces of the two countries, the territory's Commissioner and officials, representatives of the two governments and, subject to immigration requirements, contractor personnel; scientific parties could be admitted by the British government after consultation, and "Access shall not be granted to any other person without prior consultation between the appropriate administrative authorities of the two Governments." The High Court observed in 2003 that the 1976 notes repeated "the same provisions as to who could go to the islands". Ships and aircraft of either government could freely use the anchorage and airfield, without dues or charges for American ones, while third-country ships and aircraft could use the facility's services only as agreed by both governments in each case.

=== Other provisions ===
The United States was to "bear the cost of developing, operating and maintaining the facility", while the United Kingdom paid for its own personnel; activities depending on funds appropriated by Congress were subject to their availability. The British government undertook not to permit commercial fishing in the lagoon or oil or mineral exploration on Diego Garcia, nor in the surrounding waters and seabed unless it was agreed that this would not harm the island's defence use; the High Court noted in 2013 that the 1966 notes had "made no reference at all to fishing". The United States was to run a meteorological facility and supply information needed by the British government and the Government of Mauritius. The activities of the facility were as far as possible not to interfere with the island's flora and fauna, and the governments were to consult about restoring the three islets at the mouth of the lagoon once they were no longer needed, though neither was obliged to pay for it.

The British forces on the island, the "United Kingdom Service element", were placed under a Royal Navy officer known as the Officer-in-Charge, and the Commissioner was to designate a representative on Diego Garcia; under the 1972 agreement the Royal Navy officer had been the Commissioner's representative. Supplementary arrangements could be made between the administrative authorities, and questions of interpretation were to be settled by consultation.

=== Relationship to the 1966 and 1972 agreements ===
The agreement supplements the 1966 agreement, called the "BIOT Agreement", and is to be construed in accordance with it: "In the event of any conflict between the provisions of the BIOT Agreement and this Agreement the provisions of the BIOT Agreement shall prevail." Paragraph (21), headed "The Diego Garcia Agreement 1972", provides: "This Agreement shall replace the Agreement constituted by the Exchange of Notes dated 24 October 1972", which concerned "a limited United States naval communication facility on Diego Garcia". Under paragraph (22), the agreement "shall continue in force for as long as the BIOT Agreement continues in force or until such time as no part of Diego Garcia is any longer required for the purposes of the facility, whichever occurs first".

=== Supplementary arrangements and related notes ===
On the same day the Royal Navy and the US Navy signed the Supplementary Arrangements 1976 for the Diego Garcia facility, under paragraph (19). They provided that the US Navy would set the facility's manning level, with both sides deciding jointly which posts British personnel would fill, that "All personnel assigned to Diego Garcia will serve an unaccompanied tour of duty", and that the British Officer-in-Charge would report to the American Commanding Officer in matters relating to the operation of the facility. In an exchange of letters, Spiers set out additional construction planned by the United States "subject to the availability of funds", including expanded dredging for a fleet anchorage, a fuel and general purpose pier, a runway extension, a hangar, quarters and an ammunition magazine; he added that any further construction would be subject to paragraph 2(b) of the 1966 agreement, and Hattersley confirmed that this accorded with the British government's understanding. The two governments recorded that they did not regard the Supplementary Arrangements and the letters as "international agreements, nor part of the Agreement of 25 February 1976"; they were published in the UN Treaty Series for information at the American government's request. In Britain they were placed in the House of Commons Library.

== Later developments ==
=== Removal of the Seychelles islands ===
By notes of 22 June 1976 the two governments deleted Aldabra, Farquhar and Desroches from the 1966 agreement with effect from 28 June 1976, when those islands were returned to Seychelles on its independence.

=== Further arrangements and expansion ===
In July 1980 the Foreign Office prepared notes for a ministerial answer on a resolution of the Organisation of African Unity calling for Diego Garcia to be returned to Mauritius. The notes said that Britain had recently been consulted on minor improvements to the facility and on further measures, and that "The published 1976 Anglo-US Agreement establishes certain requirements for consultation about use of the facility at Diego Garcia. These requirements have not changed." If pressed, the minister was to say: "We are satisfied that the two sides have a clear understanding about the circumstances in which joint decision is required."

A supplemental arrangement signed in Washington on 13 December 1982, made "pursuant to paragraph 19" of the 1976 agreement, added provisions on the island's limited resources and drinking water, on consultation if the United States intended to bring in large numbers of third-country workers, and on dumping, dredging and reef blasting. In October 1983 the government told the House of Lords that it had agreed to an American request to improve the facilities as funds became available, including better refuelling arrangements, expanded storage and wharf installations, and a new taxiway and parking apron. In 2026 a British minister listed the 1976 agreement among the periodic updates of the governance arrangements for the base, which "were updated in 1972, 1976, 1987 and 1999, and were rolled over in 2016".

=== Use of the facility ===
In October 1983 Lord Kennet asked about the consultation arrangements, noting that at the time of the American attempt to rescue the hostages in Tehran in 1980 "it was believed that there had been no prior consultation or warning". The minister, Baroness Young, replied that the terms governing consultation on the use of Diego Garcia "are set down in Article 3 of the 1976 Exchange of Notes", quoted it, and said she could add nothing on the rescue attempt to what the Prime Minister had said at the time. The British government has said that the base was used for operations in Iraq and Afghanistan, and in 2006 the US Solicitor General described it as providing "critical support services" to American and British forces in the Middle East, "including in Iraq and Afghanistan".

In February 2008 the Foreign Secretary, David Miliband, told the Commons: "Contrary to earlier explicit assurances that Diego Garcia had not been used for rendition flights, recent US investigations have now revealed two occasions, both in 2002, when that had in fact occurred." In each case an American aircraft carrying a single detainee had refuelled there. Answering questions, he said that "The letters of 1966 and 1976 have the force of treaty, and they are legally binding agreements."

In February 2026 British media reported, citing government sources, that the Prime Minister, Keir Starmer, had refused an American request to use Diego Garcia and RAF Fairford for any pre-emptive strike on Iran; according to The Times, the government was concerned that this "would be a breach of international law". CNN noted that American requests to use British bases had historically been considered "on a case-by-case basis, with precise criteria withheld for security reasons under long-standing agreements". In April 2026 the defence minister Lord Coaker told the House of Lords that the base was governed by the exchange of notes and that "all combat operations from that base are subject to joint decision-making".

=== Extension and the 2025 treaty ===
On 16 November 2016 the British government announced that the agreements underpinning the facility would "continue as they stand until 30 December 2036". Under the treaty signed with Mauritius on 22 May 2025, the Agreement concerning the Chagos Archipelago including Diego Garcia, Mauritius authorises the United Kingdom to exercise the rights required for the operation of the base, and the United Kingdom may operate the base jointly with the United States. In April 2026 the government said that an update to the UK–US exchange of notes was "necessary to ratify the treaty", but had become "impossible to agree at political level".

== See also ==
- Diego Garcia
- Naval Support Facility Diego Garcia
- UK–US Exchange of Notes on the British Indian Ocean Territory
- Expulsion of the Chagossians
- Chagos Archipelago sovereignty dispute

== Sources ==
=== Treaty texts ===
- Exchange of notes constituting an agreement supplementing the above-mentioned agreement, concerning a United States naval support facility on Diego Garcia, British Indian Ocean Territory and replacing the supplementary agreement of 24 October 1972. London, 25 February 1976 (PDF). United Nations Treaty Series. Vol. 1018. United Nations. 1976. pp. 372–381.
- Exchange of notes constituting an agreement between the Government of the United Kingdom of Great Britain and Northern Ireland and the Government of the United States of America concerning the availability for defence purposes of the British Indian Ocean Territory. London, 30 December 1966 (No. 8737) (PDF). United Nations Treaty Series. Vol. 603. United Nations. 1967. pp. 273–290. Also published as UK Treaty Series No. 15 (1967), Cmnd 3231; 18 UST 28; TIAS 6196.
- Exchange of notes constituting an agreement supplementing the above-mentioned agreement concerning a limited United States naval communications facility on Diego Garcia, British Indian Ocean Territory. London, 24 October 1972 (PDF). United Nations Treaty Series. Vol. 866. United Nations. 1973. pp. 302–307.
- Exchange of notes constituting an agreement amending the above-mentioned agreement, as supplemented. London, 22 June 1976 (PDF). United Nations Treaty Series. Vol. 1032. United Nations. 1977. pp. 323–324.
- Supplemental arrangement to the above-mentioned agreement relating to the Agreement of 25 February 1976 on the Diego Garcia facility. Signed at Washington on 13 December 1982 (PDF). United Nations Treaty Series. Vol. 2001. United Nations. 1998. pp. 397–400.

=== Court decisions and pleadings ===
- Chagos Islanders v Attorney General and HM BIOT Commissioner, EWHC (QB) 2222 (High Court 9 October 2003).
- R (Bancoult) v Secretary of State for Foreign and Commonwealth Affairs, EWHC (Admin) 1502 (High Court (Divisional Court) 11 June 2013).
- Clement, Paul D.; et al. (December 2006). "Brief for the Respondents in Opposition, Bancoult v. McNamara, No. 06-502". Office of the Solicitor General, United States Department of Justice.

=== Archival documents ===
- Bergold, Harry E. Jr. (1974). "65. Memorandum From the Deputy Assistant Secretary of Defense for European and NATO Affairs (Bergold) to the Deputy Assistant Secretary of Defense for Security Assistance (Peet), 17 January 1974". Foreign Relations of the United States, 1969–1976, Volume E-8, Documents on South Asia, 1973–1976. Office of the Historian, United States Department of State.
- Kissinger, Henry A. (1974). "69. Memorandum From Secretary of State Kissinger to President Nixon, 25 February 1974". Foreign Relations of the United States, 1969–1976, Volume E-8, Documents on South Asia, 1973–1976. Office of the Historian, United States Department of State.
- "78. Memorandum of Conversation, Washington, 13 August 1974". Foreign Relations of the United States, 1969–1976, Volume E-8, Documents on South Asia, 1973–1976. Office of the Historian, United States Department of State. 1974.
- "89. Memorandum of Conversation, Washington, 16 July 1975". Foreign Relations of the United States, 1969–1976, Volume E-8, Documents on South Asia, 1973–1976. Office of the Historian, United States Department of State. 1975.
- Department of State (1975). "90. Telegram 264692 From the Department of State, 7 November 1975". Foreign Relations of the United States, 1969–1976, Volume E-8, Documents on South Asia, 1973–1976. Office of the Historian, United States Department of State.
- Foreign and Commonwealth Office (23 July 1980). House of Lords, Parliamentary Question for Oral Answer: Notes for Supplementaries (PDF). TNA FCO 31/2759 – via Written Statement of the Republic of Mauritius (ICJ), vol. IV, Annex 121.

=== Parliamentary and government sources ===
- "Diego Garcia". Hansard, House of Commons (Written Answers). 5 February 1974. HC Deb 5 February 1974 vol 868 cc276–277W.
- "Diego Garcia". Hansard, House of Commons. 20 March 1974. HC Deb 20 March 1974 vol 870 cc1267–1277.
- "Diego Garcia". Hansard, House of Commons. 9 April 1974. HC Deb 9 April 1974 vol 872 cc138–139.
- "Defence Review". Hansard, House of Commons. 3 December 1974. HC Deb 3 December 1974 vol 882 cc1351–1369.
- "Diego Garcia". Hansard, House of Commons. 11 March 1975. HC Deb 11 March 1975 vol 888 cc258–259.
- "Diego Garcia". Hansard, House of Commons. 22 July 1975. HC Deb 22 July 1975 vol 896 cc272–274.
- "Diego Garcia". Hansard, House of Commons. 13 August 1975.
- "Diego Garcia Inhabitants". Hansard, House of Lords. 14 October 1975. HL Deb 14 October 1975 vol 364 cc772–777.
- "Diego Garcia Inhabitants". Hansard, House of Lords. 20 October 1975. HL Deb 20 October 1975 vol 364 cc1143–1145.
- "Diego Garcia". Hansard, House of Lords. 27 October 1975. HL Deb 27 October 1975 vol 365 cc4–8.
- "Diego Garcia". Hansard, House of Commons (Written Answers). 26 February 1976. HC Deb 26 February 1976 vol 906 cc284–285W.
- "Diego Garcia: Consultation with United States". Hansard, House of Lords. 25 October 1983. HL Deb 25 October 1983 vol 444 cc129–130.
- "Terrorist Suspects (Renditions)". Hansard, House of Commons. 21 February 2008.
- Duncan, Alan (16 November 2016). "Update on the British Indian Ocean Territory (HCWS260)". UK Parliament: Written questions, answers and statements.
- House of Lords International Agreements Committee (25 June 2025). UK-Mauritius Agreement on the Chagos Archipelago including Diego Garcia (PDF) (Report). 9th Report of Session 2024–26, HL Paper 146. House of Lords.
- Loft, Philip; Curtis, John (8 September 2025). 2025 treaty on the British Indian Ocean Territory/Chagos Archipelago (Report). Research Briefing CBP-10273. House of Commons Library.
- "Diego Garcia Military Base and British Indian Ocean Territory Bill". Hansard, House of Commons. 13 April 2026.
- "Diego Garcia Military Base and British Indian Ocean Territory Bill". Hansard, House of Lords. 14 April 2026.

=== Books and news ===
- Hendry, Ian; Dickson, Susan (2011). British Overseas Territories Law (PDF). Oxford: Hart Publishing – via Written Statement of the Republic of Mauritius (ICJ), vol. V, Annex 157.
- Vine, David (2009). Island of Shame: The Secret History of the U.S. Military Base on Diego Garcia (PDF). Princeton University Press. ISBN 978-0-691-13869-5 – via Written Statement of the Republic of Mauritius (ICJ), vol. V, Annex 151 (extracts).
- Lendon, Brad (20 February 2026). "Diego Garcia: Britain blocking use of air bases Trump says would be needed for strikes on Iran, UK media report". CNN.
