= Maldives–Mauritius relations =

Bilateral relations between the Maldives and Mauritius

- Maldives: Mauritius

Maldives–Mauritius relations are the bilateral relations between the Maldives and Mauritius, two island states in the Indian Ocean. The two countries established diplomatic relations on 15 January 1981. Since 2010 their relations have been shaped mainly by the Chagos Archipelago, which lies between them. Mauritius claims the archipelago, which is administered by the United Kingdom as the British Indian Ocean Territory, and the Maldives' claimed maritime zones overlap with those of the archipelago. A maritime boundary case brought by Mauritius was decided by a special chamber of the International Tribunal for the Law of the Sea in 2023. In 2026 the Maldivian government withdrew its earlier recognition of Mauritian sovereignty over the archipelago and objected to the 2025 UK–Mauritius agreement. Mauritius suspended diplomatic relations on 27 February 2026.

== Maritime claims and the Chagos Archipelago ==
=== Early contacts, 2001–2011 ===
In June 2001, Mauritius proposed negotiations on the delimitation of the continental shelf around the Chagos Archipelago. The Maldives declined, replying that "as jurisdiction over the Chagos Archipelago is not exercised by the Government of Mauritius", discussions would be "inappropriate". In February 2010 the Maldives proposed talks on the delimitation of the two countries' exclusive economic zones. On 26 July 2010 the Maldives made a submission to the Commission on the Limits of the Continental Shelf (CLCS). At a meeting in Malé on 21 October 2010, the Maldivian side acknowledged that the submission had not taken Mauritius' exclusive economic zone "in the Chagos region" into account and said this would be rectified.

During a state visit by the President of the Maldives to Mauritius from 11 to 13 March 2011, the two leaders "agreed to make bilateral arrangements on the overlapping area of extended continental shelf of the two States around the Chagos Archipelago". No amendment to the Maldivian submission was made. On 24 March 2011 Mauritius formally protested that the Maldives' claimed extended continental shelf "encroaches on the Exclusive Economic Zone" of Mauritius. The special chamber later found that, "for most of the time", the Maldives had refused to negotiate with Mauritius.

=== United Nations votes, 2017–2019 ===
The Maldives voted against resolution 71/292 of 2017, which requested an advisory opinion from the International Court of Justice on the separation of the archipelago from Mauritius. It also voted against resolution 73/295 of 2019, which followed the opinion. It said the resolution "prejudges the implications" of its 2010 CLCS submission, while stating that its vote should not be construed as a position "against the sponsors of the draft resolution". In a right of reply, Mauritius said that the Maldivian claim "clearly overlapped with our potential exclusive economic zone" and that the Maldives had not responded to its invitation to a second round of talks.

=== ITLOS proceedings, 2019–2023 ===
Mauritius instituted proceedings on 18 June 2019. The two states agreed on 24 September 2019 to transfer them to a special chamber of ITLOS. On 28 January 2021 the special chamber rejected the Maldives' preliminary objections. It held that Mauritius "can be regarded as the coastal State in respect of the Chagos Archipelago" for the purpose of the delimitation.

During the merits phase, Mauritius surveyed Blenheim Reef in February 2022. The two governments disagreed over the conditions for its survey vessel to use the Maldivian port of Gan. In a letter of 22 August 2022 to the Prime Minister of Mauritius, President Ibrahim Mohamed Solih of the Maldives gave an assurance that the Maldives would vote "yes" on a future General Assembly resolution giving effect to the advisory opinion. He also undertook to facilitate the travel of the Mauritian Prime Minister to the archipelago through the Maldives, and Mauritius dropped its claim for the survey costs.

The special chamber delivered its judgment on 28 April 2023. It unanimously drew a single maritime boundary within 200 nautical miles, allocating 47,232 km² of the overlapping area to the Maldives and 45,331 km² to Mauritius, and declined to delimit the continental shelf beyond 200 nautical miles. The Maldivian government under Solih described the outcome as favourable to the Maldives.

== Breakdown of relations, 2023–2026 ==
The People's National Congress, then in opposition, criticised the ruling, and recovering the area was a pledge in the 2023 presidential campaign of Mohamed Muizzu. On 19 November 2023, Muizzu ordered the Attorney General's Office to review the matter.

In his presidential address at the opening of the People's Majlis on 5 February 2026, Muizzu announced that the government was rescinding Solih's letter of 22 August 2022. He said that "legal steps have now been initiated to recover the vacated portion of the exclusive economic zone", and that the Maldives' exclusive economic zone "remains as currently defined by law". He disclosed that the government had written to the United Kingdom on 8 November 2024 and 18 January 2026 objecting to the transfer of the archipelago to Mauritius. He also said the government had told Mauritius and the IUCN that it opposed Mauritian economic measures in the Chagos region that could affect Maldivian fisheries and tourism. He announced a commission of inquiry into the previous government's decisions. Muizzu also said that the Maldives had a stronger historical and legal claim to the archipelago than Mauritius.

On 27 February 2026 the Cabinet of Mauritius decided to suspend diplomatic relations with the Maldives with immediate effect. The Mauritian foreign ministry said that the Maldives "no longer recognizes the sovereignty of the Republic of Mauritius over the Chagos Archipelago" and "is now objecting to the Agreement between Mauritius and the United Kingdom". It said the decision reflected the commitment of Mauritius "to safeguard its national interest and uphold the principles of sovereignty". Muizzu called the decision "a very unreasonable, immature, and naive move". He said that the Maldives would not change its position and that "if Chagos is to be handed over to any nation, it must be returned to its rightful owner, the Maldives".

In May 2026, former Maldivian president Mohamed Nasheed said after meeting the Mauritian foreign minister in New Delhi that Mauritius was "ready to engage" in talks, and urged the Maldivian foreign ministry to take up the opportunity. As of May 2026 relations remained suspended.

== See also ==
- Foreign relations of the Maldives
- Foreign relations of Mauritius
- Chagos Archipelago sovereignty dispute

== Sources ==
Court decisions and UN records

- Dispute concerning delimitation of the maritime boundary between Mauritius and Maldives in the Indian Ocean (Mauritius/Maldives), Preliminary Objections, Judgment (PDF). ITLOS Reports 2020–2021. International Tribunal for the Law of the Sea. 28 January 2021. p. 17.
- Dispute concerning delimitation of the maritime boundary between Mauritius and Maldives in the Indian Ocean (Mauritius/Maldives), Judgment (PDF). International Tribunal for the Law of the Sea. 28 April 2023.
- United Nations General Assembly (22 June 2017). Official Records, Seventy-first session, 88th plenary meeting, Thursday, 22 June 2017 (A/71/PV.88) (Report). United Nations.
- United Nations General Assembly (22 May 2019). Official Records, Seventy-third session, 83rd plenary meeting, Wednesday, 22 May 2019, 10 a.m. (A/73/PV.83) (Report). United Nations.
- United Nations General Assembly (22 May 2019). Official Records, Seventy-third session, 84th plenary meeting, Wednesday, 22 May 2019, 3 p.m. (A/73/PV.84) (Report). United Nations.

Government statements and news reports

- Kunda, James (28 February 2026). "Mauritius suspends diplomatic ties with Maldives". Anadolu Agency.
- "Maldives rejects ITLOS ruling, withdraws letter sent to Mauritius". Atoll Times. 5 February 2026.
- "Mauritius suspends diplomatic relations with Maldives over Chagos stance". Atoll Times. 27 February 2026.
- "Nasheed says Mauritius open to talks with Maldives". Atoll Times. 9 May 2026.
- Shiuza, Fathimath (2 March 2026). "President Dr. Muizzu calls Mauritius' move unreasonable, reaffirms Maldives' claim to Chagos". Maldives Voice.
- "President convenes Special meeting with the Cabinet on the ITLOS decision on the Chagos Archipelago case" (Press release). The President's Office, Maldives. 28 April 2023.
- "Presidential Address 2026: President affirms that not an iota of Maldivian territory will be surrendered" (Press release). The President's Office, Maldives. 5 February 2026.
- Mohamed, Mariyath (27 February 2026). "Mauritius suspends diplomatic ties with Maldives over Chagos". The Edition.
