= Blenheim (1834 ship) =

History

United Kingdom
- Name: Blenheim
- Builder: Jarrow, England
- Launched: 1834
- Fate: Lost 1846

General characteristics
- Tons burthen: 375 (bm)
- Propulsion: Sail

Blenheim was built in 1834 at Jarrow, England. She made three voyages transporting convicts to Australia. She also carried emigrants to New Zealand. She otherwise carried ordinary valuable cargo and in one of such voyages came across what has since been named Blenheim Reef, in the Indian Ocean. She disappeared without a trace, presumed foundered, after August 1846.

== Convict ship ==
Blenheim first appeared in the 1835 volume of Lloyd's Register (LR).

Year	Master	Owner	Trade	Source
1835	Brown	Brown & Co.	London	LR

First convict voyage (1834): Under the command of Jasper Brown, Blenheim sailed from Cork, Ireland on 27 July 1834 and arrived at Port Jackson on 14 November 1834. She had embarked 200 male convicts, of whom two died on the voyage. Blenheim left Port Jackson in December 1834 bound for Batavia. Bound commercially for Bombay, she came across a reef, henceforth Blenheim Reef, an outlying part of the Chagos Archipelago, on 5 May 1836.

Second convict voyage (1837): Sailing from Woolwich on 15 March 1837, under the command of Josiah Spence, she arrived at Hobart Town on 16 July 1837. She had embarked 210 male convicts; six convicts died on the voyage. She departed Hobart Town and sailed to Port Jackson, before heading to Mauritius on 4 September. She obtained a cargo of sugar and returned to Port Jackson on 20 February 1838. She left for Sourabaya in April 1838.

Third convict voyage (1839): Under the command of John Gray, she left Dublin, Ireland on 19 May 1839, and arrived at Port Jackson on 27 September. She had embarked 200 male convicts; four convicts died on the voyage. Blenheim departed Port Jackson in October for India.

Year	Master	Owner	Trade	Source & notes
1839	Grey	Brown & Co.	London–Sydney	LR; damages repaired 1839
1841	Grey	Brown & Co.	London; London–India	LR; damages repaired 1839 & 1841

== New Zealand Company ==
Captain Gray sailed Blenheim under charter by the New Zealand Company, from London to Wellington in 1840 with 197 settlers.

Captain Gray sailed from Plymouth on 2 July 1842 to New Plymouth with 159 settlers, arriving on 19 November 1842, having called in at Wellington.

== Final voyages ==
From 1841 to 1843 Blenheim travelled from England to India under Captain Gray. Ownership changed in 1844 from Brown and Co. to H. Barrick of Whitby. From 1844 to 1845 sailed from London to St Petersburg.

Year	Master	Owner	Trade	Source & notes
1846	J.Grey; Jackson	H.Barrick	London; London–Petersburg; London–Quebec	LR; damages repaired 1839 & 1841

== Fate ==
Blenheim was last reported as having cleared outward bound from London, in ballast, on 25 August 1846. bound or Dalhousie. The 1846 volume of Lloyd's Register carried the annotation "missing" by Blenheim's name.
