= Chagos Archipelago =

Archipelago in the Indian Ocean

Disputed islands
- The atolls and banks of the Chagos Archipelago

- Chagos Archipelago (Indian Ocean) Location of the Chagos Archipelago in the Indian Ocean

Geography
- Location: Indian Ocean
- Coordinates: 6°00′S 71°30′E
- Total islands: 55–59 (Note: The number of islands is given as about 55, 58 or 59, and varies with the height of the tide and the movement of sand banks.)
- Major islands: Diego Garcia, Peros Banhos, Salomon Islands, Great Chagos Bank, Egmont Islands
- Area: 53 km^{2} (20 sq mi) (Note: Sources give different figures. A dataset of Sheppard and Topp gives 4,807 ha (48.07 km^{2}) for 59 islands, of which the Diego Garcia islands make up 2,734 ha; the 2012 conservation management plan gives Diego Garcia as 2,719.5 ha and "over half of the total land area"; Sheppard and colleagues (2012) give Diego Garcia as 29.7 km^{2}, half the land area; Stoddart (1971) gives about 30 km^{2} of land on Diego Garcia; the United Kingdom's Counter-Memorial of 2013 gives about 30 km^{2} for Diego Garcia and about 60 km^{2} in all; Mauritius's Memorial of 2012 gives 27.20 km^{2} for Diego Garcia; and the BIOT Administration gives around 50 km^{2} in all, of which Diego Garcia makes up 44 km^{2}.)

Administration
- United Kingdom
- Overseas territory: British Indian Ocean Territory

Claimed by
- Mauritius (Note: Mauritius regards the archipelago as part of its territory. Under a treaty signed on 22 May 2025 the United Kingdom agreed to recognise Mauritian sovereignty over the archipelago, but the treaty had not entered into force by November 2026.)

Demographics
- Demonym: Chagossian (the islanders and their descendants)
- Population: c. 2,000 on Diego Garcia, mostly military personnel and contractors 6 Chagossians on Île du Coin (September 2026)

The Chagos Archipelago (/ˈtʃɑːɡəs, -ɡoʊs/, also UK: /ˈtʃeɪɡɒs/) or Chagos Islands is a group of coral atolls, reefs and submerged banks in the central Indian Ocean, at the southern end of the Chagos–Laccadive Ridge. It lies 1,188 nautical miles (2,200 km) north-east of the island of Mauritius and, at its closest point, 269 nautical miles (500 km) south of the Maldives. Five atolls carry islands: Diego Garcia, Peros Banhos, the Salomon Islands, the Egmont Islands and the Great Chagos Bank, described as the world's largest atoll by area; the others are reefs and banks, most of them submerged. The 55 to 59 islands are small and low, with a total land area of about 53 km^{2} (20 sq mi), more than half of it on Diego Garcia, while the archipelago's 200-nautical-mile zone covers some 640,000 km^{2} (247,000 sq mi).

The archipelago has more than 60,000 square kilometres (23,000 sq mi) of shallow reef and limestone platform, and in 2012 Sheppard and colleagues estimated that it held between a quarter and a half of the Indian Ocean's reef area remaining in excellent condition. Largely free of local pollution, fishing and coastal development, its reefs serve as a scientific reference site, although marine heatwaves in 1998 and 2015–2016 killed much of their coral. Eighteen species of seabird breed in the islands, and green and hawksbill turtles nest on their beaches. Diego Garcia was designated a Ramsar site in 2001, and in 2010 the United Kingdom declared the waters around the archipelago, except Diego Garcia, a marine protected area.

Portuguese navigators charted the islands in the 16th century. From the 1780s they were settled from Mauritius, then the French colony of Île de France, where planters were granted concessions for coconut plantations worked by enslaved people brought mainly from Madagascar and Mozambique. After the Treaty of Paris the United Kingdom administered the archipelago as a dependency of the colony of Mauritius until 1965, when it detached the islands to form the British Indian Ocean Territory. Between 1967 and 1973 the whole population, the Chagossians, was either prevented from returning or removed, most of them to Mauritius, and a joint British–American military base was built on Diego Garcia. The islands have no permanent inhabitants; around 2,000 people, mostly military personnel and contractors, are ordinarily present on Diego Garcia, and since February 2026 a small group of Chagossians has lived without permits on Île du Coin.

Mauritius claims the archipelago, which it says the United Kingdom detached unlawfully before Mauritian independence. In 2019 the International Court of Justice advised that the decolonisation of Mauritius had not been lawfully completed and that the United Kingdom should end its administration of the archipelago "as rapidly as possible", and the United Nations General Assembly demanded its withdrawal in resolution 73/295. On 22 May 2025 the two governments signed a treaty under which the United Kingdom would recognise Mauritian sovereignty over the whole archipelago and keep the base on Diego Garcia for an initial 99 years; as of November 2026 it had not entered into force.

== Names ==
The Portuguese knew the archipelago as Chagas, a word that, according to the historian Auguste Toussaint, referred to the wounds of Christ; the islands appear on Portuguese charts from 1538. A chart published in London in 1778 called them the Bassas de Chagas. In the Maldivian language the islands were called Folovahi, which according to the former British Indian Ocean Territory Commissioner Richard Edis means something like "ten islands". (Note: A Maldivian civic group campaigning in 2026 for a Maldivian claim to the archipelago used the form "Folhlhavai".)

Plan des isles de Peros Banhos, a French chart by Lazare Picault, 1744. Peros Banhos and the Three Brothers kept their Portuguese names.

Early maps gave Diego Garcia other names, including Gratia, Graciosa and Don Garzia, and the present name became fixed only towards the end of the 18th century; Peros Banhos and the Three Brothers (Portuguese Tres Irmãos) kept their Portuguese names. The Salomon Islands are named after the French ship Salomon, which visited them in 1777, the Egmont Islands and Eagle Island after British ships that called in 1760 and 1772, and Speakers Bank and Pitt Bank after the ships Speaker and Pitt, which surveyed them in 1763. Boddam Island, in the Salomon group, is named after Rawson Hart Boddam, the Governor of Bombay. In the 19th century the Egmont atoll was known as the "Six Islands".

During the 19th and the first half of the 20th centuries the archipelago and the Mauritian island of Agaléga were known together as the "Oil Islands", from the coconut oil that they produced. In English the group is also called the Chagos Islands. Since 8 November 1965 it has formed the British Indian Ocean Territory, while the Constitution of Mauritius lists "the Chagos Archipelago, including Diego Garcia" among the islands of Mauritius.

== Geography ==
The Chagos Archipelago seen by NASA's MODIS satellite instrument, May 2015. Diego Garcia is the oval atoll in the lower left.

The Chagos Archipelago lies in the central Indian Ocean at the southern end of the Chagos–Laccadive Ridge, which continues northwards through the Maldives and Lakshadweep. A central area of about 200 by 300 km (120 by 190 mi) contains five atolls with islands, one atoll that is awash at high tide and about a dozen atolls submerged to depths of 6–25 m. The archipelago lies 1,188 nautical miles (2,200 km) north-east of the island of Mauritius and, at its closest point, 269 nautical miles (500 km) south of the Maldives.

Peros Banhos (Landsat 7, false colour, 2003)

The Salomon Islands (Space Shuttle, 1992)

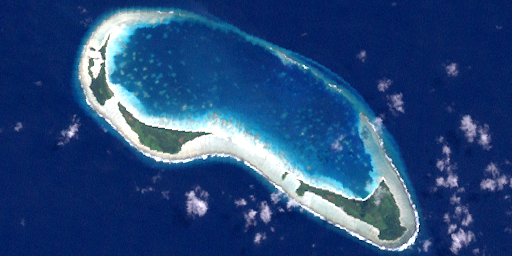
The Egmont Islands (Landsat)

Diego Garcia (Sentinel-2, 2021)

Four of the archipelago's atolls seen from space

The islands are small and low. Geographic information system estimates by Dumbraveanu and Sheppard give a total land area of 52.98 km^{2} (20.46 sq mi), of which Diego Garcia accounts for 29.17 km^{2} (11.26 sq mi), more than half; reef flats exposed at low tide add a further 84.86 km^{2} (32.76 sq mi). The number of islands is given as about 55, 58 or 59; Sheppard and colleagues note that it varies with the height of the tide and the movement of sand banks. The 200-nautical-mile zone around the archipelago covers some 640,000 km^{2} (247,000 sq mi), according to the BIOT Administration. (Note: The 2012 conservation management plan gives a recalculated area of 639,661 km^{2} for the marine protected area, which covers the same zone apart from Diego Garcia, and notes that earlier estimates were about 550,000 km^{2}; the arbitral tribunal in Mauritius v United Kingdom described the protected area as covering "more than half a million square kilometres".)

Atolls, reefs and banks of the Chagos Archipelago, from north to south
| Feature | Type | Islands (Note: Number of islands listed in the dataset of Sheppard and Topp. Other sources give different counts for some atolls: the United Kingdom's Counter-Memorial gives Peros Banhos "over twenty-five" islands, the Salomon Islands eleven and the Egmont group four; the United States sailing directions describe the Egmont group as six islands and the Three Brothers as three; and Sheppard and colleagues give the Great Chagos Bank eight islands.) | Land area (km^{2}) (Note: Atoll totals from the estimates of Dumbraveanu and Sheppard; figures in italics for the individual islands of the Great Chagos Bank are from the dataset of Sheppard and Topp, converted from hectares.) | Area, dimensions and depths | Notes | Location |
|---|---|---|---|---|---|---|
| Colvocoresses Reef | Submerged reef | 0 | – | Least charted depth 9 m | Lies 8 nmi east of Speakers Bank; not closely examined | 4°54′S 72°37′E |
| Speakers Bank | Submerged bank | 0 | – | Extends 24 nmi south-south-west from its northern end; 5.5–14.5 m deep at the edge and 42 m near the centre | The northernmost bank of the archipelago | 4°55′S 72°20′E |
| Blenheim Reef | Atoll reef awash at low water | 0 | – | About 6 by 2 nmi; covered at high water except at its southern end; lagoon encumbered with rock | Had three low sandy islands according to a report of 1787; now emergent only in parts at low tide | 5°12′S 72°28′E |
| Peros Banhos | Atoll | 31 | 10.41 | Lagoon up to 75 m deep, median depth 40 m; reef flats awash at low water 35.21 km^{2} | Islets all low, the highest 3.7 m; wide lagoon entrances; Benares Shoals (least depth 4.6 m) lie 5.5 nmi to the west | 5°20′S 71°51′E |
| Salomon Islands | Atoll | 10 | 3.23 | About 4 by 3 nmi, 36 km^{2} overall; lagoon up to 31 m deep, median depth 21 m | Lagoon entered by a north-western passage with a least depth of 5.8 m | 5°22′S 72°13′E |
| Victory Bank | Submerged bank | 0 | – | 5.5 m deep around the edge of the reef and up to 33 m inside | About 18 nmi south-east of Peros Banhos; rises steeply from great depths | 5°32′S 72°14′E |
| Great Chagos Bank | Largely submerged atoll | 8 | 7.04 | About 13,500 km^{2}; about 60 nmi from north to south and 90 nmi from east to west; rim with a least depth of 5.5 m, depths inside up to 88 m | Islands on the northern and western rims only; the eastern and southern margins lie about 20 m below the surface | 6°13′S 72°05′E |
| Nelsons Island | Island on the northern rim of the Great Chagos Bank | 1 | 0.81 | – | A deep channel close to the east leads to an anchorage inside the rim | 5°41′S 72°19′E |
| Three Brothers | Islands on the western rim of the Great Chagos Bank | 4 | 0.375 | A bank with a least depth of 7.0 m extends 11 nmi east-south-east | Three islands, with a rocky islet between the middle and eastern islands; the fourth island in the dataset is Resurgent | 6°09′S 71°31′E |
| Eagle Islands | Islands on the western rim of the Great Chagos Bank | 2 | 2.52 | – | Eagle Island (2.34 km^{2}) and Sea Cow (0.18 km^{2}); the sailing directions describe a northern and a southern island 2 nmi apart, 10 nmi west-south-west of the Three Brothers | 6°12′S 71°19′E |
| Danger Island | Island at the western extremity of the Great Chagos Bank | 1 | 0.66 | A reef extends 3 nmi south-south-east | The sea breaks heavily round its coast | 6°23′S 71°16′E |
| Egmont Islands | Atoll | 5 | 3.13 | Elliptical atoll about 6 by 2 nmi; reef flats awash at low water 9.85 km^{2} | 16 nmi south-south-east of Danger Island; islands on the south-western rim, all but one reported in 1986 to be joined at low water by drying sand banks; lagoon entered through a shallow channel in the north | 6°40′S 71°21′E |
| Cauvin Bank | Submerged bank | 0 | – | – | One of the submerged banks south of the Great Chagos Bank | – |
| Pitt Bank | Submerged bank | 0 | – | Extends 35 nmi south-east; steep-to on all sides | Lies south-south-east to south-west of the Egmont Islands | 7°05′S 71°20′E |
| Diego Garcia | Atoll | 5 | 29.17 | About 13 by 6 nmi; 170 km^{2} in all, of which the lagoon covers 124 km^{2}; lagoon up to 31 m deep | Land rim round about 90 per cent of the atoll; three islets in the lagoon entrance | 7°17′S 72°24′E |
| Ganges Bank | Submerged bank | 0 | – | About 3.8 nmi long from south-east to north-west; least depth 12 m | Steep-to | 7°23′S 70°58′E |
| Wight Bank | Submerged bank | 0 | – | Least charted depth 8.5 m | Depths less than those charted may exist | 7°25′S 71°31′E |
| Centurion Bank | Submerged bank | 0 | – | Least charted depth 11 m | The south-westernmost feature of the archipelago; steep-to | 7°39′S 70°50′E |
| Total | | 59 | 52.98 | Reef flats awash at low water, all atolls: 84.86 km^{2} | | |

The Eagle Islands (left) and Danger Island (right) on the Great Chagos Bank, photographed from the International Space Station in January 2003

The Great Chagos Bank, a largely submerged atoll of about 13,500 km^{2} (5,200 sq mi) with a broad rim 7–17 m below the surface, is described by Sheppard and colleagues as the world's largest atoll by area, and by the United Kingdom as the world's largest drying coral atoll. Blenheim Reef, north of the Salomon Islands, consists of low-tide elevations, many of them more than 12 nautical miles from Île Takamaka in the Salomon Islands; in 2023 an international tribunal declined to use it for base points in delimiting the maritime boundary with the Maldives, though it gave the reef half effect.

=== Geology and climate ===
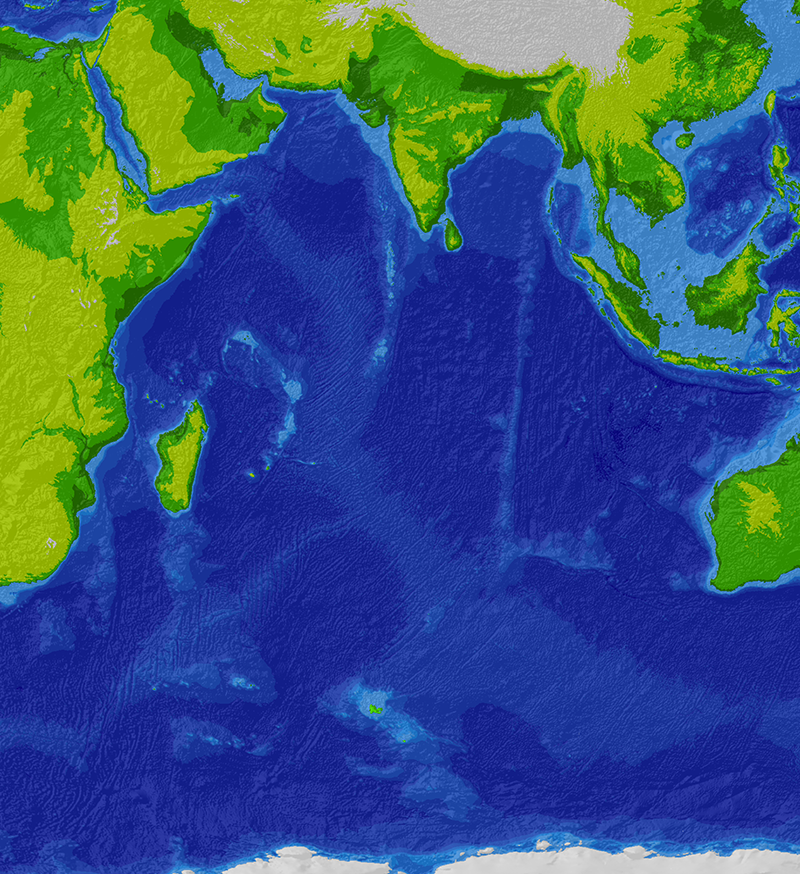
Relief of the Indian Ocean floor from satellite elevation data. The Chagos Archipelago lies on the Chagos–Laccadive Ridge, a volcanic ridge that continues northwards through the Maldives.

In a model proposed in 1981, the ridge is the track of a stationary hotspot now beneath Réunion (the Réunion hotspot), which earlier produced the Maldive and Laccadive islands, the Chagos Bank, the volcanic ridge beneath much of the Mascarene Plateau, and Mauritius, and whose first phase of activity probably coincided with the eruption of the Deccan Traps of western India. The geographer David Stoddart inferred that Diego Garcia is a typical mid-ocean atoll, with a reef limestone cap 1.5 km or more thick resting on a subsiding volcanic foundation. The banks fall steeply to oceanic depths of about 3,000 m, in places within 15 nautical miles of the coast, and the Chagos Trench, which runs north–south about 60 nautical miles east of the islands, descends to more than 5,000 m.

The mean temperature is about 27 °C throughout the year, and the relative humidity averages about 79 per cent. The Chagos are, according to Stoddart, the wettest coral islands in the Indian Ocean, with mean annual rainfall of more than 3,700 mm in places. Because of the low latitude, tropical cyclones are rare, although fresh westerly winds may blow when cyclones form or pass to the south; according to the Mauritius meteorological service, a cyclone of moderate strength passed just south of Diego Garcia on 16–17 September 1944 and destroyed two Catalina flying boats.

West Island, part of the Diego Garcia group, in 2005

The land on Diego Garcia is generally 1–1.5 m high, and the highest islet in Peros Banhos rises only 3.7 m. Sheppard and colleagues consider erosion of the shores and inundation by the sea, rather than sea-level rise as such, the immediate concern.

=== Maritime zones and resources ===
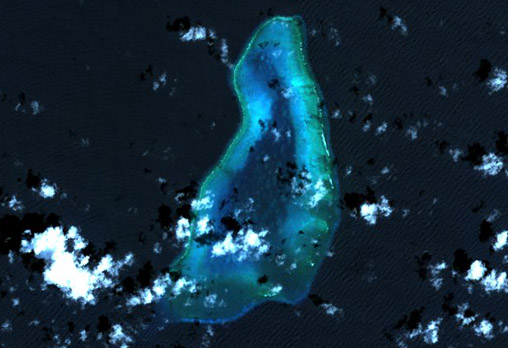
Blenheim Reef, a low-tide elevation north of the Salomon Islands, in a Landsat 7 image of 2003. In delimiting the maritime boundary between Mauritius and the Maldives in 2023, a special chamber of the International Tribunal for the Law of the Sea declined to give base points to the reef but gave it half effect as a relevant circumstance.

On 1 October 1991 the BIOT Commissioner proclaimed a 200-nautical-mile Fisheries Conservation and Management Zone, and on 17 September 2003 an Environment (Protection and Preservation) Zone with the same extent, whose coordinates were deposited with the Secretary-General of the United Nations in 2004. In 2023 a special chamber of the International Tribunal for the Law of the Sea, in a case between Mauritius and the Maldives to which the United Kingdom was not a party, drew a single maritime boundary between the archipelago and the Maldives within 200 nautical miles.

From the 18th century until the 1970s the only economic activity of significance was the coconut plantations, which produced coconut oil and copra. The last licences expired on 31 October 2010, after the creation of the protected area, and the resulting shortfall of about US$1 million a year in the territory's finances was made good from private sources. Under the understanding reached at the time of the detachment, the benefit of any minerals or oil found in or near the archipelago is to revert to Mauritius, and the United Kingdom has repeatedly said that it will not permit prospecting for minerals or oil while the territory remains British.

== Ecology and conservation ==
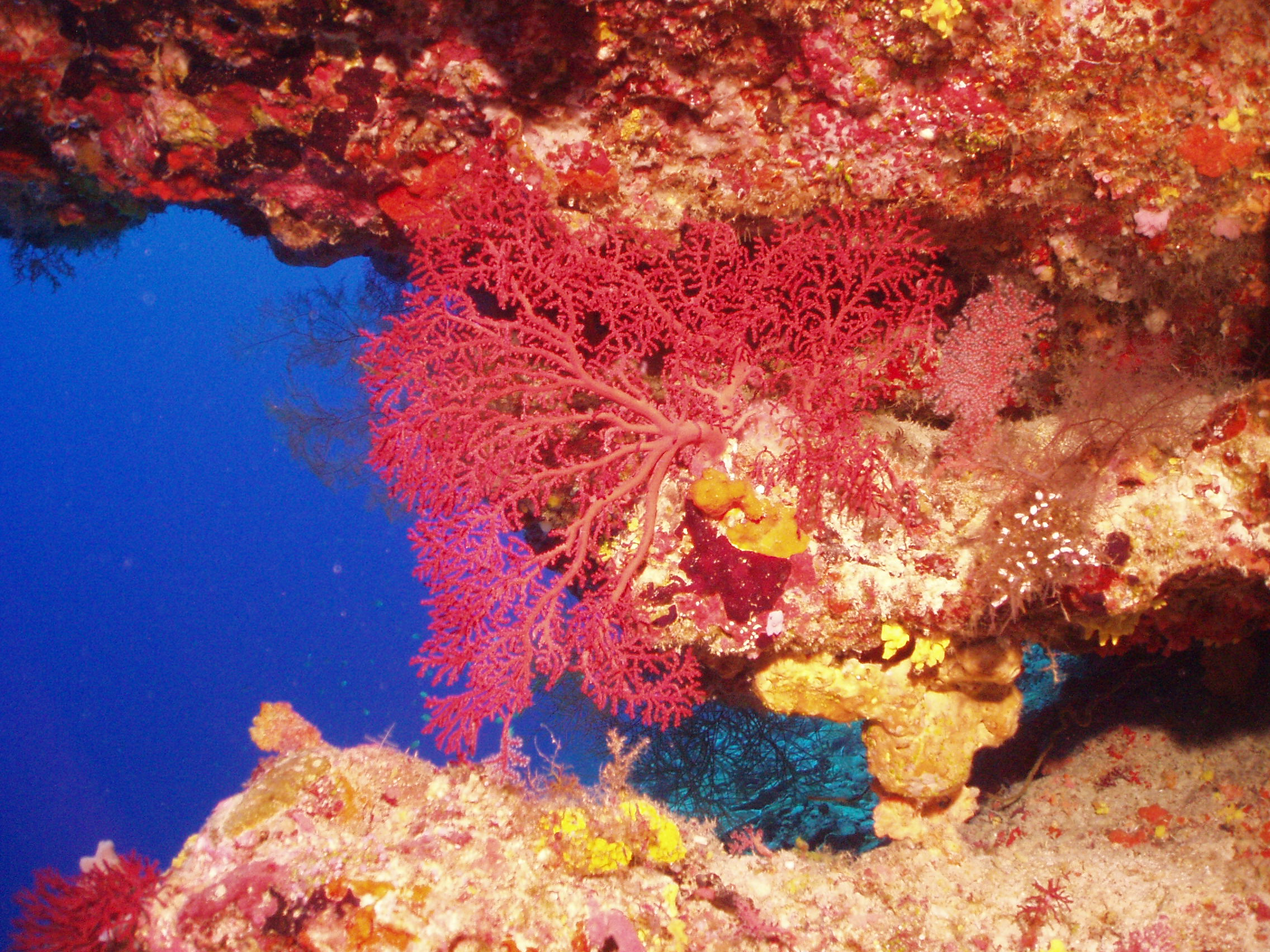
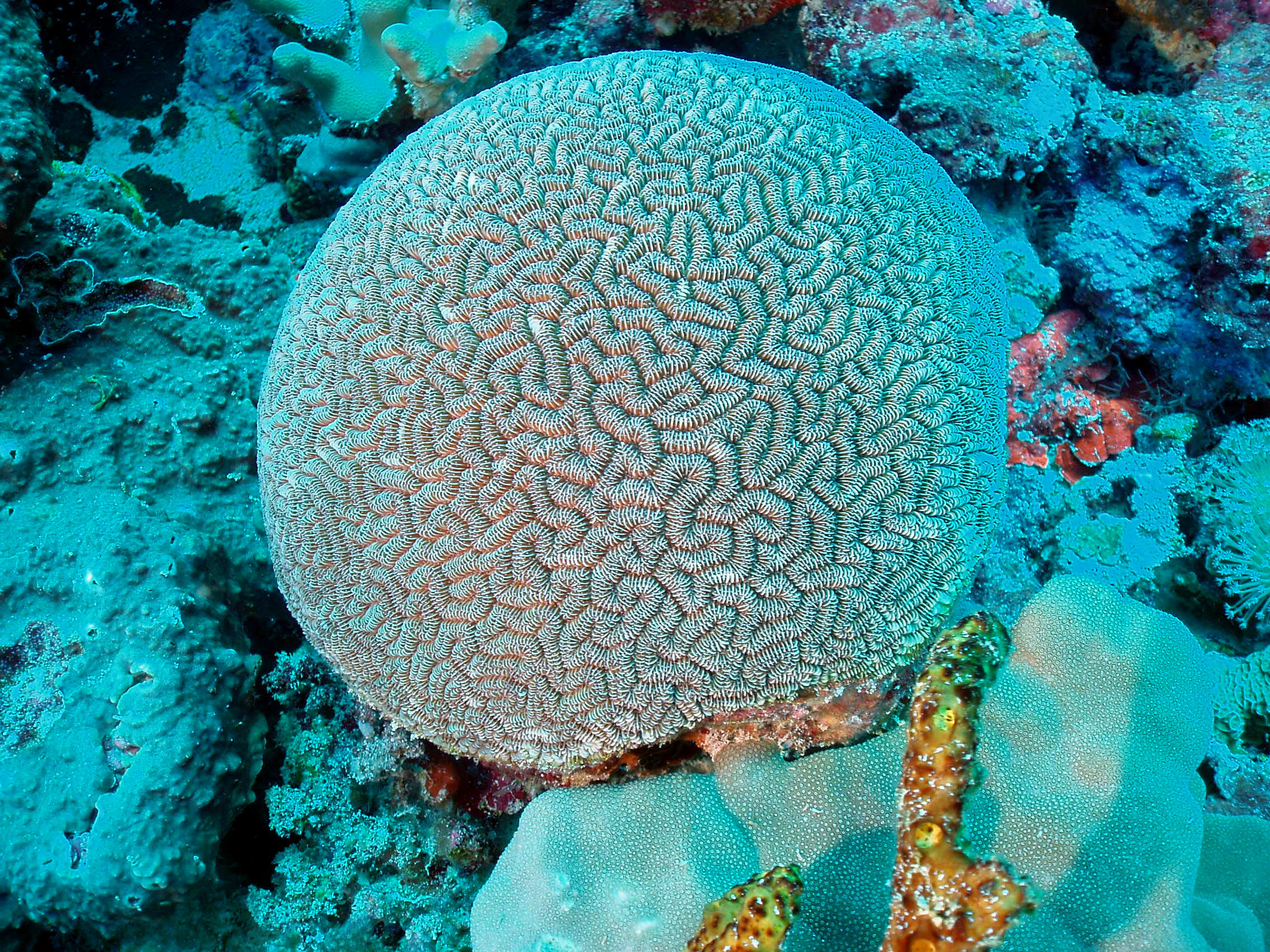
Coral on a reef in the Chagos Archipelago (left), and the brain coral Ctenella chagius (right)

According to the BIOT Administration, the territory has the greatest marine biodiversity in the United Kingdom and its overseas territories, with more than 220 species of coral, 855 of fish and 355 of molluscs. Sheppard and colleagues estimated in 2012 that it held between 25 and 50 per cent of the Indian Ocean's reef area remaining in excellent condition, as well as the world's largest contiguous area of undamaged reef. The reefs are valued as a scientific reference site because they are largely free of local pressures such as pollution, fishing and coastal development.

A marine heatwave in 1998 killed almost all corals on several ocean-facing reefs down to clearly defined depths, which exceeded 40 m at Diego Garcia but were only 10–15 m in the northern atolls; lagoon reefs were much less affected. Recovery in Chagos was faster than elsewhere in the central Indian Ocean: by 2001 juvenile corals reached densities of up to 28 per square metre, the highest then recorded anywhere, and shallow reefs regained their pre-1998 cover by 2010. Across twelve fore-reef sites, Lange and Perry found a 69 per cent decline in coral cover between 2015 and 2018 and a 77 per cent fall in coral carbonate production.

Volunteers measuring a hawksbill sea turtle before tagging it on Diego Garcia, December 2019

The Chagos Conservation Trust has recorded at least 784 species of inshore fish, including the endemic Chagos clownfish (Amphiprion chagosensis) and large wrasse and grouper that have been fished out of other reefs in the region. The number of reef sharks seen per scientific dive fell from an average of 4.2 in the 1970s to 0.4 in 2006, a decline of more than 90 per cent that Graham, Spalding and Sheppard attributed mainly to poaching. Using monitoring of an index beach on Diego Garcia and surveys of 90 per cent of the coastline, Mortimer and colleagues estimated that about 6,300 hawksbill and 20,500 green turtle clutches were laid each year in 2011–2018, an increase of two to five times for hawksbills and four to nine times for green turtles since 1996, which they attributed to more than 40 years without significant exploitation.

A great frigatebird (left, 2009) and a white tern (centre, 2008) on Diego Garcia, and a masked booby (right) in the British Indian Ocean Territory

Eighteen species of seabird breed in the archipelago. Black rats prey on eggs, chicks and adults: eight species now nest only on rat-free islands, and the eleven rat-free islands within designated or proposed Important Bird Areas held about 94 per cent of the archipelago's breeding seabirds. Graham and colleagues found in 2018 that seabird densities were 760 times and nitrogen deposition 251 times higher on rat-free islands, and that seabird-derived nitrogen reached algae, sponges and fish on the adjacent reefs, where fish biomass was 48 per cent greater and grazing and bioerosion 3.2 and 3.8 times faster.

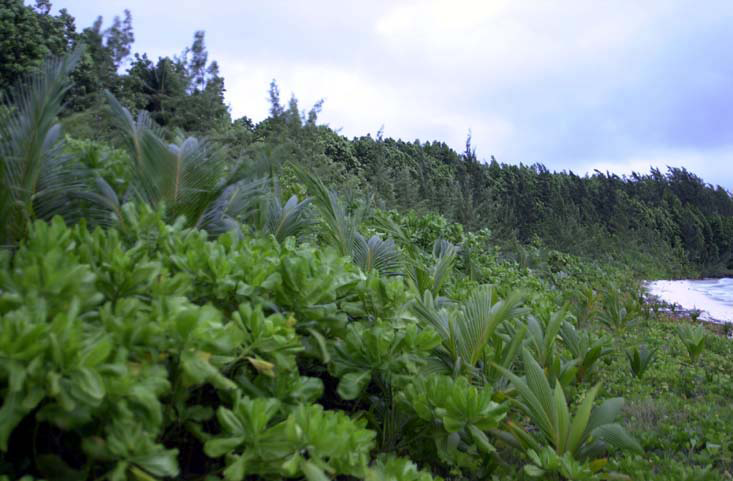
Ocean-side littoral scrub on Diego Garcia, 2005

Being young, remote and low-lying, the islands have a naturally poor flora of about 45 native species of higher plants, comprising 41 flowering plants (12 of them trees) and four ferns, none of them endemic. From the 18th century most of the native vegetation was replaced by coconut plantations; on Diego Garcia 6,250 of the atoll's 7,488 acres were under coconuts. There are no native land mammals, not even bats.

=== Conservation ===
Map of Peros Banhos showing the strict nature reserve

On land, the Diego Garcia Conservation (Restricted Area) Ordinance 1994 prohibits entry to the atoll's environmentally sensitive areas without a permit, and under the Strict Nature Reserve Regulations 1998 it is an offence to enter a strict nature reserve without written permission from the BIOT Administration. Diego Garcia was designated a Ramsar site on 4 July 2001. On 1 April 2010 the BIOT Commissioner proclaimed a marine protected area (MPA) over the territory's waters to 200 nautical miles, excluding Diego Garcia and the waters within 3 nautical miles of it. In 2015 an arbitral tribunal under the United Nations Convention on the Law of the Sea declared that in establishing the MPA the United Kingdom had breached Articles 2(3), 56(2) and 194(4) of the convention, but said that it had taken "no view on the substantive quality or nature of the MPA".

The scientist Nick Graham carrying out a fish count in the British Indian Ocean Territory

By 2012 there had been about a dozen scientific expeditions, involving more than 50 visiting scientists, and more than 200 papers drew on these and other work. Marine heatwaves caused mass coral mortality in 1998, 2015–2016 and 2024, and climate models predict more frequent and more severe heatwaves. Diego Garcia, the only inhabited atoll and site of the military base, lies outside the reserve. Sheppard and colleagues described it in 2012, on the basis of pollutant monitoring, as "the least polluted inhabited atoll in the world".

== History ==
Admiralty chart of the principal groups of the Chagos Archipelago, from the survey by Commander Robert Moresby in 1837, published in 1839

Portuguese navigators probably sighted and named the islands early in the 16th century, and in the account accepted by both parties in the 2015 arbitration the archipelago appeared on Portuguese charts as early as 1538 but "remained largely untouched". France took possession of Mauritius in 1715 as Île de France, and from the 1740s its ships explored the islands to the north. Concessions for coconut plantations granted by the French authorities on Île de France followed, "leading to permanent settlement". Accounts of the date differ: Mauritius and Vine date permanent settlement to a concession obtained in February 1783 by Pierre Marie Le Normand, a planter on Île de France, while the territory's British administration dates the first French copra plantations to 1793. The plantations were worked by enslaved people brought mainly from Madagascar and Mozambique, most of whom arrived through Mauritius.

By the Treaty of Paris of 30 May 1814 France ceded to Britain "the Isle of France and its Dependencies", and from then until 8 November 1965 the United Kingdom administered the archipelago as a dependency of the colony of Mauritius. Slavery was abolished in Mauritius and its dependencies under the Slavery Abolition Act 1833, followed by a period of apprenticeship; Edis dates final emancipation to 1840. The plantations, held by owners who lived in Mauritius, produced coconut oil and, from the early 20th century, copra, which was shipped to Mauritius. From 1882 to 1888 the atoll served as a coaling station for steamships on the route between the Red Sea and Australia. The two governments differ over what the relationship meant: Mauritius has argued that the archipelago "has always been an integral part of the territory of Mauritius", while the United Kingdom has said that it was administered from Mauritius "purely as a matter of convenience". In 2019 the International Court of Justice found that in 1965 the archipelago "was clearly an integral part of that non-self-governing territory".

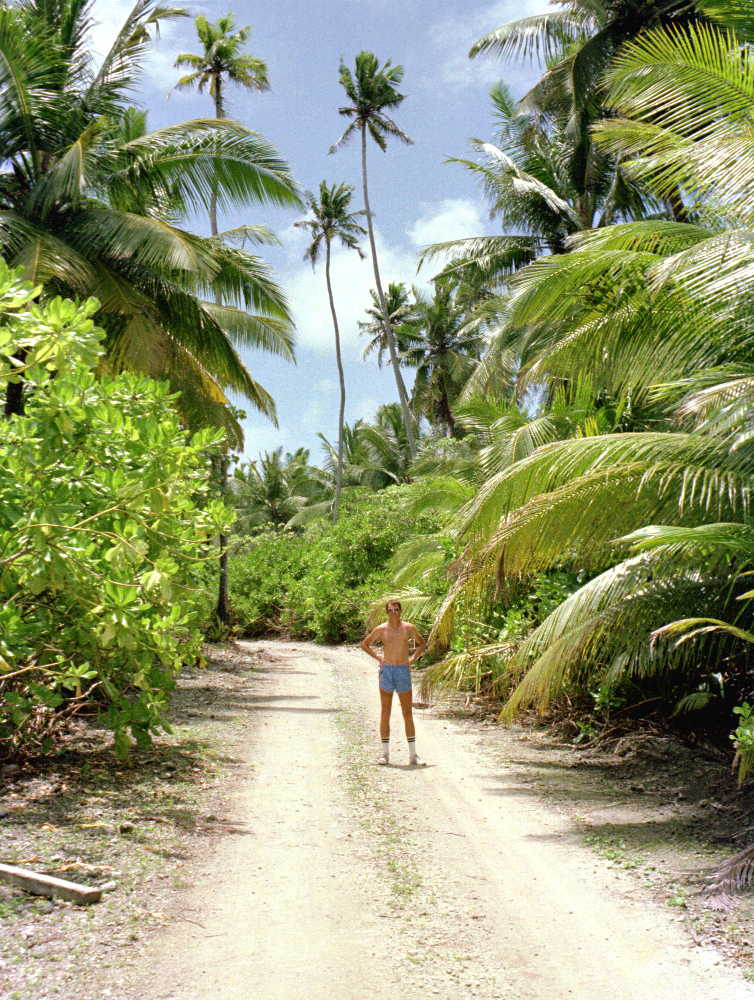
The road to the former plantation on the eastern side of Diego Garcia, 1982

At Lancaster House on 23 September 1965, during the conference on Mauritian independence, the Premier, Seewoosagur Ramgoolam, and two other ministers agreed in principle to detachment in return for compensation of £3 million and undertakings that included the islands' return to Mauritius when they were no longer needed for defence. On 8 November 1965 the British Indian Ocean Territory was created from the archipelago and three islands detached from Seychelles, which were returned to Seychelles in 1976. Under notes exchanged on 30 December 1966 the territory was made available for the defence needs of the United Kingdom and the United States, and a confidential Agreed Minute listed "resettling any inhabitants" among the administrative measures the United Kingdom was to take. Islanders who went to Mauritius in 1967 and 1968 were refused passage home; an ordinance of April 1971 made it unlawful to be in the territory without a permit, and between July and October 1971 the people of Diego Garcia were shipped to Peros Banhos and the Salomon Islands or to Seychelles and Mauritius. The International Court of Justice found that the whole population had been "either prevented from returning or forcibly removed and prevented from returning by the United Kingdom".

Under a 1982 agreement with Mauritius the United Kingdom paid a further £4 million ex gratia, without admitting liability. In a series of cases from 1998, the English courts quashed the islanders' exclusion in 2000, but in 2008 the House of Lords upheld orders in council of 2004 that again denied anyone the right of abode; in 2012 the European Court of Human Rights declared an application by Chagossians inadmissible. Mauritius, which has pressed its claim to the archipelago since 1980, challenged it in arbitration, and in 2019 the International Court of Justice, in an advisory opinion requested by the UN General Assembly, found that the decolonisation of Mauritius had not been lawfully completed. On 22 May 2025 the two governments signed a treaty under which the United Kingdom recognises Mauritian sovereignty over the whole archipelago, including Diego Garcia; it had not entered into force by November 2026 (see § Sovereignty dispute). On 16 February 2026 four Chagossians led by Misley Mandarin landed without permits on Île du Coin in Peros Banhos, intending to establish a permanent settlement in protest against the transfer.

== Political status ==
=== Administration ===
The United Kingdom administers the archipelago as the British Indian Ocean Territory (BIOT), one of its overseas territories. The territory's constitution is the British Indian Ocean Territory (Constitution) Order 2004, an Order in Council made under the royal prerogative, which provides for a Commissioner with power to make laws for the territory's "peace, order and good government". The Commissioner is appointed by the King on the advice of British ministers, and an Administrator runs the territory from day to day; the BIOT Administration, a team of about 40 people based in the United Kingdom, says that it is not part of the Foreign, Commonwealth and Development Office but draws on its support. On Diego Garcia the administration is represented by a Royal Navy commander, the Commissioner's Representative, known as the "Brit Rep", who is also the officer commanding British forces on the island and acts as Principal Immigration Officer and Registrar of Births, Deaths and Marriages.

Section 9 of the 2004 Order declares that "no person has the right of abode in the Territory", and under the British Indian Ocean Territory (Immigration) Order 2004 no one may enter or be present without a permit, apart from members of the armed forces, public officers and listed contractors' personnel. The territory has four levels of courts: a Magistrate's Court, a Supreme Court, which may sit in the United Kingdom, a Court of Appeal and, at the apex, the Judicial Committee of the Privy Council.

In 2010 Mauritius told the United Kingdom that it did not recognise the "so-called British Indian Ocean Territory". Since 1992 the Constitution of Mauritius has included the archipelago in the national territory. The Mauritian government states that the archipelago "has been part of the territory of the Republic of Mauritius since at least the eighteenth century", and that its administration as part of Mauritius continued until its "unlawful excision" in 1965.

If the 2025 treaty enters into force, a British bill would end British sovereignty and revoke the 2004 Order, while keeping existing law in force on Diego Garcia. The United Kingdom would exercise sovereign rights over Diego Garcia, defined as the island and a 12-nautical-mile zone around it, by authorisation of Mauritius, which would keep civil and criminal jurisdiction there and the registration of births, deaths and marriages of Mauritians and of people not connected with the base. A Joint Commission, whose decisions require the agreement of both states, would oversee the treaty.

=== Sovereignty dispute ===
The Republic of Mauritius, including the Chagos Archipelago and Tromelin, which it claims

==== Positions of the parties ====
Mauritius regards the archipelago as part of its territory, as its constitution provides (see § Administration), and says that the United Kingdom illegally excised it before independence "in violation of international law and United Nations General Assembly resolutions". It relies on the principles of self-determination and territorial integrity set out in the Declaration on the Granting of Independence to Colonial Countries and Peoples (General Assembly resolution 1514 (XV) of 1960), and argues that its decolonisation therefore "was, and remains, incomplete". It also argues that its ministers' consent to the detachment was not freely given: "the choice that was given to the Mauritian Ministers was, in fact, no choice at all".

The United Kingdom long maintained that the territory "is British and has been since 1814" and "will be ceded when no longer required for defence purposes". It calls the 1965 agreement "a freely negotiated package", and has argued that resolution 1514 (XV) "was an aspirational instrument" whose provision on territorial integrity did not then reflect customary international law. From 2022 it negotiated with Mauritius on the exercise of sovereignty, and in 2024 the Foreign Secretary, David Lammy, told Parliament that "A binding judgement against the UK seemed inevitable".

The United States, whose navy recorded in 1970 that the islands had been selected for their "unquestioned UK sovereignty and a negligible native population", supported the British position before the International Court of Justice, and in 2019 Mike Pompeo, the Secretary of State, said that it "unequivocally supports UK sovereignty over the British Indian Ocean Territory". In February 2026 Mauritius suspended diplomatic relations with the Maldives, citing its stand that it no longer recognised Mauritian sovereignty; the Maldivian president, Mohamed Muizzu, has claimed a stronger title for the Maldives. The Chagossians are divided (see § Chagossians); a House of Lords committee reported in 2025 that "Some wish to remain part of the UK. Others are supportive of Mauritian sovereignty, provided they have the right to resettle the islands." Some, among them Misley Mandarin, claim a right of self-determination under British sovereignty, but the committee noted that Sir Christopher Greenwood and Philippe Sands had both underlined that "as international law currently stands the Chagossians have no independent right to self-determination as distinct from the colonial unit of Mauritius and Chagos".

==== Origins ====
The dispute arises from the detachment of the archipelago in 1965 (see § History), to which the Mauritian ministers agreed in principle at Lancaster House, during the conference on Mauritian independence, in return for £3 million and undertakings that included the islands' return if the need for the facilities disappeared and the benefit to Mauritius of any minerals or oil. The General Assembly's resolution 2066 (XX) of December 1965 invited the United Kingdom "to take no action which would dismember the Territory of Mauritius and violate its territorial integrity", and resolutions 2232 (XXI) and 2357 (XXII) reiterated in 1966 and 1967 that "the establishment of military bases and installations in these Territories" was incompatible with the UN Charter; the United Kingdom abstained on the first and voted against that paragraph of the others.

Under the 1966 exchange of notes, to which Mauritius was not a party, the territory was to "remain under United Kingdom sovereignty" and be available for the defence needs of both governments, and the Diego Garcia Agreement 1976 provided for an American naval support facility on Diego Garcia. Mauritius became independent in 1968 under a constitution whose definition of its territory excluded the archipelago, and between 1967 and 1973 the islanders were prevented from returning or removed, the British Indian Ocean Territory Immigration Ordinance 1971 having made it unlawful to be in the territory without a permit.

==== Mauritius's claim, 1980–2010 ====
Mauritius generally did not raise the archipelago in public forums until 1980. In July 1980 the Organisation of African Unity demanded that Diego Garcia be "unconditionally returned to Mauritius", and in October the Prime Minister, Seewoosagur Ramgoolam, told the General Assembly that the territory should be restored to Mauritius; the United Kingdom replied that it would be "willing to consider ceding sovereignty" if the islands were no longer required for defence. The Non-Aligned Movement has supported the claim since at least 1983, and the African Union has described the archipelago as "unlawfully excised" from Mauritius.

The United Kingdom declined Mauritian proposals in 2000 and 2001 to negotiate on sovereignty or to refer the dispute jointly to the International Court of Justice. When Mauritius indicated in 2004 that it was prepared to leave the Commonwealth to found the court's jurisdiction, the United Kingdom amended its acceptance of that jurisdiction to exclude disputes with any country that "is or has been a Member of the Commonwealth". In 2009 the two governments held talks "under a sovereignty umbrella", at which the United Kingdom proposed a marine protected area around the archipelago.

==== Litigation by Chagossians ====
Chagossians have litigated separately, mainly in the English courts, over compensation and their right to live in the islands rather than sovereignty. A damages claim begun in 1975 (Vencatessen v Attorney General) led to the £4 million settlement of 1982. In 2000 the High Court quashed the provision of the 1971 ordinance excluding the islanders (Bancoult (No 1)); a group claim for compensation was struck out in 2003 (Chagos Islanders v Attorney General), and American courts held claims against the United States non-justiciable (Bancoult v. McNamara). In 2008 the House of Lords upheld, by three votes to two, orders in council of 2004 that again denied anyone a right of abode (Bancoult (No 2)), and in 2016 the Supreme Court refused to set that decision aside (Bancoult (No 2), 2016). The European Court of Human Rights declared an application by 1,786 Chagossians inadmissible in 2012 (Chagos Islanders v United Kingdom), the Supreme Court rejected a challenge to the marine protected area in 2018 (Bancoult (No 3)), and the courts upheld the government's 2016 decision against resettlement (Hoareau and Bancoult).

==== International proceedings, 2010–2023 ====
After the United Kingdom declared the marine protected area in 2010, Mauritius challenged it in arbitration under the United Nations Convention on the Law of the Sea (Mauritius v United Kingdom). In 2015 the tribunal held, by three votes to two, that it had no jurisdiction over what it characterised as a dispute about land sovereignty, but found that the 1965 agreement had become "a matter of international law between the Parties" at Mauritian independence, and unanimously declared that in establishing the protected area the United Kingdom had breached the convention; the two dissenting arbitrators considered that Mauritius "had no choice" in 1965.

In June 2016, as the government of Anerood Jugnauth prepared to take the matter to the United Nations, the British and American missions in Port Louis warned that a referral to the International Court of Justice "would cause lasting damage to Mauritius' bilateral relations with both the UK and the USA"; the Mauritian Prime Minister's Office called the threat "hostile and totally unacceptable". In June 2017 the General Assembly requested an advisory opinion in resolution 71/292, adopted by 94 votes to 15 with 65 abstentions; the British representative called it "a back-door route to the Court".

In its advisory opinion of 25 February 2019, the court held that "any detachment by the administering Power of part of a non-self-governing territory, unless based on the freely expressed and genuine will of the people of the territory concerned, is contrary to the right to self-determination". It found, by 13 votes to 1, that the detachment "was not based on the free and genuine expression of the will of the people concerned", that the decolonisation of Mauritius had not been lawfully completed, and that the United Kingdom must end its administration "as rapidly as possible". Judge Joan Donoghue, dissenting, considered that the opinion circumvented the absence of British consent to judicial settlement, while Judge Patrick Robinson found that the ministers' "consent" to the detachment "amounts to nothing". Robinson also examined the 1966 UK–US agreement, under which the United Kingdom had made the islands available for defence purposes and undertaken to resettle their inhabitants; he concluded that it conflicted with the right to self-determination, a norm of jus cogens, and was therefore "void by virtue of Article 53 of the VCLT" and "incapable of producing any legal effects", although the court's operative conclusions made no such finding. In resolution 73/295, adopted in May 2019 by 116 votes to 6 with 56 abstentions, the General Assembly affirmed that the archipelago "forms an integral part of the territory of Mauritius", demanded British withdrawal within six months, and called on international organisations not to recognise measures taken by the "British Indian Ocean Territory".

The British government, which had said that an advisory opinion "is not a legally binding judgment" and that "we have no doubt about our sovereignty over the Chagos Archipelago", did not withdraw. The Universal Postal Union stopped handling the territory's stamps (see § Postage stamps), and the legal counsel of the Food and Agriculture Organization advised the Indian Ocean Tuna Commission that it would be "anomalous" to treat British membership in respect of the territory as still valid. In the Mauritius–Maldives maritime boundary case, a special chamber of the International Tribunal for the Law of the Sea held in 2021 that "Mauritius' sovereignty over the Chagos Archipelago can be inferred from the ICJ's determinations"; the United Kingdom, not a party, had said that the proceedings "can have no effect for the UK".

==== Negotiations and the 2025 treaty ====
The two governments opened negotiations "on the exercise of sovereignty" in November 2022, and on 3 October 2024 the prime ministers Keir Starmer and Pravind Jugnauth announced a political agreement under which the United Kingdom would accept Mauritian sovereignty over the whole archipelago. Jugnauth's successor, Navin Ramgoolam, called it "a sell-out" and renegotiated its financial terms and the conditions for extending the lease. The treaty signed on 22 May 2025 provides that "Mauritius is sovereign over the Chagos Archipelago in its entirety, including Diego Garcia". Mauritius authorises the United Kingdom to exercise its sovereign rights over Diego Garcia for an initial 99 years, extendable by 40 (see § Military use); the United Kingdom makes annual payments starting at £165 million, provides £40 million for a Chagossian trust fund and is to help Mauritius establish a marine protected area; and Mauritius may resettle the islands other than Diego Garcia.

The treaty was welcomed by the United States, India and the African Union, and supported by the Chagos Refugees Group, but opposed by the Conservative and Reform UK parties and by some Chagossians, mainly in the United Kingdom, who demanded a say in the islands' future. UN special rapporteurs said that it "appears to be at variance with the Chagossians' right to return", and the Committee on the Elimination of Racial Discrimination called for its ratification to be suspended. Two Chagossian women born on Diego Garcia who opposed the treaty said that they had asked the committee to act. In January 2026 President Donald Trump called the transfer "an act of GREAT STUPIDITY"; in April the British government said that his change of position had made it "impossible to agree at political level" an update to the 1966 exchange of notes needed for ratification, and the implementing bill lapsed on 29 April. After Trump told Starmer's successor, Andy Burnham, in September that he expected him to reconsider the "terrible deal", the government said in October that an agreement "must protect UK interests and command US support". In November Burnham said that the government was in discussion with the United States "to see how we might recast the arrangement that better meets their concerns", and he and Ramgoolam agreed at the Commonwealth summit in Antigua to work on a shared plan to make further progress by the end of the year. Mauritius, which has said that it is exploring legal avenues, calls its sovereignty "non-negotiable"; as of November 2026 the treaty had not entered into force.

Some Chagossian opponents of the treaty went to court: in March 2026 the High Court refused permission for a claim that Chagossians should have been consulted (Pompe and Mandarin). In December 2025 opponents in Britain formed a self-declared Chagossian Government‑in‑Exile, which PA Media has called "the unrecognised Chagossian government", and in February 2026 four Chagossians led by its interim first minister, Mandarin, landed without permits on Île du Coin. In the resulting case (Mandarin v Commissioner) the territory's Supreme Court in March 2026 quashed the constitutional provision denying a right of abode but held the claimants to be on the island unlawfully; its orders were stayed pending an appeal heard in July 2026, on which judgment was due on 12 November 2026.

==== Key decisions and resolutions ====
Votes are given as in favour–against–abstaining.

Key decisions and resolutions on the sovereignty of the Chagos Archipelago
| Year | Body | Instrument or decision | Outcome |
|---|---|---|---|
| 1965 | UN General Assembly | Resolution 2066 (XX) | Invited the United Kingdom to take no action that would dismember Mauritius; 89–0–18, the United Kingdom abstaining |
| 1966 | UN General Assembly | Resolution 2232 (XXI) | Reiterated that military bases in the territories concerned were incompatible with the UN Charter; 93–0–24, that paragraph 72–18–27 |
| 1967 | UN General Assembly | Resolution 2357 (XXII) | Repeated that declaration; 86–0–27, that paragraph 78–16–16 |
| 1980 | Organisation of African Unity | Resolution AHG/Res. 99 (XVII) | Demanded that Diego Garcia "be unconditionally returned to Mauritius" |
| 2015 | Arbitral tribunal under the Law of the Sea Convention | Mauritius v United Kingdom | The 1965 undertakings legally binding; the marine protected area in breach of the convention (unanimous) |
| 2017 | UN General Assembly | Resolution 71/292 | Requested an advisory opinion from the International Court of Justice; 94–15–65 |
| 2019 | International Court of Justice | Advisory opinion | Decolonisation of Mauritius not lawfully completed; the United Kingdom to end its administration "as rapidly as possible" (13–1) |
| 2019 | UN General Assembly | Resolution 73/295 | Affirmed that the archipelago is part of Mauritius; demanded British withdrawal within six months; 116–6–56 |
| 2021 | ITLOS special chamber | Mauritius/Maldives (preliminary objections) | Mauritius "can be regarded as the coastal State" for the archipelago; the Maldives' objections rejected |
| 2021 | Universal Postal Union congress | Decision on resolution 73/295 | Acknowledged the archipelago as part of Mauritius; 77–6–41 |
| 2022 | Legal Counsel of the FAO | Opinion to the Indian Ocean Tuna Commission | British membership in respect of the territory "anomalous"; the commission has deferred a decision |
| 2023 | ITLOS special chamber | Mauritius/Maldives (merits) | Maritime boundary within 200 nautical miles fixed (unanimous) |
| 2025 | United Kingdom and Mauritius | Treaty of 22 May 2025 | Mauritius sovereign over the whole archipelago; signed but not in force (November 2026) |
| 2025 | Committee on the Elimination of Racial Discrimination | Decision 1 (2025) | Called on both states to suspend ratification of the treaty |

=== Military use ===
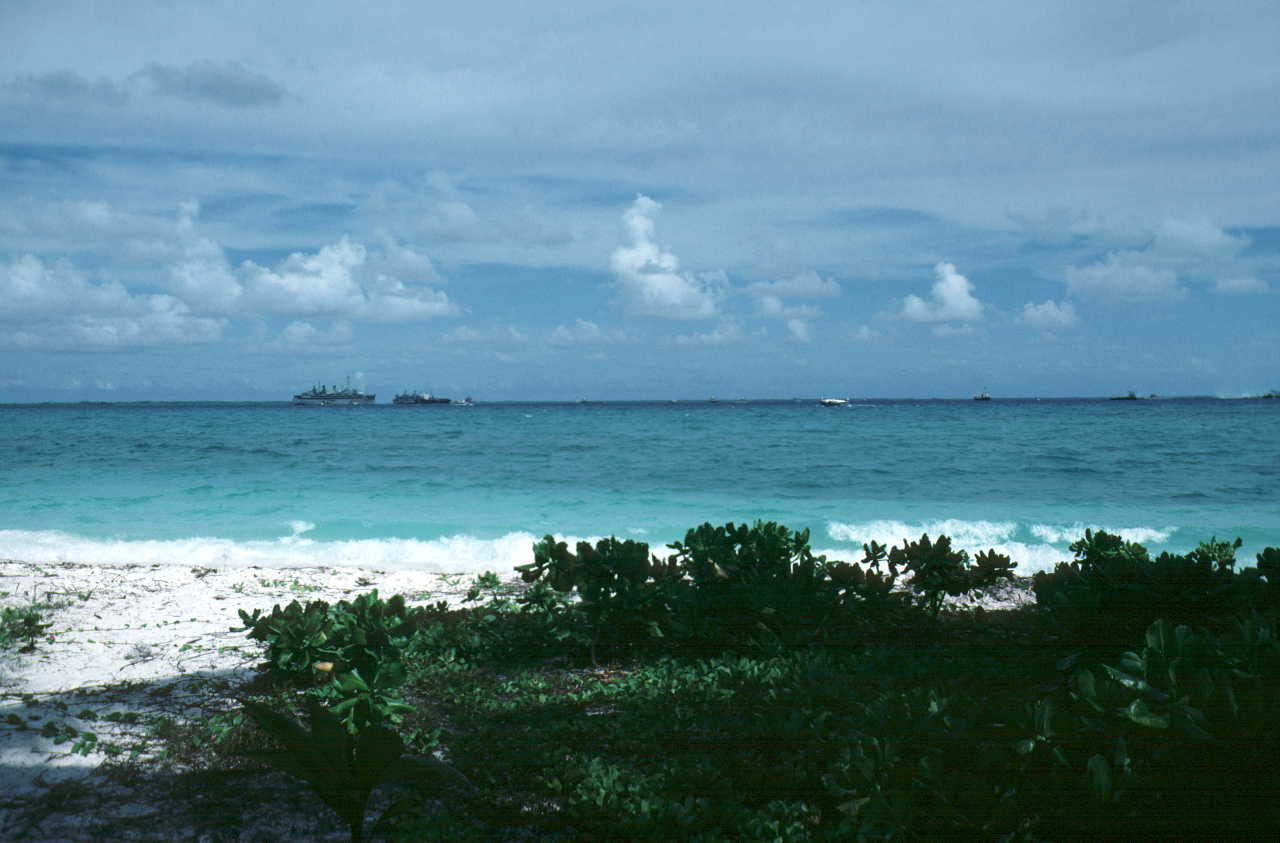
Pre-positioned support ships in the lagoon of Diego Garcia, 1982

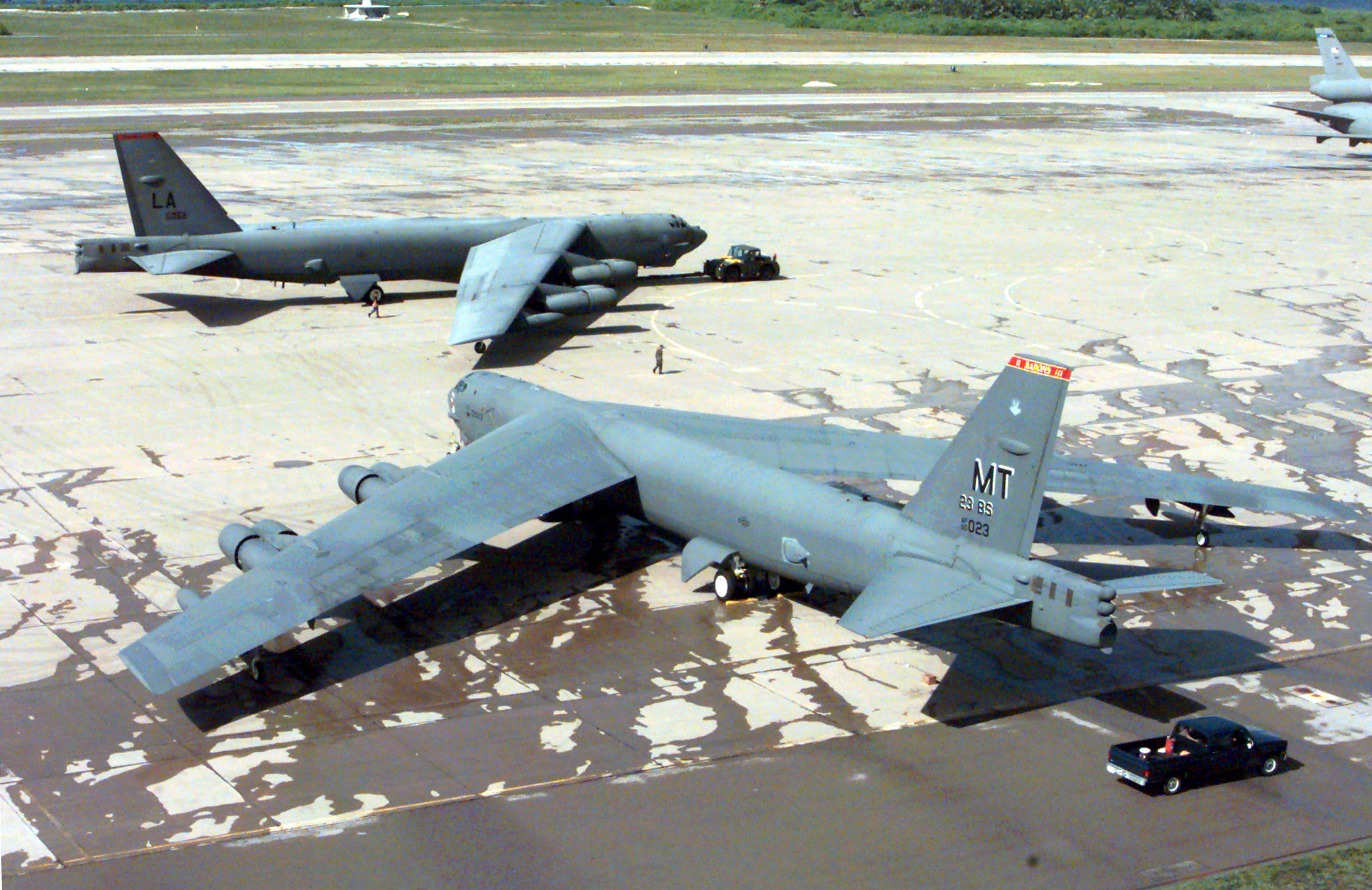
US Air Force B-52H bombers on the flight line at Diego Garcia during Operation Southern Watch, January 1999

Diego Garcia is the site of a joint British–American military base, now known as Naval Support Facility Diego Garcia. The 1966 exchange of notes made the territory available for the defence purposes of both governments for an initial 50 years, followed by a further 20 unless either side gave notice, and in 2016 the British government announced that the arrangements would "continue as they stand until 30 December 2036". Construction began in March 1971. Notes of 1972 approved "a limited naval communications facility on Diego Garcia", and the Diego Garcia Agreement 1976 allowed its development into "a support facility of the United States Navy"; apart from the normal movements of ships and aircraft, its use is a matter for the joint decision of the two governments.

The British government agreed in 1974 to an American proposal to expand the facility, saying that it was "desirable in the general Western interest to balance increased Soviet activities in the Indian Ocean area". According to the legal scholar Peter Sand, the base was a staging area for 20 B-52 bombers during the Gulf War of 1990–91, and, because of the atoll's low average elevation of about 1.3 m, it has been singled out as the American overseas base most immediately threatened by global warming.

The base has an airfield, a deep-water port that can berth nuclear-powered submarines, a logistics hub, and communications and surveillance facilities; the British government describes it as "strategically critical", and says that it has been used for operations in Iraq and Afghanistan and against the Islamic State. In 2008 the Foreign Secretary told Parliament that, contrary to earlier assurances, it had been used for two rendition flights in 2002. In February 2026 British media reported that the government had refused an American request to use it for any pre-emptive strike on Iran.

Under the 2025 treaty Mauritius would authorise the United Kingdom to exercise sovereign rights over Diego Garcia for an initial 99 years, extendable by 40 years if the parties agreed, with "unrestricted access, basing and overflight" there; any installation between 12 and 24 nautical miles from the island would require a joint decision. The United States Department of State welcomed the treaty and commended the two governments' "commitment to ensure that Diego Garcia remains fully operational for the duration of this agreement".

== Population ==
=== Chagossians ===
The Chagossians, also known as Ilois, are the people born in the archipelago and their descendants. They are descended mainly from the enslaved Africans and Malagasy brought to the plantations from the 1780s, most of whom arrived through Mauritius, and from labourers recruited in Mauritius and later in Seychelles who joined them after emancipation. By the end of the 19th century they had formed a distinct island society, mostly Roman Catholic; their music and dance, Sega tambour Chagos, was inscribed by UNESCO in 2019 as intangible cultural heritage in need of urgent safeguarding. The 1964 Anglo-American survey counted 993 people on the three inhabited atolls; the arbitral tribunal in Mauritius v United Kingdom put the Chagossian population in 1965, including people born in the islands, at between 1,500 and 1,750.

After their removal most of the islanders lived in Mauritius and a minority in Seychelles. The British Overseas Territories Act 2002 made them British citizens, and many moved to the United Kingdom, mainly to Crawley in West Sussex; in 2022 the British government estimated that there were about 10,000 Chagossians in the United Kingdom, Mauritius and Seychelles. Mauritius regards them as its nationals. The community is divided over the islands' future: the Mauritius-based Chagos Refugees Group supports the 2025 treaty, while groups based in Britain such as Chagossian Voices and BIOT Citizens oppose it. In December 2025 a poll of Chagossians in Britain organised by the Great British PAC chose Misley Mandarin as interim "first minister" of a self-declared Chagossian Government‑in‑Exile, which the news agency PA Media has called "the unrecognised Chagossian government".

=== Present population ===
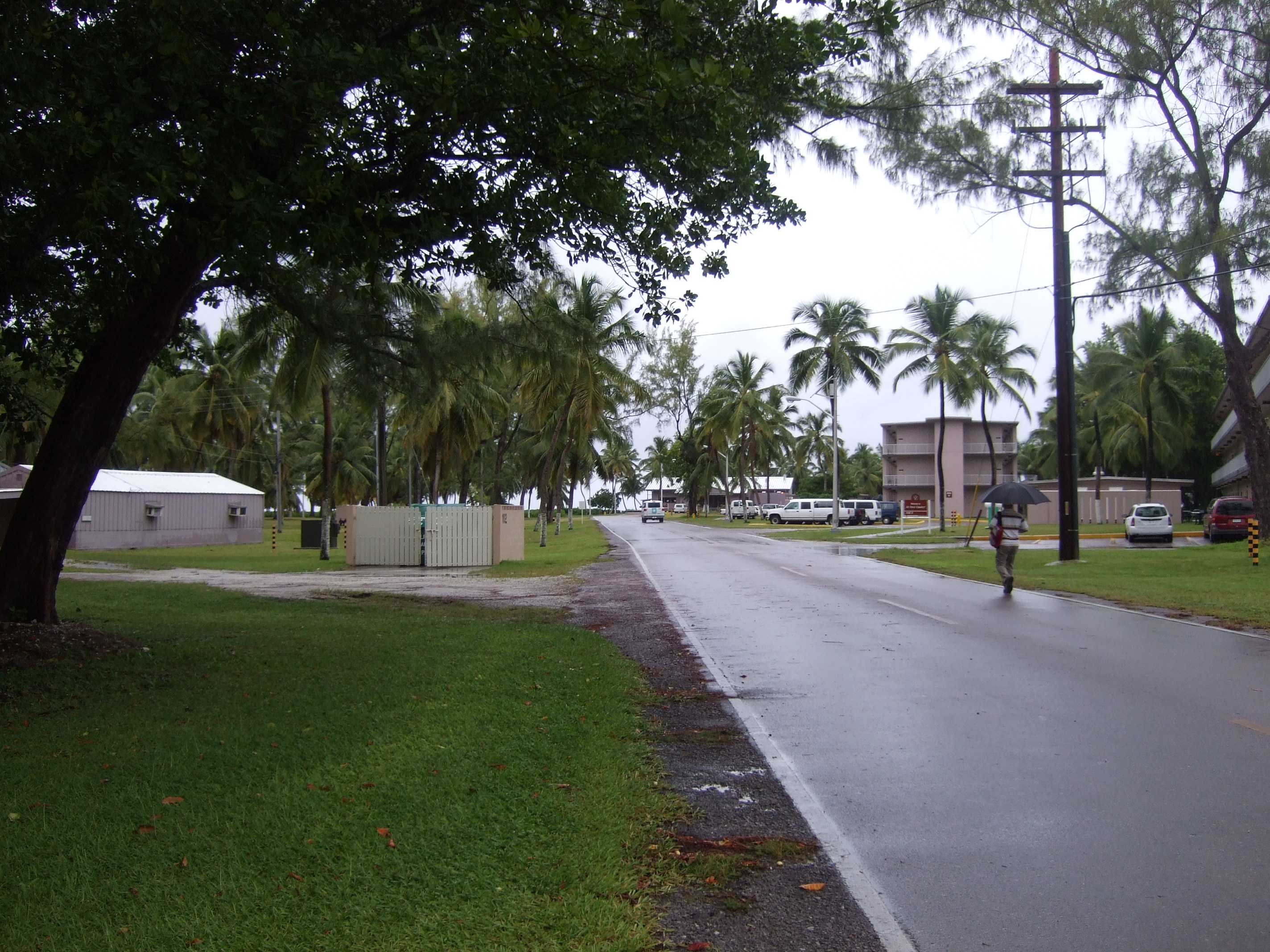
A street on Diego Garcia, 2007

The archipelago has no permanent inhabitants. According to the territory's administration, there are ordinarily around 2,000 people on Diego Garcia, mostly British and American military personnel, officials of the administration and civilian contractors who maintain and operate the military facility. The base's main contractor, KBR, employed about 1,200 workers from the Philippines, India, Kenya and Mauritius in 2024, according to The Observer.

In 2011 the US Navy said that only unaccompanied active-duty military personnel were posted to Diego Garcia. In September 2022 the head of the Philippine Department of Migrant Workers, Susan Ople, said that around 800 Filipino workers were stranded on the island after KBR had allegedly barred them from going on holiday; according to The Washington Post, the company said that flights had been cancelled for lack of demand and because of COVID-19.

Since February 2026 a small group of Chagossians has lived without permits on Île du Coin, in Peros Banhos: four landed on 16 February and two more went ashore on 26 February, and six Chagossians were living on the island in September 2026.

=== Languages ===
The Chagossians' language, Chagos Kreol or Chagossian Creole, emerged in the 19th century and is related to the creoles of Mauritius and Seychelles. It is a French-lexified creole with a mainly Bantu and Malagasy substrate; one study found the islanders' speech closest to that of conservative speakers of Rodriguan Creole. Since the expulsion it has been spoken as a heritage language away from the islands, and a 2024 survey by linguists and members of the group Chagossian Voices rated its vitality at 6b on the Expanded Graded Intergenerational Disruption Scale.

=== Sport ===
In the plantation era, holidays on the islands were marked by sports days with donkey races, sack races, tug of war and swimming competitions. The Chagos Football Association, formed in 2013 in the Chagossian community of Crawley, fields a Chagos Islands team in competitions for sides outside FIFA; at the 2016 ConIFA World Football Cup in Abkhazia the team lost all four of its matches.

== Economy ==
The coconut plantations closed between 1971 and 1973, and economic activity is now concentrated on Diego Garcia, around the military installations. The territory's administration has its own budget, set each year by an ordinance.

=== Mooring permits ===
Visiting yachts may be granted permits to moor in the outer islands only where this is essential for safe passage across the Indian Ocean; permits cost £250 a week from 1 July 2024 and last at most 28 days, and charter vessels and cruise ships are excluded. Yachts may moor only at approved sites: off Île Boddam and the islands of Fouquet and Takamaka in the Salomon Islands, and off Île Diamante, Île du Coin and Fouquet in Peros Banhos. Since 31 March 2026 the administration has paused substantive consideration of new permit applications, except in exceptional circumstances, because of litigation about entry to the territory.

=== Postage stamps ===
The British Indian Ocean Territory has issued its own postage stamps and coins; its administration no longer produces them, but past stamp issues and first-day covers are sold online by the BIOT Post Office on Diego Garcia. In August 2021, acting on resolution 73/295, the Universal Postal Union decided that it would "no longer register, distribute or forward postage stamps issued by the 'British Indian Ocean Territory'". Under the 2025 treaty Mauritius would retain the issue of stamps and coins, and the licensing of postal services unrelated to the base on Diego Garcia.

=== .io domain ===
The country code top-level domain .io, assigned to the British Indian Ocean Territory, was delegated in 1997 and became popular with technology companies. Its registry, Internet Computer Bureau, was bought by Afilias in 2017 for about $70 million and is now a subsidiary of Identity Digital. According to the industry publication Domain Incite, the registry had a turnover of £16.4 million in 2021, and the British government received nothing from it beyond ordinary corporation tax.

In 2021 the Chagos Refugees Group UK complained to the Irish national contact point under the OECD Guidelines for Multinational Enterprises against Afilias and two of its subsidiaries, seeking the return of the domain and royalties for its use. The companies declined the contact point's offer of good offices, and in September 2023 it made recommendations on human rights due diligence but decided not to follow up the complaint.

In November 2024 ICANN said that "IO" remained in the ISO 3166-1 standard on which it relies, and that a change of sovereignty would probably lead the standard's maintainers to review the code. If the code were removed, ICANN's retirement policy would allow a five-year period, which might be extended, for the domain to be phased out; if it were retained, its management might need an "operational nexus" with Mauritius. ICANN added that it was "not a foregone conclusion that a change in sovereignty will result in a change to the .io domain".

=== Resettlement and development proposals ===
A plan published in 2008 by the Chagos Refugees Group and the UK Chagos Support Association put the cost of resettlement at £25 million over five years. A feasibility study by KPMG for the British government, published in 2015, assessed settlements of 150 to 1,500 people relying on infrastructure on Diego Garcia, with indicative capital costs of £32.4 million to £423.3 million. In 2016 the government decided against resettlement "on the grounds of feasibility, defence and security interests, and cost to the British taxpayer". Under the 2025 treaty Mauritius would be free to resettle the islands other than Diego Garcia, but any development on the land of the outer islands would first be subject to a Mauritian "Security Review", in which the United Kingdom could make submissions.

== Infrastructure ==
=== Transport ===
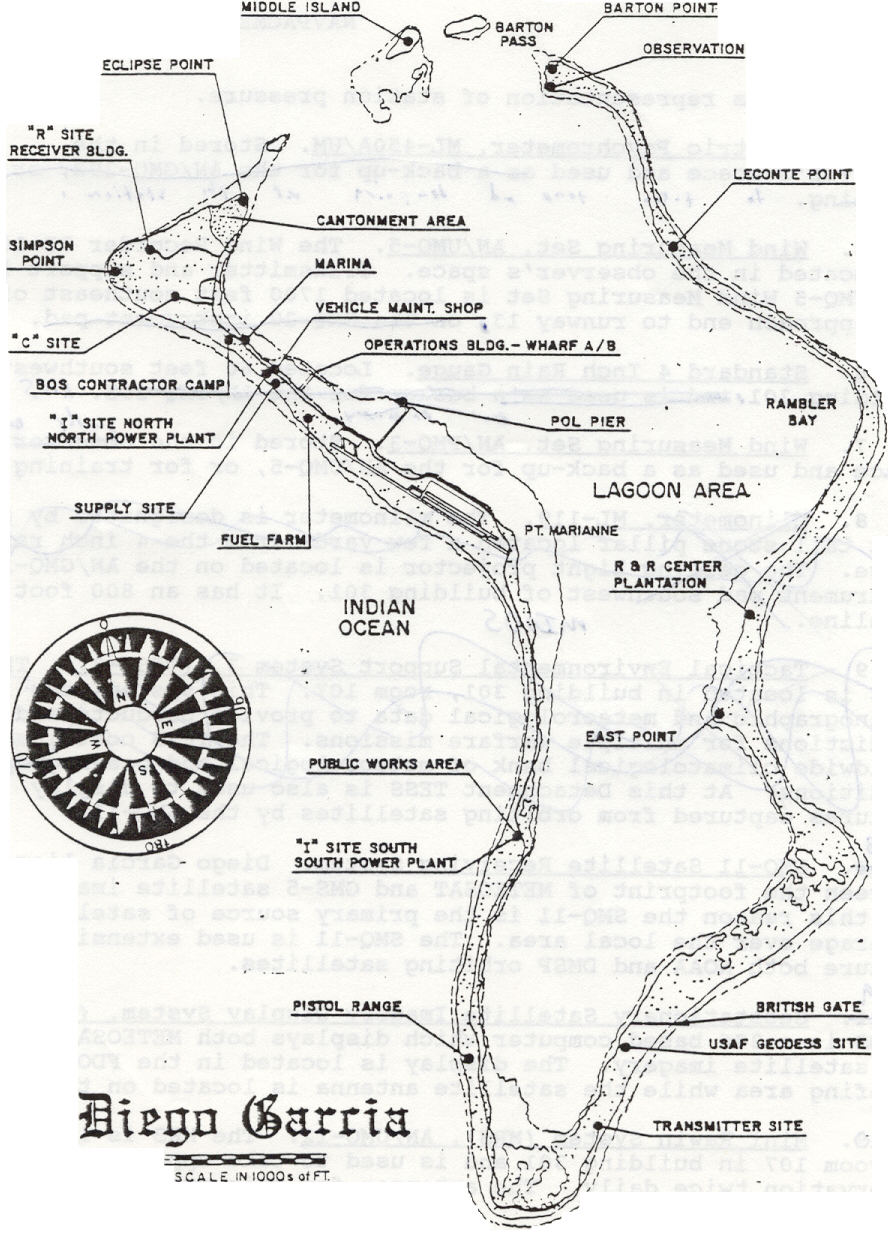
Map of Diego Garcia from the US Navy's Local Area Forecaster's Handbook for Diego Garcia, about 2002

Diego Garcia has an airfield and a deep-water port, both part of the military base. There are no commercial flights and no public access: the administration describes the territory as "not a tourist destination", requires a permit in advance of travel, and limits access to Diego Garcia to people connected with the military facility or the administration. Under the 1966 agreement, commercial aircraft may use military airfields in the territory only exceptionally, with British permission. Unauthorised vessels may not approach within three nautical miles of Diego Garcia, and yachts with permits may anchor only at approved sites in the outer islands.

=== Communications ===
The container ship SLNC Corsica in the lagoon of Diego Garcia, January 2020 (left), and the shore facility of the CTBTO's hydroacoustic station HA08 in the British Indian Ocean Territory, 2000 (right)

The International Telecommunication Union assigns the international telephone code +246 to Diego Garcia. Telephone, broadband internet, 4G and GSM mobile services and television rebroadcasting are provided by Sure (Diego Garcia) Limited, formerly Cable & Wireless (Diego Garcia), which says that it has operated on the island since 1982 under a licence from the British government. The American Armed Forces Radio and Television Service broadcasts to military personnel on the island. The territory's internet domain is .io, and its post office is on Diego Garcia (see § Economy).

In February and March 2022 a cable ship laid a fibre-optic branch to Diego Garcia from the Oman Australia Cable, a commercial submarine cable between Perth and Oman; according to Reuters, the United States Department of Defense paid for about a third of the US$300 million cable on condition that it include the branch, and in 2023 the US Pacific Fleet confirmed the link. The island also hosts one of the four dedicated ground antennas of the Global Positioning System and a telescope array of the Ground-based Electro-Optical Deep Space Surveillance system, which tracks orbital debris. In 2011 the US Navy's media centre on the island broadcast more than 30 television channels and three radio stations, whose programmes were received by satellite from the Armed Forces Radio and Television Service in California.

=== Utilities and services ===
A supplemental arrangement of 1982 under the 1976 agreement contains provisions on Diego Garcia's limited resources and drinking water, and on dumping, dredging and reef blasting. The island has no hospital-grade health facility, and workers and military personnel who become seriously ill are usually flown to a hospital in Singapore.

The US dollar is used on the islands. In 2011 the facilities on Diego Garcia included a gym, tennis courts, a football pitch, a swimming pool, running and cycling trails, a library and a nightly outdoor cinema run by the US Navy's Morale, Welfare and Recreation department.

== In popular culture ==
The expulsion of the islanders is the subject of several novels. Shenaz Patel's Le Silence des Chagos (2005), inspired by the deportation of the Chagossians, received the Prix Soroptimist de la Romancière francophone in 2006 and was translated into English as Silence of the Chagos (2019). Caroline Laurent's Rivage de la colère (2020), whose heroine lives on Diego Garcia at the time of Mauritian independence, won the Prix Maison de la Presse and the Grand Prix des blogueurs littéraires and was translated into English as An Impossible Return (2022). Diego Garcia (2022), by Natasha Soobramanien and Luke Williams, in which two writers seek to write in solidarity with the Chagossians, won the Goldsmiths Prize. Documentaries about the islanders include John Pilger's Stealing a Nation (2004) and David Constantin's Diego l'interdite; other works are described in Chagossians § In culture and media.

== See also ==
- List of islands in the Chagos Archipelago
- Outer Islands of Mauritius
- Scattered Islands in the Indian Ocean

== Sources ==
=== Court and tribunal decisions ===
- R (Bancoult) v Secretary of State for Foreign and Commonwealth Affairs, EWHC (Admin) 1038 (High Court (Divisional Court) 11 May 2006).
- Chagos Islanders v Attorney General and HM BIOT Commissioner, EWHC (QB) 2222 (High Court 9 October 2003).
- R (Hoareau and Bancoult) v Secretary of State for Foreign and Commonwealth Affairs, EWHC (Admin) 221 (High Court (Divisional Court) 8 February 2019).
- Legal Consequences of the Separation of the Chagos Archipelago from Mauritius in 1965, Advisory Opinion (PDF). I.C.J. Reports 2019. International Court of Justice. 25 February 2019. p. 95.
- Dispute concerning delimitation of the maritime boundary between Mauritius and Maldives in the Indian Ocean (Mauritius/Maldives), Judgment (PDF). International Tribunal for the Law of the Sea. 28 April 2023.
- Dispute concerning delimitation of the maritime boundary between Mauritius and Maldives in the Indian Ocean (Mauritius/Maldives), Preliminary Objections, Judgment (PDF). ITLOS Reports 2020–2021. International Tribunal for the Law of the Sea. 28 January 2021. p. 17.
- R (Mandarin and others) v HM Commissioner for the British Indian Ocean Territory (Supreme Court of the British Indian Ocean Territory 31 March 2026), Text.
- Memorial of the Republic of Mauritius. Vol. I. Permanent Court of Arbitration. 1 August 2012.
- Reply of the Republic of Mauritius. Vol. I. Permanent Court of Arbitration. 18 November 2013.
- Written Statement of the Republic of Mauritius (PDF). Vol. I. International Court of Justice. 1 March 2018.
- In the Matter of the Chagos Marine Protected Area Arbitration (Mauritius v. United Kingdom): Award (PDF). Permanent Court of Arbitration. 18 March 2015.
- Counter-Memorial of the United Kingdom. Permanent Court of Arbitration. 15 July 2013.
- Written Statement of the United Kingdom (PDF). International Court of Justice. 15 February 2018.
- Written Statement of the African Union (PDF). International Court of Justice. 1 March 2018.
- R v Secretary of State for the Foreign and Commonwealth Office, ex parte Bancoult, EWHC (Admin) 413 (High Court (Divisional Court) 3 November 2000).
- R (Bancoult) v Secretary of State for Foreign and Commonwealth Affairs (No 2), UKHL 61 (House of Lords 22 October 2008).
- R (Bancoult No 3) v Secretary of State for Foreign and Commonwealth Affairs, UKSC 3 (Supreme Court 8 February 2018).
- R (Bancoult No 2) v Secretary of State for Foreign and Commonwealth Affairs, UKSC 35 (Supreme Court 29 June 2016).
- Bancoult v. McNamara, 445 F.3d 427 (D.C. Cir. 21 April 2006).
- "Cause list, 15–17 July 2026: HM Commissioner for the British Indian Ocean Territory v The King (on the application of Mandarin & Ors), [2026] BIOT CA (Civ) 1" (PDF). British Indian Ocean Territory Court of Appeal. 2026.
- "Notice of judgment hand down: His Majesty's Commissioner for the British Indian Ocean Territory v The King (on the application of Mandarin & Ors), [2026] BIOT CA (Civ) 1" (PDF). British Indian Ocean Territory Court of Appeal. 4 November 2026.
- Donoghue, Joan (25 February 2019). "Dissenting opinion of Judge Donoghue" (PDF). Legal Consequences of the Separation of the Chagos Archipelago from Mauritius in 1965, Advisory Opinion. I.C.J. Reports 2019. International Court of Justice. p. 261.
- R (Hoareau and Bancoult) v Secretary of State for Foreign and Commonwealth Affairs, EWCA Civ 1010 (Court of Appeal 30 July 2020).
- Kateka, James; Wolfrum, Rüdiger (18 March 2015). Dissenting and Concurring Opinion of Judge James Kateka and Judge Rüdiger Wolfrum. Permanent Court of Arbitration.
- R (Mandarin and others) v HM Commissioner for the British Indian Ocean Territory: Order (Supreme Court of the British Indian Ocean Territory 31 March 2026), Text.
- R (Pompe) v Secretary of State for Foreign, Commonwealth and Development Affairs; R (Mandarin) v Secretary of State for Foreign, Commonwealth and Development Affairs, EWHC (Admin) 529 (High Court 10 March 2026).
- Robinson, Patrick (25 February 2019). "Separate opinion of Judge Robinson" (PDF). Legal Consequences of the Separation of the Chagos Archipelago from Mauritius in 1965, Advisory Opinion. I.C.J. Reports 2019. International Court of Justice. p. 294.
- Written Statement of the United States of America (PDF). International Court of Justice. 1 March 2018.

=== United Nations documents ===
- Committee on the Elimination of Racial Discrimination (2 December 2025). Decision 1 (2025): Mauritius and the United Kingdom (early warning and urgent action procedure, INT/CERD/EWU/11263), advance unedited version (Report). Office of the United Nations High Commissioner for Human Rights.
- List of Recommendation ITU-T E.164 assigned country codes (position on 15 December 2016) (PDF) (Report). Annex to ITU Operational Bulletin No. 1114. International Telecommunication Union. 15 December 2016.
- "Agreement between Mauritius and the UK fails to guarantee rights of Chagossians, say UN experts" (Press release). Office of the United Nations High Commissioner for Human Rights. 10 June 2025.
- United Nations Secretary-General (18 May 2020). Advisory opinion of the International Court of Justice on the legal consequences of the separation of the Chagos Archipelago from Mauritius in 1965: Report of the Secretary-General (A/74/834) (Report). United Nations.
- "Sega tambour Chagos". Intangible Cultural Heritage. UNESCO. 2019.
- United Nations General Assembly (22 May 2019). Official Records, Seventy-third session, 83rd plenary meeting, Wednesday, 22 May 2019, 10 a.m. (A/73/PV.83) (Report). United Nations.
- United Nations General Assembly (24 May 2019). Resolution adopted by the General Assembly on 22 May 2019: 73/295. Advisory opinion of the International Court of Justice on the legal consequences of the separation of the Chagos Archipelago from Mauritius in 1965 (A/RES/73/295) (Report). United Nations.
- "Press release: UPU adopts UN resolution on Chagos Archipelago" (Press release). Universal Postal Union. 27 August 2021. Archived from the original on 26 February 2025.
- Legal Counsel of the Food and Agriculture Organization of the United Nations (6 May 2022). Note in relation to agenda item 4 of the 26th Session of the Indian Ocean Tuna Commission: "Clarification of the Status of the United Kingdom's Membership in the IOTC" (IOTC-2022-S26-12) (PDF) (Report). Archived (PDF) from the original on 23 June 2025.
- Indian Ocean Tuna Commission (2025). Report of the 29th Session of the Indian Ocean Tuna Commission, Réunion, 13–17 April 2025 (IOTC-2025-S29-R) (PDF) (Report).
- United Nations General Assembly (16 December 1965). "2066 (XX). Question of Mauritius". Resolutions adopted by the General Assembly during its twentieth session. Official Records of the General Assembly, Twentieth Session, Supplement No. 14 (A/6014) – via Memorial of Mauritius, Annex 38.
- "Declarations recognizing as compulsory the jurisdiction of the International Court of Justice under Article 36, paragraph 2, of the Statute of the Court". United Nations Treaty Collection. United Nations.
- United Nations General Assembly (20 December 1966). Official Records, Twenty-first Session, 1500th plenary meeting, 20 December 1966 (A/PV.1500) (Report). United Nations.
- United Nations General Assembly (19 December 1967). Official Records, Twenty-second Session, 1641st plenary meeting, 19 December 1967 (A/PV.1641) (Report). United Nations.
- United Nations General Assembly (22 June 2017). Official Records, Seventy-first session, 88th plenary meeting, Thursday, 22 June 2017 (A/71/PV.88) (Report). United Nations.

=== Treaties and official documents ===
- "About". British Indian Ocean Territory Administration.
- "Environment". British Indian Ocean Territory Administration.
- "Governance". British Indian Ocean Territory Administration.
- "History". British Indian Ocean Territory Administration.
- "Mooring Site Plots". British Indian Ocean Territory Administration.
- "Stamps and Coins". British Indian Ocean Territory Administration.
- "Terrestrial Protected Areas". British Indian Ocean Territory Administration.
- "Visiting". British Indian Ocean Territory Administration.
- "Marine Protected Area". British Indian Ocean Territory Administration.
- "How to apply for a mooring permit". British Indian Ocean Territory Administration.
- "British Overseas Territories Act 2002 (c. 8)". legislation.gov.uk.
- Brown, Thomas (30 October 2025). Diego Garcia Military Base and British Indian Ocean Territory Bill (HL Bill 139 of 2024–26) (Report). Library Briefing LLN-2025-0040. House of Lords Library.
- "The British Indian Ocean Territory (Constitution) Order 2004" (PDF). British Indian Ocean Territory Administration. 10 June 2004.
- Davies, Kim (14 November 2024). "The Chagos Archipelago and the .io domain". ICANN.
- "Klimatafel von Diego Garcia, Chagos-Archipel / Indischer Ozean / Großbritannien" [Climate table of Diego Garcia, Chagos Archipelago, Indian Ocean, United Kingdom] (PDF) (in German). Deutscher Wetterdienst.
- Duncan, Alan (16 November 2016). "Update on the British Indian Ocean Territory (HCWS260)". UK Parliament: Written questions, answers and statements.
- Duncan, Alan (30 April 2019). "British Indian Ocean Territory (HCWS1528)". UK Parliament: Written questions, answers and statements.
- "About Chagos Archipelago". Government of Mauritius.
- "Diego Garcia Military Base and British Indian Ocean Territory Bill". Hansard, House of Commons. 13 April 2026.
- "Diego Garcia Military Base and British Indian Ocean Territory Bill". Hansard, House of Lords. 13 October 2026.
- "Terrorist Suspects (Renditions)". Hansard, House of Commons. 21 February 2008.
- ".io Top-Level Domain". Root Zone Database. Internet Assigned Numbers Authority.
- "The British Indian Ocean Territory (Immigration) Order 2004" (PDF). British Indian Ocean Territory Administration. 10 June 2004.
- Loft, Philip; Curtis, John (8 September 2025). 2025 treaty on the British Indian Ocean Territory/Chagos Archipelago (Report). Research Briefing CBP-10273. House of Commons Library.
- National Geospatial-Intelligence Agency (2026). Sailing Directions (Enroute): East Africa and the South Indian Ocean (PDF). Pub. 171 (15th ed.). Springfield, Virginia: National Geospatial-Intelligence Agency.
- "PM meetings with world leaders at CHOGM" (Press release). Prime Minister's Office, 10 Downing Street. 5 November 2026.
- "Diego Garcia". Ramsar Sites Information Service. Secretariat of the Convention on Wetlands.
- Sheppard, Charles; Carr, Peter; Graham, Nicholas; et al. (July 2012). Conservation and Management in British Indian Ocean Territory (Chagos Archipelago) (PDF) (Report). Archived from the original (PDF) on 2 November 2012.
- "UK secures future of vital Diego Garcia Military Base to protect national security" (Press release). Ministry of Defence and Foreign, Commonwealth and Development Office. 22 May 2025.
- Permanent Mission of the United Kingdom to the United Nations (19 January 2023). Note No. 004/23 to the Secretary-General, with the Written Ministerial Statement of 3 November 2022 (PDF) (Report). United Nations.
- Agreement between the Government of the United Kingdom of Great Britain and Northern Ireland and the Government of the Republic of Mauritius concerning the Chagos Archipelago including Diego Garcia (CS Mauritius No.1/2025, CP 1334) (Report). Foreign, Commonwealth and Development Office. 22 May 2025.
- Exchange of notes constituting an agreement supplementing the above-mentioned agreement, concerning a United States naval support facility on Diego Garcia, British Indian Ocean Territory and replacing the supplementary agreement of 24 October 1972. London, 25 February 1976 (PDF). United Nations Treaty Series. Vol. 1018. United Nations. 1976. pp. 372–381.
- Supplemental arrangement to the above-mentioned agreement relating to the Agreement of 25 February 1976 on the Diego Garcia facility. Signed at Washington on 13 December 1982 (PDF). United Nations Treaty Series. Vol. 2001. United Nations. 1998. pp. 397–400.
- Exchange of notes constituting an agreement between the Government of the United Kingdom of Great Britain and Northern Ireland and the Government of the United States of America concerning the availability for defence purposes of the British Indian Ocean Territory. London, 30 December 1966 (No. 8737) (PDF). United Nations Treaty Series. Vol. 603. United Nations. 1967. pp. 273–290. Also published as UK Treaty Series No. 15 (1967), Cmnd 3231; 18 UST 28; TIAS 6196.
- Exchange of notes constituting an agreement supplementing the above-mentioned agreement concerning a limited United States naval communications facility on Diego Garcia, British Indian Ocean Territory. London, 24 October 1972 (PDF). United Nations Treaty Series. Vol. 866. United Nations. 1973. pp. 302–307.
- "U.S. Support for UK and Mauritius Agreement On Chagos Archipelago" (Press release). United States Department of State. 22 May 2025 – via AllAfrica.
- "British Indian Ocean Territory". The World Factbook. Central Intelligence Agency. Archived from the original on 2 December 2025.
- "Press Statement by H.E. Mahmoud Ali Youssouf, Chairperson of the African Union Commission on the Agreement Between the United Kingdom and the Republic of Mauritius on the Chagos Archipelago and the Establishment of a Strategic Partnership Framework" (Press release). African Union Commission. 23 May 2025.
- "British Indian Ocean Territory (HCWS90)". UK Parliament: Written questions, answers and statements. 5 November 2019.
- House of Lords International Agreements Committee (25 June 2025). UK-Mauritius Agreement on the Chagos Archipelago including Diego Garcia (PDF) (Report). 9th Report of Session 2024–26, HL Paper 146. House of Lords.
- Lammy, David (7 October 2024). Foreign Secretary's statement on the Chagos Islands, 7 October 2024 (Speech). House of Commons. Archived from the original on 13 February 2025.
- NAM Summit Declaration, New Delhi, 7–12 March 1983 (extract) (PDF). Non-Aligned Movement. March 1983 – via Written Statement of Mauritius, Annex 21.
- National Assembly of Mauritius (4 February 2025). Parliamentary Debates (Hansard), Eighth National Assembly, First Session, No. 02 of 2025 (unrevised): Tuesday 4 February 2025 (Report). Archived from the original on 19 March 2025.
- Resolution on the Diego Garcia, AHG/Res. 99 (XVII) (PDF). Organisation of African Unity, Assembly of Heads of State and Government. July 1980 – via Written Statement of Mauritius, Annex 118.
- "Communique: Meeting between the Rt Hon Prime Minister and Senior Officials from the UK and the US on Chagos Archipelago" (PDF) (Press release). Prime Minister's Office, Republic of Mauritius. 24 June 2016 – via ION News.
- "UK and Mauritius joint statement, 3 October 2024" (Press release). Foreign, Commonwealth and Development Office. 3 October 2024.
- "Joint Press Statement from the British High Commission and the Embassy of the United States of America" (PDF) (Press release). British High Commission Port Louis; Embassy of the United States of America, Port Louis. 24 June 2016 – via ION News.
- Office of the Chief of Naval Operations (1970). "39. Paper Prepared in the Office of the Chief of Naval Operations (Moorer): Diego Garcia—Background and Status, 11 February 1970". Foreign Relations of the United States, 1969–1976, Volume XXIV, Middle East Region and Arabian Peninsula, 1969–1972; Jordan, September 1970. Office of the Historian, United States Department of State.
- "Diego Garcia". Hansard, House of Commons (Written Answers). 5 February 1974. HC Deb 5 February 1974 vol 868 cc276–277W.
- "Defence Review". Hansard, House of Commons. 3 December 1974. HC Deb 3 December 1974 vol 882 cc1351–1369.
- Naval Computer and Telecommunications Station Far East Detachment Diego Garcia (January 2011). "Welcome Aboard" (PDF). United States Navy. Archived from the original (PDF) on 5 October 2016.

=== Books and journals ===
- Ballgobin, Dehoutee Vina (2014). "Le patrimoine musical de la République de Maurice : L'Archipel des Chagos (1900–1950)". Revue historique de l'océan Indien (in French) (11): 600–615.
- Carr, Peter; et al. (March 2021). "Status and phenology of breeding seabirds and a review of Important Bird and Biodiversity Areas in the British Indian Ocean Territory". Bird Conservation International. 31 (1): 14–34. doi:10.1017/S0959270920000295.
- "Corals". Chagos Conservation Trust. Archived from the original on 7 July 2012.
- "Fish". Chagos Conservation Trust. Archived from the original on 5 July 2012.
- Dumbraveanu, D.; Sheppard, Charles (n.d.). "Substrate area estimates at different depths for the Chagos Archipelago". Chagos Information Portal (Dataset). Chagos Conservation Trust.
- Duncan, R. A.; Hargraves, R. B. (1990). "^{40}Ar/^{39}Ar geochronology of basement rocks from the Mascarene Plateau, the Chagos Bank, and the Maldives Ridge" (PDF). In Duncan, R. A.; Backman, J.; Peterson, L. C.; et al. (eds.). Proceedings of the Ocean Drilling Program, Scientific Results. Vol. 115. College Station, Texas: Ocean Drilling Program. pp. 43–51. doi:10.2973/odp.proc.sr.115.141.1990.
- Edis, Richard (1993). Peak of Limuria: The Story of Diego Garcia (PDF). London: Bellew Publishing. ISBN 1-85725-070-2 – via Written Statement of the Republic of Mauritius (ICJ), vol. IV, Annex 136 (extracts).
- Graham, Nicholas A. J.; et al. (July 2018). "Seabirds enhance coral reef productivity and functioning in the absence of invasive rats". Nature. 559 (7713): 250–253. doi:10.1038/s41586-018-0202-3.
- Graham, Nicholas A. J.; Spalding, Mark D.; Sheppard, Charles R. C. (July 2010). "Reef shark declines in remote atolls highlight the need for multi-faceted conservation action". Aquatic Conservation: Marine and Freshwater Ecosystems. 20 (5): 543–548. doi:10.1002/aqc.1116.
- Harper, G. A.; Carr, P.; Pitman, H. (2019). "Eradicating black rats from the Chagos – working towards the whole archipelago" (PDF). In Veitch, C. R.; Clout, M. N.; Martin, A. R.; Russell, J. C.; West, C. J. (eds.). Island invasives: scaling up to meet the challenge. Occasional Paper of the IUCN Species Survival Commission no. 62. Gland: IUCN. pp. 26–30.
- Head, Catherine E. I.; et al. (August 2019). "Coral bleaching impacts from back-to-back 2015–2016 thermal anomalies in the remote central Indian Ocean". Coral Reefs. 38 (4): 605–618. doi:10.1007/s00338-019-01821-9.
- Kasstan, Jonathan; Allen, Patrick; Nellan, Pascalina; Sheehan, Michelle (2024). "Chagossian Creole (Indian Ocean and Western Europe) – Language Snapshot". Language Documentation and Description. 24 (1): 1–7. doi:10.25894/ldd.2492.
- Lange, Ines D.; Perry, Chris T. (August 2019). "Bleaching impacts on carbonate production in the Chagos Archipelago: influence of functional coral groups on carbonate budget trajectories". Coral Reefs. 38 (4): 619–624. doi:10.1007/s00338-019-01784-x.
- Mortimer, Jeanne A.; et al. (May 2020). "Estimates of marine turtle nesting populations in the south-west Indian Ocean indicate the importance of the Chagos Archipelago". Oryx. 54 (3): 332–343. doi:10.1017/S0030605319001108.
- Track of the Calcutta East Indiaman, over the Bassas de Chagas in the Indian Ocean (Map). The Oriental Pilot. London: Robert Sayer and John Bennett. 1778. Plate 14 – via National Library of Australia.
- Sheppard, C. R. C.; et al. (March 2012). "Reefs and islands of the Chagos Archipelago, Indian Ocean: why it is the world's largest no-take marine protected area". Aquatic Conservation: Marine and Freshwater Ecosystems. 22 (2): 232–261. doi:10.1002/aqc.1248. PMC 4260629. PMID 25505830.
- Sheppard, Charles; Sheppard, Anne; Fenner, Douglas (May 2020). "Coral mass mortalities in the Chagos Archipelago over 40 years: regional species and assemblage extinctions and indications of positive feedbacks". Marine Pollution Bulletin. 154 111075. doi:10.1016/j.marpolbul.2020.111075.
- Sheppard, Charles; Topp, John (n.d.). "Plant distribution across 59 islands in Chagos over 21 years". Chagos Information Portal (Dataset). Chagos Conservation Trust.
- Stoddart, D. R. (1971). "Settlement and development of Diego Garcia". Atoll Research Bulletin (149). Smithsonian Institution: 209–217.
- Stoddart, D. R. (1971a). "Scientific studies at Diego Garcia Atoll". Atoll Research Bulletin (149). Smithsonian Institution: 1–6.
- Stoddart, D. R. (1971b). "Geomorphology of Diego Garcia Atoll". Atoll Research Bulletin (149). Smithsonian Institution: 7–26.
- Stoddart, D. R. (1971c). "Diego Garcia climate and marine environment". Atoll Research Bulletin (149). Smithsonian Institution: 27–30.
- Vine, David (2009). Island of Shame: The Secret History of the U.S. Military Base on Diego Garcia (PDF). Princeton University Press. ISBN 978-0-691-13869-5 – via Written Statement of the Republic of Mauritius (ICJ), vol. V, Annex 151 (extracts).
- Sand, Peter H. (2018). "The British Indian Ocean Territory: International Legal Black Hole?" (PDF). Zoom-out. Questions of International Law. 55: 35–59.

=== News and other sources ===
- "Diego l'interdite". Africultures (in French).
- Arjanee, Ameerah (2 October 2026). "UK-Mauritius Chagos sovereignty deal stalls amid fears of further delays". Al Jazeera English.
- Badshah, Nadeem (17 February 2026). "Four Chagossians return to islands in attempt to stop British transfer to Mauritius". The Guardian.
- "British stamps banned from Chagos Islands in Indian Ocean". BBC News. 25 August 2021. Archived from the original on 26 August 2021.
- Chambers, Bala (22 October 2021). "Will Britain give citizenship rights to all Chagos islanders?". Al Jazeera English.
- Claburn, Thomas (10 October 2024). "The .io domain isn't going anywhere in the next few years". The Register.
- "Diego Garcia". Fitzcarraldo Editions.
- Baldwin, Clive; Human Rights Watch (15 February 2023). "That's When the Nightmare Started": UK and US Forced Displacement of the Chagossians and Ongoing Colonial Crimes (PDF) (Report). Human Rights Watch. ISBN 979-8-88708-029-1.
- "Ile Maurice: «Qui sont les plus légitimes ? Les déracinés ou les troisièmes générations nées au pays ?»". L'Express (in French). 8 November 2025 – via allAfrica.
- "Chagos : la revendication maldivienne ouvre un nouveau front diplomatique". Le Mauricien (in French). 14 September 2026.
- Lendon, Brad (20 February 2026). "Diego Garcia: Britain blocking use of air bases Trump says would be needed for strikes on Iran, UK media report". CNN.
- "Caroline Laurent, lauréate du Grand prix des blogueurs 2020". Livres Hebdo (in French). 5 January 2021.
- "Caroline Laurent, lauréate du Prix des Rencontres du 2eme titre". Livres Hebdo (in French). 7 June 2021.
- Lynch, David; Ng, Ellie (14 October 2026). "Badenoch and Farage both dig in amid row over Falklands-Chagos 'trade' proposal". Nation.Cymru. PA Media.
- Mallinder, Lorraine (11 February 2025). "'Tug of war': Chagos Islands deal tearing families apart in Mauritius". Al Jazeera English.
- Martin, Daniel (16 December 2025). "Chagos Islanders defy Starmer by forming government in exile". The Telegraph. Archived from the original on 17 December 2025.
- McQue, Katie (9 June 2024). "Migrant workers 'fear for their safety' after deaths on Diego Garcia". The Observer.
- Murphy, Kevin (9 November 2018). "Afilias bought .io for $70 million". Domain Incite.
- Murphy, Kevin (1 November 2023). "Group to seek .io TLD takeover after OECD human rights ruling". Domain Incite.
- Newton, Annilee (1 December 2022). "Anger as Purpose: On Caroline Laurent's An Impossible Return". Asymptote.
- "Chagos Refugees Group United Kingdom, et al. vs. Afilias Ltd". OECD Watch. Archived from the original on 8 December 2025.
- Pilger, John. "Stealing a Nation". johnpilger.com.
- "Silence of the Chagos". Restless Books.
- "Chagossian activists challenge legality of new bilateral agreement". Seychelles Nation. 10 June 2025.
- Spear, Thomas C. "Shenaz Patel". Île en île (in French). Lehman College, City University of New York.
- "About Us". Sure (Diego Garcia) Limited.
- Syal, Rajeev (1 September 2022). "Evicted Chagos Islanders' descendants to get British citizenship". The Guardian.
- Vyawahare, Malavika (15 December 2025). "A deal signals a new chapter for Chagossians, and one of the world's largest marine no-fishing zones". Mongabay.
- Wenban-Smith, Nigel (11 January 2008). "History of the Chagos Archipelago" (PDF). Factsheet 058. Chagos Conservation Trust.
- "India welcomes UK-Mauritius treaty on Chagos". Akashvani News. All India Radio. 23 May 2025.
- Kunda, James (28 February 2026). "Mauritius suspends diplomatic ties with Maldives". Anadolu Agency.
- Lateef, Samaan (5 March 2026). "Mauritius to sue Britain over Chagos delay". The Daily Telegraph – via Yahoo News.
- Ormiston, Simon (23 September 2026). "UK to review Chagos deal after Trump tells Burnham it is 'terrible'". Euronews.
- Stacey, Kiran; Crerar, Pippa (21 January 2026). "How Badenoch's meeting with Mike Johnson led to Trump's Chagos deal rant". The Guardian.
- Stacey, Kiran (5 November 2026). "Burnham wants to 'recast' Chagos Islands deal after US resistance". The Guardian.
- Brock, Joe (6 July 2023). "Inside the subsea cable firm secretly helping America take on China". Reuters. Archived from the original on 4 December 2023.
- Riñoza, Jojo (16 September 2022). "Philippines: Filipino workers stuck at US military base following dispute over vacation". BenarNews.
- Wright, George (7 July 2022). "Chagos Islands FA: The team representing a lost homeland, 6,000 miles away". BBC Sport.
