= Salomon Islands =

Island in the Indian Ocean

Coordinates: 5°19′00″S 72°15′36″E

The Salomon Islands (islands are shown in dark green)

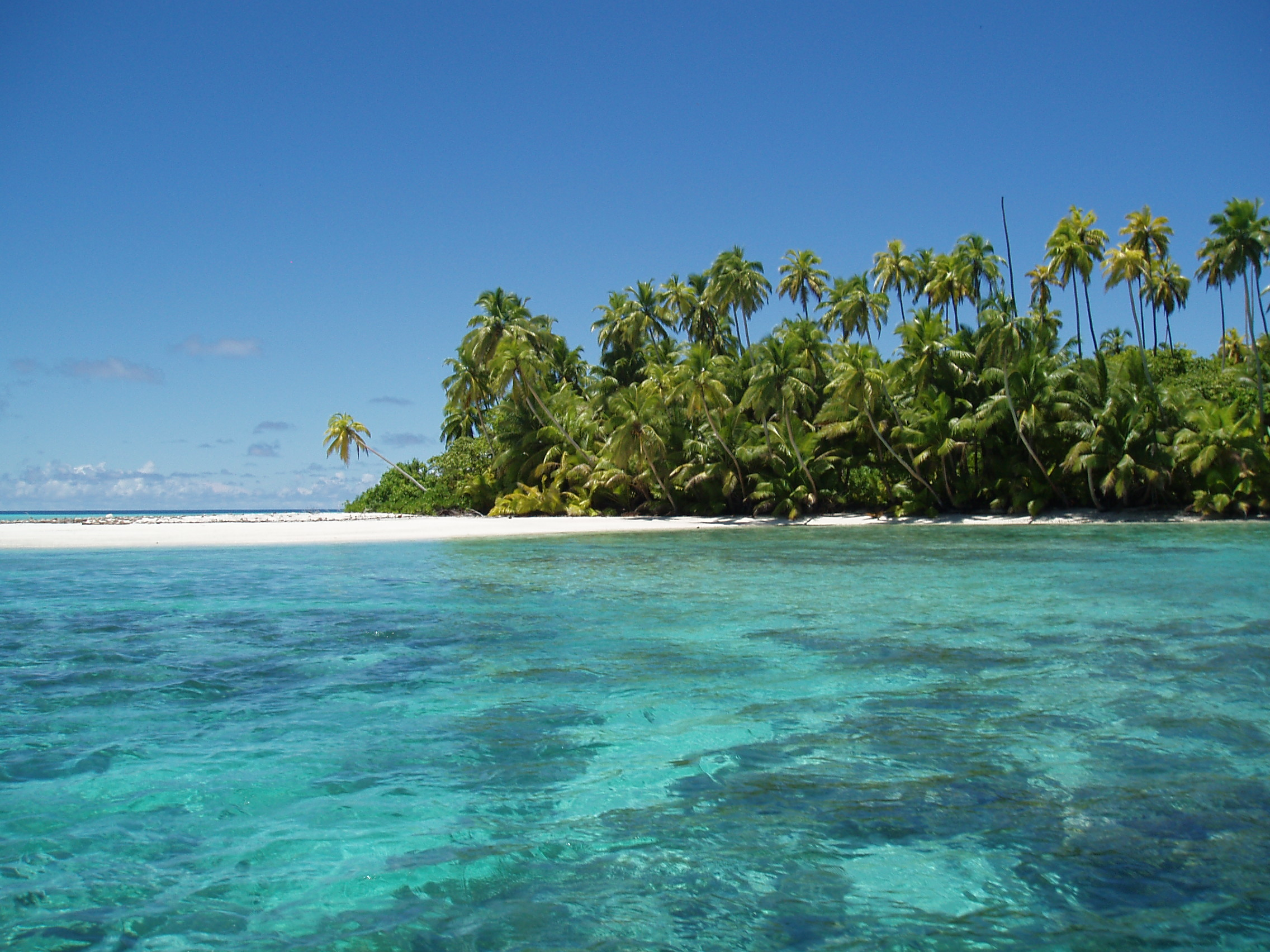
Salomon Atoll

The Salomon Islands or Salomon Atoll is a small atoll of the Chagos Archipelago in the Indian Ocean.

== Description ==
The atoll is located in the northeast of the Chagos Archipelago, between Blenheim Reef and Peros Banhos. The main islands in the group are Île Boddam, with the former main settlement, and a land area of 1.08 km^{2} (0.42 mi^{2}), and Île Anglaise (0.82 km^{2}, 0.32 mi^{2}), both on the western rim of the reef. There were smaller settlements of Chagossians in Fouquet (0.45 km^{2}, 0.17 mi^{2}) and Takamaka (0.48 km^{2}, 0.19 mi^{2}) Islands. Île de la Passe is 0.28 km^{2} (0.11 mi^{2}) in area, and Île Mapou 0.04 km^{2} (0.02 mi^{2}). The remaining islets are much smaller. The total land area is 3.56 km^{2} (1.37 mi^{2}).

There is a passage into the lagoon, named Baie de Salomon, on the Northern side, between Île Anglaise and Île de la Passe. The Salomon Islands are one of the favorite anchoring spots for itinerant yachtsmen passing through the Chagos, even though there are no proper moorings for yachts and a permit of the BIOT authorities is needed. Now uninhabited, the islands are overrun by low jungle between the coconut trees, and it is hard to find the traces of the former settlements.

== History ==
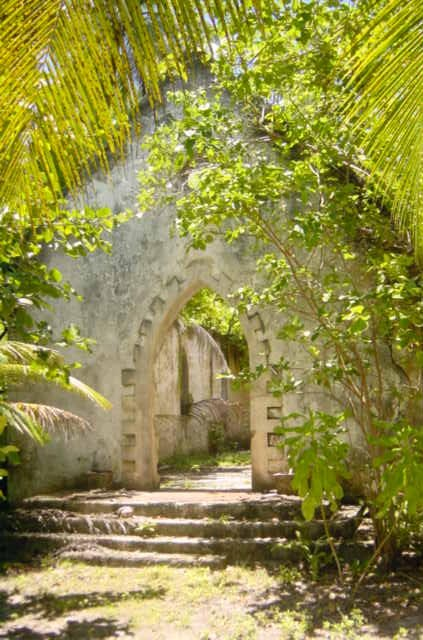
Abandoned church on Boddam Island, Salomon Atoll

This atoll was settled in the last half of the 18th century by coconut plantation workers from Isle de France (now Mauritius). Little is known about the condition of the workers, who were mostly of African origin. However, the workers likely lived in conditions close to slavery. The company exploiting the plantation was called the Chagos Agalega Company.

The Salomon Islands were surveyed in 1837 by Commander Robert Moresby of the Indian Navy on HMS Benares. Moresby's survey produced the first detailed map of this atoll. The atoll was surveyed again in 1905 by Commander B.T. Sommerville on HMS Sealark, who drew a more accurate map. Some of the Salomon Islands were inhabited by the Chagossians, but at the time that the British Government decided to empty the Chagos of local inhabitants, only Île Boddam was inhabited.

Between 1967 and 1973, 500 inhabitants of the Salomon Islands were evicted by the British and their pets were killed in gas chambers by Sir Bruce Greatbatch in order to make way for an American military base. The evictees were resettled in Mauritius and Seychelles. Île Boddam had a jetty, shops, offices, a school, a church and a villa where the plantation manager lived. All these buildings are now hidden by thick jungle. There are wells on Boddam and Takamaka islands which are still used by yachtsmen to replenish their supplies.

== Islets ==
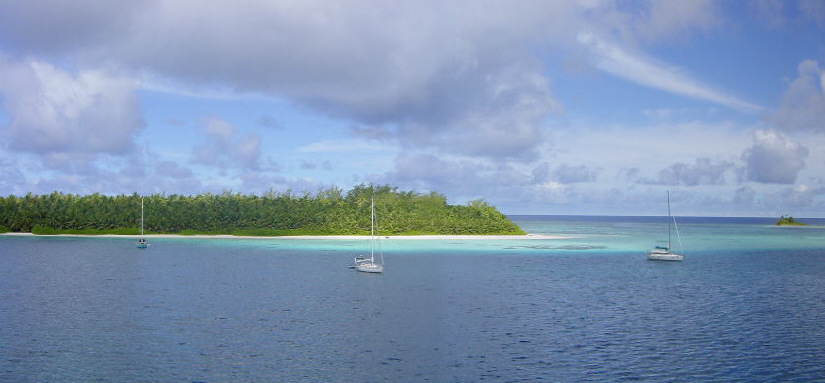
Boddam Island and small Ile Diable to the right

The individual islets of the atoll are, starting in the North, clockwise:

1. Île de la Passe
2. Île Mapou
3. Île Takamaka
4. Île Fouquet
5. Île Sepulture
6. Île Jacobin
7. Île du Sel
8. Île Poule
9. Île Boddam
10. Île Diable
11. Île Anglaise
