= Blenheim Reef =

Partly submerged atoll structure in the Chagos Archipelago, Indian Ocean

Coordinates: 5°12′S 72°28′E

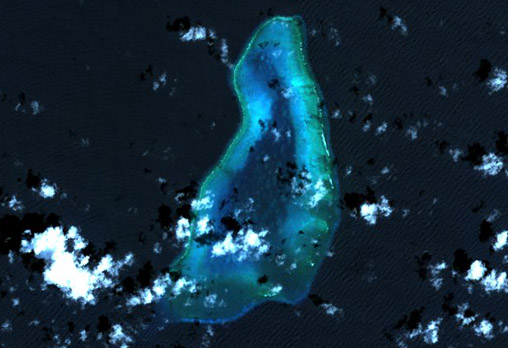
Blenheim Reef. Landsat picture

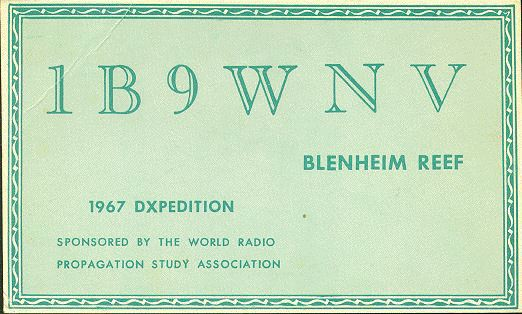
Amateur radio QSL card from Blenheim Reef

Location of Blenheim Reef in the Indian Ocean

Blenheim Reef is a partly submerged atoll structure in the Chagos Archipelago, Indian Ocean. It includes the coral reef of Baxio Predassa in its southeastern rim, plus another completely submerged part. It is located in the northeastern part of the Chagos Archipelago. It measures almost eleven kilometres (north–south) by more than four kilometres (east–west), with a total area of 36.8 square kilometres, including the lagoon of 8.5 km^{2}, the difference being accounted for the mostly by the reef flat. Only on the eastern side, there are a few sand cays above the water. The largest of them is East Island, which is not quite 200 metres long and 70 metres wide. The other islands in the group are North, Middle and South. Only a few grasses grow on the island. The lagoon is up to 18 metres deep and encumbered with rock. The fringing coral reef has a wide passage in the southwest. The closest land is Takamaka Island in the Salomon Islands Atoll, about 20 kilometres to the southwest.

== History ==
The atoll is thought to have been discovered around 1570 by Portuguese sailors, which is why it is also known under its Portuguese name Baxio Predassa (a corruption of Baixo Predassa). The present name comes from the ship Blenheim which discovered the reef on 5 May 1836 during a voyage from London to Bombay (see letter from James Temple Brown to the Nautical Magazine and Naval Chronicle for 1837).

From 1845 to 1860, guano and phosphate were mined. This venture was then given up due to inadequate transport facilities. Around 1880, the Indian Ocean Fruit Company attempted to plant palm trees on the island, but all seedlings were washed into the sea during a storm.

On 29 June 1975, the atoll was incorporated into the Chagos Archipelago and claimed by Mauritius. Before that day, it was not claimed by any nation.

On 15 March 1982, the senior British military representative in Diego Garcia landed on Blenheim Reef and raised the British flag, contrary to Foreign Office instructions which the British Foreign Secretary, Lord Carrington, reaffirmed within hours. The Foreign Office opinion was that the reef was not British territory and could never be, but wanted no publicity which might suggest the idea to other countries. The flag was allowed to deteriorate.

In February 2022, Mauritius made a fifteen day expedition to survey the legally unclaimed reef, to discover if it is exposed at high tide so that it is claimable.

In total, there have been 57 shipwrecks around Blenheim Reef, with an estimated 200 lost lives.

== Islands ==
Baxio Predassa is the name given to the islands that emerge from the eastern rim of the reef. When first surveyed by Robert Moresby, there were many more islands in Baxio Predassa. These have, however, been eroded or submerged and only four islets remain. The group today consists of:

- Ile du Nord, the northernmost island
- Ile du Milieu, surrounded by a reef
- Ile de l'Est, the largest island and the easternmost island in the atoll. The island has only grasses growing on it, though there was once an unsuccessful attempt to plant palms on the island.
- Ile du Sud, the smallest and southernmost islet. It has no vegetation.
