= Richard Edis =

British diplomat

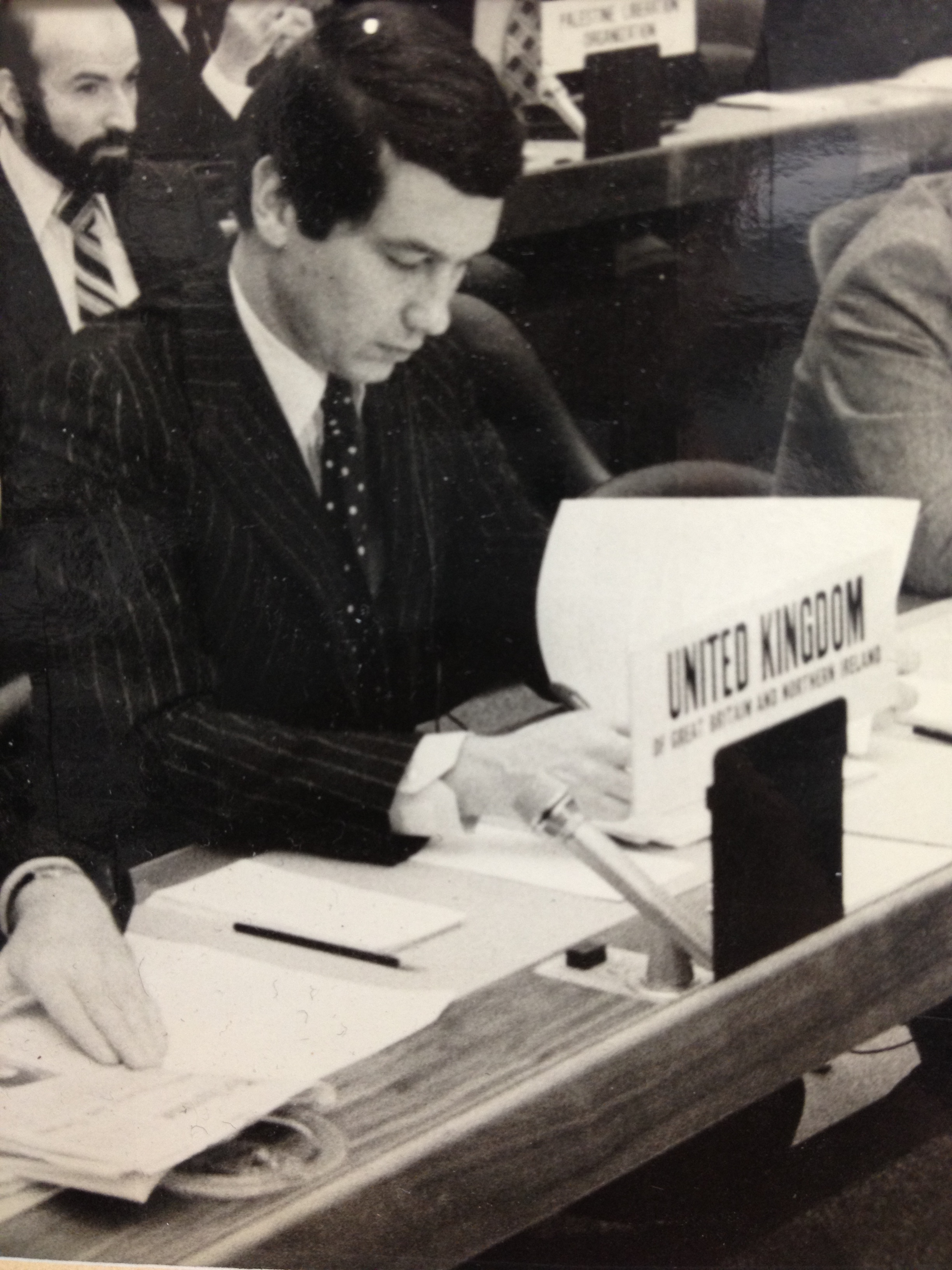

Richard John Smale Edis (1 September 1943 – 10 April 2002) was a British diplomat who served as UK High Commissioner to Mozambique, and UK ambassador to Tunisia, and Algeria.

== Biography ==
Richard Edis was born on 1 September 1943 at Welwyn Garden City to Denis Edis and Sylvia (née Smale), was educated at King Edward's School, Birmingham, and read history at St Catharine's College, Cambridge.

Edis joined the Foreign Office and Her Majesty's Diplomatic Service in 1966, serving in Nairobi; and in New York City and Geneva at the United Nations.

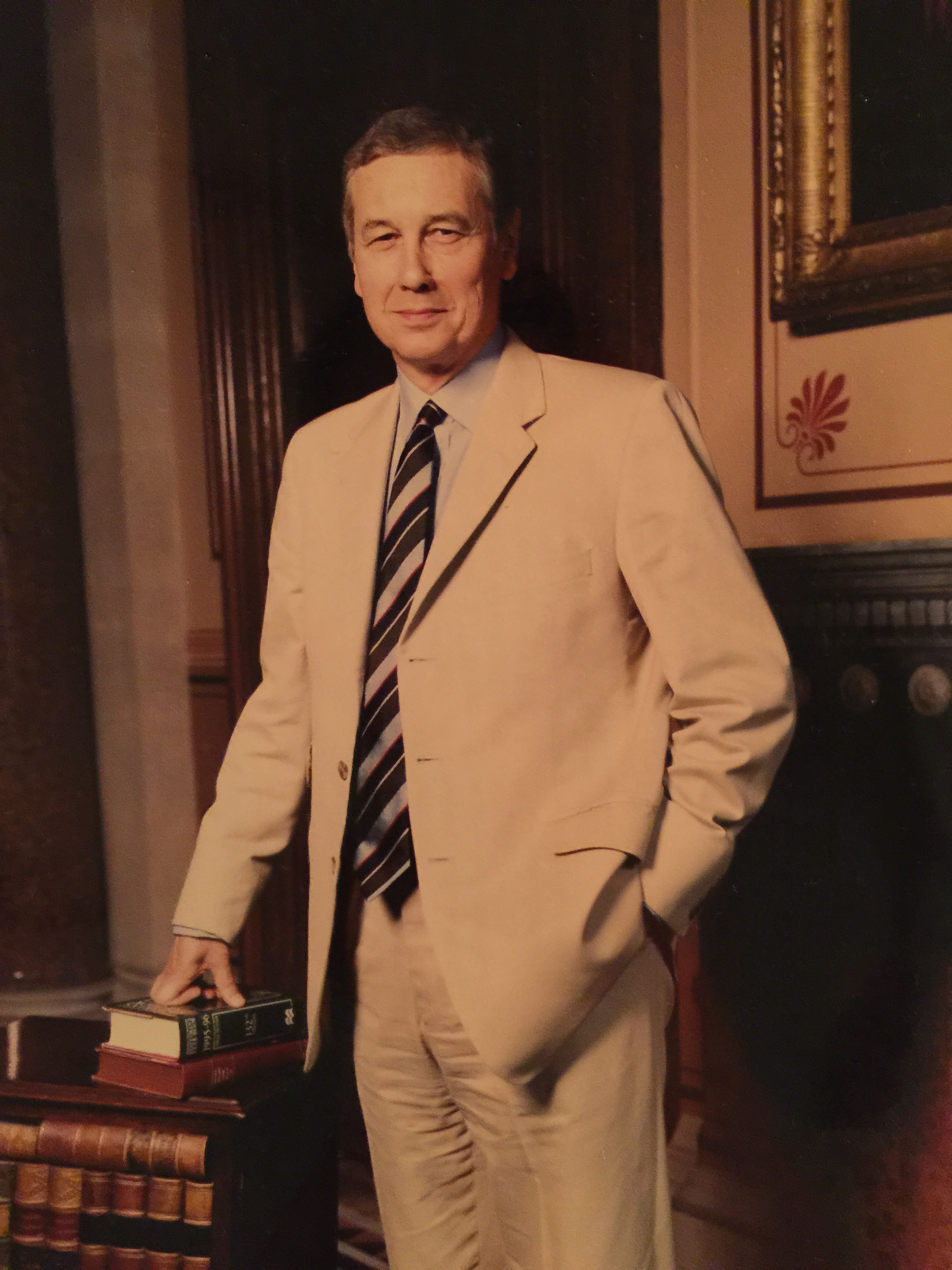
Ambassador Richard Edis

He was appointed UK High Commissioner to Mozambique in 1992, at the time of the Rome General Peace Accords signed between the government of Mozambique and RENAMO, ending the 16-year long Mozambican Civil War; he is credited with helping - with other foreign missions - to keep the fragile peace, notably by his relationship with RENAMO leader Afonso Dhlakama. Multi-party elections held in 1994 ushered in a democratic period for the country; Edis played a key role by dissuading RENAMO and other opposition parties - aggrieved by electoral-technical issues - from declaring a boycott on the night before the poll. In 1995, Mozambique joined the Commonwealth of Nations. Edis was next posted as UK ambassador to Tunisia in 1995 through to 1999. His last posting was as UK ambassador to Algeria from 2001 to 2002.

Edis married Genevieve Cerisoles in 1971; the couple had three sons. He served, with his wife, as Special Constables with the Metropolitan Police during his UK postings.

He was made Companion of the Order of St Michael and St George in 1994.

He died on 10 April 2002. His sons Rupert and Jamyn established The Richard Edis Travel Award Fund at St Catharine's College, providing one or two students each year with substantial financial help to travel during vacations. Rupert Edis notes his belief that the great efforts his father made in Mozambique contributed to his early death.
