= Auguste Toussaint =

Auguste Toussaint (1911–1987) was the Archivist in Chief of Mauritius and a historian of his island, the Mascarene Islands, and the Indian Ocean.

== Bibliography ==
In French

- 1992 - L'océan Indien au XVIIIe, éd. Flammarion,
- 1980 - Histoire de l'océan Indien, collection Que sais-je?, éd. PUF
- 1979 - Les Frères Surcouf, éd. Flammarion, Paris
- 1978 - Histoire des corsaires, collection Que sais-je ?, éd. PUF
- 1974 - L'Océan Indien au XVIIIe, éd. Flammarion, Paris.
- 1971 - Histoire de l'île Maurice, éd. PUF
- 1967 - La Route des îles : Contribution à l'histoire maritime des Mascareignes, éd. S.E.V.P.E.N.
- 1966 - Une Cité tropicale, Port-Louis de l'Ile Maurice, éd. PUF Vendôme

In English

- 1954 - Bibliography of Mauritius (1502-1954) avec H. Adolphe, Esclapon Limited, Port Louis
