= Chagos Archipelago sovereignty dispute =

Dispute between Mauritius and the United Kingdom

The Republic of Mauritius

The Chagos Archipelago sovereignty dispute is a dispute between Mauritius and the United Kingdom over sovereignty of the Chagos Archipelago, a group of coral atolls in the central Indian Ocean that the United Kingdom has administered as the British Indian Ocean Territory (BIOT) since 1965. The archipelago's largest island, Diego Garcia, is the site of a joint British and American military base. Mauritius claims the archipelago as part of its territory, from which it says the United Kingdom unlawfully detached it before Mauritian independence; for decades the United Kingdom maintained that the territory was British and would be ceded to Mauritius only when it was no longer needed for defence purposes.

The archipelago had been administered as a dependency of Mauritius since it was ceded to Britain in 1814. In September 1965, during the negotiations on Mauritian independence, the Mauritian ministers agreed in principle to its detachment in return for £3 million and a set of undertakings, including its return when it was no longer needed for defence, and on 8 November 1965 the United Kingdom created the BIOT by Order in Council. Whether that consent was freely given is disputed: the British Prime Minister had told the Mauritian Premier, Seewoosagur Ramgoolam, that he and his colleagues could return home "either with Independence or without it". The following month the UN General Assembly invited the United Kingdom, in resolution 2066 (XX), "to take no action which would dismember the Territory of Mauritius and violate its territorial integrity". Under a 1966 agreement with the United States, the United Kingdom bought the plantations and, between 1967 and 1973, prevented islanders who had left from returning and removed those who remained to Mauritius and Seychelles, displacing a population estimated at 1,500 to 1,750 people. It paid Mauritius £650,000 towards their resettlement in 1972 and a further £4 million ex gratia under a 1982 agreement, and in 2018 acknowledged that the manner of their removal and their treatment afterwards "was shameful and wrong".

Mauritius began to press its claim in 1980, supported by the Organisation of African Unity and later the African Union, and by the Non-Aligned Movement. In 2015 an arbitral tribunal under the United Nations Convention on the Law of the Sea held that it had no jurisdiction over sovereignty, but that the 1965 undertakings were legally binding and that the marine protected area declared by the United Kingdom in 2010 breached the convention. At the General Assembly's request, the International Court of Justice advised in February 2019, by 13 votes to 1, that the detachment "was not based on the free and genuine expression of the will of the people concerned", that the decolonisation of Mauritius had therefore not been lawfully completed, and that the United Kingdom was under an obligation to end its administration of the archipelago "as rapidly as possible". In resolution 73/295, adopted by 116 votes to 6, the General Assembly demanded that the United Kingdom withdraw its administration within six months; the United Kingdom, which regarded the opinion as not legally binding, did not do so. In 2021 a special chamber of the International Tribunal for the Law of the Sea, relying on the opinion, held that Mauritius could be regarded as the coastal state of the archipelago for the purpose of delimiting its maritime boundary with the Maldives.

The two governments began negotiations in November 2022, and on 22 May 2025 their prime ministers signed the Agreement concerning the Chagos Archipelago including Diego Garcia, under which Mauritius is sovereign over the whole archipelago and authorises the United Kingdom to exercise its sovereign rights over Diego Garcia for an initial 99 years, in return for annual payments. The agreement was welcomed by the United States, India and the African Union and supported by the Chagos Refugees Group, but opposed by the Conservatives and Reform UK and by some Chagossians, mainly in the United Kingdom, who demanded a say in the islands' future; in February 2026 a group of them landed on Île du Coin in Peros Banhos. Ratification stalled in 2026 after the British government said that a change in the American president's position had made it impossible to agree an update to the 1966 UK–US agreement, and the implementing bill lapsed in April; as of November 2026 the treaty had not entered into force, and the British government, which said that it could not obtain American consent for the existing arrangements, was seeking to "recast" them.

== History ==
=== Early history and French settlement ===
The Chagos Archipelago. Diego Garcia, Peros Banhos and the Salomon Islands were the atolls still inhabited in the 1960s.

The Chagos Archipelago is a group of coral atolls in the central Indian Ocean, about 2,200 kilometres (1,400 mi) north-east of the island of Mauritius; its largest island, Diego Garcia, makes up more than half of its land area. Portuguese navigators named the islands in the sixteenth century, and they appear on Portuguese charts from 1538, but they remained uninhabited for more than two centuries, visited only by passing ships. Mauritius itself was occupied by the Dutch from 1638 to 1710, and in 1715 France took possession of it and named it Île de France.

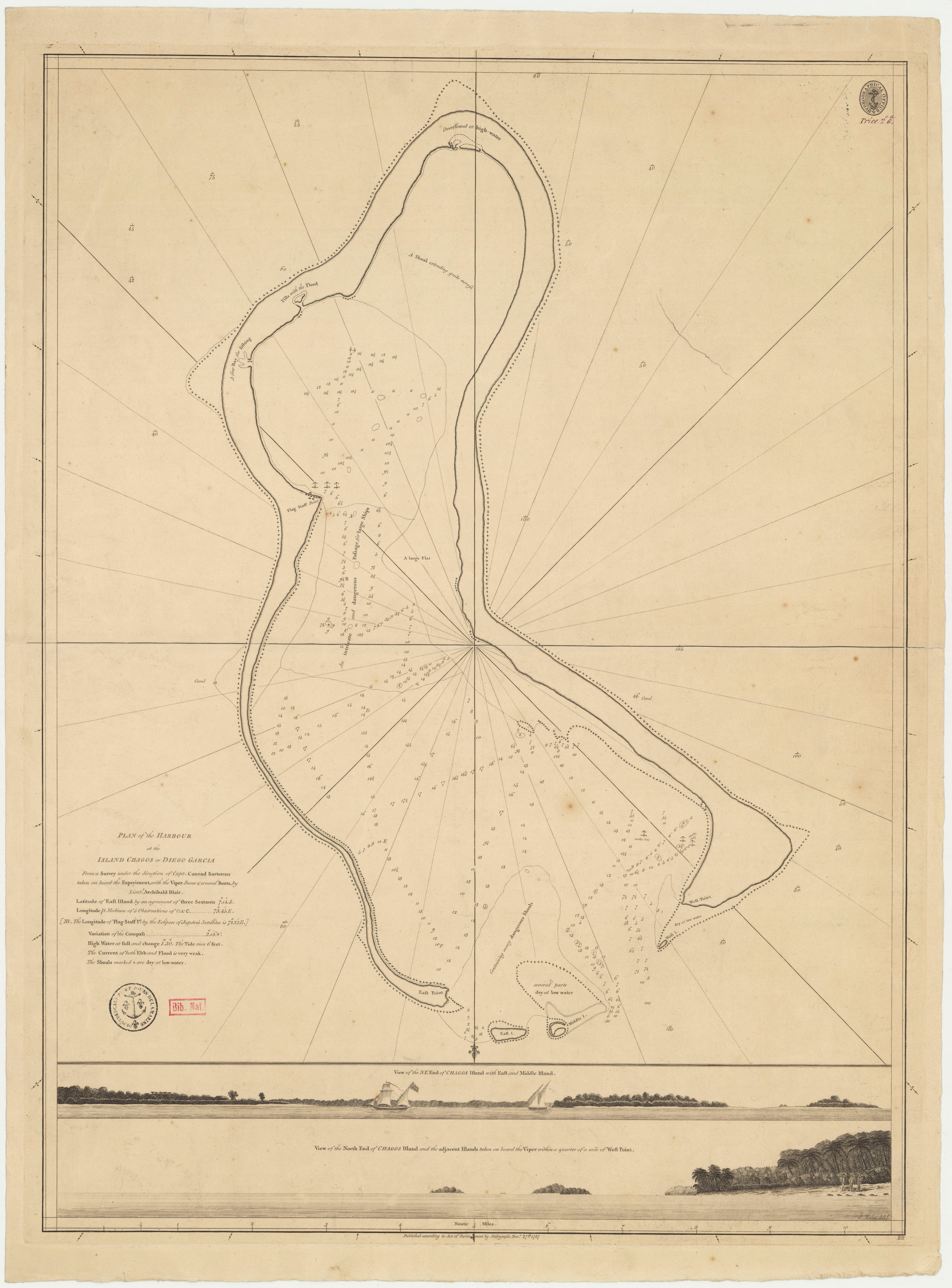
Chart of Diego Garcia from a survey by Lieutenant Archibald Blair, published in 1787

As Anglo-French rivalry spread to the Indian Ocean, France claimed Peros Banhos in 1744 and Diego Garcia in 1769. Permanent settlement followed concessions granted by the colonial government of Île de France: from 1783 the planter Pierre Marie Le Normand settled Diego Garcia with some 22 enslaved Africans, who according to the anthropologist David Vine were probably the archipelago's first permanent inhabitants. A party from the East India Company that landed on Diego Garcia in 1786 and claimed it for Britain was withdrawn after the French governor protested. Hundreds more enslaved people, brought mainly from Madagascar and Mozambique, were put to work on coconut plantations and fishing settlements owned by planters living in Mauritius. Copra and coconut oil became the islands' main products, earning them the name of the "Oil Islands", and France administered the archipelago, like Seychelles, as a dependency of Île de France.

=== British dependency of Mauritius (1814–1965) ===
British forces captured Île de France in 1810, during the Napoleonic Wars, and renamed it Mauritius; its capitulation covered its dependencies, including the Chagos Islands, and by the Treaty of Paris of 30 May 1814 France ceded the colony and all its dependencies to the United Kingdom. From then until 1965 the archipelago was administered as a dependency of Mauritius: Governor Sir Lowry Cole listed its islands among the dependencies in 1826, and ordinances of 1852 and 1872 treated them in the same way.

Admiralty chart of the Chagos Archipelago from the 1837 survey by Commander Robert Moresby and Lieutenant F. T. Powell (published 1839, corrected to 1906)

When slavery was abolished in the 1830s, some 60,000 enslaved people in Mauritius, including those in the archipelago, were freed; many stayed on the plantations, where they were later joined by Indian indentured labourers and by workers recruited in Mauritius. Day-to-day authority lay with the plantation managers, whom the government in Mauritius appointed as peace officers and as civil status officers. Special Commissioners from Mauritius toured the islands in 1859–1860, and from 1875 a magistrate based in Port Louis made regular visits to administer justice and report on conditions, although the High Court in London later observed that the magistrate was "at best an annual visitor".

The plantations, at first held as concessions, became private freeholds in the 1860s; the Société Huilière de Diégo et Péros, formed in 1883 by merging three plantations on Diego Garcia, operated in the archipelago until 1962, when the Chagos Agalega Company acquired most of the freeholds. By about 1900 the population was close to 1,000, and a distinct creole-speaking society had formed whose island-born members became known as the Ilois. When Seychelles, previously a dependency of Mauritius, became a separate colony in 1903, the archipelago remained with Agaléga and St. Brandon among the "Lesser Dependencies" of Mauritius. In the twentieth century the Mauritian government subsidised a regular steamship service, begun in 1935, and sent health, agricultural and labour officials to the islands. During the Second World War two six-inch guns were installed at Cannon Point on Diego Garcia in 1942. Diego Garcia's population fell by half between 1952 and 1962 as people left for Mauritius, and labourers were increasingly recruited from Seychelles; by the 1960s the inhabitants comprised contract workers from Mauritius and Seychelles and the Ilois, whose families had lived in the islands for one or more generations.

Reports of the UN General Assembly's Fourth Committee described the islands as dependencies of Mauritius, and the 1964 constitution defined the colony as "the island of Mauritius and the Dependencies of Mauritius". A Colonial Office legal note of April 1965 stated: "There can be no legal doubts about the position over the Lesser Dependencies of Mauritius, which include the Chagos Archipelago." The two governments draw different conclusions from this history. Mauritius has described "close economic, cultural and social links" and an administration of the archipelago "as a constituent part of Mauritius". The United Kingdom has said that the islands were attached to Mauritius "purely as a matter of convenience", were "very loosely administered" from it and had no economic relevance to it beyond the supply of coconut products, and that such ties do not affect their legal status.

=== Detachment of the Chagos Archipelago (1965) ===
==== Anglo-American planning ====
The United States Navy had long sought a logistics capability in the Indian Ocean; its "Strategic Island Concept", approved by the Joint Chiefs of Staff in 1960, called in essence for "a stockpiling of islands for contingency use". At talks in February 1964 the United States expressed interest in a military communications facility on Diego Garcia, and British officials agreed to recommend that the United Kingdom acquire the land, resettle the population and pay compensation, while the United States met the costs of construction and maintenance. According to a British chronology, the United Kingdom was to "provide the land, and security of tenure, by detaching islands and placing them under direct U.K. administration". The Americans did not want their facilities to depend on the goodwill of newly independent states, and in January 1965, after a joint survey, they made clear that in their view detachment should "include the entire Chagos archipelago, primarily in the interest of security". A US Navy paper later explained that the islands had been chosen for their "unquestioned UK sovereignty and a negligible native population". A British memorandum of April 1964 recommended detachment by Order in Council before Mauritian independence. It noted that the United Kingdom had "the constitutional power to take action without the consent of the Mauritius Government", but that doing so "would expose us to criticism in Parliament and the United Nations"; it was therefore "desirable to secure their positive consent, or failing that, at least their acquiescence".

==== Lancaster House and the Mauritian ministers' consent ====
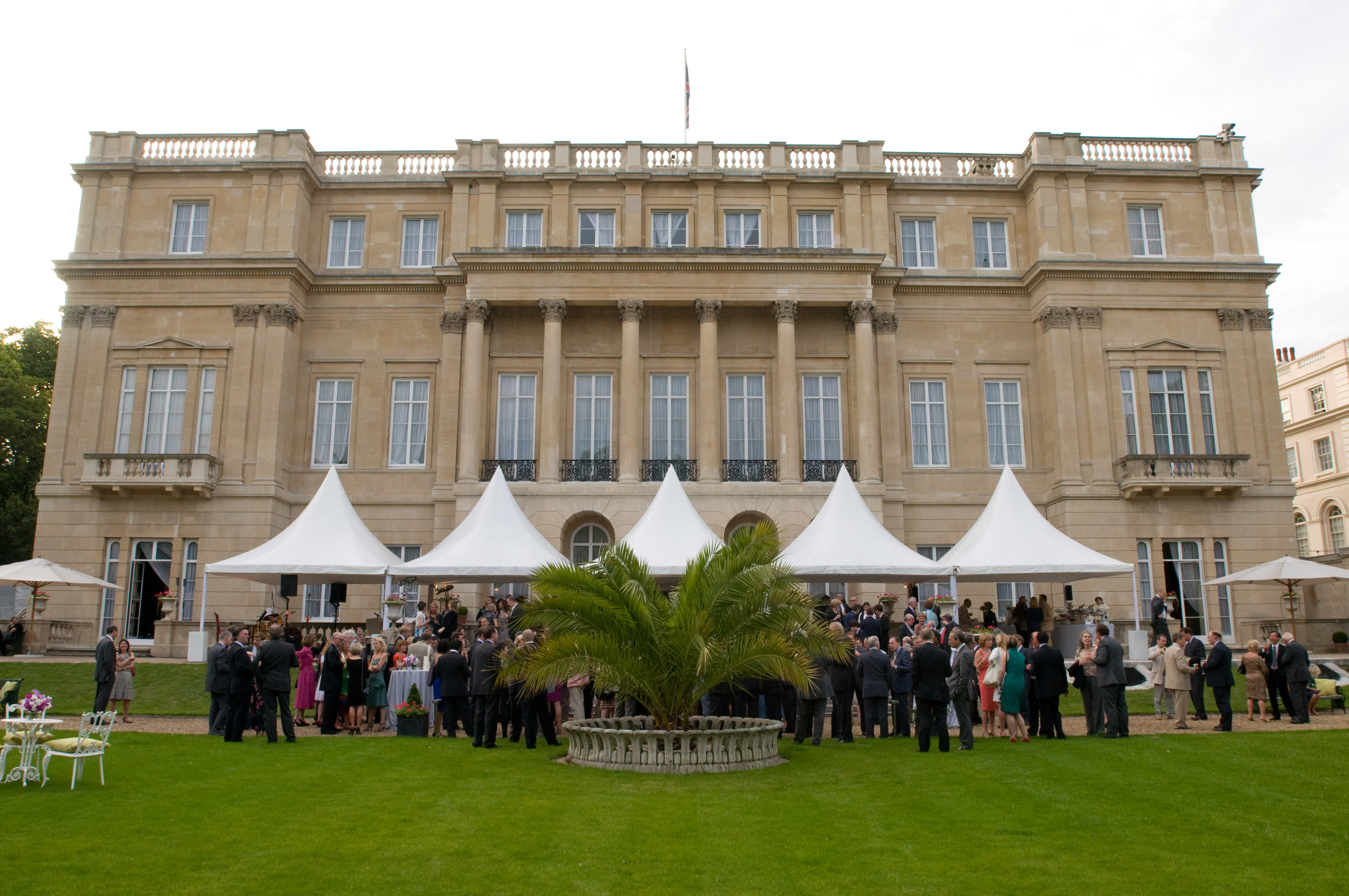
Lancaster House, London, where Ramgoolam and two other Mauritian ministers agreed in principle to the detachment on 23 September 1965

The Premier of Mauritius, Seewoosagur Ramgoolam, was first approached in June 1964 and preferred a long-term lease to detachment. In July 1965 the Colonial Office, which regarded the Mauritian government's agreement as "essential", told the Governor to put the proposal to the Council of Ministers and "gauge what it might be necessary to offer to secure willing and public acquiescence". The ministers said that detachment would be "unacceptable to public opinion in Mauritius" and asked for a lease with safeguards for mineral rights and a preference for Mauritius in any grant of fishing rights, but were told that the United States would not accept a lease. A British ministerial memorandum of August 1965 proposed that, if they refused the terms offered, they should be told that the government would "consider any proposals for the future status of Mauritius without the Chagos Archipelago" and would transfer the islands to British sovereignty by Order in Council. When ministers discussed it on 31 August, the Deputy Secretary of State for Defence said that the Mauritian ministers' agreement "should be obtained if possible but in any event the decision to detach the islands should be taken before the end of the Mauritius Constitutional Conference".

The matter was pursued in private meetings during the constitutional conference on Mauritian independence held in London in September 1965. Ramgoolam argued for a lease, or for independence first and negotiations over Diego Garcia afterwards; the British side insisted on detachment, but raised its offer of compensation from £1 million to £3 million and offered the prospect of the islands' return when no longer needed for defence. Before Ramgoolam met the Prime Minister, Harold Wilson, on 23 September, Wilson's private secretary wrote that the object was "to frighten him with hope: hope that he might get independence; Fright lest he might not unless he is sensible about the detachment of the Chagos Archipelago". The Colonial Office brief for the meeting stated that "in the last resort, however, detachment could be carried out without Mauritius consent". According to the British record, Wilson told Ramgoolam that he and his colleagues "could return to Mauritius either with Independence or without it", and that Diego Garcia could be detached "by order in Council or with the agreement of the Premier and his colleagues". That afternoon at Lancaster House the Colonial Secretary, Anthony Greenwood, told the Mauritian ministers that other British ministers were aware "that it would be possible for the British Government to detach them from Mauritius by Order in Council", and refused Ramgoolam's renewed request for a lease. Ramgoolam and two other ministers, Sookdeo Bissoondoyal and Abdool Razack Mohamed, then agreed in principle to detachment in return for undertakings, completed at Ramgoolam's request, that became known as the Lancaster House undertakings:

1. negotiations for a defence agreement between Britain and Mauritius;
2. consultation after independence if a difficult internal security situation arose in Mauritius;
3. compensation of up to £3 million, in addition to direct compensation to landowners and the cost of resettling others affected;
4. British support for Mauritian requests to the United States for concessions on sugar imports and the supply of wheat and other commodities;
5. British efforts to have the United States use Mauritian labour and materials for construction;
6. British good offices to keep navigational and meteorological facilities, fishing rights and the emergency use of the airstrip available to Mauritius as far as practicable;
7. the return of the islands to Mauritius if the need for the facilities disappeared; and
8. the benefit of any minerals or oil discovered in or near the archipelago to revert to Mauritius.
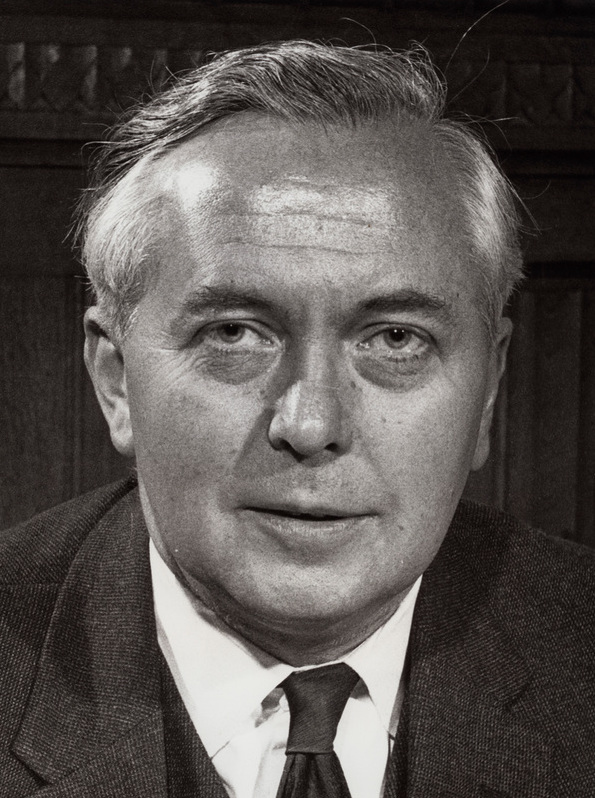
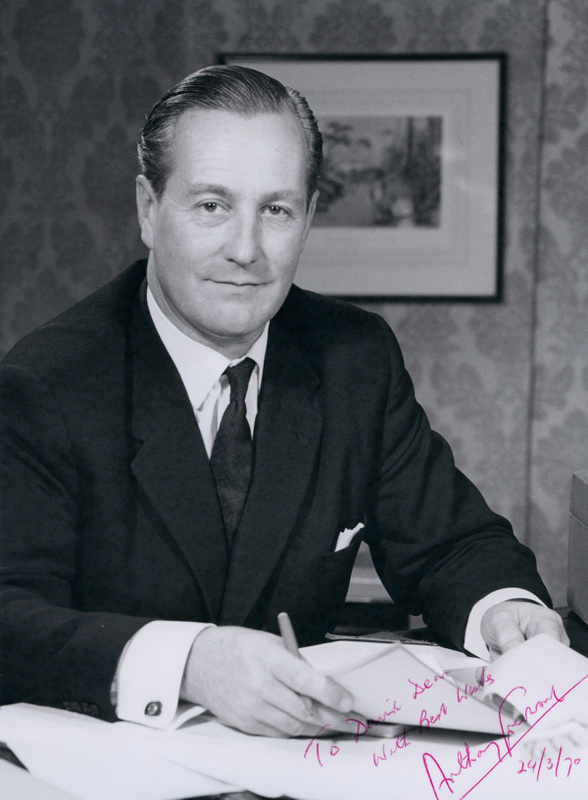
The Prime Minister, Harold Wilson (left), told Ramgoolam on the morning of 23 September 1965 that he and his colleagues "could return to Mauritius either with Independence or without it"; that afternoon Ramgoolam and two other ministers agreed in principle to detachment at a meeting at Lancaster House with the Colonial Secretary, Anthony Greenwood (right).

The next day the British government announced that Mauritius would become independent. On 5 November 1965 the Council of Ministers "confirmed agreement to the detachment of Chagos Archipelago on conditions enumerated", with the ministers of the Parti Mauricien Social Démocrate (PMSD) dissenting. The Colonial Office then made clear that "a decision about the need to retain the islands must rest entirely with the United Kingdom Government".

Whether this consent was freely given is disputed. The same day Greenwood urged Wilson to make the order quickly, because if the matter reached the United Nations first "the Mauritius Government will be under considerable pressure to withdraw their agreement"; it was "therefore important that we should be able to present the U.N. with a fait accompli". In 1967, when it seemed that the secret American contribution to the cost might become public, a draft ministerial minute warned that the government would be accused of having "deliberately deceived the Mauritius Government in order to secure their agreement to the separation from Mauritius of the Chagos Archipelago at a low level of compensation". Mauritius argues that "the choice that was given to the Mauritian Ministers was, in fact, no choice at all". The United Kingdom calls the agreement "a freely negotiated package", reached after it had publicly committed itself to Mauritian independence, and has called the portrayal of detachment as a condition of independence "a wholly inaccurate portrayal, invented by Mauritius many years after the relevant events". In 2015 the majority of an arbitral tribunal held that it had no jurisdiction to decide whether the consent was valid, while two dissenting arbitrators found that it had been given under duress; in 2019 the International Court of Justice concluded that the detachment "was not based on the free and genuine expression of the will of the people concerned" (see § Arbitration under the Law of the Sea Convention (2010–2015) and § Legal basis of the findings).

==== Creation of the British Indian Ocean Territory ====
On 8 November 1965 the British Indian Ocean Territory Order created the British Indian Ocean Territory (BIOT) from the Chagos Archipelago and the islands of Aldabra, Farquhar and Desroches, detached from Seychelles. When it announced the territory in the General Assembly's Fourth Committee on 16 November 1965, the United Kingdom described it as "an administrative re-adjustment, freely worked out with the Government and elected representatives of the people concerned". The three Seychelles islands were returned in 1976 (see § Return of the Seychelles islands (1976)).

On 16 December 1965 the General Assembly adopted resolution 2066 (XX), which noted "with deep concern" that any step to detach islands from Mauritius to establish a military base would contravene the Declaration on the Granting of Independence to Colonial Countries and Peoples, and invited the United Kingdom "to take no action which would dismember the Territory of Mauritius and violate its territorial integrity"; it was adopted by 89 votes to none, with the United Kingdom among the 18 abstentions. Resolutions 2232 (XXI) of 1966 and 2357 (XXII) of 1967 reiterated that disrupting the territorial integrity of colonial territories and "the establishment of military bases and installations in these Territories" were incompatible with the UN Charter; the United Kingdom and the United States voted against that paragraph both times.

=== Anglo-American defence agreements ===
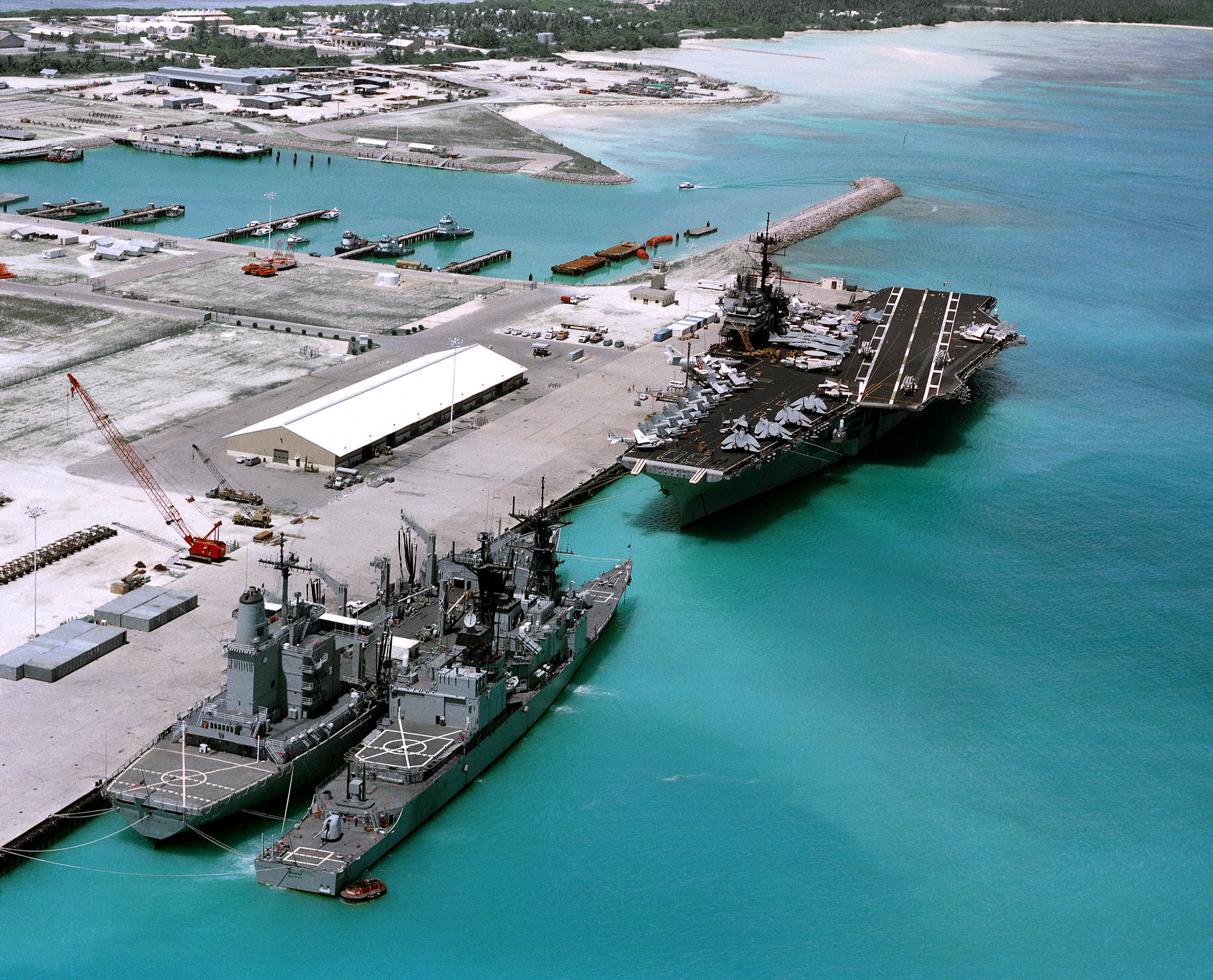
The aircraft carrier USS Saratoga with other US Navy ships at Diego Garcia in December 1985, the first visit of an aircraft carrier to the island

Under notes exchanged by the British and American governments on 30 December 1966, to which Mauritius was not a party, the territory was to "remain under United Kingdom sovereignty" but be available for the defence needs of both governments, with sites provided to the United States "without charge". The agreement was to last 50 years and then a further 20 unless either side gave notice; in 2016 it was left to continue until 30 December 2036. A confidential Agreed Minute listed "resettling any inhabitants" among the British "administrative measures"; it remained secret until it was revealed in the first Bancoult case. Under a further secret arrangement the United States paid towards the cost of setting up the territory by waiving British payments for the Polaris missile programme: £5 million according to the arbitral tribunal in 2015, and "one-half of the detachment costs ($14 M)" according to a US Navy paper of 1970. Notes of 24 October 1972 approved "a limited naval communications facility on Diego Garcia", which the Diego Garcia Agreement 1976 allowed to be developed into "a support facility of the United States Navy"; apart from the movements of ships and aircraft in normal circumstances, "the use of the facility shall be a matter for the joint decision of the two Governments".

=== Independence of Mauritius (1968) ===
After parties favouring independence won the general election of 7 August 1967, the new Legislative Assembly asked the British government to implement the 1965 decisions, and Mauritius became independent on 12 March 1968 with Ramgoolam as Prime Minister. Its constitution defined it as "the territories which immediately before 12th March 1968 constituted the colony of Mauritius", a definition that excluded the Chagos Archipelago. Mauritius was admitted to the United Nations by acclamation on 24 April 1968. (Note: The International Court of Justice's 2019 advisory opinion gives the date of admission as 26 April 1968; General Assembly resolution 2371 (XXII), the record of the plenary meeting and the United Kingdom's written statement to the court give 24 April 1968.) The United Kingdom has argued that the detachment was public knowledge and caused no particular controversy during the 1967 election, and that no member state raised the archipelago when Mauritius was admitted. In 2019 the International Court of Justice concluded that, because of the archipelago's unlawful detachment, the decolonisation of Mauritius had not been lawfully completed at independence (see § Advisory opinion (2019)).

=== Expulsion of the Chagossians (1967–1973) ===
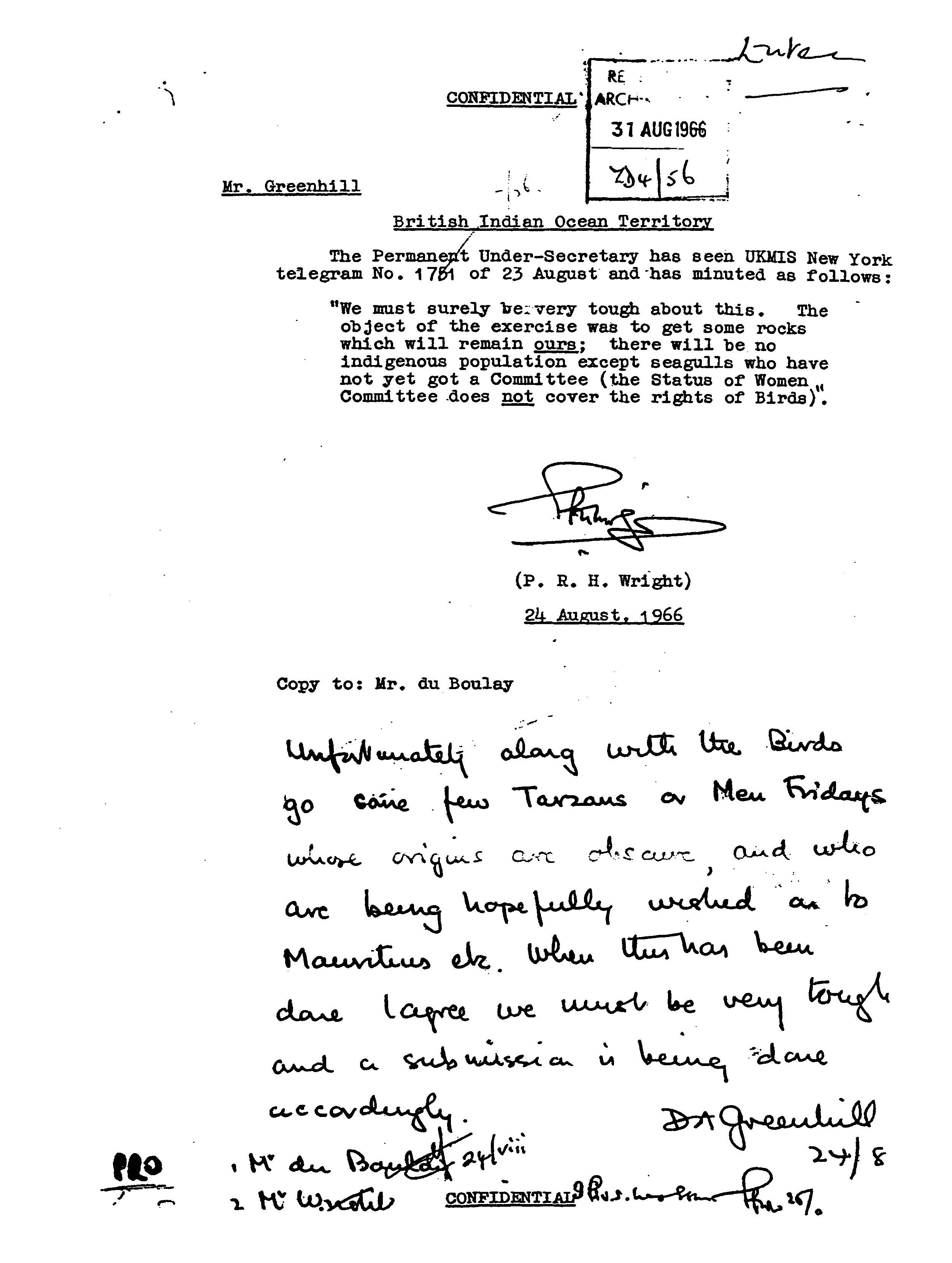
A 1966 comment by the official D. A. Greenhill: "Unfortunately along with the Birds go some few Tarzans or Men Fridays ..."

When the territory was created, about 1,360 people lived in the archipelago; including people born there, the Chagossian population has been put at between 1,500 and 1,750. British officials set out to present the islands as having no permanent population, which would otherwise have brought obligations towards the inhabitants under Chapter XI of the UN Charter. A Foreign Office memorandum of July 1965 stated that none of the inhabitants "should be regarded as being permanent inhabitants of the islands", and in 1970 a Foreign Office legal adviser listed among the purposes of an immigration law "to maintain the fiction that the inhabitants of Chagos are not a permanent or semi-permanent population". In 1969 ministers decided to aim at moving the whole population to Mauritius and Seychelles, and in 1971 the Foreign Office explained that "we do not wish to be accountable to the United Nations for any permanent inhabitants of BIOT", although only Diego Garcia was likely to be needed.

Following the 1966 UK–US agreement, the Crown bought the plantations in 1967, and islanders who went to Mauritius in 1967 and 1968, on leave, at the end of their contracts or for medical treatment, were refused passage home. In January 1971, after the United States had asked for Diego Garcia to be cleared by July, its inhabitants were told that the island would close. The Immigration Ordinance enacted by the BIOT Commissioner on 16 April 1971 made it unlawful to enter or remain in the territory without a permit. Lord Hoffmann later said that there was "no evidence that it had ever been used to expel anyone": those who left did so "because they were left with the alternative of being abandoned without support or supplies". Between July and October 1971 the people of Diego Garcia were shipped on the Nordvaer and the Isle of Farquhar to Peros Banhos and Salomon or to Seychelles and Mauritius, leaving behind most of their possessions; the High Court found no evidence of physical force, but most of their dogs "were rounded up and gassed or burnt", and Ilois travelling by way of Seychelles were lodged in an unused section of the prison on Mahé. As the remaining plantations ran down, the people of Peros Banhos and Salomon were shipped to Mauritius in 1972 and 1973; the last ship left Peros Banhos on 26 May 1973. The ICJ found that the whole population had been "either prevented from returning or forcibly removed and prevented from returning by the United Kingdom".

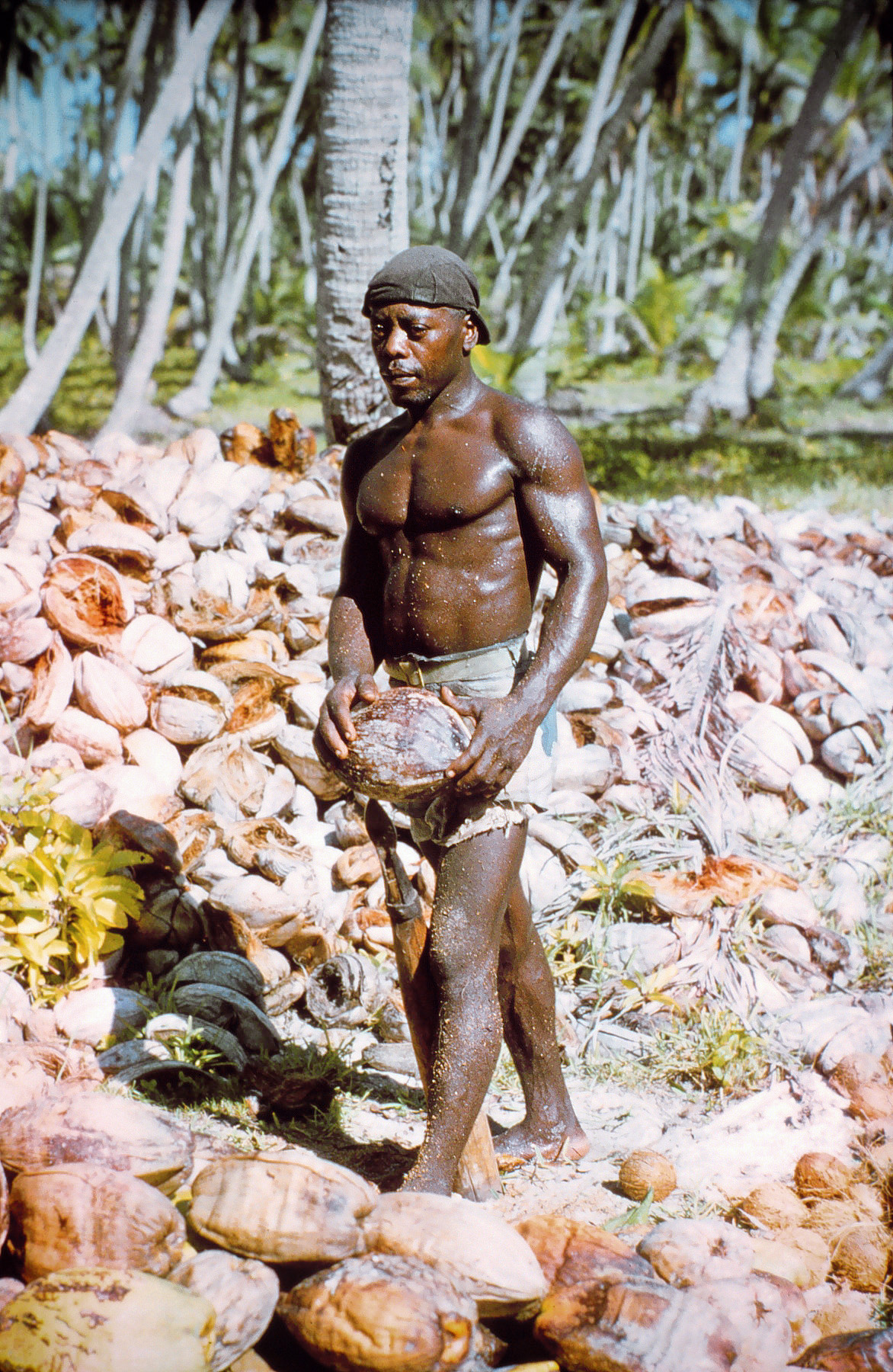
An inhabitant of Diego Garcia in 1971, at the time of the US encampment

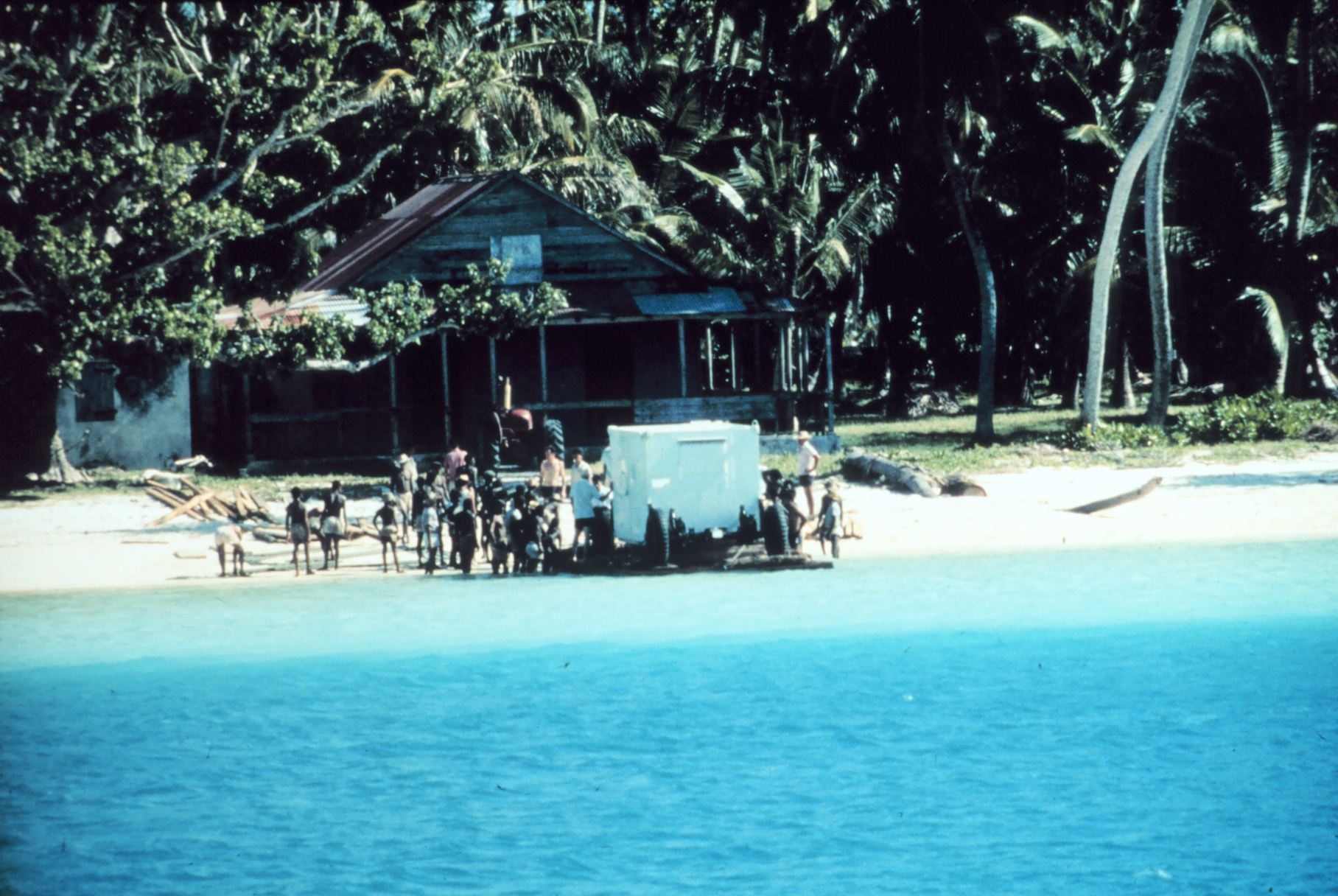
Ilois helping US personnel to bring equipment ashore on Diego Garcia, 1971

No resettlement scheme awaited them in Mauritius, where "extreme poverty routinely marked their lives". In 1972 Mauritius accepted £650,000 "in full and final discharge" of the British undertaking to meet the cost of resettlement; the money was distributed in cash only in 1977 and 1978. A damages claim brought in London in 1975 by a former inhabitant, Michel Vencatessen (Vencatessen v Attorney General), led to a 1982 agreement under which the United Kingdom paid a further £4 million ex gratia, without admitting liability, in full and final settlement of the islanders' claims. The 1,344 recipients had to sign or thumbprint a renunciation form written in English without a Creole translation; only 12 refused. In 2008 the government accepted that the removal had been "accomplished with a callous disregard of their interests", and in 2018 it told the ICJ that it "fully accepts that the manner in which the Chagossians were removed from the Chagos Archipelago, and the way they were treated thereafter, was shameful and wrong".

=== Return of the Seychelles islands (1976) ===
Seychelles was compensated more generously than Mauritius: according to a State Department paper of October 1975, Britain had given it £6.2 million for the three islands, in the form of the construction of the airport on Mahé, against £3 million paid to Mauritius for the whole Chagos Archipelago. As Seychelles approached independence, the British and American governments agreed in 1975–1976 to return the islands. The two governments agreed that there was "no real defence need to keep the three islands", a planned airfield on Aldabra having been dropped for economic and ecological reasons, including the threat to the giant tortoise. British officials argued that the return would "virtually assure the peaceful and orderly transition of Seychelles to independence", and that, the islands being inhabited, "after the outcry over the workers removed from the Chagos Archipelago, it would be extremely difficult politically to do the same thing in the ex-Seychelles islands". The return could also be presented to Mauritius as "an earnest of good intent", and might stop Seychelles and Mauritius "making common cause" against the territory at the Organisation of African Unity and the United Nations. Both governments feared that Mauritius would then press for the Chagos Archipelago, but the British side replied that "essentially Mauritius had no leverage over Chagos". In March 1976 the Foreign Office minister Ted Rowlands assured Mauritius in writing that the Chagos islands would be returned "when they are no longer needed for defence purposes in the same way as the three ex-Seychelles islands are now being returned to Seychelles". Aldabra, Farquhar and Desroches were returned on Seychelles' independence on 29 June 1976, leaving the Chagos Archipelago as the whole of the territory.

=== Mauritius's claim and the British position (1968–2010) ===
Until 1980 Mauritius generally did not raise the archipelago in public forums or diplomatic exchanges. Mauritius attributes this to its economic difficulties and its dependence on the United Kingdom; the United Kingdom says that Mauritius did not then question that the territory had not been part of Mauritius at independence. In Mauritius, Ramgoolam was accused of having given up the islands to obtain independence. A British Cabinet committee paper of about 1967 recorded that when the PMSD left the coalition government over the compensation, he had been accused "of having 'sold out' on Chagos far too cheaply in order to get a decision in favour of independence". In May 1967 a Colonial Office official expected him to be attacked again during the election campaign "for having sold Chagos too cheaply in order to secure the agreement of the British Government that Mauritius should proceed to independence". Giving evidence in Chagos Islanders v Attorney General, the Chagossian leader Olivier Bancoult told the High Court in London that the Chagos Refugees Group had been founded in 1983 "as an Ilois group for Ilois, because they felt betrayed by Mauritian politicians and intellectuals". Ramgoolam himself said in 1974 that Britain had been legally entitled to make the arrangements it saw fit, but in 1979 that "we had no choice".

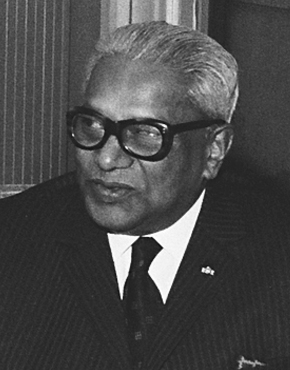
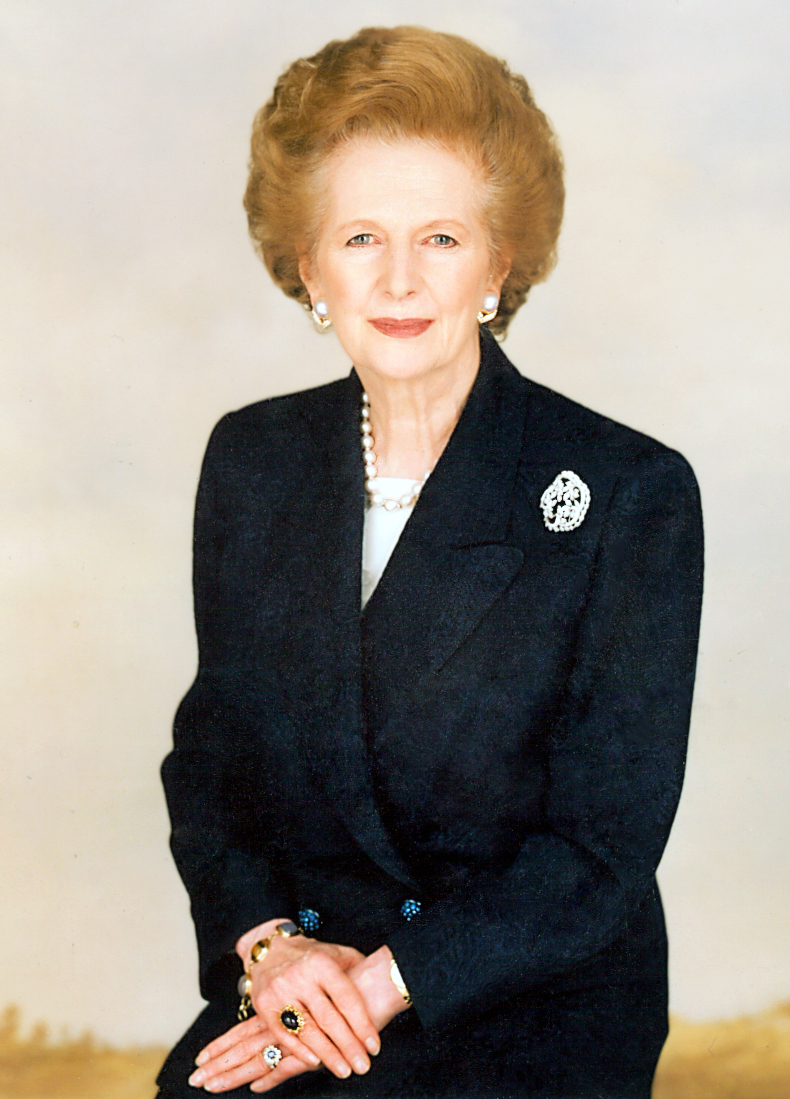
On 9 October 1980 the Prime Minister of Mauritius, Seewoosagur Ramgoolam (left), told the UN General Assembly that the British Indian Ocean Territory should be disbanded and the archipelago restored to Mauritius; in July the British Prime Minister, Margaret Thatcher (right), had told Parliament that if the islands were no longer needed for defence "they should revert to Mauritius".

Mauritius took up the claim in 1980. In July the Organisation of African Unity demanded that Diego Garcia be "unconditionally returned to Mauritius", and in October Ramgoolam told the UN General Assembly that the BIOT should be disbanded and the territory restored to Mauritius. The United Kingdom replied that it had sovereignty over Diego Garcia, but would be "willing to consider ceding sovereignty" to Mauritius if the islands were no longer required for defence. In July 1982, after the Labour government's electoral defeat, Mauritian law was amended to include "the Chagos Archipelago, including Diego Garcia" in the definition of the State of Mauritius, and in 1983 a select committee of the Legislative Assembly identified a "blackmail element" in the 1965 negotiations and concluded that the detachment had violated the UN Charter. Since 1992 the Constitution of Mauritius has defined the country as including the archipelago. Mauritius declared an exclusive economic zone around it in 1984 and later deposited baselines for it with the United Nations; the United Kingdom protested on both occasions.

The two states differ over whether Mauritius's statements at the United Nations claimed present sovereignty or only the islands' eventual return under the 1965 undertaking. The British position, as stated to the General Assembly in 1999, was that the territory "is British and has been since 1814", that Mauritius was "the only State which has the right to assert a claim to sovereignty when the United Kingdom relinquishes its own sovereignty", and that the territory "will be ceded when no longer required for defence purposes". The United Kingdom declined Mauritian proposals in 2000 and 2001 for sovereignty negotiations and for a joint reference to the International Court of Justice (see § Path to the International Court of Justice), but in 2009 the two governments held talks "under a sovereignty umbrella".

Chagossians pursued a separate strand of litigation in the British courts (a full list of decisions is in § Court decisions). In 2000 the Divisional Court quashed the provision of the 1971 ordinance that excluded them (Bancoult (No 1)), and the Immigration Ordinance 2000 allowed them back to the islands other than Diego Garcia, though none returned to live there. After a feasibility study found in 2002 that long-term resettlement would probably be prohibitively costly, the British Indian Ocean Territory (Constitution) Order 2004 declared that "no person has the right of abode in the Territory"; the House of Lords upheld it by three votes to two in 2008 (Bancoult (No 2)). The European Court of Human Rights declared an application by 1,786 Chagossians inadmissible in 2012 (Chagos Islanders v United Kingdom), and after a second feasibility study the government decided in November 2016 against resettlement on grounds of "feasibility, defence and security interests, and cost to the British taxpayer", a decision the courts upheld (R (Hoareau and Bancoult) v Secretary of State for Foreign and Commonwealth Affairs). As prime minister, David Cameron had told the House of Commons in February 2015 that his was "the first Government to really sit down and think about what we could do to help, which is why we commissioned the resettlement studies".

=== Marine protected area (2010) ===
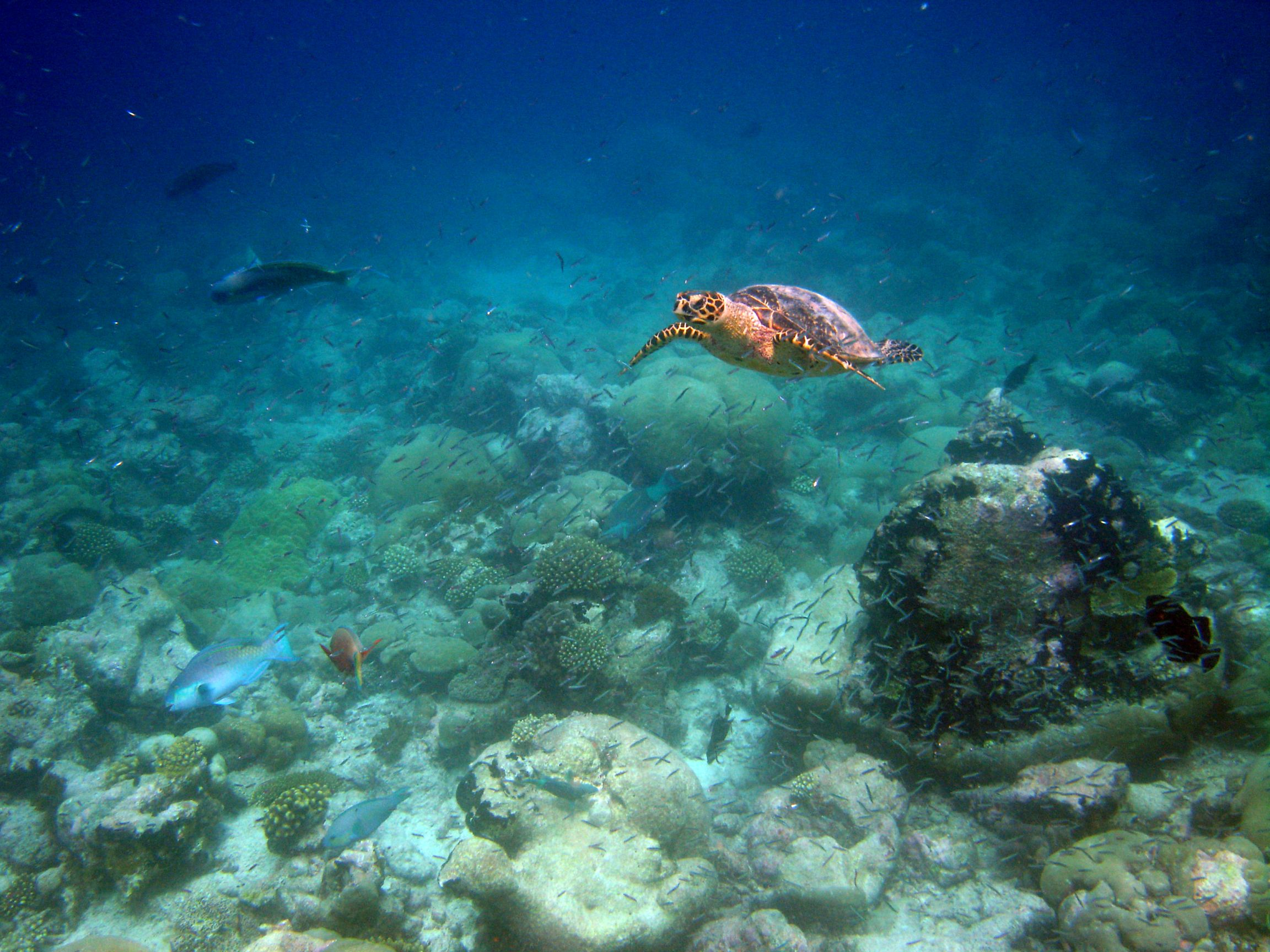
A sea turtle in the Chagos Archipelago. The "no-take" marine protected area proclaimed on 1 April 2010 covered some 250,000 square miles (650,000 km^{2}).

At bilateral talks in July 2009 the United Kingdom proposed a marine protected area around the archipelago, and in November it opened a public consultation. Mauritius objected that it had not agreed to the proposal and that any protected area had to be compatible with its sovereignty and address resettlement and fishing rights. On 1 April 2010 the BIOT Commissioner, Colin Roberts, proclaimed a "no-take" marine protected area covering some 250,000 square miles (650,000 km^{2}); the Foreign Secretary, David Miliband, told the Mauritian Prime Minister that it did not affect the British commitment to cede the territory when it was no longer needed for defence purposes. Mauritius protested the next day that it did not recognise the "so-called British Indian Ocean Territory", that the archipelago "forms an integral part of the sovereign territory of Mauritius both under our national law and international law", and that it would not recognise the protected area.

A US embassy cable of 15 May 2009, published by WikiLeaks and The Guardian in December 2010, recorded Roberts as saying that "establishing a marine park would, in effect, put paid to resettlement claims of the archipelago's former residents". In court Roberts accepted that he had told American officials that a protected area would put paid to resettlement claims, calling this "a recognition of a reality". In Bancoult (No 3) the Supreme Court held in 2018 that the cable was admissible in evidence, but rejected the claim that the protected area had been created for the improper purpose of preventing resettlement. On 20 December 2010 Mauritius began arbitration proceedings against the United Kingdom under the United Nations Convention on the Law of the Sea, challenging the protected area (Mauritius v United Kingdom; see § Arbitration under the Law of the Sea Convention (2010–2015)).

== International legal proceedings ==
=== Arbitration under the Law of the Sea Convention (2010–2015) ===
The Peace Palace in The Hague, seat of the International Court of Justice and of the Permanent Court of Arbitration, which acted as registry for the 2010–2015 arbitration

On 20 December 2010 Mauritius began arbitration proceedings against the United Kingdom under Annex VII of the United Nations Convention on the Law of the Sea (UNCLOS), challenging the marine protected area (MPA) that the United Kingdom had declared around the archipelago on 1 April 2010. Mauritius argued that the United Kingdom was not the "coastal State" entitled to declare the MPA, or alternatively that its 1965 undertakings had given Mauritius rights as a coastal state, and that the MPA was incompatible with its fishing and other rights. The United Kingdom, which asserted that it had acquired sovereignty over the archipelago in 1814, described the case as an attempt to bring the sovereignty dispute within the tribunal's jurisdiction that was "artificial and baseless". The Permanent Court of Arbitration acted as registry for the five-member tribunal.

In its award of 18 March 2015 the tribunal held, by three votes to two, that it had no jurisdiction over Mauritius's first two submissions, which it found were "properly characterized as relating to land sovereignty over the Chagos Archipelago", a dispute that "does not concern the interpretation or application of the Convention". It found that the undertakings given at the Lancaster House talks in 1965—to return the archipelago to Mauritius when it was no longer needed for defence purposes, to preserve for Mauritius the benefit of any minerals or oil, and to ensure fishing rights as far as practicable—had become "a matter of international law between the Parties" when Mauritius became independent, and were legally binding. The tribunal unanimously declared "that in establishing the MPA surrounding the Chagos Archipelago the United Kingdom breached its obligations under Articles 2(3), 56(2), and 194(4) of the Convention", having found that the United Kingdom had not properly consulted Mauritius or balanced its own interests against Mauritius's rights. It saw nothing in the internal British documents that suggested "an ulterior motive or improper purpose". The majority did not decide whether Mauritius had freely consented to the detachment, which it held to be outside its jurisdiction; it found that the repeated reaffirmation of the undertakings since independence resolved "any concern that defects in Mauritian consent in 1965 would have prevented the Lancaster House Undertakings from binding the United Kingdom".

Two arbitrators, James Kateka and Rüdiger Wolfrum, in a joint dissenting and concurring opinion, would have found jurisdiction over the first two submissions and upheld the first. Unlike the majority, they addressed the consent: in their view "Mauritius had no choice", and Wilson's threat that Ramgoolam could return home without independence "amounts to duress". They concluded that by establishing the MPA the United Kingdom had "violated its prior commitments vis-à-vis Mauritius and thus violated Article 56(2) of the Convention", so that "the MPA is legally invalid". They also wrote that "The 1965 excision of the Chagos Archipelago from Mauritius shows a complete disregard for the territorial integrity of Mauritius by the United Kingdom which was the colonial power", and noted "disturbing similarities" between the creation of the British Indian Ocean Territory in 1965 and the proclamation of the MPA in 2010. The United Kingdom later said that the tribunal "did not find that a marine protected area as such was unlawful", but that its establishment had not in certain respects conformed with the convention.

=== Path to the International Court of Justice ===
Mauritius could not bring a contentious case against the United Kingdom before the International Court of Justice (ICJ) without the United Kingdom's consent. The United Kingdom's declaration of 1 January 1969 accepting the court's compulsory jurisdiction excluded "disputes with the Government of any other country which is a Member of the Commonwealth with regard to situations or facts existing before the 1st of January, 1969", and the 1968 declaration of Mauritius likewise excluded disputes with members of the Commonwealth. On 25 January 2001 the Mauritian foreign minister asked whether the two governments could agree to take the sovereignty dispute to the ICJ; the United Kingdom did not agree. In 2004 Mauritius indicated that it intended to bring proceedings and was prepared to leave the Commonwealth to found the court's jurisdiction. "In order to prevent this from happening", in the words of the British written statement to the court, the United Kingdom replaced its declaration on 5 July 2004 with one excluding "any dispute with the government of any other country which is or has been a Member of the Commonwealth". The same exclusion appears in its declarations of 2014 and 2017. In September 2004 the Mauritian foreign minister told the General Assembly that Mauritius "has always favoured a bilateral approach" but would "use all avenues open to us".

Anerood Jugnauth, Prime Minister of Mauritius, in September 2016. In May 2016 he told the Mauritian parliament that Mauritius would take action at the United Nations unless the United Kingdom agreed a date for the archipelago's return; in 2018, as a former prime minister, he represented Mauritius at the court's hearings.

After the 2015 award, the Prime Minister of Mauritius, Sir Anerood Jugnauth, wrote to Cameron that Mauritius was ready to negotiate; according to Jugnauth, Cameron replied on 9 June 2015 proposing discussions on marine conservation, and indicated that the United Kingdom "does not accept that Mauritius has any right to be consulted or to join in negotiations between the United Kingdom and the United States about the defence uses of the Chagos Archipelago". Answering a private notice question from the Leader of the Opposition, Paul Bérenger, in the National Assembly on 17 May 2016, Jugnauth said that two rounds of talks between officials, in November 2015 and May 2016, had made "hardly any progress". He had asked for the archipelago to be returned "by a precise date to be agreed upon", and unless the United Kingdom replied by the end of June, Mauritius would "take appropriate action at the international level, including at the United Nations". He said that Mauritius did not object to the continued use of Diego Garcia as an American base under an agreement for the archipelago's return, and was "even prepared to grant a sixty-year lease to the United States in respect of Diego Garcia, subject to the payment of a rent". He also said that Cameron was unwilling to meet him to discuss the matter, and, while acknowledging that an advisory opinion of the court "will not be binding", that it would "have a moral effect on UK and in the United Nations".

In June 2016 the British and American governments publicly warned Mauritius against taking the dispute to the court. On 23 June Jugnauth received, at their governments' request, Patrick F. Kennedy of the US State Department and Neil Wigan, the Foreign Office's Africa Director. The next morning the British High Commission and the US Embassy in Port Louis issued a joint press statement, which said that the two governments were "absolutely clear about UK sovereignty of these islands, which have been British since 1814", and warned: "Referral of this matter to the International Court of Justice would cause lasting damage to Mauritius' bilateral relations with both the UK and the USA." The Prime Minister's Office replied the same afternoon with a communiqué recording that Jugnauth had told the officials that Mauritius considered the threat that the request "would cause lasting damage to the bilateral relations of Mauritius with both the US and the UK to be hostile and totally unacceptable and in breach of their obligations under international law". It repeated that Mauritius had no objection to the base on Diego Garcia, and said that once an agreement on a date for the archipelago's return was signed, Mauritius was prepared to grant the United States a long-term lease of Diego Garcia, which could be made renewable. In July the British government repeated the warning in Parliament, saying that it valued "the historic relationship of trust and cooperation" with Mauritius but that referral "would cause lasting damage to Mauritius' bilateral relations".

In a conversation with the Foreign Secretary, Boris Johnson, in September 2016, after the request for an advisory opinion had been placed on the General Assembly's agenda, Jugnauth said, according to the British account, that "the question was sovereignty". Media reports in London said that during a visit to New Delhi in January 2017 Johnson had sought India's help over the dispute; Indian government sources quoted by The Asian Age said that he had raised it with senior officials, though not with the Prime Minister, Narendra Modi, and that India had told him that it had "a long-standing and principled position on this subject" and that it was "for Britain and Mauritius to reach an amicable solution on this matter bilaterally". After further bilateral talks failed, on 22 June 2017 the General Assembly adopted resolution 71/292 by 94 votes to 15, with 65 abstentions. The United States said that the request sought "to circumvent the Court's lack of contentious jurisdiction over this purely bilateral matter", and the British representative called it "a back-door route to the Court". In May 2018, while the advisory proceedings were under way, Johnson told the House of Commons that the United Kingdom was "currently in dispute with Mauritius about the Chagossian islanders and Diego Garcia".

=== Advisory opinion (2019) ===
The General Assembly asked the court whether the decolonisation of Mauritius had been "lawfully completed when Mauritius was granted independence in 1968, following the separation of the Chagos Archipelago", and what were "the consequences under international law" of the United Kingdom's continued administration of the archipelago, including for the resettlement of Mauritian nationals, "in particular those of Chagossian origin". Thirty-one states and the African Union filed written statements, ten of those states and the African Union filed written comments, and twenty-two states and the African Union made oral statements at hearings held from 3 to 6 September 2018. At the hearings the United Kingdom said that it "fully accepts that the manner in which the Chagossians were removed from the Chagos Archipelago, and the way they were treated thereafter, was shameful and wrong, and it deeply regrets that fact".

Some participants, including the United Kingdom and the United States, asked the court to decline to answer, arguing among other things that the request concerned a bilateral sovereignty dispute to which the United Kingdom had not consented. The court rejected this argument, holding that "The General Assembly has not sought the Court's opinion to resolve a territorial dispute between two States" and that the issues were "located in the broader frame of reference of decolonization". In its opinion of 25 February 2019 it decided as follows:

Finding	Vote	Against
The court has jurisdiction to give the opinion	Unanimous	–
The court decides to comply with the request	12–2	Tomka, Donoghue
"the process of decolonization of Mauritius was not lawfully completed when that country acceded to independence in 1968, following the separation of the Chagos Archipelago"	13–1	Donoghue
"the United Kingdom is under an obligation to bring to an end its administration of the Chagos Archipelago as rapidly as possible"	13–1	Donoghue
"all Member States are under an obligation to co-operate with the United Nations in order to complete the decolonization of Mauritius"	13–1	Donoghue

The court left "the modalities necessary for ensuring the completion of the decolonization of Mauritius" to the General Assembly. It described the resettlement of Mauritian nationals, "including those of Chagossian origin", as "an issue relating to the protection of the human rights of those concerned, which should be addressed by the General Assembly during the completion of the decolonization of Mauritius".

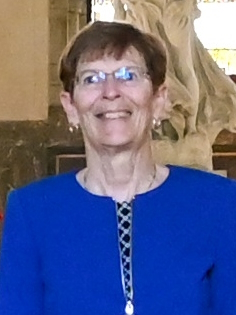
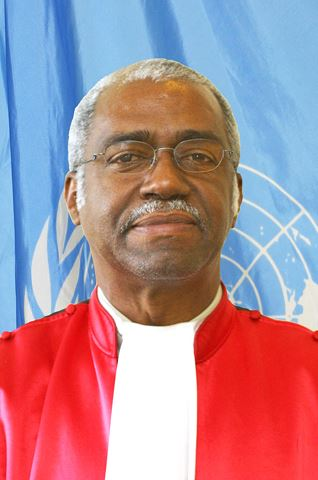
Judge Joan Donoghue (left) was the only member of the court to vote against its substantive findings; Judge Patrick Robinson (right) considered that the "consent" of the Mauritian Council of Ministers "amounts to nothing".

Judge Joan Donoghue, dissenting, considered that the opinion "has the effect of circumventing the absence of United Kingdom consent to judicial settlement of the bilateral dispute", although the detachment and the treatment of the Chagossians "cry out for an authoritative judicial pronouncement". Judge Peter Tomka, who agreed with the answers, was "concerned that advisory proceedings have now become a way of bringing before the Court contentious matters", and Judge Kirill Gevorgian disagreed with the statement on the United Kingdom's international responsibility. Judge Patrick Robinson went further than the court, finding that the "consent" of the Council of Ministers "amounts to nothing". He also examined the 1966 UK–US agreement, under which the United Kingdom had made the islands available for defence purposes and undertaken to resettle their inhabitants; he concluded that it conflicted with the right to self-determination, a norm of jus cogens, and was therefore "void by virtue of Article 53 of the VCLT" and "incapable of producing any legal effects", although the court's operative conclusions made no such finding.

=== Legal basis of the findings ===
The court applied the law of self-determination as it stood between 1965 and 1968, while taking account of its development since the Charter of the United Nations. Its finding that the separation of the archipelago was unlawful rested on four steps:

- Customary status of self-determination. Resolution 1514 (XV) of 1960, the Declaration on the Granting of Independence to Colonial Countries and Peoples, although "formally a recommendation", has in the court's view "a declaratory character with regard to the right to self-determination as a customary norm"; none of the states voting on it in 1960 had contested the existence of the right. Self-determination "must be the expression of the free and genuine will of the people concerned".
- Territorial integrity of a non-self-governing territory. Paragraph 6 of the declaration provides that "Any attempt aimed at the partial or total disruption of the national unity and the territorial integrity of a country is incompatible with the purposes and principles of the Charter of the United Nations". The court found that "State practice and opinio juris at the relevant time confirm the customary law character of the right to territorial integrity of a non-self-governing territory as a corollary of the right to self-determination". It followed that "any detachment by the administering Power of part of a non-self-governing territory, unless based on the freely expressed and genuine will of the people of the territory concerned, is contrary to the right to self-determination".
- Status of the archipelago and the question of consent. Administered from Mauritius since 1814 and listed with it as a non-self-governing territory, the archipelago "was clearly an integral part of that non-self-governing territory" in 1965. When the Council of Ministers agreed to the detachment, Mauritius was a colony "under the authority of the United Kingdom", and the court held that "it is not possible to talk of an international agreement, when one of the parties to it, Mauritius, which is said to have ceded the territory to the United Kingdom, was under the authority of the latter". Applying "heightened scrutiny" to consent where part of a territory is separated to create a new colony, it concluded that "this detachment was not based on the free and genuine expression of the will of the people concerned".
- Obligations reflected in General Assembly resolutions. The obligations "reflected in the resolutions adopted by the General Assembly during the process of decolonization of Mauritius", including resolution 2066 (XX), required the United Kingdom "to respect the territorial integrity of that country, including the Chagos Archipelago". "As a result of the Chagos Archipelago's unlawful detachment and its incorporation into a new colony", decolonisation was "not lawfully completed" in 1968.

From this the court drew its answer to the second question: the United Kingdom's continued administration "constitutes a wrongful act entailing the international responsibility of that State" and "an unlawful act of a continuing character", which it must end "as rapidly as possible". Because respect for self-determination is an obligation erga omnes, "all States have a legal interest in protecting that right", and all member states must co-operate with the United Nations to complete the decolonisation of Mauritius.

The United Kingdom and the United States rejected this reasoning. The United Kingdom argued that the decolonisation of Mauritius "was lawfully complete" on 12 March 1968 because "The elected representatives of Mauritius had freely agreed to the detachment", that resolution 1514 (XV) "was an aspirational instrument" whose paragraph 6 did not reflect customary law, and that a legal right to self-determination "did not come into existence or bind the United Kingdom until after the end of the 1960s". After the opinion it said that the court had given "insufficient regard" to "Mauritius's freely given consent to enter into the 1965 agreement", and that the opinion was "advisory and not legally binding". The United States argued that there was no "international law rule in 1965 that would have made the establishment of the British Indian Ocean Territory (BIOT) unlawful", and asked the court to decline to give the opinion.

== Consequences ==
=== General Assembly resolution 73/295 (2019) ===
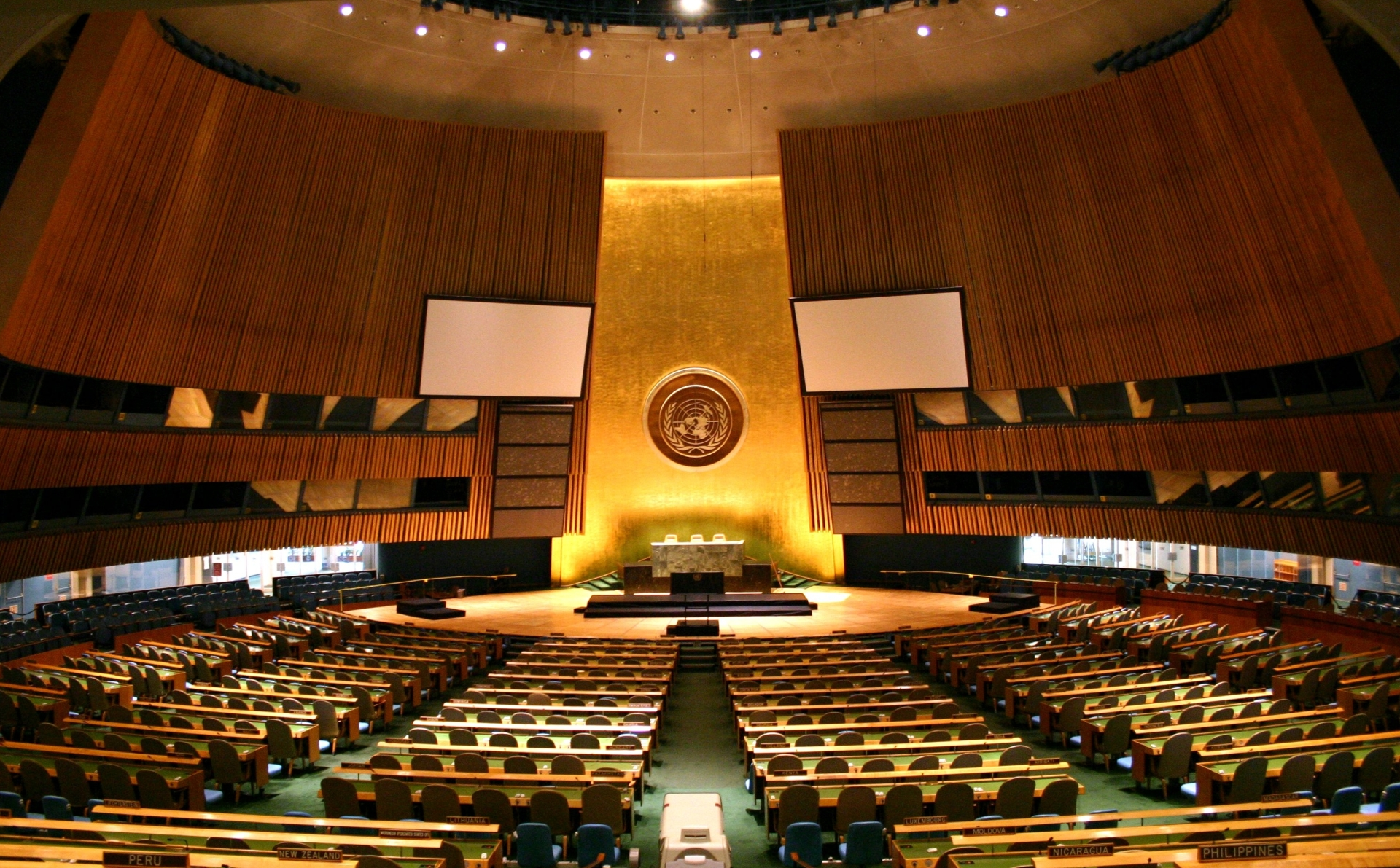
The General Assembly Hall at United Nations Headquarters in New York. On 22 May 2019 the Assembly adopted resolution 73/295 by 116 votes to 6, with 56 abstentions.

On 22 May 2019 the General Assembly adopted resolution 73/295, introduced by Senegal on behalf of the African Group, by 116 votes to 6, with 56 abstentions; Australia, Hungary, Israel, the Maldives, the United Kingdom and the United States voted against. The resolution welcomed the opinion and affirmed, "in accordance with the advisory opinion of the Court", that "The Chagos Archipelago forms an integral part of the territory of Mauritius". It demanded that the United Kingdom "withdraw its colonial administration from the Chagos Archipelago unconditionally within a period of no more than six months", urged it "to pose no impediment or obstacle" to the resettlement of Mauritian nationals, including those of Chagossian origin, and called on member states, the United Nations and its specialised agencies, and "all other international, regional and intergovernmental organizations" to recognise that the archipelago forms part of Mauritius and to refrain from "recognizing, or giving effect to any measure taken by or on behalf of, the 'British Indian Ocean Territory'".

The Mauritian Prime Minister, Pravind Jugnauth, told the Assembly that the opinion was "clear and unambiguous and leaves no room for any doubt or other interpretation", and called the eviction of the Chagossians "a very dark episode of human history, akin to a crime against humanity". The British representative, Karen Pierce, said that the draft "still goes beyond the advisory opinion" by setting a deadline and calling on states and organisations to act, that advisory opinions "are not legally binding", and rejected "unconditionally" the allegation of crimes against humanity. The United States said that the court "did not say that today Mauritius is sovereign over the British Indian Ocean Territory, or suggest that States or international organizations must recognize it as such". The six-month period ended on 22 November 2019 without the United Kingdom withdrawing.

=== Mauritius–Maldives maritime boundary case (2019–2023) ===
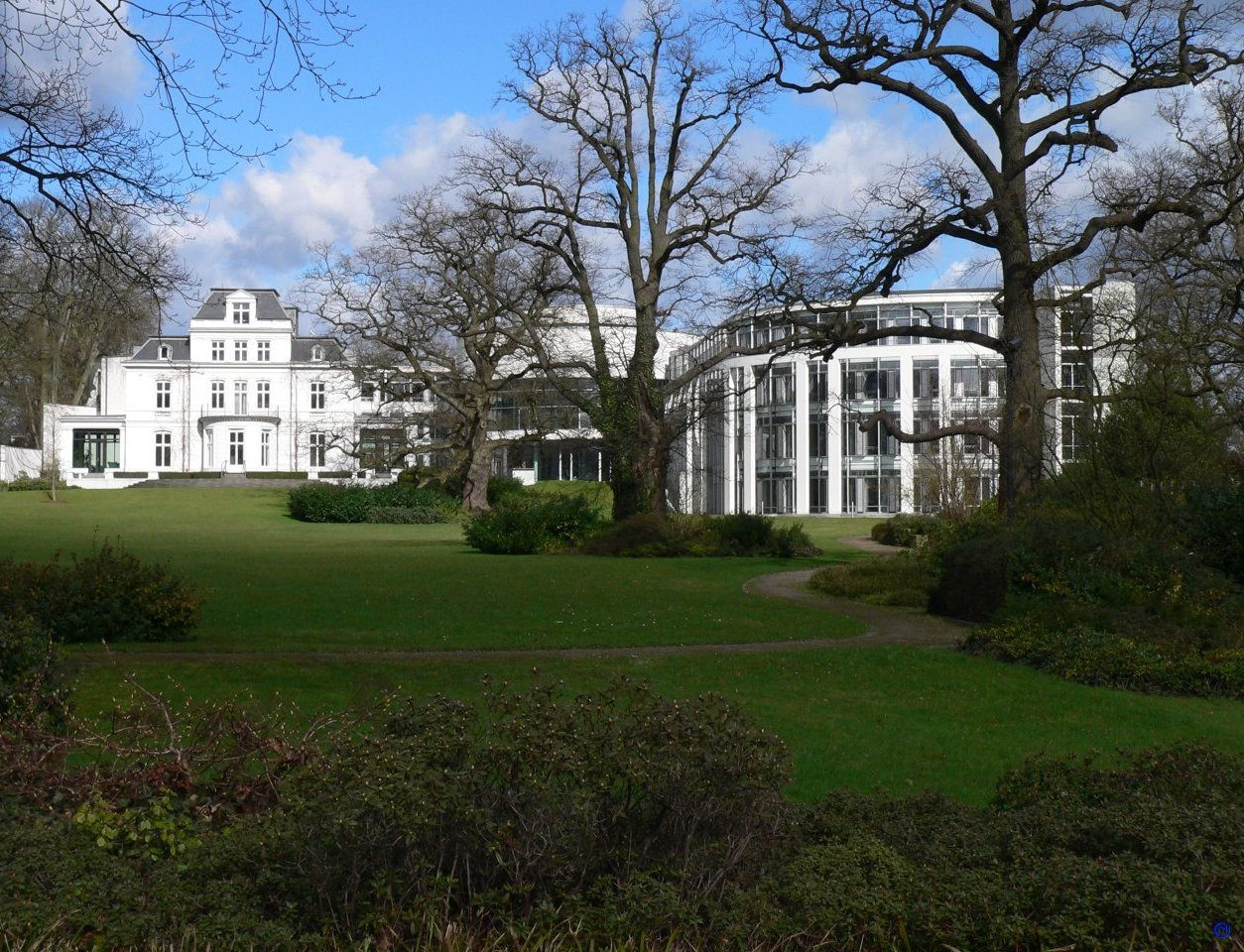
The International Tribunal for the Law of the Sea in Hamburg. A special chamber of the tribunal held in 2021 that Mauritius could be regarded as the coastal state for the purpose of delimiting the boundary with the Maldives, which it fixed in 2023.

On 18 June 2019 Mauritius began proceedings against the Maldives to delimit the maritime boundary between the Maldives and the archipelago; by a special agreement of 24 September 2019 the case was transferred to a special chamber of the International Tribunal for the Law of the Sea (ITLOS). The Maldives objected that the United Kingdom was an indispensable third party and that the chamber could not decide the disputed sovereignty over the archipelago. On 28 January 2021 the special chamber rejected all five of its objections, two of them by eight votes to one. It accepted that advisory opinions "cannot be considered legally binding", but held that "judicial determinations made in advisory opinions carry no less weight and authority than those in judgments" and that the ICJ's determinations on the archipelago "do have legal effect". If the ICJ had determined that the archipelago is part of Mauritius, the chamber reasoned, the continued British claim "cannot be considered anything more than 'a mere assertion'"; it concluded that "Mauritius' sovereignty over the Chagos Archipelago can be inferred from the ICJ's determinations", and that Mauritius "can be regarded as the coastal State" for the purpose of the delimitation. The dissenting judge ad hoc, Bernard Oxman, found the conclusion hard to reconcile with "a cautious view of the legally binding effect of the ICJ advisory opinion". The United Kingdom, which was not a party, had said in November 2019 that the proceedings "can have no effect for the UK". On 28 April 2023 the special chamber unanimously fixed a single maritime boundary within 200 nautical miles, giving half effect to Blenheim Reef, and declined to delimit the continental shelf beyond 200 nautical miles.

=== Other international bodies and measures ===
The United Nations world map released on 20 February 2020. After resolution 73/295 the Secretariat changed the designation of the Chagos Archipelago on its maps.

Shortly after resolution 73/295 was adopted, the United Nations Secretariat asked United Nations entities "to review and, as necessary, adjust any relevant practices", and by May 2020 "the designation of the Chagos Archipelago has been modified on the maps produced by the Secretariat". The Government of Mauritius said in May 2020 that a new United Nations world map depicted the archipelago as Mauritian territory. In August 2021 the congress of the Universal Postal Union voted, by 77 to 6 with 41 abstentions, to acknowledge the archipelago as part of Mauritius, with the result that the union "will no longer register, distribute or forward postage stamps issued by the 'British Indian Ocean Territory'". At the Indian Ocean Tuna Commission, where Mauritius sought from 2019 to end the United Kingdom's membership as a coastal state, the Legal Counsel of the Food and Agriculture Organization advised in May 2022 that the organisation, as depositary, recognised that "the Chagos Archipelago forms an integral part of the territory of Mauritius", and that it would be "anomalous" to treat the United Kingdom's 1995 acceptance of the commission's agreement in respect of the territory as still valid. The commission noted the advice and the United Kingdom's objection to it, and has since deferred a decision on the status of the United Kingdom's membership, most recently in April 2025. In December 2025 the Committee on the Elimination of Racial Discrimination, under its early-warning procedure, called on Mauritius and the United Kingdom "to suspend the ratification of the bilateral agreement" of 2025 and to ensure the Chagossians' "free, prior and informed consent". According to a statement issued on their behalf, the procedure had been triggered on 26 May 2025, four days after the treaty was signed, by two Chagossian women born on Diego Garcia who opposed the treaty, Bertrice Pompe and Bernadette Dugasse. Mauritius told the committee in December 2025 that it deplored the decision, which it said caused "serious prejudice to the Republic of Mauritius as a sovereign state", and a British minister told the House of Lords in January 2026 that "The UK does not agree with the approach that the CERD has taken".

Mauritius also acted on the resolution: in 2019 it told diplomatic missions that marine scientific research in the waters of the archipelago required its consent; the United Kingdom replied that any approval granted by Mauritius "would not be recognized or accepted". In November 2021 it made it an offence, punishable by up to ten years' imprisonment, to produce or distribute, on behalf of a foreign state found by an international court or tribunal to have no valid claim to Mauritian territory, coins, stamps, official maps or other official documents that misrepresent Mauritian sovereignty. The offence, section 76B of the Criminal Code, was repealed by the National Assembly on 28 October 2025; the British government welcomed the repeal and said that no one had ever been prosecuted under it. On 14 February 2022, during a survey of Blenheim Reef carried out for the case against the Maldives, Mauritian officials accompanied by Chagossians raised the Mauritian flag on Peros Banhos; the Foreign Office said that the United Kingdom did not recognise Mauritius's claim.

=== United Kingdom and United States positions after 2019 ===
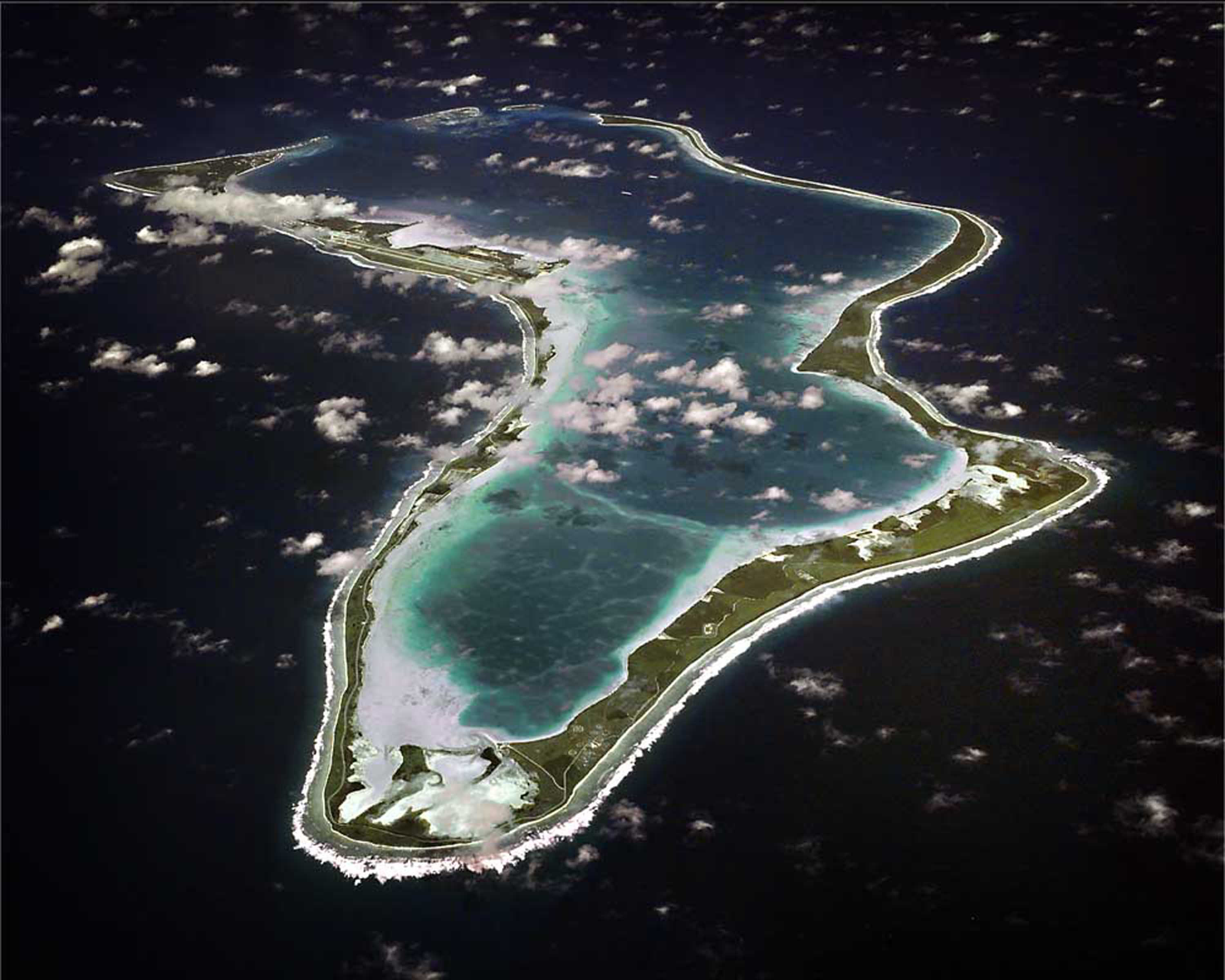
Diego Garcia from the air, 2013

In a written statement to Parliament on 30 April 2019, the Foreign Office minister Sir Alan Duncan said that an advisory opinion "is not a legally binding judgment", and that "we have no doubt about our sovereignty over the Chagos Archipelago, which has been under continuous British sovereignty since 1814". The Leader of the Opposition, Jeremy Corbyn, wrote to the Prime Minister, Theresa May, that "the government appears ready to disregard international law and ignore a ruling of the international court and the right of the Chagossians to return to their homes". In January 2020 the government told the Secretary-General that it had "no doubt about its sovereignty over the British Indian Ocean Territory" but remained committed to ceding the territory "when it is no longer required for defence purposes". The United States Secretary of State, Mike Pompeo, said in May 2019 that the United States "unequivocally supports UK sovereignty over the British Indian Ocean Territory", and in February 2020 the United States reiterated "its unequivocal support for the position that the United Kingdom is and remains sovereign". On 3 November 2022 the two governments announced that they would negotiate on the exercise of sovereignty over the archipelago, talks that led to the 2025 treaty (see below).

== Court decisions ==
The following table lists the decisions of courts and tribunals concerning the sovereignty of the archipelago, its marine protected area, and the removal and return of the Chagossians. Cases about other matters arising in the territory are not included.

Court and tribunal decisions concerning the Chagos Archipelago and the Chagossians
Court	Year	Case	Outcome	Citation
High Court of Justice (England and Wales)	1975–1982	Vencatessen v Attorney General	Damages claim by a Chagossian for his removal in 1971; stayed by agreement on 8 October 1982, after the 1982 UK–Mauritius agreement on compensation	Unreported
High Court (Divisional Court)	2000	Bancoult (No 1)	Section 4 of the 1971 Immigration Ordinance, which excluded the islanders, quashed; the government did not appeal	[2000] EWHC 413 (Admin)
High Court	2003	Chagos Islanders v Attorney General	Group claim for compensation and a right of return struck out	[2003] EWHC 2222 (QB)
Court of Appeal	2004	Chagos Islanders v Attorney General	Permission to appeal refused	[2004] EWCA Civ 997
United States District Court for the District of Columbia	2004	Bancoult v. McNamara	Claims against the United States and former officials dismissed	370 F. Supp. 2d 1
High Court (Divisional Court)	2006	Bancoult (No 2)	Section 9 of the British Indian Ocean Territory (Constitution) Order 2004, denying any right of abode, quashed as irrational	[2006] EWHC 1038 (Admin)
US Court of Appeals, D.C. Circuit	2006	Bancoult v. McNamara	Dismissal affirmed: the claims raised non-justiciable political questions	445 F.3d 427
Court of Appeal	2007	Bancoult (No 2)	Government's appeal dismissed	[2007] EWCA Civ 498
Supreme Court of the United States	2007	Bancoult v. McNamara	Certiorari denied	549 U.S. 1166
House of Lords	2008	Bancoult (No 2)	Government's appeal allowed by three to two; the 2004 Orders in Council upheld	[2008] UKHL 61
Arbitral tribunal under UNCLOS Annex VII	2011	Mauritius v United Kingdom	Mauritius's challenge to the appointment of the arbitrator Christopher Greenwood dismissed	Decision of 13 October 2011
European Court of Human Rights	2012	Chagos Islanders v United Kingdom	Application declared inadmissible	Application no. 35622/04
High Court (Divisional Court)	2013	Bancoult (No 3)	Challenge to the marine protected area dismissed	[2013] EWHC 1502 (Admin)
Court of Appeal	2014	Bancoult (No 3)	Appeal dismissed; leaked US embassy cable held admissible	[2014] EWCA Civ 708
Arbitral tribunal under UNCLOS Annex VII	2015	Mauritius v United Kingdom	The 1965 undertakings legally binding; the marine protected area declared in breach of UNCLOS articles 2(3), 56(2) and 194(4) (unanimous)	Award of 18 March 2015
High Court	2016	R (Horeau) v Secretary of State for Foreign and Commonwealth Affairs	Permission to challenge the 2015 consultation on resettlement refused	[2016] EWHC 2102 (Admin)
Supreme Court of the United Kingdom	2016	Bancoult (No 2) (application to set aside)	Application to set aside the 2008 decision refused by three to two	[2016] UKSC 35
Supreme Court of the United Kingdom	2018	Bancoult (No 3)	Appeal dismissed by five to two; the cable admissible but not decisive	[2018] UKSC 3
High Court (Divisional Court)	2019	Hoareau and Bancoult	Challenge to the 2016 decision against resettlement dismissed	[2019] EWHC 221 (Admin)
International Court of Justice	2019	Legal Consequences of the Separation of the Chagos Archipelago from Mauritius in 1965	Advisory opinion: decolonisation of Mauritius not lawfully completed; the United Kingdom to end its administration as rapidly as possible (13–1)	I.C.J. Reports 2019, p. 95
Court of Appeal	2020	Hoareau and Bancoult	Appeal dismissed	[2020] EWCA Civ 1010
ITLOS Special Chamber	2021	Mauritius/Maldives (preliminary objections)	The Maldives' five objections rejected; Mauritius regarded as the coastal state for the archipelago	ITLOS Reports 2020–2021, p. 17
ITLOS Special Chamber	2023	Mauritius/Maldives (merits)	Single maritime boundary fixed within 200 nautical miles (unanimous); no delimitation beyond 200 nautical miles	Judgment of 28 April 2023
High Court (out-of-hours judge)	2025	Pompe (interim)	Injunction delaying the signature of the 2025 treaty granted at 2.25 am on 22 May; discharged by Chamberlain J the same morning	Unreported
Supreme Court of the British Indian Ocean Territory	2026	Mandarin v Commissioner (interim)	Interim injunction against the removal of four Chagossians from Île du Coin (19 February)	Unreported
High Court	2026	Pompe and Mandarin	Permission to challenge the 2025 treaty refused (10 March)	[2026] EWHC 529 (Admin)
Supreme Court of the British Indian Ocean Territory	2026	Mandarin v Commissioner	Section 9 of the 2004 Constitution Order and the removal notices quashed (31 March); effect stayed pending appeal	Judgment of 31 March 2026
Court of Appeal of the British Indian Ocean Territory	2026	Commissioner v Mandarin	Commissioner's appeal heard on 15–17 July 2026; judgment to be handed down on 12 November 2026	[2026] BIOT CA (Civ) 1

== United Nations resolutions ==
Votes are given as in favour–against–abstaining.

United Nations resolutions concerning the Chagos Archipelago
Resolution	Date	Body	Vote	Summary	Article
2066 (XX)	16 December 1965	General Assembly (1,398th plenary meeting)	89–0–18 (no roll call)	Noted "with deep concern" that any step to detach islands from Mauritius "for the purpose of establishing a military base" would contravene the Declaration on the Granting of Independence; invited the administering power "to take no action which would dismember the Territory of Mauritius and violate its territorial integrity".	Resolution 2066 (XX)
2232 (XXI)	20 December 1966	General Assembly (1,500th plenary meeting)	93–0–24 (recorded vote); operative paragraph 4 adopted separately by 72–18–27	Concerned a group of territories including Mauritius and Seychelles. Reiterated that "any attempt aimed at the partial or total disruption of the national unity and the territorial integrity of colonial Territories and the establishment of military bases and installations in these Territories is incompatible with the purposes and principles of the Charter".	Resolution 2232 (XXI)
A/AC.109/249	19 June 1967	Special Committee (539th meeting)	17–2–3 (roll call; Australia and the United States against)	Deplored "the dismemberment of Mauritius and Seychelles by the administering Power which violates their territorial integrity, in contravention of General Assembly resolutions 2066 (XX) and 2232 (XXI)", and called on the administering power to return the detached islands. Declared the establishment of military installations in the territories a violation of resolution 2232 (XXI).	–
2357 (XXII)	19 December 1967	General Assembly (1,641st plenary meeting)	86–0–27 (recorded vote); operative paragraph 4 adopted separately by 78–16–16	Expressed deep concern at the continuation of policies aimed at disrupting the territorial integrity of some of the territories and at creating military bases in them. Repeated the declaration in paragraph 4 of resolution 2232 (XXI).	Resolution 2357 (XXII)
71/292	22 June 2017	General Assembly (88th plenary meeting)	94–15–65 (recorded vote)	Asked the ICJ whether the decolonisation of Mauritius was "lawfully completed" in 1968, and what consequences arose from the United Kingdom's continued administration of the archipelago, "including with respect to the inability of Mauritius to implement a programme for the resettlement on the Chagos Archipelago of its nationals, in particular those of Chagossian origin".	Resolution 71/292
73/295	22 May 2019	General Assembly (83rd plenary meeting)	116–6–56 (recorded vote)	Affirmed that "the Chagos Archipelago forms an integral part of the territory of Mauritius", and demanded that the United Kingdom "withdraw its colonial administration from the Chagos Archipelago unconditionally within a period of no more than six months". Called on the United Nations, its specialised agencies and other organisations not to recognise or give effect to measures taken by or on behalf of the "British Indian Ocean Territory".	Resolution 73/295

The ICJ also relied on general resolutions on decolonisation, among them resolution 66 (I) of 1946, which listed Mauritius as a non-self-governing territory, the 1960 declaration (resolution 1514 (XV)) and resolution 1541 (XV), and the 1970 Friendly Relations Declaration (resolution 2625 (XXV)). Mauritius has also invoked the 1971 declaration of the Indian Ocean as a zone of peace, resolution 2832 (XXVI), against the expansion of the base on Diego Garcia.

== International support for Mauritius's claim ==
=== Regional and international organisations ===
The Organisation of African Unity and its successor, the African Union, have supported Mauritius's claim since 1980, and the Non-Aligned Movement since at least 1983. The General Assembly noted their resolutions, and "the deep concern expressed therein at the forcible removal ... of all the inhabitants of the Chagos Archipelago", when it requested the advisory opinion. The African Union took part in every stage of the proceedings before the ICJ, with a written statement, written comments and an oral statement. According to Mauritius's report to the Secretary-General, after resolution 73/295 the Non-Aligned Movement, the Group of 77 and the African, Caribbean and Pacific Group of States called for the decolonisation of Mauritius to be completed, and in February 2020 the African Union expressed "deep concern" at the United Kingdom's failure to respect the resolution.

Positions of regional and international organisations
Organisation	Date	Instrument	Position
Organisation of African Unity	July 1980	Resolution AHG/Res. 99 (XVII) on Diego Garcia	Demanded that Diego Garcia "be unconditionally returned to Mauritius"
Non-Aligned Movement	March 1983	Summit declaration, New Delhi	"the establishment and strengthening of the military base at Diego Garcia has endangered the sovereignty, territorial integrity and peaceful development of Mauritius and other States"
Organisation of African Unity	July 2000	Decision AHG/Dec.159 (XXXVI)	Concern that the archipelago was "excised by the colonial power from Mauritius prior to its independence in violation of UN Resolution 1514"
African Union	July 2010	Decision Assembly/AU/Dec.331 (XV)	The archipelago, "which was unlawfully excised by the former colonial power from the territory of Mauritius", forms an integral part of Mauritius
African Union	January 2011	Resolution Assembly/AU/Res.1 (XVI)	The archipelago "was unlawfully excised by the United Kingdom, the former colonial power, from the territory of Mauritius prior to independence"
Third Africa–South America Summit	February 2013	Malabo Declaration	The archipelago "forms an integral part of the territory of the Republic of Mauritius"; the marine protected area "contravenes international law"
African Union	May 2013	Solemn Declaration on the 50th anniversary of the OAU/AU	A "call to end expeditiously the unlawful occupation of the Chagos Archipelago"
African Union	June 2015	Resolution Assembly/AU/Res.1 (XXV)	Recalled "the unlawful excision of the Chagos Archipelago, including Diego Garcia, from the territory of Mauritius"
African Union	January 2017	Resolution Assembly/AU/Res.1 (XXVIII)	Condemned the "unlawful excision" of the archipelago "in violation of international law and UN Resolutions", and resolved "to fully support the action initiated by the Government of the Republic of Mauritius at the level of the United Nations General Assembly"
Non-Aligned Movement	September 2016	Final document of the 17th summit, Margarita Island	The archipelago "was illegally removed from the territory of Mauritius by the former colonial Power"; members called on to support the African Group's request for an advisory opinion
Southern African Development Community	June 2017	Statement at the General Assembly	Supported the request for an advisory opinion
African Union	January 2018	Decision Assembly/AU/Dec.684 (XXX)	Deplored "the continued unlawful occupation by the United Kingdom of the Chagos Archipelago"
Non-Aligned Movement	April 2018	Ministerial conference	The archipelago "was illegally detached from the territory of Mauritius by the colonial Power, in violation of international law and resolutions 1514 (XV) and 2066 (XX)"
Group of 77	September 2019	Ministerial Declaration	Supported the completion of the decolonisation of Mauritius, according to Mauritius
Non-Aligned Movement	October 2019	Final document of the Baku summit	Resolved to co-operate with the General Assembly in ensuring the prompt decolonisation of Mauritius, according to Mauritius
African, Caribbean and Pacific Group of States	December 2019	Nairobi Nguvu Ya Pamoja Declaration	Urged the United Kingdom to comply with the advisory opinion and resolution 73/295, according to Mauritius
African Union	February 2020	Decision of the 33rd ordinary session of the Assembly	"Deep concern" at the United Kingdom's failure to respect resolution 73/295
African Union Commission	October 2024	Statement of the chairperson	Welcomed the UK–Mauritius political agreement as "a major victory for the cause of Decolonization"

=== States in the advisory proceedings ===
Thirty-seven states and the African Union took part in the advisory proceedings, in writing, orally or both. In their own statements, eighteen of those states and the African Union argued that the decolonisation of Mauritius had not been lawfully completed, and Belize and Cyprus took the same view with qualifications. Four states supported the court answering without addressing the merits; Australia, France, Israel, the United Kingdom and the United States argued that it should decline; and Chile, China, Germany, the Netherlands, Russia, South Korea and Thailand took other positions, as summarised in the table.

Participants in the ICJ advisory proceedings (2018) and their positions
Participant	Written statement	Oral statement	Position
African Union	Yes	Yes	Supported Mauritius: decolonisation "incomplete and thus unlawful"
Argentina	Yes	Yes	Supported Mauritius: decolonisation "not lawfully completed"; other states not to recognise the situation
Australia	Yes	Yes	Court should decline; no position on the merits
Belize	Yes	Yes	Supported Mauritius conditionally: without the people's free consent, decolonisation "would not have been lawfully completed"
Botswana	–	Yes	Supported Mauritius: the administering power "was not entitled, in 1965 to 1968, to separate a part of non-self-governing territory"
Brazil	Yes	Yes	Supported Mauritius: decolonisation "not lawfully completed"
Chile	Yes	–	Supported decolonisation, but said the bilateral dispute "should be addressed by other means under international law"
China	Yes	–	Supported decolonisation; asked the court to respect the principle of consent in a purely bilateral dispute; no position on the merits
Cuba	Yes	–	Supported Mauritius: the archipelago was "illegally separated" from Mauritius
Cyprus	Yes	Yes	Supported Mauritius in its oral statement, without commenting on the validity of the 1965 agreement
Djibouti	Yes	–	Supported Mauritius: decolonisation "not lawfully completed"
France	Yes	–	Court should decline, the real object being a bilateral dispute
Germany	Yes	Yes	Court could answer within narrow limits; "not taking a position as to the merits"
Guatemala	Yes	Yes	Supported Mauritius: decolonisation not lawfully completed
India	Yes	Yes	Supported Mauritius: decolonisation "remains incomplete"
Israel	Yes	Yes	Court should decline; no position on the merits
Kenya	–	Yes	Supported Mauritius: decolonisation "was not lawfully completed"
Lesotho	Yes	–	Court should answer; did not address the merits
Liechtenstein	Yes	–	Court should answer; did not address the merits
Madagascar	Yes	–	Supported Mauritius, endorsing the African Union's position
Marshall Islands	Yes	Yes	Supported Mauritius (explicitly in its oral statement)
Mauritius	Yes	Yes	Requesting state: decolonisation "not lawfully completed"
Namibia	Yes	–	Supported Mauritius: decolonisation "not lawfully completed"
Netherlands	Yes	–	Addressed only the general law: partition was permitted only if it was "the clear wish of the majority of all inhabitants"
Nicaragua	Yes	Yes	Supported Mauritius: decolonisation "has not been lawfully completed"
Niger	Yes	–	Court should answer; did not address the merits
Nigeria	–	Yes	Supported Mauritius
Russia	Yes	–	The General Assembly cannot settle the status of a territory; no position on the merits
Serbia	Yes	Yes	Supported Mauritius: the separation "was conducted contrary to international law"
Seychelles	Yes	–	Supported Mauritius in its written comments
South Africa	Yes	Yes	Supported Mauritius: decolonisation "not lawfully completed"
South Korea	Yes	–	Addressed only the court's discretion; "does not take a stance" on the dispute
Thailand	–	Yes	Treated the question as one of decolonisation rather than a bilateral dispute; did not answer the first question expressly
United Kingdom	Yes	Yes	Court should decline; alternatively, decolonisation was "lawfully completed" in 1968
United States	Yes	Yes	Court should decline; alternatively, no rule in 1965 made the detachment unlawful
Vanuatu	–	Yes	Supported Mauritius: decolonisation "was not lawfully completed"
Viet Nam	Yes	–	Court should answer; did not address the merits
Zambia	–	Yes	Supported Mauritius: decolonisation "has not been lawfully completed"

=== Votes and national positions ===
Resolution 71/292 was adopted in 2017 by 94 votes to 15, with 65 abstentions; the states voting against were Afghanistan, Albania, Australia, Bulgaria, Croatia, Hungary, Israel, Japan, Lithuania, the Maldives, Montenegro, New Zealand, South Korea, the United Kingdom and the United States. No African state voted against or abstained; the United Kingdom pointed out that fewer than half of the members of the United Nations had supported the resolution. Resolution 73/295 was adopted in 2019 by 116 votes to 6, with 56 abstentions; only Australia, Hungary, Israel, the Maldives, the United Kingdom and the United States voted against. China, which had abstained in 2017 while expressing "firm support for the decolonization process and its understanding of the position of Mauritius", voted in favour in 2019.

The Indian Prime Minister, Narendra Modi, meeting Navin Ramgoolam in Port Louis in March 2025. India said in 2024 that it "has consistently supported Mauritius's claim for sovereignty over Chagos".

Among individual states, India said in 2017 that "it is a matter of principle for India to uphold the process of decolonization", and in 2024 that it "has consistently supported Mauritius's claim for sovereignty over Chagos". Argentina told the Secretary-General in 2020 that it "recognizes the sovereignty of Mauritius over the Chagos Archipelago", and Indonesia told the General Assembly in 2019 that it "fully recognizes the sovereignty of Mauritius over the Chagos archipelago". Seychelles, whose islands detached in 1965 were returned in 1976, said that "the same precedent should be applied in the case of Mauritius".

Of the states that voted against, Australia said that it "does not take a position on the merits of this matter" and objected to the use of the court's advisory jurisdiction for a bilateral dispute, and Israel said that resolution 73/295 "goes even further than the advisory opinion". The Maldives, which has a maritime boundary with the archipelago, said in 2019 that the draft "prejudges the implications" of its 2010 submission to the Commission on the Limits of the Continental Shelf. In 2022 it told Mauritius that it would vote for a future resolution giving effect to the opinion, but in February 2026 Mauritius suspended diplomatic relations with it, citing its stand that it "no longer recognizes the sovereignty of the Republic of Mauritius over the Chagos Archipelago" and its objection to the 2025 treaty. According to the Anadolu Agency, the Maldivian president, Mohamed Muizzu, had said that the Maldives held a stronger historical and legal claim to the archipelago than Mauritius.

== Negotiations and the 2025 agreement ==
=== Negotiations (2022–2024) ===
Liz Truss and Pravind Jugnauth at the UN General Assembly, 21 September 2022. The negotiations announced in November followed their meeting.

David Lammy and Jugnauth at the Foreign Office in London, 23 July 2024

On 3 November 2022 the Foreign Secretary, James Cleverly, announced that, following a meeting at the United Nations General Assembly between the then prime minister, Liz Truss, and the Prime Minister of Mauritius, Pravind Jugnauth, "the UK and Mauritius have decided to begin negotiations on the exercise of sovereignty over the British Indian Ocean Territory (BIOT)/Chagos Archipelago". Any agreement, he said, would "ensure the continued effective operation of the joint UK/US military base on Diego Garcia", and the United States and India would be kept informed. Eleven rounds of talks were held under the Conservative government between November 2022 and June 2024. In January 2024 Cameron, by then Lord Cameron and Foreign Secretary, told the Commons Foreign Affairs Committee that in any negotiation "the overriding question must be the safety, security and usability of this base", described the court's opinion as "an advisory judgment, not a final judgment", and said: "When I was Prime Minister, it was all about trying to see if we could relocate Chagossians back on to the outer islands; lots of work was done, and it was not possible." The Guardian described his remarks as "abruptly ruling out the resettlement" of the islanders, and reported that Chagossian groups had criticised them and that Human Rights Watch had written to him expressing its "extreme concern".

After the general election of July 2024 the Labour government of Keir Starmer appointed Jonathan Powell as special envoy, and two further rounds followed in August and September. On 3 October 2024 Starmer and Jugnauth announced "an historic political agreement on the exercise of sovereignty over the Chagos Archipelago". The United Kingdom would accept Mauritian sovereignty over the whole archipelago, including Diego Garcia, and would be authorised to exercise Mauritius's sovereign rights over Diego Garcia for an initial 99 years; Mauritius would be "free to implement a programme of resettlement" on the other islands, and the United Kingdom would capitalise a trust fund for Chagossians and make "an indexed annual payment". The Foreign Secretary, David Lammy, told the House of Commons that "A binding judgement against the UK seemed inevitable". President Joe Biden said that the agreement "secures the effective operation of the joint facility on Diego Garcia into the next century", and India's Ministry of External Affairs said: "This significant understanding completes the decolonisation of Mauritius."

=== Renegotiation and signature (2024–2025) ===
After Jugnauth's government lost the general election, his successor, Navin Ramgoolam, ordered an independent review of the draft treaty, whose contents he said had been unknown to the new government, and submitted counterproposals. He told the National Assembly in February 2025 that his predecessor's agreement "was a sell-out": Mauritian sovereignty over Diego Garcia had not been "unambiguous and undiluted", the United Kingdom alone could have extended the 99-year term by 40 years, and the financial package "was very badly negotiated". His government renegotiated the financial terms, which he described as "inflation-proof", and the conditions for extending the lease.

On 15 January 2025 the British government told Mauritius that it would seek the views of the incoming administration of Donald Trump before signing. The incoming Secretary of State, Marco Rubio, had said that the deal posed a threat to US security; Starmer's spokesman said: "It is perfectly reasonable for the new U.S. administration to consider the detail." Receiving Starmer at the White House on 27 February, Trump said: "I think we'll be inclined to go along with your country", and on 1 April Downing Street indicated that he had approved the deal.

Keir Starmer (left) speaking at the Permanent Joint Headquarters, Northwood, on 22 May 2025, the day the treaty was signed; he and Navin Ramgoolam (right) signed it in a virtual ceremony "at London and Port Louis".

The signing on 22 May 2025 was briefly delayed when Bertrice Pompe, a British national born on Diego Garcia, obtained an out-of-hours High Court order at 2.25 am preventing the government from taking "any conclusive or legally binding steps" to conclude the negotiations. Mr Justice Chamberlain discharged the order around noon, and Starmer and Ramgoolam then signed the treaty at a ceremony held in London and Port Louis. The State Department said that the United States "welcomed the historic agreement", and commended both governments "for their leadership, vision, and commitment to ensure that Diego Garcia remains fully operational for the duration of this agreement".

=== Terms of the agreement ===
The treaty's preamble refers to "the decisions of international courts and tribunals, including the International Court of Justice", recognises "the wrongs of the past", and records "the need to complete the process of decolonisation of Mauritius".

Article 1 provides that "Mauritius is sovereign over the Chagos Archipelago in its entirety, including Diego Garcia". Under Article 2 Mauritius, "as sovereign", authorises the United Kingdom to exercise its rights over Diego Garcia (the island and a 12-nautical-mile zone around it) for the operation of the base, jointly with the United States. Mauritius keeps title and the rights it does not delegate; some, such as civil and criminal jurisdiction, it may exercise on Diego Garcia under the treaty's terms, but others, such as sovereignty over natural resources, only by joint decision. The treaty lasts 99 years and may be extended by 40 years if the parties agree the conditions; if it is not extended, the United Kingdom has a 40-year right of first refusal over the use of Diego Garcia "on the same terms as may be offered to any third State or third party".

Diego Garcia. Under the treaty Mauritius authorises the United Kingdom to exercise its sovereign rights over the island and a 12-nautical-mile zone around it for an initial 99 years.

Under Annex 1 the United Kingdom has on Diego Garcia "unrestricted access, basing and overflight" for British and American aircraft and vessels, and unrestricted control over armed operations, weapons, personnel and the electromagnetic spectrum. It must "expeditiously inform Mauritius of any armed attack on a third State directly emanating from the Base on Diego Garcia", which the government said would be done "after the event". Elsewhere in the archipelago the two states decide jointly on the use of the spectrum, on the presence of other states' security forces and on any installation between 12 and 24 nautical miles from Diego Garcia; beyond that zone, and before any development of the outer islands, Mauritius must carry out a "Security Review" in which the United Kingdom may make submissions.

Under Article 11 and an exchange of letters, the United Kingdom pays "in consideration of this Agreement" £165 million a year for the first three years and £120 million a year for years four to thirteen, each later payment being the previous one adjusted for inflation by the UK GDP deflator; £40 million for a trust fund for Chagossians; and a development grant of £45 million a year for 25 years. The treaty "constitutes the full and final settlement of all claims by Mauritius in relation to the Chagos Archipelago". The government put the average cost at £101 million a year in 2025/26 prices, a net present value of £3.4 billion.

Article 6 provides that Mauritius "is free to implement a programme of resettlement on the islands of the Chagos Archipelago other than Diego Garcia". The House of Lords International Agreements Committee called it "in substance declaratory", adding: "It does not secure the right to return of the Chagossian community." The United Kingdom is to help Mauritius establish its own marine protected area, and Mauritius is to represent the archipelago at the International Telecommunication Union under an arrangement allowing the United Kingdom to register and keep the base's frequency assignments.

A Joint Commission, whose decisions require the agreement of both parties and to which the United States may send a representative, oversees the treaty, and disputes are to be "settled exclusively by negotiations". Mauritius may terminate the treaty only for non-payment, or for an armed attack or threat of armed attack on Mauritius by the United Kingdom, or an armed attack on Mauritius "directly emanating from the Base on Diego Garcia", subject to arbitration; the treaty makes no provision for the United Kingdom to terminate it. The treaty enters into force on the first day of the month after the parties notify each other that their internal procedures are complete.

=== Ratification and status (2025–2026) ===
The treaty was laid before Parliament on 22 May 2025 under the Constitutional Reform and Governance Act 2010; no resolution against ratification was passed in the 21 sitting days allowed, and on 30 June the House of Lords rejected a Conservative motion against ratification by 205 votes to 185. Because the government does not ratify treaties before they can be implemented in domestic law, the Diego Garcia Military Base and British Indian Ocean Territory Bill was introduced on 15 July 2025 to end British sovereignty when the treaty entered into force, revoke the territory's 2004 constitution and amend nationality law. The Commons passed it by 330 votes to 179 at second reading and by 320 to 171 at third reading, in September and October 2025. The Lords added six amendments, among them provisions delaying the bill's main sections until the government had sought a treaty change to stop the payments if military use of the base became impossible, and until a referendum of Chagossians on guaranteeing their rights to resettlement and to involvement in the trust fund; on 20 January 2026 the Commons rejected all but one. The bill was then removed from the Lords order paper after the Conservatives tabled an amendment calling for a pause "in light of the changing geopolitical circumstances".

Donald Trump receiving Keir Starmer at the White House on 27 February 2025, when he said he would be "inclined to go along" with the agreement; in January 2026 he called the transfer "an act of GREAT STUPIDITY".

On 20 January 2026 Trump wrote on Truth Social that "The UK giving away extremely important land is an act of GREAT STUPIDITY", linking it to his wish to acquire Greenland. On 17 February the State Department said that the United States "supports the decision of the United Kingdom to proceed with its agreement with Mauritius". British media then reported, citing government sources, that Starmer had refused a US request to use Diego Garcia and RAF Fairford for any pre-emptive strike on Iran, which according to The Times the government feared "would be a breach of international law". On 18 February Trump wrote that Starmer was "making a big mistake", adding: "DO NOT GIVE AWAY DIEGO GARCIA!" According to The Hill, The Times reported that the refusal was the basis of his renewed criticism, and The Daily Telegraph wrote on 2 March that "The row over Diego Garcia led the president to withdraw his support" for the treaty.

On 25 February the Foreign Office minister Hamish Falconer told the Commons: "We are pausing for discussions with our American counterparts." On 13 April the minister Stephen Doughty said that the US President's position "appears to have changed in recent weeks", making it "impossible to agree at political level" an update to the 1966 UK–US exchange of notes on the defence use of the territory, which he described as "necessary to ratify the treaty". The bill lapsed at the end of the parliamentary session on 29 April and was not included in the King's Speech in May. Andy Burnham, who succeeded Starmer as prime minister in July, said on 21 September: "The assurance I gave was I will work towards a resolution." The next day Trump told him that he expected him to reconsider the "terrible deal", and the Defence Secretary, Wes Streeting, said that Britain would not "at this stage" make the agreed payments. On 13 October the government told the House of Lords that "an agreement with Mauritius must protect UK interests and command US support", and: "We will return to the Bill in due course." On 23 October the House of Lords gave a second reading to a private member's bill introduced by Lord Weir of Ballyholme, which would restrict any transfer of sovereignty "without the approval of Parliament and without the consent of the Chagossian people"; the government opposed it, rejecting "the Bill's call for a referendum". On 27 October the Foreign Secretary, Ed Miliband, told the Commons that "under this US Administration, we will not get consent for the current arrangements", but that the government continued "to work with the US and Mauritius to safeguard our security interests". Burnham and Ramgoolam met during the leaders' retreat at the Commonwealth Heads of Government Meeting in Antigua on 4 November 2026; according to Downing Street they agreed "to work on a shared plan to make further progress by the end of the year", and Ramgoolam's office said that he had stressed the need for a clear roadmap with a first deadline in December 2026. Returning from the summit, Burnham told The Economist that the government was in discussion with the United States "to see how we might recast the arrangement that better meets their concerns", and said of the agreement reached over Greenland: "maybe there is something there we can take from that".

Mauritius approved a bill to set up the trust fund, with a Chagossian-majority board, in December 2025. In March 2026 Ramgoolam said that his government was "exploring legal avenues" because of the delay; in September the foreign minister, Dhananjay Ramful, told the General Assembly that Mauritian sovereignty was "non-negotiable", and Ramgoolam travelled to London for talks with Powell, by then the National Security Adviser. As of November 2026 the treaty had been signed but had not entered into force.

=== Legal challenges ===
Pompe's claim was joined with one issued in June 2025 by Louis Michel Mandarin and his son Misley Mandarin; both argued that the government had acted unlawfully in failing to consult Chagossians before agreeing to transfer sovereignty. On 10 March 2026 Mrs Justice Stacey refused permission for judicial review. She acknowledged "a long and shameful history" in the islanders' treatment, but held that the claims were in substance a challenge to the prerogative power to make treaties, which was not justiciable, and that there was no duty to consult because "the Chagossians have never had any right of abode or settlement on the Islands since their ancestors were first brought there". The claimants' lawyers said that they would challenge the decision in the Court of Appeal. In June 2025 Pompe and Bernadette Dugasse, both born in the archipelago, asked the UN Human Rights Committee to examine the treaty, alleging that it breached the International Covenant on Civil and Political Rights. The litigation that followed the landing on Île du Coin is described below.

== Chagossian perspectives ==
The British government estimated in 2022 that there were about 10,000 Chagossians in the United Kingdom, Mauritius and Seychelles, some 3,000 of them in Crawley, West Sussex. That year it opened a free route to British citizenship for the descendants of Chagossians born in the islands, and by 2025 Crawley's Chagossian community numbered about 3,500. Chagossians were divided over the treaty.

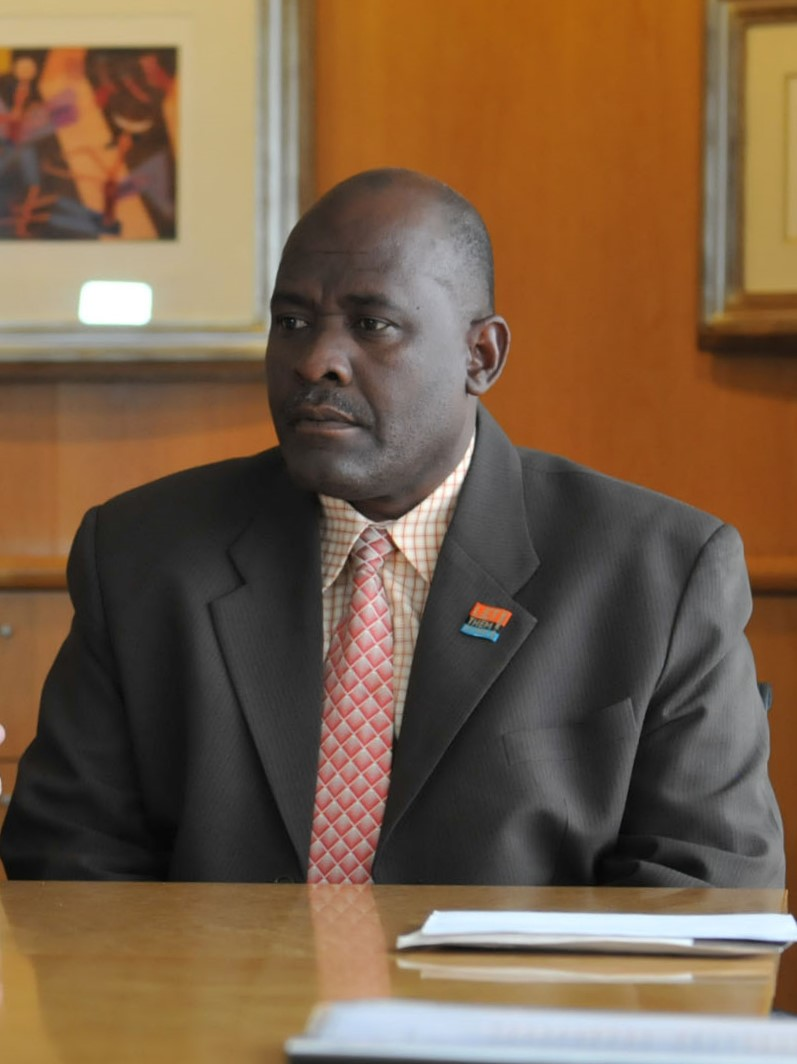
Olivier Bancoult, leader of the Chagos Refugees Group, in 2013. He called the signing of the treaty "a historic day for us".

The Chagos Refugees Group, based at Pointe aux Sables in Mauritius, supported the agreement because it allowed resettlement; its leader, Olivier Bancoult, said: "How could I oppose that even if it is not 100 percent satisfactory?" He called the signing "a historic day for us". In November 2025 he named three groups in Britain and the Seychelles Chagossians Community as supporting the implementing bill, and three groups as opposing it: Chagos Asylum People, Chagossian Voices and BIOT Citizens. After ratification stalled he said: "International law is squarely on our side."

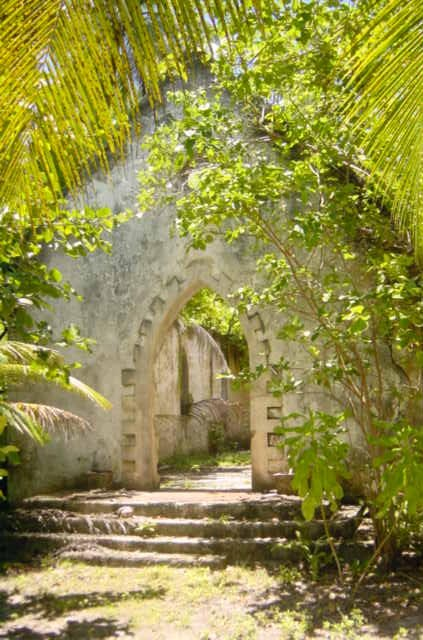
The abandoned church on Boddam Island, Salomon Atoll, in 2008. Article 6 of the treaty leaves Mauritius free to implement a resettlement programme on the islands other than Diego Garcia.

Frankie Bontemps of Chagossian Voices, a British-based group, said: "People are discussing the future of our homeland without us", adding: "We feel voiceless, powerless". Claudette Lefade of Chagos Asylum People sought self-determination under the British flag, fearing that Chagossians would fare worse under Mauritian rule. Misley Mandarin, the founder of BIOT Citizens, said that no agreement could be concluded without consulting the Chagossians and called for a referendum, and Peter Lamb, the MP for Crawley, said that the principle of self-determination had been ignored. Bancoult questioned the opponents' standing, saying that most of them had been born in Mauritius rather than on the islands. UN special rapporteurs, who said that the treaty "appears to be at variance with the Chagossians' right to return", and the Committee on the Elimination of Racial Discrimination, which objected that it "explicitly prevents the return of the Chagossian people to their ancestral lands in Diego Garcia Island", called for its ratification to be suspended; the British government said that the rapporteurs' views were not binding.

In December 2025 a poll of Chagossians in Britain organised by the Great British PAC, to which about 1,300 people responded, chose Mandarin as "first minister" of a "government-in-exile", formed to oppose the transfer by Chagossians who said that they wished to remain British citizens. Asked whether the government recognised it, Falconer said that he was "not familiar with the Government in exile in any great detail", and the Mauritian Attorney General, Gavin Glover, contested its legitimacy.

=== Île du Coin ===
Peros Banhos atoll from the International Space Station in 2014 (left), and the location of Île du Coin within it (right). Mandarin and three other Chagossians landed on the island on 16 February 2026.

On 16 February 2026 Mandarin and three other Chagossians, accompanied by the former Conservative MP Adam Holloway, landed without permits on Île du Coin in Peros Banhos, intending to establish a permanent settlement that they hoped would complicate the transfer. The voyage was backed by the Great British PAC, which BBC News described as "a right-wing British political pressure group", and The Independent reported that it was funded by "Reform's biggest donor", Christopher Harborne. The Foreign Office called the landing an "illegal, unsafe stunt", and Glover a "publicity stunt".

After removal notices were served, the territory's Chief Justice, James Lewis, granted an injunction against the group's removal on 19 February. In a judgment of 31 March 2026 he quashed section 9 of the British Indian Ocean Territory (Constitution) Order 2004, under which "no person has the right of abode in the Territory", as "an unlawful and irrational exercise of the prerogative". From Article 6 of the treaty he concluded that "there is no defence or national security concerns anymore against repopulating the outer islands by Chagossians". He also quashed the removal notices as procedurally unfair, but held that the claimants were on the island illegally and that "Nothing in this decision creates a right for the Claimants to set up a permanent camp on the Ile du Coin without the necessary permits". The effect of the decision was stayed pending the BIOT Commissioner's appeal, which the territory's Court of Appeal heard on 15–17 July 2026. On 4 November the court gave notice that it would hand down judgment on 12 November 2026. Six Chagossians were still living on the island in September 2026.

== Debate over the agreement ==
=== Arguments for the agreement ===
The British government's central argument was that the legal position of the base was under threat; at the signing Starmer said: "We had to act now… Because the base was under threat." He said that "The courts have already made decisions which undermine our position", and that if Mauritius went to court again the United Kingdom "would not have a realistic prospect of success" and "would likely face a Provisional Measures Order within a matter of weeks". The government's published legal position said that the ICJ's advisory opinion "carries significant weight" and was likely to be "highly influential" on any court whose judgment would be binding, noting that the ITLOS special chamber had relied on it in 2021, and that "A judgment from such a tribunal would be legally binding on the UK."

A US Air Force B-2 bomber landing at Diego Garcia, April 2025

Ministers argued that other states and international bodies would act on such rulings: Starmer said that if British control of the electromagnetic spectrum were put in doubt, "We would lose the first line of defence against other countries who wish to interfere and disrupt this capability". The Defence Secretary, John Healey, said that "anyone who would abandon this deal, would abandon this base", and the government cited the treaty's "24 nautical mile buffer zone" and "a strict ban on foreign security forces on the outer islands". The Lords International Agreements Committee, while calling the treaty "not perfect", concluded that if it were not ratified "Mauritius is likely to resume its campaign through international courts", putting the base "at greater risk".

Supporters pointed to international backing: the government said that "all Five Eyes partners" and India supported the agreement, and Canada, Australia, New Zealand, Japan and the African Union expressed support. India welcomed the treaty as "a milestone achievement" marking "the culmination of the process of decolonisation of Mauritius", and the African Union Commission also welcomed it. On cost, Starmer argued that paying for bases was normal practice ("We pay for our other military bases. Allies like the US and France do the same"), and said that the cost "will be less than cost of running one aircraft carrier for a year".

=== Criticism ===
The Conservatives and Reform UK opposed the treaty. After the political agreement of October 2024 the former prime minister Boris Johnson called the transfer "completely the wrong thing to do", attributing it to "sheer political correctness". Badenoch called it a "surrender", and the Conservatives argued that its "true cost" was £35 billion, the nominal total of the payments. Calculations by the Government Actuary's Department, released under a freedom of information request, gave three totals over 99 years: £34.7 billion in cash terms, about £10 billion in 2025/26 prices, and £3.4 billion as a net present value. Fact-checkers explained the difference: the PA news agency noted that the indexed payment would rise to "around £800 million a year in the last few years of the deal", but that "£800 million 95 years from now will not be worth the same as £800 million today", and Ben Zaranko of the Institute for Fiscal Studies told Full Fact: "Neither is unambiguously right or wrong: it depends on the question at hand". The shadow minister Wendy Morton said that the payments might be "potentially funding tax cuts in Mauritius".

Critics in Britain and the United States argued that Mauritius's relations with China could endanger the base; the Conservative Robert Jenrick called the deal "a strategic disaster for Britain", and US Senator Jim Risch said that it "gives in to Chinese lawfare and yields to pressure from unaccountable international institutions". Johnson had written in his newspaper column in September 2023, during the negotiations, that a future Mauritian government "might also close the base or allow the Chinese, at the right price, to build their own runways on the same archipelago"; Foreign Office officials replied that the government was working in "lockstep" with the United States. In a Senate floor speech on 21 January 2025, the US senator John Kennedy said that the United Nations was telling the United Kingdom, "which acquired the Chagos Islands from France", to "give them back to this island down here, Mauritius, over 1,000 miles away". (France had ceded Mauritius and its dependencies, including the archipelago, to the United Kingdom in 1814, and the archipelago was administered as a dependency of Mauritius until its detachment in 1965; see § British dependency of Mauritius (1814–1965) and § Detachment of the Chagos Archipelago (1965).) Kennedy said that "China is circling Mauritius" and "trying to be Mauritius' best friend", and that a base handed to Mauritius "eventually will end up in the hands of the Communist Party of China". Ramgoolam called such claims a "disinformation campaign", said that "Mauritius is aligned with India, not China", and insisted that he would not allow China to take control of the islands. In April 2026 the shadow foreign secretary, Priti Patel, said that Mauritius was "deepening its partnerships with Russia, China and Iran". In June 2026, after The Daily Telegraph described Mauritius as an ally of China and Iran, the Mauritian authorities rejected the description, saying that Mauritius belonged to no alliance bloc, and Ramful accused the newspaper of trying to make the agreement fail.

Opponents also disputed that the treaty was legally necessary: Badenoch said that there had been no binding judgment against the United Kingdom and that "no court has the jurisdiction to make one", and the shadow defence secretary, James Cartlidge, called the government's fears "overblown". In February 2026 Conservative MPs argued that Healey's warning of imminent binding rulings had overlooked article 298 of the United Nations Convention on the Law of the Sea, which in Cartlidge's words "provides an opt-out for binding rulings in relation to 'military activities'", and Cartlidge said that Healey "may have inadvertently misled the House"; Falconer replied that this was "a particularly complex and contentious area of law" and undertook that the government would write to members.

Several opponents called for a referendum of Chagossians, and an amendment by Nigel Farage and others for a referendum on sovereignty was not selected in the Commons. In the Lords the Conservative peer Baroness Meyer cited the referendums held in the Falkland Islands and Gibraltar; the Foreign Office minister Baroness Chapman replied that, according to successive governments and to domestic and international courts, "there is no right to self-determination therefore there is no legal entitlement to a referendum". The International Agreements Committee recorded that Sir Christopher Greenwood and Philippe Sands had both "underlined" that "as international law currently stands the Chagossians have no independent right to self-determination as distinct from the colonial unit of Mauritius and Chagos", and the ICJ had said that the right of self-determination "is defined by reference to the entirety of a non-self-governing territory".

== Timeline ==
The following tables list the main events in the dispute in chronological order.

=== Before 1965 ===
Timeline of the dispute before 1965
Date	Event
16th century	Portuguese seafarers charted the Chagos Archipelago and named it and some of its atolls; it appeared on Portuguese charts as early as 1538 but remained largely untouched.
1744	France claimed Peros Banhos, the first step in a progressive French claim to and survey of the archipelago, which France administered as a dependency of Île de France (Mauritius).
1783	Pierre Marie Le Normand, a planter from Île de France, obtained approval for a concession to settle Diego Garcia; the 22 enslaved Africans he brought there were probably the archipelago's first permanent inhabitants, and coconut plantations worked by enslaved labourers soon spread to other islands.
1810	British forces captured Île de France, which was renamed Mauritius.
30 May 1814	By the Treaty of Paris, France ceded Île de France and all its dependencies, including the Chagos Archipelago, to the United Kingdom, which administered the archipelago as a dependency of the colony of Mauritius until 1965.
1835	Slavery was abolished in Mauritius and its dependencies, freeing the enslaved workers of the Chagos plantations, most of whom had been brought from Mozambique and Madagascar.
1903	Seychelles, until then a dependency of Mauritius, became a separate colony; the Chagos Archipelago remained one of the Lesser Dependencies of Mauritius.
14 December 1960	The UN General Assembly adopted resolution 1514 (XV), the Declaration on the Granting of Independence to Colonial Countries and Peoples, which declares any attempt to disrupt the national unity and territorial integrity of a country incompatible with the UN Charter.
25–27 February 1964	At talks in London on American defence interests in the Indian Ocean, the United States sought a communications facility on Diego Garcia, and British officials undertook to recommend that the administration of the archipelago be transferred from Mauritius and that Britain acquire the land and resettle the population.
6 May 1964	British ministers approved the proposals in principle, but decided that the authorities in Mauritius and Seychelles should be told of the proposed detachment only later and in general terms.
29 June 1964	The Governor of Mauritius, Sir John Rennie, raised the idea of detaching the archipelago with the Premier, Seewoosagur Ramgoolam, who was favourably disposed to providing facilities but preferred a long-term lease.
July–August 1964	A joint Anglo-American team surveyed the archipelago and several islands of Seychelles; its British member, Robert Newton, reported that the civilian population of islands required for military purposes could be removed and resettled.

=== Detachment, independence and expulsion (1965–1976) ===
Timeline of the dispute, 1965–1976
Date	Event
23 September 1965	According to the British record of their meeting at 10 Downing Street, the Prime Minister, Harold Wilson, told Ramgoolam that he and his colleagues could return to Mauritius "either with Independence or without it", and that Diego Garcia could be detached by Order in Council or with their agreement.
23 September 1965	Later the same day, at Lancaster House, Ramgoolam and two other Mauritian ministers agreed in principle to the detachment of the archipelago in return for undertakings that included £3 million in compensation and the return of the islands to Mauritius when no longer needed for defence.
24 September 1965	On the last day of the constitutional conference in London, the British government announced that Mauritius would become independent.
5 November 1965	The Mauritius Council of Ministers confirmed its agreement to detachment on the conditions set out at Lancaster House; the ministers of the Parti Mauricien Social Démocrate dissented.
8 November 1965	The British Indian Ocean Territory Order 1965 detached the archipelago from Mauritius and combined it with Aldabra, Farquhar and Desroches, detached from Seychelles, to form a new colony, the British Indian Ocean Territory (BIOT).
16 December 1965	The General Assembly adopted resolution 2066 (XX) by 89 votes to none, with 18 abstentions, inviting the United Kingdom "to take no action which would dismember the Territory of Mauritius and violate its territorial integrity".
20 December 1966	Resolution 2232 (XXI), on a group of territories including Mauritius, was adopted by 93 votes to none, with 24 abstentions; it reiterated that disrupting the territorial integrity of colonial territories and establishing military bases in them was incompatible with the UN Charter.
30 December 1966	The United Kingdom and the United States concluded an exchange of notes making the BIOT available for the defence purposes of both governments for an initial 50 years; an Agreed Minute of the same date listed "resettling any inhabitants" among the British administrative measures.
3 April 1967	The Chagos Agalega Company sold its land on Diego Garcia, Peros Banhos, the Salomon Islands and other islands to the Crown for £660,000.
1967–1968	The depopulation of the archipelago began: islanders who had travelled to Mauritius on leave, at the end of their contracts or for medical treatment were refused passage home.
7 August 1967	Parties favouring independence won the Mauritian general election.
19 December 1967	Resolution 2357 (XXII), adopted by 86 votes to none, with 27 abstentions, reaffirmed the declaration made in resolution 2232 (XXI).
12 March 1968	Mauritius became independent; its constitution defined the country as the territories that had made up the colony immediately before independence, which did not include the archipelago.
24 April 1968	The General Assembly admitted Mauritius to the United Nations. (Note: The advisory opinion of the International Court of Justice gives the date as 26 April 1968; General Assembly resolution 2371 (XXII), which admitted Mauritius, is dated 24 April 1968.)
26 April 1969	Wilson agreed to the Foreign Secretary's proposal that the government should "aim at the return of the inhabitants of the whole Chagos Archipelago to the Seychelles and Mauritius".
16 April 1971	The BIOT Commissioner enacted the Immigration Ordinance 1971, making it unlawful to enter or remain in the territory without a permit and allowing the removal of anyone there unlawfully.
July–October 1971	After the BIOT Administrator announced in January that Diego Garcia would be closed, its inhabitants were removed, mainly in July and September, to Peros Banhos, Salomon, Seychelles and Mauritius; the evacuation was completed on 31 October.
4 September 1972	Mauritius accepted £650,000 in full and final discharge of the British undertaking of 1965 to meet the cost of resettling people displaced from the archipelago; the money was paid in March 1973.
24 October 1972	A UK–US exchange of notes approved in principle the construction of a limited US naval communications facility on Diego Garcia.
1972–1973	As the plantations on Salomon and Peros Banhos ran down, their inhabitants were shipped to Mauritius; Salomon closed in 1972, and the last ship left Peros Banhos on 26 May 1973, reaching Port Louis on 13 June with the last of the population.
February 1975	Michel Vencatessen, a former resident of the archipelago, sued the British government for damages for intimidation, deprivation of liberty and assault in connection with his removal in 1971.
25 February 1976	The Diego Garcia Agreement 1976 approved the development of the facility into a support facility of the United States Navy, its use other than in normal circumstances to be a matter for the joint decision of the two governments.
29 June 1976	Aldabra, Farquhar and Desroches were returned to Seychelles on its independence, leaving the Chagos Archipelago as the whole of the BIOT. (Note: By an exchange of notes of 22 June 1976, the United Kingdom and the United States removed the three islands from their 1966 agreement with effect from 28 June 1976.)

=== Claim and litigation (1980–2016) ===
Timeline of the dispute, 1980–2016
Date	Event
July 1980	The Organisation of African Unity adopted a resolution demanding that Diego Garcia be "unconditionally returned to Mauritius".
9 October 1980	Having generally not raised the question in public since independence, Mauritius, through its Prime Minister, told the General Assembly that the BIOT should be disbanded and the territory restored to Mauritius.
7 July 1982	The United Kingdom and Mauritius agreed that the United Kingdom would pay £4 million, ex gratia and without admission of liability, in full and final settlement of the claims of the islanders who had gone to Mauritius.
7 July 1982	The Mauritian Parliament amended the Interpretation and General Clauses Act to include "the Chagos Archipelago, including Diego Garcia" in the legal definition of Mauritius.
1 June 1983	The Mauritian Parliament's Select Committee on the Excision of the Chagos Archipelago, set up in July 1982, published a report that criticised the detachment and the pre-independence Mauritian government's handling of it, and identified a "blackmail element" in the way the United Kingdom had presented it.
1992	The Constitution of Mauritius, as amended with effect from 1992, defined Mauritius as including the Chagos Archipelago and Diego Garcia.
3 November 2000	In Bancoult (No 1), brought by the Chagossian Olivier Bancoult, the High Court quashed the provision of the 1971 Ordinance excluding the islanders; the government did not appeal, and its Immigration Ordinance 2000, made the same day, allowed Chagossians to enter and live on the islands other than Diego Garcia.
25 January 2001	Mauritius proposed that the two states refer the sovereignty dispute to the International Court of Justice; the United Kingdom did not agree.
10 June 2004	Two Orders in Council made under the royal prerogative, the British Indian Ocean Territory (Constitution) Order 2004 and the British Indian Ocean Territory (Immigration) Order 2004, declared that no person had the right of abode in the territory and restored immigration control over all the islands.
July 2004	After Mauritius indicated that it was prepared to leave the Commonwealth in order to bring the dispute before the International Court of Justice, the United Kingdom amended its acceptance of the court's compulsory jurisdiction to exclude disputes with states that are or have been Commonwealth members.
11 May 2006	In Bancoult (No 2), the Divisional Court quashed section 9 of the 2004 Constitution Order, which denied any right of abode; the Court of Appeal dismissed the government's appeal on 23 May 2007.
22 October 2008	The House of Lords allowed the government's appeal by three votes to two, upholding the 2004 Orders.
1 April 2010	The United Kingdom declared a marine protected area around the archipelago.
20 December 2010	Mauritius began arbitration proceedings against the United Kingdom under the United Nations Convention on the Law of the Sea, challenging the marine protected area (Mauritius v United Kingdom).
11 December 2012	The European Court of Human Rights declared inadmissible an application by 1,786 Chagossians, partly because their claims had been settled under the 1982 agreement (Chagos Islanders v United Kingdom).
18 March 2015	The arbitral tribunal in Mauritius v United Kingdom held that it had no jurisdiction over the dispute about sovereignty, but that the United Kingdom had breached the Convention in declaring the marine protected area and that its undertaking to return the archipelago when no longer needed for defence was legally binding.
24 June 2016	After Mauritius announced that it would seek an advisory opinion from the International Court of Justice, the British High Commission and the US Embassy in Port Louis warned in a joint press statement that a referral "would cause lasting damage to Mauritius' bilateral relations with both the UK and the USA"; the Mauritian Prime Minister's Office replied that Mauritius considered the threat "hostile and totally unacceptable".
29 June 2016	The Supreme Court refused, by three votes to two, Bancoult's application to set aside the 2008 decision on the ground that documents about a 2002 feasibility study on resettlement had not been disclosed.
16 November 2016	The British government decided against resettling the Chagossians "on the grounds of feasibility, defence and security interests, and cost to the British taxpayer", announced a support package of about £40 million, and confirmed that the defence agreements with the United States would continue until 30 December 2036.

=== International proceedings (2017–2023) ===
Timeline of the dispute, 2017–2023
Date	Event
22 June 2017	The General Assembly adopted resolution 71/292 by 94 votes to 15, with 65 abstentions, requesting an advisory opinion from the International Court of Justice on the separation of the archipelago from Mauritius. (Note: Paragraph 53 of the advisory opinion gives the date as 23 June 2017; the resolution itself and paragraph 1 of the opinion give 22 June 2017.)
8 February 2018	In Bancoult (No 3), the Supreme Court dismissed, by five votes to two, a challenge to the marine protected area, while holding a leaked US embassy cable admissible in evidence.
3–6 September 2018	The International Court of Justice held public hearings, at which 22 states and the African Union made oral statements.
25 February 2019	In its advisory opinion, the court found, by 13 votes to 1, that the decolonisation of Mauritius had not been lawfully completed in 1968 and that the United Kingdom was under an obligation to end its administration of the archipelago "as rapidly as possible".
22 May 2019	The General Assembly adopted resolution 73/295 by 116 votes to 6, with 56 abstentions, affirming that the archipelago "forms an integral part of the territory of Mauritius" and demanding that the United Kingdom withdraw its colonial administration within six months.
18 June 2019	Mauritius began proceedings against the Maldives to delimit their maritime boundary; on 24 September the two states transferred the case to a special chamber of the International Tribunal for the Law of the Sea (Mauritius/Maldives).
22 November 2019	The six-month period set by resolution 73/295 ended without the United Kingdom withdrawing; the British government maintained that the advisory opinion was not legally binding.
20 February 2020	The UN Secretariat's revised world map No. 4170 (Rev. 18.1), dated 20 February 2020, changed the designation of the archipelago in line with resolution 73/295; the Mauritian government said that it depicted the archipelago as Mauritian territory.
28 January 2021	The special chamber rejected the Maldives' preliminary objections, holding that Mauritius "can be regarded as the coastal State in respect of the Chagos Archipelago" for the purpose of the delimitation.
August 2021	The congress of the Universal Postal Union voted, by 77 to 6 with 41 abstentions, to acknowledge the archipelago as part of Mauritius and to stop registering, distributing or forwarding stamps issued by the "British Indian Ocean Territory".
26 November 2021	The Mauritian National Assembly passed the Criminal Code (Amendment) Act 2021, which makes it an offence, punishable by up to ten years' imprisonment, to produce or distribute on behalf of a foreign state stamps, coins, official maps or other documents that misrepresent Mauritian sovereignty over any part of its territory.
14 February 2022	During a Mauritian survey of Blenheim Reef, officials accompanied by exiled Chagossians raised the Mauritian flag on Peros Banhos; the British Foreign Office said that the United Kingdom did not recognise Mauritius's claim.
28 April 2023	The special chamber unanimously fixed a single maritime boundary between the Maldives and Mauritius within 200 nautical miles, but declined to delimit the continental shelf beyond that limit.

=== Negotiations and the 2025 agreement (2022–2026) ===
Timeline of the dispute, 2022–2026
Date	Event
3 November 2022	Following a meeting at the UN General Assembly between the prime ministers Liz Truss and Pravind Jugnauth, the Foreign Secretary, James Cleverly, announced that the United Kingdom and Mauritius would begin negotiations on the exercise of sovereignty over the archipelago.
3 October 2024	The two governments announced a political agreement under which the United Kingdom would agree that Mauritius is sovereign over the archipelago, including Diego Garcia, and would be authorised to exercise Mauritius's sovereign rights over Diego Garcia for an initial 99 years; the US President, Joe Biden, applauded the agreement.
November 2024	Navin Ramgoolam replaced Pravind Jugnauth as Prime Minister of Mauritius after a general election, and later called his predecessor's draft agreement a "sellout" and renegotiated its financial terms and the conditions for extending the lease.
27 February 2025	Receiving the British Prime Minister, Keir Starmer, at the White House, President Donald Trump said that he was "inclined to go along with" the British deal.
22 May 2025	After an out-of-hours injunction obtained by a Chagossian, Bertrice Pompe, was discharged around noon, Starmer and Ramgoolam signed the Agreement concerning the Chagos Archipelago including Diego Garcia, under which the United Kingdom accepts that Mauritius is sovereign over the whole archipelago, including Diego Garcia, and Mauritius authorises the United Kingdom to exercise sovereign rights over Diego Garcia for an initial 99 years.
22 May 2025	The US State Department welcomed the treaty, and the Secretary of State, Marco Rubio, said that it secured the long-term operation of the joint military facility on Diego Garcia.
30 June 2025	The House of Lords rejected, by 205 votes to 185, a Conservative motion calling on the government not to ratify the treaty.
9 September 2025	The House of Commons gave the implementing Diego Garcia Military Base and British Indian Ocean Territory Bill a second reading by 330 votes to 179.
20 October 2025	The Commons passed the bill at third reading by 320 votes to 171.
28 October 2025	The Mauritian National Assembly repealed section 76B of the Criminal Code, the sovereignty offence created in 2021; the British government said that no one had been prosecuted under it.
December 2025	Chagossians in the United Kingdom opposed to the transfer formed a "government-in-exile" and, after a poll to which about 1,300 responded, chose Misley Mandarin as interim "first minister" (Chagossian Government-in-Exile).
20 January 2026	The Commons rejected five of the six amendments made to the bill by the Lords; the same day Trump wrote on Truth Social that the transfer was "an act of GREAT STUPIDITY".
16 February 2026	Four Chagossians led by Mandarin, accompanied by the former MP Adam Holloway, landed on Île du Coin in Peros Banhos in protest against the transfer.
18 February 2026	The territory's immigration officer issued removal notices to the four.
18 February 2026	A day after the State Department had said that the United States supported the British decision to proceed with the agreement, Trump wrote on Truth Social that Starmer was "making a big mistake".
19 February 2026	The territory's Chief Justice, James Lewis, granted an interim injunction preventing their removal.
25 February 2026	Answering an urgent question, the Foreign Office minister Hamish Falconer told the Commons: "We are pausing for discussions with our American counterparts."
February 2026	Mauritius suspended diplomatic relations with the Maldives, which had said that it no longer recognised Mauritian sovereignty over the archipelago and objected to the treaty.
10 March 2026	The High Court refused permission for judicial review in R (Pompe), holding that the challenge to the government's failure to consult Chagossians before agreeing the treaty was not justiciable.
31 March 2026	In R (Mandarin), the territory's Supreme Court quashed section 9 of the 2004 Constitution Order and the removal notices, staying its orders pending an appeal.
13 April 2026	The minister Stephen Doughty told the Commons that a change in the US President's position had made it "impossible to agree at political level" an update to the 1966 exchange of notes needed for ratification, and that the bill could not complete its passage in the session.
29 April 2026	The parliamentary session ended and the bill made no further progress.
15–17 July 2026	The BIOT Court of Appeal, sitting in London, heard the Commissioner's appeal in the Mandarin case.
21–23 September 2026	Starmer's successor, Andy Burnham, said that he would "work towards a resolution"; after Trump said at their meeting on 22 September that he expected Burnham to reconsider the "terrible deal", the Defence Secretary, Wes Streeting, said that the United Kingdom would not make the agreed payments "at this stage".
13 October 2026	A Foreign Office minister told the House of Lords that an agreement with Mauritius "must protect UK interests and command US support" and that the government would "return to the Bill in due course".
23 October 2026	The House of Lords gave a second reading, against government opposition, to Lord Weir of Ballyholme's private member's bill to restrict any transfer of sovereignty "without the approval of Parliament and without the consent of the Chagossian people".
27 October 2026	The Foreign Secretary, Ed Miliband, told the Commons that "under this US Administration, we will not get consent for the current arrangements".
4 November 2026	Burnham and Ramgoolam met at the Commonwealth Heads of Government Meeting in Antigua and agreed "to work on a shared plan to make further progress by the end of the year"; the next day Burnham said that he wanted to "recast the arrangement" to meet American concerns.

== See also ==
- Mauritius–United Kingdom relations
- Mauritius–United States relations
- List of territorial disputes
- List of sovereign states and dependent territories in the Indian Ocean

== Sources ==
=== Court and tribunal decisions ===
- Written Statement of the African Union (PDF). International Court of Justice. 1 March 2018.
- Written Statement of Argentina (PDF). International Court of Justice. 1 March 2018.
- Written Statement of Australia (PDF). International Court of Justice. 27 February 2018.
- R v Secretary of State for the Foreign and Commonwealth Office, ex parte Bancoult, EWHC (Admin) 413 (High Court (Divisional Court) 3 November 2000).
- R (Bancoult) v Secretary of State for Foreign and Commonwealth Affairs, EWCA Civ 498 (Court of Appeal 23 May 2007).
- R (Bancoult) v Secretary of State for Foreign and Commonwealth Affairs, EWHC (Admin) 1038 (High Court (Divisional Court) 11 May 2006).
- R (Bancoult) v Secretary of State for Foreign and Commonwealth Affairs (No 2), UKHL 61 (House of Lords 22 October 2008).
- R (Bancoult) v Secretary of State for Foreign and Commonwealth Affairs, EWCA Civ 708 (Court of Appeal 23 May 2014).
- R (Bancoult) v Secretary of State for Foreign and Commonwealth Affairs, EWHC (Admin) 1502 (High Court (Divisional Court) 11 June 2013).
- R (Bancoult No 3) v Secretary of State for Foreign and Commonwealth Affairs, UKSC 3 (Supreme Court 8 February 2018).
- R (Bancoult No 2) v Secretary of State for Foreign and Commonwealth Affairs, UKSC 35 (Supreme Court 29 June 2016).
- Bancoult v. McNamara, 445 F.3d 427 (D.C. Cir. 21 April 2006).
- Written Statement of Belize (PDF). International Court of Justice. 30 January 2018.
- "Cause list, 15–17 July 2026: HM Commissioner for the British Indian Ocean Territory v The King (on the application of Mandarin & Ors), [2026] BIOT CA (Civ) 1" (PDF). British Indian Ocean Territory Court of Appeal. 2026.
- "Notice of judgment hand down: His Majesty's Commissioner for the British Indian Ocean Territory v The King (on the application of Mandarin & Ors), [2026] BIOT CA (Civ) 1" (PDF). British Indian Ocean Territory Court of Appeal. 4 November 2026.
- Written Statement of Brazil (PDF). International Court of Justice. 1 March 2018.
- Chagos Islanders v Attorney General and HM BIOT Commissioner, EWCA Civ 997 (Court of Appeal 22 July 2004).
- Chagos Islanders v Attorney General and HM BIOT Commissioner, EWHC (QB) 2222 (High Court 9 October 2003).
- Chagos Islanders v United Kingdom, Application no. 35622/04 (European Court of Human Rights 11 December 2012).
- Written Statement of Chile (PDF). International Court of Justice. 28 February 2018.
- Written Statement of the People's Republic of China (PDF). International Court of Justice. 1 March 2018.
- "Bancoult v. McNamara, 1:01-cv-02629 (D.D.C.)". CourtListener. Free Law Project.
- International Court of Justice (4 September 2018). Verbatim record CR 2018/23: public sitting held on Tuesday 4 September 2018, at 3 p.m. (PDF) (Report). International Court of Justice.
- International Court of Justice (5 September 2018). Verbatim record CR 2018/24: public sitting held on Wednesday 5 September 2018, at 10 a.m. (uncorrected) (PDF) (Report). International Court of Justice.
- International Court of Justice (5 September 2018). Verbatim record CR 2018/25: public sitting held on Wednesday 5 September 2018, at 3 p.m. (PDF) (Report). International Court of Justice.
- International Court of Justice (6 September 2018). Verbatim record CR 2018/26: public sitting held on Thursday 6 September 2018, at 10.40 a.m. (PDF) (Report). International Court of Justice.
- International Court of Justice (6 September 2018). Verbatim record CR 2018/27: public sitting held on Thursday 6 September 2018, at 3 p.m. (uncorrected) (PDF) (Report). International Court of Justice.
- Written Statement of Cuba (PDF). International Court of Justice. 28 February 2018.
- Written Statement of Djibouti (PDF). International Court of Justice. 1 March 2018.
- Donoghue, Joan (25 February 2019). "Dissenting opinion of Judge Donoghue" (PDF). Legal Consequences of the Separation of the Chagos Archipelago from Mauritius in 1965, Advisory Opinion. I.C.J. Reports 2019. International Court of Justice. p. 261.
- Written Statement of France (English translation by the Registry) (PDF). International Court of Justice. 28 February 2018.
- Written Statement of Germany (PDF). International Court of Justice. 15 January 2018.
- Gevorgian, Kirill (25 February 2019). "Declaration of Judge Gevorgian" (PDF). Legal Consequences of the Separation of the Chagos Archipelago from Mauritius in 1965, Advisory Opinion. I.C.J. Reports 2019. International Court of Justice. p. 335.
- Written Statement of Guatemala (PDF). International Court of Justice. 1 March 2018.
- R (Hoareau and Bancoult) v Secretary of State for Foreign and Commonwealth Affairs, EWCA Civ 1010 (Court of Appeal 30 July 2020).
- R (Hoareau and Bancoult) v Secretary of State for Foreign and Commonwealth Affairs, EWHC (Admin) 221 (High Court (Divisional Court) 8 February 2019).
- R (Horeau and others) v Secretary of State for Foreign and Commonwealth Affairs, EWHC (Admin) 2102 (High Court 12 August 2016).
- Legal Consequences of the Separation of the Chagos Archipelago from Mauritius in 1965, Advisory Opinion (PDF). I.C.J. Reports 2019. International Court of Justice. 25 February 2019. p. 95.
- Written Statement of India (PDF). International Court of Justice. 28 February 2018.
- Written Statement of Israel (PDF). International Court of Justice. 27 February 2018.
- Dispute concerning delimitation of the maritime boundary between Mauritius and Maldives in the Indian Ocean (Mauritius/Maldives), Judgment (PDF). International Tribunal for the Law of the Sea. 28 April 2023.
- Dispute concerning delimitation of the maritime boundary between Mauritius and Maldives in the Indian Ocean (Mauritius/Maldives), Preliminary Objections, Judgment (PDF). ITLOS Reports 2020–2021. International Tribunal for the Law of the Sea. 28 January 2021. p. 17.
- Kateka, James; Wolfrum, Rüdiger (18 March 2015). Dissenting and Concurring Opinion of Judge James Kateka and Judge Rüdiger Wolfrum. Permanent Court of Arbitration.
- Written Statement of Lesotho (PDF). International Court of Justice. 1 March 2018.
- Written Statement of Liechtenstein (PDF). International Court of Justice. 20 February 2018.
- Written Statement of Madagascar (English translation by the Registry) (PDF). International Court of Justice. 28 February 2018.
- R (Mandarin and others) v HM Commissioner for the British Indian Ocean Territory: Order (Supreme Court of the British Indian Ocean Territory 31 March 2026), Text.
- R (Mandarin and others) v HM Commissioner for the British Indian Ocean Territory (Supreme Court of the British Indian Ocean Territory 31 March 2026), Text.
- Memorial of the Republic of Mauritius. Vol. I. Permanent Court of Arbitration. 1 August 2012.
- Written Comments of the Republic of Mauritius (PDF). Vol. I. International Court of Justice. 15 May 2018.
- Reference to Chagos Archipelago in Annual Statements made by Mauritius to the United Nations General Assembly (PDF). Written Statement of the Republic of Mauritius, Annex 100. International Court of Justice. 1 March 2018.
- Written Statement of the Republic of Mauritius (PDF). Vol. I. International Court of Justice. 1 March 2018.
- Written Statement of Namibia (PDF). International Court of Justice. 1 March 2018.
- Written Statement of the Netherlands (PDF). International Court of Justice. 27 February 2018.
- Written Statement of Nicaragua (PDF). International Court of Justice. 1 March 2018.
- Written Statement of Niger (English translation by the Registry) (PDF). International Court of Justice. 6 March 2018.
- Oxman, Bernard H. (28 January 2021). Separate and Dissenting Opinion of Judge ad hoc Oxman (PDF). International Tribunal for the Law of the Sea.
- In the Matter of the Chagos Marine Protected Area Arbitration (Mauritius v. United Kingdom): Award (PDF). Permanent Court of Arbitration. 18 March 2015.
- R (Pompe) v Secretary of State for Foreign, Commonwealth and Development Affairs; R (Mandarin) v Secretary of State for Foreign, Commonwealth and Development Affairs, EWHC (Admin) 529 (High Court 10 March 2026).
- Written Statement of the Republic of Korea (PDF). International Court of Justice. 28 February 2018.
- Robinson, Patrick (25 February 2019). "Separate opinion of Judge Robinson" (PDF). Legal Consequences of the Separation of the Chagos Archipelago from Mauritius in 1965, Advisory Opinion. I.C.J. Reports 2019. International Court of Justice. p. 294.
- Written Statement of the Russian Federation (PDF). International Court of Justice. 27 February 2018.
- Written Statement of Serbia (PDF). International Court of Justice. 27 February 2018.
- Written Comments of the Republic of Seychelles (PDF). International Court of Justice. 15 May 2018.
- Written Statement of South Africa (PDF). International Court of Justice. 1 March 2018.
- Special Committee on the Situation with regard to the Implementation of the Declaration on the Granting of Independence to Colonial Countries and Peoples (11 October 1967). Report of the Special Committee (A/6700/Add.8) (PDF) (Report). United Nations – via Written Statement of Mauritius, Annex 92.
- "Docket No. 06-502: Bancoult v. McNamara". Supreme Court of the United States. 16 January 2007. Certiorari denied, 549 U.S. 1166 (2007).
- Tomka, Peter (25 February 2019). "Declaration of Judge Tomka" (PDF). Legal Consequences of the Separation of the Chagos Archipelago from Mauritius in 1965, Advisory Opinion. I.C.J. Reports 2019. International Court of Justice. p. 148.
- Written Statement of the United Kingdom (PDF). International Court of Justice. 15 February 2018.
- Written Statement of the United States of America (PDF). International Court of Justice. 1 March 2018.
- Written Statement of Viet Nam (PDF). International Court of Justice. 1 March 2018.

=== United Nations documents ===
- Committee on the Elimination of Racial Discrimination (2 December 2025). Decision 1 (2025): Mauritius and the United Kingdom (early warning and urgent action procedure, INT/CERD/EWU/11263), advance unedited version (Report). Office of the United Nations High Commissioner for Human Rights.
- Legal Counsel of the Food and Agriculture Organization of the United Nations (6 May 2022). Note in relation to agenda item 4 of the 26th Session of the Indian Ocean Tuna Commission: "Clarification of the Status of the United Kingdom's Membership in the IOTC" (IOTC-2022-S26-12) (PDF) (Report). Archived (PDF) from the original on 23 June 2025.
- "Agreement between Mauritius and the UK fails to guarantee rights of Chagossians, say UN experts" (Press release). Office of the United Nations High Commissioner for Human Rights. 10 June 2025.
- Permanent Mission of the United Kingdom to the United Nations (19 January 2023). Note No. 004/23 to the Secretary-General, with the Written Ministerial Statement of 3 November 2022 (PDF) (Report). United Nations.
- United Nations General Assembly (16 December 1965). "2066 (XX). Question of Mauritius". Resolutions adopted by the General Assembly during its twentieth session. Official Records of the General Assembly, Twentieth Session, Supplement No. 14 (A/6014) – via Memorial of Mauritius, Annex 38.
- United Nations Secretary-General (18 May 2020). Advisory opinion of the International Court of Justice on the legal consequences of the separation of the Chagos Archipelago from Mauritius in 1965: Report of the Secretary-General (A/74/834) (Report). United Nations.
- "Declarations recognizing as compulsory the jurisdiction of the International Court of Justice under Article 36, paragraph 2, of the Statute of the Court". United Nations Treaty Collection. United Nations.
- United Nations General Assembly (16 December 1965). Official Records, Twentieth Session, 1398th plenary meeting, 16 December 1965 (A/PV.1398) (Report). United Nations.
- United Nations General Assembly (20 December 1966). Official Records, Twenty-first Session, 1500th plenary meeting, 20 December 1966 (A/PV.1500) (Report). United Nations.
- United Nations General Assembly (19 December 1967). Official Records, Twenty-second Session, 1641st plenary meeting, 19 December 1967 (A/PV.1641) (Report). United Nations.
- United Nations General Assembly (24 April 1968). Official Records, Twenty-second Session, 1643rd plenary meeting, 24 April 1968 (A/PV.1643) (Report). United Nations.
- United Nations General Assembly (22 June 2017). Official Records, Seventy-first session, 88th plenary meeting, Thursday, 22 June 2017 (A/71/PV.88) (Report). United Nations.
- United Nations General Assembly (22 May 2019). Official Records, Seventy-third session, 83rd plenary meeting, Wednesday, 22 May 2019, 10 a.m. (A/73/PV.83) (Report). United Nations.
- United Nations General Assembly (22 May 2019). Official Records, Seventy-third session, 84th plenary meeting, Wednesday, 22 May 2019, 3 p.m. (A/73/PV.84) (Report). United Nations.
- United Nations General Assembly (19 December 1967). Resolution 2357 (XXII). Question of American Samoa, Antigua, Bahamas, Bermuda, British Virgin Islands, Cayman Islands, Cocos (Keeling) Islands, Dominica, Gilbert and Ellice Islands, Grenada, Guam, Mauritius, Montserrat, New Hebrides, Niue, Pitcairn, St. Helena, St. Kitts-Nevis-Anguilla, St. Lucia, St. Vincent, Seychelles, Solomon Islands, Swaziland, Tokelau Islands, Turks and Caicos Islands and the United States Virgin Islands (Report). General Assembly Official Records, Twenty-second Session, Supplement No. 16 (A/6716). United Nations.
- United Nations General Assembly (24 April 1968). Resolution 2371 (XXII). Admission of Mauritius to membership in the United Nations (Report). United Nations.
- United Nations General Assembly (22 June 2017). Resolution adopted by the General Assembly on 22 June 2017: 71/292. Request for an advisory opinion of the International Court of Justice on the legal consequences of the separation of the Chagos Archipelago from Mauritius in 1965 (A/RES/71/292) (Report). United Nations.
- United Nations General Assembly (24 May 2019). Resolution adopted by the General Assembly on 22 May 2019: 73/295. Advisory opinion of the International Court of Justice on the legal consequences of the separation of the Chagos Archipelago from Mauritius in 1965 (A/RES/73/295) (Report). United Nations.
- "Press release: UPU adopts UN resolution on Chagos Archipelago" (Press release). Universal Postal Union. 27 August 2021. Archived from the original on 26 February 2025.

=== Treaties and official documents ===
- "Chairperson of the AUC applauds historic Agreement between Mauritius & the United Kingdom recognising Mauritius sovereignty over Chagos Archipelago, including Diego Garcia" (Press release). African Union Commission. 3 October 2024.
- "Press Statement by H.E. Mahmoud Ali Youssouf, Chairperson of the African Union Commission on the Agreement Between the United Kingdom and the Republic of Mauritius on the Chagos Archipelago and the Establishment of a Strategic Partnership Framework" (Press release). African Union Commission. 23 May 2025.
- Memorandum of U.K./U.S. London Discussions: U.S. Defence Interests in the Indian Ocean (PDF). 27 February 1964. TNA FCO 31/3437 – via ICJ Annex 25.
- Prime Minister's Office (Mauritius) (12 December 2025). Highlights of Cabinet Meeting – Friday 12 December 2025 (PDF) (Report). Government of Mauritius.
- "PM meetings with world leaders at CHOGM" (Press release). Prime Minister's Office, 10 Downing Street. 5 November 2026.
- Anelay, Joyce (13 July 2016). "Written question HL941, tabled 4 July 2016". UK Parliament: Written questions, answers and statements.
- Minutes of Anglo-US Talks on the Indian Ocean held on 7 November 1975 (extract) (PDF). British Embassy, Washington. November 1975 – via Memorial of Mauritius, Annex 76.
- Biden, Joe (3 October 2024). "Statement on the Agreement Between Mauritius and the United Kingdom on the Status of the Chagos Archipelago". The American Presidency Project.
- Anglo/US Consultations on the Indian Ocean: November 1975, Agenda Item III, Brief No. 4: Future of Aldabra, Farquhar and Desroches (PDF). Foreign and Commonwealth Office. November 1975 – via Memorial of Mauritius, Annex 75.
- Brown, Thomas (30 October 2025). Diego Garcia Military Base and British Indian Ocean Territory Bill (HL Bill 139 of 2024–26) (Report). Library Briefing LLN-2025-0040. House of Lords Library.
- Cameron, David (23 February 2015). "European Council". Hansard, House of Commons.
- Colonial Office Telegram No. 198 to Mauritius, No. 219 to Seychelles (PDF). 19 July 1965. TNA FO 371/184526 – via Memorial of Mauritius, Annex 10.
- Lords Amendments: Diego Garcia Military Base and British Indian Ocean Territory Bill (Decisions on Motions relating to Lords Amendments) (PDF) (Report). House of Commons. 20 January 2026.
- "Diego Garcia Military Base and British Indian Ocean Territory Bill: Second Reading (Division 287)". UK Parliament. 9 September 2025.
- "Diego Garcia Military Base and British Indian Ocean Territory Bill: Third Reading (Division 318)". UK Parliament. 20 October 2025.
- Kennedy, John (21 January 2025). "Chagos Islands". Congressional Record. 171 (12): S269–S270.
- "The Criminal Code (Amendment) Act 2021 (Act No. 17 of 2021)" (PDF). National Assembly of Mauritius. 29 November 2021. Archived (PDF) from the original on 31 July 2024.
- U.S. Defence Interests in the Indian Ocean: Memorandum by the Foreign Office, the Colonial Office and the Ministry of Defence, D.O.(O)(64)23 (PDF). Cabinet, Defence and Oversea Policy (Official) Committee. 23 April 1964. TNA FCO 31/3437 – via ICJ Annex 26.
- Duncan, Alan (16 November 2016). "Update on the British Indian Ocean Territory (HCWS260)". UK Parliament: Written questions, answers and statements.
- Duncan, Alan (30 April 2019). "British Indian Ocean Territory (HCWS1528)". UK Parliament: Written questions, answers and statements.
- "Repeal of section 76B of the Mauritian Criminal Code by the National Assembly in Mauritius". GOV.UK. Foreign, Commonwealth and Development Office. 30 October 2025.
- Fairclough, A. J. (22 May 1967). Minute from A. J. Fairclough, Colonial Office, to a Minister of State, with a Draft Minute for the Secretary of State for Commonwealth Affairs addressed to the Foreign Secretary (PDF). TNA FCO 16/226 – via Memorial of Mauritius, Annex 49.
- House of Commons Foreign Affairs Committee (9 January 2024). Oral evidence: Work of the Foreign, Commonwealth and Development Office, HC 325 (witnesses: Lord Cameron and Sir Philip Barton) (Report). House of Commons.
- "Chagos Archipelago depicted as Mauritian territory by new UN world map" (Press release). Government Information Service, Government of Mauritius. 25 May 2020.
- Greenwood, Anthony (5 November 1965). Minute from the Secretary of State for the Colonies to the Prime Minister (PDF). TNA FO 371/184529 – via Memorial of Mauritius, Annex 26.
- "Chagossians: Trust Fund and Resettlement". Hansard, House of Commons. 16 December 2025.
- "Diego Garcia and British Indian Ocean Territory". Hansard, House of Commons. 25 February 2026.
- "Diego Garcia Military Base and British Indian Ocean Territory Bill". Hansard, House of Commons. 13 April 2026.
- "King's Speech". Hansard, House of Lords. 18 May 2026.
- "Diego Garcia Military Base and British Indian Ocean Territory Bill". Hansard, House of Lords. 13 October 2026.
- "Topical Questions". Hansard, House of Commons. 27 October 2026.
- "British Sovereignty Protection (Chagos Islands) Bill [HL]". Hansard, House of Lords. 23 October 2026.
- "Diego Garcia Military Base and British Indian Ocean Territory Bill". Hansard, House of Lords. 5 January 2026.
- "British Indian Ocean Territory (HCWS90)". UK Parliament: Written questions, answers and statements. 5 November 2019.
- Heads of Agreement between the Government of the United Kingdom, the Administration of the British Indian Ocean Territory and the Government of Seychelles concerning the Return of Aldabra, Desroches and Farquhar to Seychelles to be Executed on Independence Day (PDF). 18 March 1976. TNA FCO 40/732 – via Memorial of Mauritius, Annex 79.
- Healey, John (22 May 2025). Defence Secretary oral statement on Diego Garcia (Speech). House of Commons.
- Hunt, John (14 July 1975). British Indian Ocean Territory: The Ex-Seychelles Islands (OPD(75)23): briefing note to the Prime Minister (PDF). TNA PREM 16/2264 – via Memorial of Mauritius, Annex 73.
- House of Lords International Agreements Committee (25 June 2025). UK-Mauritius Agreement on the Chagos Archipelago including Diego Garcia (PDF) (Report). 9th Report of Session 2024–26, HL Paper 146. House of Lords.
- Indian Ocean Tuna Commission (2022). Report of the 26th Session of the Indian Ocean Tuna Commission, Seychelles, 16–20 May 2022 (IOTC-2022-S26-R) (PDF) (Report).
- Indian Ocean Tuna Commission (2025). Report of the 29th Session of the Indian Ocean Tuna Commission, Réunion, 13–17 April 2025 (IOTC-2025-S29-R) (PDF) (Report).
- Johnson, Boris (15 May 2018). "Commonwealth: Diplomatic Relations". Hansard, House of Commons.
- Lammy, David (7 October 2024). Foreign Secretary's statement on the Chagos Islands, 7 October 2024 (Speech). House of Commons. Archived from the original on 13 February 2025.
- Loft, Philip; Curtis, John (8 September 2025). 2025 treaty on the British Indian Ocean Territory/Chagos Archipelago (Report). Research Briefing CBP-10273. House of Commons Library.
- Diego Garcia Military Base and British Indian Ocean Territory Bill: Lords Amendments (Bill 364) (PDF) (Report). House of Commons. 13 January 2026.
- "Statement on Agreement between the United Kingdom and Mauritius regarding return of Mauritian sovereignty over Chagos Archipelago" (Press release). Ministry of External Affairs, Government of India. 3 October 2024 – via GlobalSecurity.org.
- NAM Summit Declaration, New Delhi, 7–12 March 1983 (extract) (PDF). Non-Aligned Movement. March 1983 – via Written Statement of Mauritius, Annex 21.
- National Assembly of Mauritius (4 February 2025). Parliamentary Debates (Hansard), Eighth National Assembly, First Session, No. 02 of 2025 (unrevised): Tuesday 4 February 2025 (Report). Archived from the original on 19 March 2025.
- Parliamentary Debates (Hansard), Sixth National Assembly, First Session, Debate No. 07 of 2016 (revised): Tuesday 17 May 2016 (Report). National Assembly of Mauritius. 17 May 2016.
- Newton, Robert (1964). Report on the Anglo-American Survey in the Indian Ocean (PDF) (Report). TNA CO 1036/1332 – via Memorial of Mauritius, Annex 2.
- Note for the Prime Minister's Meeting with Sir Seewoosagur Ramgoolam, Premier of Mauritius, with covering note by the Private Secretary and minute by the Colonial Secretary (PDF). Colonial Office. 22 September 1965. TNA PREM 13/3320 – via Memorial of Mauritius, Annex 17.
- Resolution on the Diego Garcia, AHG/Res. 99 (XVII) (PDF). Organisation of African Unity, Assembly of Heads of State and Government. July 1980 – via Written Statement of Mauritius, Annex 118.
- Minutes of a Meeting held at 10 Downing Street on Tuesday, 31st August, 1965, OPD(65) 37th Meeting (PDF). Cabinet, Defence and Oversea Policy Committee. 31 August 1965. TNA CAB 148/18 – via ICJ Annex 51.
- Defence Facilities in the Indian Ocean: Memorandum by the Deputy Secretary of State for Defence and the Parliamentary Under-Secretary of State for Foreign Affairs, OPD(65)124 (PDF). Cabinet, Defence and Oversea Policy Committee. 26 August 1965 – via ICJ Annex 48.
- Defence Interests in the Indian Ocean: Legal Status of Chagos, Aldabra, Desroches and Farquhar – Note by the Secretary of State for the Colonies, OPD(65)73 (PDF). Cabinet, Defence and Oversea Policy Committee. 27 April 1965 – via ICJ Annex 32.
- British Indian Ocean Territory: The Ex-Seychelles Islands – Memorandum by the Secretary of State for Foreign and Commonwealth Affairs, OPD(75)23 (PDF). Cabinet, Defence and Oversea Policy Committee. 4 July 1975. TNA FCO 40/674 – via Memorial of Mauritius, Annex 72.
- "Communique: Meeting between the Rt Hon Prime Minister and Senior Officials from the UK and the US on Chagos Archipelago" (PDF) (Press release). Prime Minister's Office, Republic of Mauritius. 24 June 2016 – via ION News.
- Rammell, Bill (15 June 2004). "British Indian Ocean Territory (written ministerial statement)". Hansard, House of Commons. pp. 32WS–34WS.
- Record of a Conversation between the Prime Minister and the Premier of Mauritius, Sir Seewoosagur Ramgoolam, at No. 10, Downing Street, at 10 a.m. on Thursday, 23 September 1965 (PDF). 23 September 1965. TNA FO 371/184528 – via Memorial of Mauritius, Annex 18.
- Rowlands, Ted (15 March 1976). Letter from the Parliamentary Under-Secretary of State, Foreign and Commonwealth Office, to the Mauritius High Commissioner, London (PDF). TNA FCO 40/732 – via Memorial of Mauritius, Annex 78.
- Starmer, Keir (22 May 2025). PM's remarks at press conference on Diego Garcia: 22 May 2025 (Speech). London.
- "UK secures future of vital Diego Garcia Military Base to protect national security" (Press release). Ministry of Defence and Foreign, Commonwealth and Development Office. 22 May 2025.
- United Kingdom Mission to the United Nations (16 November 1965). Telegram No. 2972 to the Foreign Office (PDF) (Report) – via Memorial of Mauritius, Annex 36.
- "Diego Garcia Military Base and British Indian Ocean Territory Bill: Stages". UK Parliament.
- "British Sovereignty Protection (Chagos Islands) Bill [HL]: Stages". UK Parliament.
- Agreement between the Government of the United Kingdom of Great Britain and Northern Ireland and the Government of the Republic of Mauritius concerning the Chagos Archipelago including Diego Garcia (CS Mauritius No.1/2025, CP 1334) (Report). Foreign, Commonwealth and Development Office. 22 May 2025.
- "UK and Mauritius joint statement, 3 October 2024" (Press release). Foreign, Commonwealth and Development Office. 3 October 2024.
- "Joint Press Statement from the British High Commission and the Embassy of the United States of America" (PDF) (Press release). British High Commission Port Louis; Embassy of the United States of America, Port Louis. 24 June 2016 – via ION News.
- Exchange of notes constituting an agreement supplementing the above-mentioned agreement, concerning a United States naval support facility on Diego Garcia, British Indian Ocean Territory and replacing the supplementary agreement of 24 October 1972. London, 25 February 1976 (PDF). United Nations Treaty Series. Vol. 1018. United Nations. 1976. pp. 372–381.
- Exchange of notes constituting an agreement amending the above-mentioned agreement, as supplemented. London, 22 June 1976 (PDF). United Nations Treaty Series. Vol. 1032. United Nations. 1977. pp. 323–324.
- Exchange of notes constituting an agreement between the Government of the United Kingdom of Great Britain and Northern Ireland and the Government of the United States of America concerning the availability for defence purposes of the British Indian Ocean Territory. London, 30 December 1966 (No. 8737) (PDF). United Nations Treaty Series. Vol. 603. United Nations. 1967. pp. 273–290. Also published as UK Treaty Series No. 15 (1967), Cmnd 3231; 18 UST 28; TIAS 6196.
- Exchange of notes constituting an agreement supplementing the above-mentioned agreement concerning a limited United States naval communications facility on Diego Garcia, British Indian Ocean Territory. London, 24 October 1972 (PDF). United Nations Treaty Series. Vol. 866. United Nations. 1973. pp. 302–307.
- "U.S. Support for UK and Mauritius Agreement On Chagos Archipelago" (Press release). United States Department of State. 22 May 2025 – via AllAfrica.
- "United States and Mauritius to Hold Bilateral Security Discussions" (Press release). United States Department of State. 17 February 2026. Archived from the original on 8 July 2026.
- Disposition of the Seychelles Islands of the BIOT (PDF). Office of International Security Operations, Bureau of Politico-Military Affairs, United States Department of State. 31 October 1975 – via Memorial of Mauritius, Annex 74.
- Office of the Chief of Naval Operations (1970). "39. Paper Prepared in the Office of the Chief of Naval Operations (Moorer): Diego Garcia—Background and Status, 11 February 1970". Foreign Relations of the United States, 1969–1976, Volume XXIV, Middle East Region and Arabian Peninsula, 1969–1972; Jordan, September 1970. Office of the Historian, United States Department of State.
- Waitzman, Eren (26 June 2025). "UK-Mauritius treaty on the Chagos Archipelago". House of Lords Library. UK Parliament.

=== Books and journals ===
- Edis, Richard (1993). Peak of Limuria: The Story of Diego Garcia (PDF). London: Bellew Publishing. ISBN 1-85725-070-2 – via Written Statement of the Republic of Mauritius (ICJ), vol. IV, Annex 136 (extracts).
- Hendry, Ian; Dickson, Susan (2011). British Overseas Territories Law (PDF). Oxford: Hart Publishing – via Written Statement of the Republic of Mauritius (ICJ), vol. V, Annex 157.
- Vine, David (2009). Island of Shame: The Secret History of the U.S. Military Base on Diego Garcia (PDF). Princeton University Press. ISBN 978-0-691-13869-5 – via Written Statement of the Republic of Mauritius (ICJ), vol. V, Annex 151 (extracts).

=== News and other sources ===
- AFP (18 February 2026). "Chagos islanders say they refuse to leave in protest against UK handover". Arab News.
- "India welcomes UK-Mauritius treaty on Chagos". Akashvani News. All India Radio. 23 May 2025.
- Arjanee, Ameerah (2 October 2026). "UK-Mauritius Chagos sovereignty deal stalls amid fears of further delays". Al Jazeera English.
- Kunda, James (28 February 2026). "Mauritius suspends diplomatic ties with Maldives". Anadolu Agency.
- "India advocates amicable solution on Diego Garcia". The Asian Age. 21 January 2017.
- Badshah, Nadeem (17 February 2026). "Four Chagossians return to islands in attempt to stop British transfer to Mauritius". The Guardian.
- "British stamps banned from Chagos Islands in Indian Ocean". BBC News. 25 August 2021. Archived from the original on 26 August 2021.
- "Deportation of Chagos Islanders blocked by judge". BBC News. 19 February 2026.
- Bowcott, Owen (1 May 2019). "Corbyn condemns May's defiance of Chagos Islands ruling". The Guardian.
- Brams, Sophie (21 February 2026). "Pentagon blocked from using UK bases in potential Iran strike". The Hill.
- Courea, Eleni (1 April 2025). "Donald Trump signs off UK's handover of Chagos Islands to Mauritius". The Guardian.
- Daly, Patrick (23 September 2023). "UK Foreign Office rejects Boris Johnson's Chagos Islands handover fears". BreakingNews.ie. PA Media.
- "Chagos : «La menace du Royaume-Uni et des États-Unis est hostile et inacceptable», dit SAJ". Defimedia.info (in French). Le Défi Media Group. 24 June 2016.
- "Dossier Chagos : tête-à-tête entre Navin Ramgoolam et son homologue britannique, Andy Burnham" [Chagos file: one-to-one meeting between Navin Ramgoolam and his British counterpart, Andy Burnham]. Le Défi Media (in French). 5 November 2026.
- Diver, Tony (5 June 2025). "Starmer's Chagos deal reported to UN human rights chiefs". The Daily Telegraph.
- Durrant, Will (6 October 2024). "Chagos Islands deal with Mauritius 'completely the wrong thing', says Johnson". The Irish News. PA Media.
- "Lords debate Chagos and self-determination". GBC News. Gibraltar Broadcasting Corporation. 7 January 2026.
- Hughes, David; Payne, Josh (27 February 2025). "President Trump 'inclined to go along with' PM's Chagos Islands deal". Express & Star. PA Media.
- "Government delays Chagos deal after opposition from Trump and Tories". ITV News. 23 January 2026 – via Yahoo News.
- "Ile Maurice: «Qui sont les plus légitimes ? Les déracinés ou les troisièmes générations nées au pays ?»". L'Express (in French). 8 November 2025 – via allAfrica.
- "Ile Maurice: Port-Louis rejette toute remise en question de sa souveraineté". L'Express (in French). 9 June 2026 – via allAfrica.
- "Ile Maurice: Navin Ramgoolam et Andy Burnham visent une feuille de route d'ici décembre" [Mauritius: Navin Ramgoolam and Andy Burnham aim for a roadmap by December]. L'Express (in French). 5 November 2026 – via allAfrica.
- Lateef, Samaan (21 January 2025). "Mauritius PM calls for closer ties with China, but insists he won't let Beijing take Chagos Islands". The Daily Telegraph.
- Lateef, Samaan (5 March 2026). "Mauritius to sue Britain over Chagos delay". The Daily Telegraph – via Yahoo News.
- Lawless, Jill (20 January 2026). "Trump slams UK deal to hand over Chagos Islands after he previously supported it". PBS News Hour. Associated Press.
- "Chagos : la revendication maldivienne ouvre un nouveau front diplomatique". Le Mauricien (in French). 14 September 2026.
- Lendon, Brad (20 February 2026). "Diego Garcia: Britain blocking use of air bases Trump says would be needed for strikes on Iran, UK media report". CNN.
- Lynch, David (14 February 2022). "UK 'in no doubt' over Chagos Islands after Mauritius plants flag". North Wales Live. PA Media.
- Lynch, David (5 November 2026). "Andy Burnham wants progress on Chagos Islands stalemate 'by the end of the year'". Express & Star. PA Media.
- Maddox, David (25 February 2026). "Was this the week Starmer's Chagos deal finally died?". The Independent.
- Maddox, David; Mitchell, Archie (11 June 2025). "United Nations experts call for Starmer's Chagos deal to be suspended". The Independent.
- Mallinder, Lorraine (11 February 2025). "'Tug of war': Chagos Islands deal tearing families apart in Mauritius". Al Jazeera English.
- Martin, Daniel (16 December 2025). "Chagos Islanders defy Starmer by forming government in exile". The Telegraph. Archived from the original on 17 December 2025.
- Nuckchhed, Vashish (17 July 2026). "Afrique: L'autodétermination au coeur des débats devant la Cour d'appel". L'Express (in French) – via allAfrica.
- Nuckchhed, Vashish (17 July 2026). "Chagos : L'autodétermination au cœur des débats devant la Cour d'appel". L'Express (in French).
- Ormiston, Simon (23 September 2026). "UK to review Chagos deal after Trump tells Burnham it is 'terrible'". Euronews.
- Ouitona, Maceo (19 December 2025). "Chagos : Port-Louis face à la fronde du « gouvernement en exil »". Afrik.com (in French).
- "Fact check: Government calculations set out three cost estimates for Chagos deal". Rutland Times. PA Media. 23 January 2026.
- Piper, Elizabeth (21 September 2026). "British PM Andy Burnham seeks resolution to dispute over Diego Garcia base". Reuters.
- Piper, Elizabeth; MacAskill, Andrew (15 January 2025). "Britain gives Trump team chance to review Chagos Islands deal". Reuters – via Yahoo News.
- "UK court lifts injunction, allowing Chagos Islands deal to proceed". Arab News. Reuters. 22 May 2025.
- "Britain issues removal orders to four who landed on Chagos atoll". Reuters. 18 February 2026.
- "UK court rejects challenge to Chagos Islands deal". Business Day. Reuters. 10 March 2026.
- Ridgwell, Henry (10 March 2025). "British plan to cede Chagos Islands sovereignty prompts concerns over China threat". Voice of America.
- Ronald, Issy (11 April 2026). "UK forced to halt Chagos Islands deal after Trump criticism". CNN.
- "Chagossian activists challenge legality of new bilateral agreement". Seychelles Nation. 10 June 2025.
- Stacey, Kiran; Crerar, Pippa (21 January 2026). "How Badenoch's meeting with Mike Johnson led to Trump's Chagos deal rant". The Guardian.
- Stacey, Kiran (5 November 2026). "Burnham wants to 'recast' Chagos Islands deal after US resistance". The Guardian.
- Stringer, Connor (2 March 2026). "Exclusive: Trump – I'm 'very disappointed' in Starmer over Iran". The Daily Telegraph – via Yahoo News.
- Syal, Rajeev (1 September 2022). "Evicted Chagos Islanders' descendants to get British citizenship". The Guardian.
- Thomas, Fernando (3 April 2025). "Accord sur les Chagos : Londres réaffirme son engagement, mais la diaspora reste divisée". Le Défi Media (in French).
- Thompson, George; James, Rhiannon (20 January 2026). "Labour MPs rebel over Chagos Islands deal following Trump criticism". The Independent – via Yahoo News.
- Thompson, Tony; Smith, Hannah (6 February 2026). "How much is the UK spending on the Chagos deal?". Full Fact.
- Townsend, Mark (26 January 2024). "Chagos islanders stunned as David Cameron rules out return". The Guardian.
