= British Indian Ocean Territory (Constitution) Order 2004 =

Constitution of the British Indian Ocean Territory

Queen in Council
- Territorial extent: British Indian Ocean Territory
- Enacted by: Elizabeth II, by Order in Council under the royal prerogative
- Enacted: 10 June 2004
- Commenced: 10 June 2004

Repeals
- British Indian Ocean Territory Orders 1976 to 1994

Related legislation
- British Indian Ocean Territory (Immigration) Order 2004

Related cases
- Bancoult (No 2) (2006–2008); R (Mandarin) v Commissioner (2026)

Keywords
- Right of abode, Chagossians, peace, order, and good government
- Status: In force

The British Indian Ocean Territory (Constitution) Order 2004 is the constitution of the British Indian Ocean Territory (BIOT), an Order in Council made by the Queen under the royal prerogative on 10 June 2004. It replaced the territory's earlier constitutional orders, provides for a Commissioner with power to make laws for the territory's "peace, order and good government", and by section 9 declares that "no person has the right of abode in the Territory". It was made on the same day as the British Indian Ocean Territory (Immigration) Order 2004, which forbids anyone to enter or be present in the territory without a permit. Together the two Orders reversed the position established in 2000, after Bancoult (No 1), under which Chagossians could live on the outer islands of the Chagos Archipelago.

The Orders were made without the concurrence of Parliament and announced in a written ministerial statement on 15 June 2004. Olivier Bancoult challenged them, and section 9 was quashed by the Divisional Court in 2006, a decision upheld by the Court of Appeal in 2007, but in 2008 the House of Lords held by three to two that the Constitution Order was open to judicial review but valid (Bancoult (No 2)). The Supreme Court refused in 2016 to set that decision aside.

On 31 March 2026 the Supreme Court of the British Indian Ocean Territory, in R (Mandarin) v Commissioner, quashed section 9 as "an unlawful and irrational exercise of the prerogative", but stayed the effect of its order pending the Commissioner's appeal, which the territory's Court of Appeal heard in July 2026; judgment was due on 12 November 2026. A bill to implement the 2025 treaty with Mauritius on the archipelago would have revoked the Order, but it lapsed in April 2026.

== Background ==
The British Indian Ocean Territory was created in 1965 by an order which detached the Chagos Archipelago from the colony of Mauritius and created the office of Commissioner, with power to "make laws for the peace, order and good government of the Territory". Its population was removed between 1968 and 1973. The Commissioner's Immigration Ordinance 1971 made it unlawful to enter or remain in the territory without a permit.

On 3 November 2000, in Bancoult (No 1), the Divisional Court held that the power to legislate for the "peace, order and good government" of the territory did not include a power to expel all its inhabitants, and quashed section 4 of the 1971 ordinance. The government did not appeal, and the same day the Commissioner made the Immigration Ordinance 2000, which exempted those who were British Dependent Territories citizens by virtue of a connection with the territory from the permit requirement, except on Diego Garcia. No one went to live on the islands. A feasibility study by independent experts concluded in July 2002 that while resettlement on a short-term subsistence basis was possible, long-term resettlement would be "precarious and costly".

According to Lord Hoffmann's account of the facts in the House of Lords, newspaper articles in Mauritius in 2004 suggested that Chagossians and their supporters were planning landings on the islands, the Foreign Office was advised that the possibility "should be taken seriously", and the United States informed the British government of its concern at any action which might compromise the security of Diego Garcia. The government, having decided in view of the feasibility report not to support resettlement, "therefore decided to restore full immigration control".

== Making of the Orders ==
The Constitution Order and the Immigration Order were made by the Queen in Council on 10 June 2004. The Constitution Order recites that it was made "by virtue and in exercise of all the powers in Her Majesty vested" and "by and with the advice of Her Privy Council". In the Divisional Court, Hooper LJ said that the source of the power was the royal prerogative and that "Neither Her Majesty nor the members of the Privy Council present that day (which, coincidentally, included me) considered the merits of the Order"; in reality, he said, the Order was that of the Foreign Secretary. The Court of Appeal noted that the Orders were made "a week before this court was to hear the application for permission to appeal" in the Chagossians' group action for compensation.

The Foreign Secretary, Jack Straw, explained to the chairman of the Commons Foreign Affairs Committee that the committee had not been shown the Constitution Order in draft because "we needed to preserve complete confidentiality if we were to avoid the risk of an attempt by the Chagossians to circumvent the Orders before they came into force." The Orders were announced on 15 June 2004 in a written statement by Bill Rammell, Parliamentary Under-Secretary of State at the Foreign Office, who cited the feasibility study and said:

In effect, therefore, anything other than short-term resettlement on a purely subsistence basis would be highly precarious and would involve expensive underwriting by the UK Government for an open-ended period—probably permanently. Accordingly, the Government consider that there would be no purpose in commissioning any further study into the feasibility of resettlement; and that it would be impossible for the Government to promote or even permit resettlement to take place. After long and careful consideration, we have therefore decided to legislate to prevent it.

He added that full immigration control was also necessary "to ensure and maintain the availability and effective use of the territory for defence purposes", especially in the light of "recent developments in the international security climate". The first Order, he said, made clear "as a principle of the constitution, that no person has the right of abode in the territory or has unrestricted access to any part of it", and the second contained the detailed immigration controls; together they "restore the legal position to what it had been understood to be before the High Court decision of 3 November 2000". He arranged for copies to be placed in the Library of the House. In a Commons debate on 7 July 2004 Rammell acknowledged that the decisions of the 1960s and 1970s to depopulate the islands "do not, to say the least, constitute the finest hour of UK foreign policy".

According to the legal researcher Ronan Cormacain, prerogative orders are not statutory instruments within the meaning of the Statutory Instruments Act 1946, and the 2004 annual volume of statutory instruments does not contain the Constitution Order. The territory's administration publishes the text on its website.

== Provisions ==
=== Constitution Order ===
The Order has fifteen sections and a Schedule. It came into force "forthwith", applies the Interpretation Act 1978 to its interpretation, and revokes the British Indian Ocean Territory Orders 1976 to 1994, while preserving laws, appointments and courts made or established under them. The Schedule defines the territory as Diego Garcia, Egmont or Six Islands, Peros Banhos, the Salomon Islands, the Three Brothers Islands, Nelson or Legour Island, the Eagle Islands and the Danger Islands. Its explanatory note states that "This Order makes new provision for the Constitution and administration of the British Indian Ocean Territory."

Commissioner. The Commissioner is appointed by the Crown "by instructions given through a Secretary of State" and holds office during the sovereign's pleasure; he may constitute offices and make appointments, grant pardons and respites in the sovereign's name, and make grants of land.

Section 9. Under the heading "No right of abode in the Territory", section 9 provides:

(1) Whereas the Territory was constituted and is set aside to be available for the defence purposes of the Government of the United Kingdom and the Government of the United States of America, no person has the right of abode in the Territory.
(2) Accordingly, no person is entitled to enter or be present in the Territory except as authorised by or under this Order or any other law for the time being in force in the Territory.

Legislation. Section 10(1) provides that "Subject to the provisions of this Order, the Commissioner may make laws for the peace, order and good government of the Territory." Section 10(2) declares that the Commissioner "may make any such provision as he considers expedient for or in connection with the administration of the Territory", and that no such provision is invalid except so far as it is inconsistent with the territory's status as a British overseas territory, with the Order or another Order in Council, or as otherwise provided by the Colonial Laws Validity Act 1865. The Commissioner's laws take effect on publication in the territory's Gazette, and any of them "may be disallowed by Her Majesty through a Secretary of State".

Courts. Courts existing under the earlier orders continue, and the territory's Supreme Court may, "as the Chief Justice may direct, sit in the United Kingdom and there exercise all or any of its powers or jurisdiction in any civil or criminal proceedings".

Reserved powers. Section 15(1) provides: "There is hereby reserved to Her Majesty full power to make laws for the peace, order and good government of the Territory". Section 15(2) states that such laws may be made "to give effect to section 9(1) and to secure compliance with section 9(2)", including provision for punishing unauthorised entry or presence, for removal, and for empowering officers to act "(including by the use of such force as is reasonable in the circumstances)"; references to preventing entry include the territorial sea. By section 15(4), "There is hereby reserved to Her Majesty full power to amend or revoke this Order."

=== Immigration Order ===
The British Indian Ocean Territory (Immigration) Order 2004, made the same day, repealed the Immigration Ordinance 2000. The Supreme Court of the territory later observed that it "largely reflected" the 1971 ordinance quashed in Bancoult (No 1). Section 5(1) provides: "No person shall enter the Territory or be present there unless he is in possession of a permit issued under section 7 or his name is endorsed on a permit under section 9." Members of the armed forces, public officers and officials of the British government on duty are exempt, and listed contractor personnel are deemed to hold permits.

An immigration officer, "acting in his entire discretion", may issue, renew or cancel a permit, which lasts up to four years. A person aggrieved by an officer's decision may appeal to the Commissioner, "whose decision shall be final and conclusive". The Commissioner or the Principal Immigration Officer may order the removal of anyone unlawfully present, and officers may direct vessels away from the territorial sea, seize vessels and use "reasonable force". Unlawful entry or presence is an offence punishable by up to three years' imprisonment, a fine of £3,000, or both; masters of vessels who fail to comply with requirements or directions under section 12 face up to three years' imprisonment, fines of up to £10,000, or both.

The British Indian Ocean Territory (Immigration) (Amendment) Order 2022, made on 12 October 2022 and to come into force on a day appointed by the Commissioner, replaces section 13 on the place of removal; its explanatory note states that it "removes the requirement for an individual to consent to their removal to a place other than the place from which they came or their country of nationality". The Orders in Council published by the territory's administration are the Constitution Order 2004, the Immigration Order 2004 and the 2022 amending order.

== Legal challenges ==
=== Bancoult (No 2), 2004–2008 ===
On 24 August 2004 Bancoult applied for judicial review to quash section 9 of the Constitution Order and the Immigration Order. The Divisional Court (Hooper LJ and Cresswell J) said that by the Constitution Order "The Chagossians were thus effectively exiled." On 11 May 2006 it held section 9 irrational because, made by the Queen in right of the territory, the Order was "on its face, not concerned with the interests of BIOT, but with the interests of the United Kingdom and of the United States". It called "repugnant" the suggestion that a minister could, by Order in Council, "exile a whole population from a British Overseas Territory" for its "peace, order and good government". It quashed section 9 and held that section 5(1) of the Immigration Order, "inextricably linked to section 9", could not require Chagossians to hold permits outside Diego Garcia.

The Court of Appeal dismissed the government's appeal on 23 May 2007. Sedley LJ held that "an Order in Council is an act of the executive", that the prerogative of colonial governance "enjoys no generic immunity from judicial review", and that the two Orders "negate one of the most fundamental liberties known to human beings, the freedom to return to one's homeland". He concluded that "both their content and the circumstances of their enactment constitute an abuse of power on the part of executive government". Waller LJ observed that "So far as Orders in Council are concerned there is simply no opportunity for debate at all and no opportunity for scrutiny."

On 22 October 2008 the House of Lords allowed the government's appeal by three to two. All five Law Lords held the Order reviewable; Lord Hoffmann said he saw "no reason why prerogative legislation should not be subject to review on ordinary principles of legality, rationality and procedural impropriety in the same way as any other executive action". For the majority, Lord Hoffmann held that "In a ceded colony, however, the Crown has plenary legislative authority. It can make or unmake the law of the land", that "The language of section 9 of the Constitution Order could hardly be clearer", and that the words "peace order and good government" have "never been construed as words limiting the power of a legislature". He found it "quite impossible to say" that the decision to reimpose immigration control "was unreasonable or an abuse of power". Lord Rodger held that whether such legislation conduced to peace, order and good government was not justiciable, noting that "orders in council are made without the concurrence of Parliament or of any other representative legislature and so the political control is less direct". Lord Carswell agreed with the majority.

In dissent, Lord Bingham said that Parliament could have legislated to the effect of section 9, "but not without public debate in Parliament and democratic decision", and concluded "that there was no royal prerogative power to make an order in council containing section 9, and it is accordingly void". Lord Mance wrote that "A constitution which exiles a territory's inhabitants is a contradiction in terms", and held that the prerogative "did not extend to enacting legislation aimed at depriving BIOT of its inhabitants' right to enter and be present there".

=== Later challenges, 2012–2020 ===
In 2012 the European Court of Human Rights declared inadmissible an application by 1,786 Chagossians, Chagos Islanders v United Kingdom. Rejecting an argument that the 2004 Orders had undone the unappealed judgment in Bancoult (No 1), it found that there had been "no re-opening or re-deciding of the validity of the 1971 immigration ordinance", and perceived "no appearance of depriving the applicants of the benefit of a final, enforceable decision".

In 2016 the Supreme Court refused by three to two to set aside the House of Lords' decision for non-disclosure of documents about the feasibility study (R (on the application of Bancoult (No 2)) v Secretary of State for Foreign and Commonwealth Affairs). Lord Mance noted a new feasibility study published in 2015 and said that "In practical terms, the background has shifted, and logically the constitutional ban needs to be revisited", recording counsel's acceptance that any Chagossian could challenge "the failure to abrogate the 2004 Orders". In R (Hoareau and Bancoult), a challenge to the government's 2016 decision against resettlement, the Divisional Court held that the government "was rationally entitled to take the view that, if resettlement should not take place, there was no need for, or any practical point in, revisiting the 2004 Orders", and the Court of Appeal held that there was no legal duty "to consider revoking the 2004 Orders as a freestanding issue".

=== R (Mandarin) v Commissioner, 2026 ===
In 2026 four Chagossians who had landed without permits on Île du Coin challenged removal notices issued under the Immigration Order in the Supreme Court of the British Indian Ocean Territory, and argued that section 9 was unlawful. The Chief Justice, James Lewis KC, held that the court had jurisdiction to consider the lawfulness of section 9, since the claimants faced enforcement under the territory's own laws, and that it was not bound by Bancoult (No 2). He held that the prerogative power to legislate for the territory "is subject to judicial review, that should not be in doubt", and that "The Constitutional Order 2004 is an exercise of the royal prerogative alone."

Agreeing with the speeches of Lord Bingham and Lord Mance, he held that the use of the prerogative to enact section 9 "was not permissible and it is therefore void", and that "A claimed power to exclude a whole population must be justified by legal source, not administrative necessity." Relying on Article 6 of the 2025 treaty with Mauritius, under which Mauritius "is free to implement a programme of resettlement" on the islands other than Diego Garcia, he held that it was no longer possible to say that the outer islands were required for the defence purposes recited in section 9, or that repopulation was not feasible on economic grounds. He concluded that section 9 "cannot stand and that it is an unlawful and irrational exercise of the prerogative and should be quashed".

The judge held that section 5 of the Immigration Order did not fall with section 9. In his conclusions he stated:

- "I quash and will declare that Section 9 of the Constitutional Order 2004 is unlawful and/or Wednesbury unreasonable, especially in light of the current circumstances."
- "The Claimants entered into the Territory illegally without a permit and are staying on the Ile du Coin illegally as they do not have a permit. Section 5 of the Immigration Order 2004 remains valid. Nothing in this decision creates a right for the Claimants to set up a permanent camp on the Ile du Coin without the necessary permits."
- "The Section 12 Removal Notices are quashed and need to be redetermined in the light of a fair procedure which includes the Claimants' representations."

The court's order of 31 March 2026 declared section 9 unlawful and quashed it, but granted the Commissioner permission to appeal and provided that "The effects of paragraphs (iii) to (vi) above are to be stayed pending final determination of the Defendant's appeal before the Court of Appeal." The appeal was listed before the British Indian Ocean Territory Court of Appeal for 15–17 July 2026, and was heard in London on those dates, the government's lawyers asking the court to annul the decision.

== Relationship to the 2025 treaty ==
Under the Diego Garcia Military Base and British Indian Ocean Territory Bill, introduced to implement the 2025 treaty by which the United Kingdom agreed to recognise Mauritian sovereignty over the archipelago, clause 2 would have ended British sovereignty over the territory and "at the same time it would revoke the British Indian Ocean Territory (Constitution) Order 2004, an order in council that currently serves as the territory's constitution". On 13 April 2026 a Foreign Office minister told the Commons that, because of delays in agreeing an updated exchange of notes with the United States, "the Diego Garcia Bill cannot complete its passage in this parliamentary Session, and it cannot be carried over". Asked in the House of Lords on 13 October 2026 about reintroducing it, a minister said: "We will return to the Bill in due course."

== Assessments ==
In 2012 Ronan Cormacain, in a dissertation at the Institute of Advanced Legal Studies, wrote that "The 2004 Order is legislation without a legislature", since it was not voted on by Parliament or by any representatives of the Chagossians. Writing on the Administrative Court Blog after Mandarin, Anurag Deb noted that the Order "is, in other words, primary legislation", which courts cannot invalidate under the Human Rights Act 1998, and argued that "although the undemocratic credentials of the 2004 Order opened the door to its scrutiny, the decisive standard by which that scrutiny was undertaken involved historical enquiry".

In 2008 the United Nations Human Rights Committee, noting the Court of Appeal's decision, recommended that the United Kingdom "should ensure that the Chagos islanders can exercise their right to return to their territory". In its 2019 advisory opinion the International Court of Justice recorded that the 2004 Orders "declared that no person had the right of abode in the BIOT nor the right without authorization to enter and remain there", and that "By virtue of United Kingdom law and judicial decisions of that country, they are not allowed to return to the Chagos Archipelago". It described the resettlement of Mauritian nationals of Chagossian origin as "an issue relating to the protection of the human rights of those concerned, which should be addressed by the General Assembly during the completion of the decolonization of Mauritius".

== See also ==
- Chagos Archipelago sovereignty dispute
- Expulsion of the Chagossians
- Agreement concerning the Chagos Archipelago including Diego Garcia
- British Indian Ocean Territory Immigration Ordinance 1971
- British Indian Ocean Territory Immigration Ordinance 2000
- Royal prerogative in the United Kingdom

== Sources ==
=== Legislation ===
- "The British Indian Ocean Territory (Constitution) Order 2004" (PDF). British Indian Ocean Territory Administration. 10 June 2004.
- "The British Indian Ocean Territory (Immigration) Order 2004" (PDF). British Indian Ocean Territory Administration. 10 June 2004.
- "The British Indian Ocean Territory (Immigration) (Amendment) Order 2022" (PDF). British Indian Ocean Territory Administration. 12 October 2022.
- "Orders in Council". British Indian Ocean Territory Administration.

=== Court decisions ===
- R (Bancoult) v Secretary of State for Foreign and Commonwealth Affairs, EWHC (Admin) 1038 (High Court (Divisional Court) 11 May 2006).
- R (Bancoult) v Secretary of State for Foreign and Commonwealth Affairs, EWCA Civ 498 (Court of Appeal 23 May 2007).
- R (Bancoult) v Secretary of State for Foreign and Commonwealth Affairs (No 2), UKHL 61 (House of Lords 22 October 2008).
- Chagos Islanders v United Kingdom, Application no. 35622/04 (European Court of Human Rights 11 December 2012).
- R (Bancoult No 2) v Secretary of State for Foreign and Commonwealth Affairs, UKSC 35 (Supreme Court 29 June 2016).
- R (Hoareau and Bancoult) v Secretary of State for Foreign and Commonwealth Affairs, EWHC (Admin) 221 (High Court (Divisional Court) 8 February 2019).
- R (Hoareau and Bancoult) v Secretary of State for Foreign and Commonwealth Affairs, EWCA Civ 1010 (Court of Appeal 30 July 2020).
- Legal Consequences of the Separation of the Chagos Archipelago from Mauritius in 1965, Advisory Opinion (PDF). I.C.J. Reports 2019. International Court of Justice. 25 February 2019. p. 95.
- R (Mandarin and others) v HM Commissioner for the British Indian Ocean Territory (Supreme Court of the British Indian Ocean Territory 31 March 2026), Text.
- R (Mandarin and others) v HM Commissioner for the British Indian Ocean Territory: Order (Supreme Court of the British Indian Ocean Territory 31 March 2026), Text.
- "Cause list, 15–17 July 2026: HM Commissioner for the British Indian Ocean Territory v The King (on the application of Mandarin & Ors), [2026] BIOT CA (Civ) 1" (PDF). British Indian Ocean Territory Court of Appeal. 2026.
- "Notice of judgment hand down: His Majesty's Commissioner for the British Indian Ocean Territory v The King (on the application of Mandarin & Ors), [2026] BIOT CA (Civ) 1" (PDF). British Indian Ocean Territory Court of Appeal. 4 November 2026.

=== Official documents ===
- Rammell, Bill (15 June 2004). "British Indian Ocean Territory (written ministerial statement)". Hansard, House of Commons. pp. 32WS–34WS.
- Brown, Thomas (30 October 2025). Diego Garcia Military Base and British Indian Ocean Territory Bill (HL Bill 139 of 2024–26) (Report). Library Briefing LLN-2025-0040. House of Lords Library.
- "Diego Garcia Military Base and British Indian Ocean Territory Bill". Hansard, House of Commons. 13 April 2026.
- "Diego Garcia Military Base and British Indian Ocean Territory Bill". Hansard, House of Lords. 13 October 2026.
- United Nations Human Rights Committee (30 July 2008). Concluding observations: United Kingdom of Great Britain and Northern Ireland (CCPR/C/GBR/CO/6) (PDF) (Report).

=== Other sources ===
- Cormacain, Ronan (2012). Prerogative Legislation as the Paradigm of Bad Law-Making: The Chagos Islands (PDF) (LLM thesis). Institute of Advanced Legal Studies, University of London.
- Deb, Anurag (2 June 2026). "The quashing of primary legislation: mystifying or mundane?". Administrative Court Blog.
- Nuckchhed, Vashish (17 July 2026). "Afrique: L'autodétermination au coeur des débats devant la Cour d'appel". L'Express (in French) – via allAfrica.
