= British Indian Ocean Territory Immigration Ordinance 2000 =

2000 immigration law of the British Indian Ocean Territory

Immigration Ordinance 2000

Commissioner for the British Indian Ocean Territory
- Citation: Ordinance No. 4 of 2000
- Territorial extent: British Indian Ocean Territory
- Enacted by: Commissioner for the British Indian Ocean Territory
- Enacted: 3 November 2000
- Repealed: 10 June 2004

Repeals
- Immigration Ordinance 1971

Repealed by
- British Indian Ocean Territory (Immigration) Order 2004

Related legislation
- British Indian Ocean Territory (Constitution) Order 2004

Summary
- Removed the permit requirement for British Dependent Territories citizens connected with the territory, and their spouses and dependent children, except on Diego Garcia
- Status: Repealed

The Immigration Ordinance 2000 (Ordinance No. 4 of 2000) was a law of the British Indian Ocean Territory (BIOT) made by the territory's Commissioner on 3 November 2000. It replaced the Immigration Ordinance 1971 after the Divisional Court, in Bancoult (No 1), quashed section 4 of the 1971 ordinance, under which entry to the territory required a permit. The new ordinance kept the permit system but exempted Chagossians and their families from it everywhere except Diego Garcia.

The ordinance accompanied a statement by the Foreign Secretary, Robin Cook, that the government would not appeal and would "put in place a new Immigration Ordinance which will allow the Ilois to return to the outer islands while observing our Treaty obligations". No Chagossian returned to live on the islands while it was in force; there was no infrastructure there, and the Chagossians awaited the report of a feasibility study on resettlement.

On 10 June 2004 two Orders in Council, the British Indian Ocean Territory (Constitution) Order 2004 and the British Indian Ocean Territory (Immigration) Order 2004, repealed the ordinance and restored full immigration control over the whole territory. Whether Cook's statement and the ordinance had given the Chagossians a legitimate expectation that this would not happen was a central issue in Bancoult (No 2), which the House of Lords decided against them by three votes to two in 2008.

== Background ==
The British Indian Ocean Territory was created by the BIOT Order 1965, which gave its Commissioner power under section 11 to "make laws for the peace, order and good government of the Territory". On 16 April 1971 the Commissioner enacted the Immigration Ordinance 1971, section 4 of which made it unlawful to enter or remain in the territory without a permit and allowed the Commissioner to order a person's removal. The Chagossian population had been removed from the islands by 1973.

In 1998 Olivier Bancoult applied for judicial review of the 1971 ordinance. On 3 November 2000 the Divisional Court (Laws LJ and Gibbs J) held that the power to legislate for the "peace, order and good government" of the territory did not include a power to expel all its inhabitants, and quashed section 4 as ultra vires. The court quashed only the ordinance; the Order in Council from which the Commissioner's power derived was not challenged.

== Making of the ordinance ==
=== Cook's statement ===
After the judgment the Foreign Secretary, Robin Cook, issued a press statement, which read in part:

I have decided to accept the Court's ruling and the Government will not be appealing. The work we are doing on the feasibility of resettling the Ilois now takes on a new importance. We started the feasibility work a year ago and are now well underway with phase two of the study. Furthermore, we will put in place a new Immigration Ordinance which will allow the Ilois to return to the outer islands while observing our Treaty obligations.

The statement went on: "This Government has not defended what was done or said thirty years ago." "Ilois" is a name for the Chagossians. The United Kingdom did not appeal.

=== Enactment ===
On the same day the Commissioner revoked the 1971 ordinance and made the Immigration Ordinance 2000. The Divisional Court in the later Bancoult (No 2) proceedings described it as "the British Indian Ocean Territory Ordinance No. 4 of 2000 (the Immigration Ordinance 2000)". The 2004 Immigration Order, which repealed it, refers to it as "The Immigration Ordinance 2000 of the Territory (Ordinance No. 4 of 2000), enacted by the Commissioner on 3 November 2000".

== Provisions ==
According to Lord Hoffmann, the ordinance "largely repeated the provisions of the previous Ordinance but contained a new section 4(3)". Section 4(1) provided that no person was to enter the territory, or remain there, without a permit issued under section 6 or an endorsement on a permit under section 8. Under section 4(2) the requirement did not apply "to members of Her Majesty's Forces, or to public officers, or to officers in the public service of the Government of the United Kingdom while on duty, or to such other persons as may be prescribed". The new section 4(3) provided:

(3) Except in respect of his entry into, or his remaining in, Diego Garcia, this section does not apply to any person who – (a) is, under the British Nationality Act 1981, ... a British Dependent Territories citizen and; (b) is such a citizen by virtue of his connection with the Territory; and it also does not apply to the spouse or to the dependent [sic] child, under the age of 18 years, of such a person.

Under the ordinance, a person had the required connection with the territory if he or she, or a parent or grandparent, had been born in the Chagos Islands. Subsections (4) to (10) of section 4 governed the question whether a person fell within the exemption. Lord Mance observed that "there was no difficulty in identifying the concept of a Chagossian for the purposes of the 2000 Ordinance".

Entry to Diego Garcia still required a permit. The ordinance therefore permitted Chagossians to return without a permit to the outer islands, including Peros Banhos and the Salomon Islands. In Sedley LJ's summary, "In substance, the Chagossians were permitted to return home." In 2003 Ouseley J noted that the ordinance did not entitle anyone "to go on private land".

== Operation ==
Lord Hoffmann considered that the change in the law "made no practical difference": some Chagossians visited the outer islands to tend family graves or see their former homes, but such visits had been made by permit under the old ordinance and were funded by the BIOT administration, and "No one went to live there." Before the 2000 judgment he had described the challenge to the 1971 ordinance as "largely symbolic", since return would "require an investment in infrastructure and employment which the Chagossians could not themselves provide". Ouseley J, giving judgment in the separate Chagos Islanders group action in 2003, said that there were no defence reasons against a return to Peros Banhos and the Salomon Islands, "But none have taken advantage of that possibility."

On 6 December 2001 the United Nations Human Rights Committee noted "the State party's acceptance that its prohibition of the return of Ilois who had left or been removed from the territory was unlawful", and recommended that the United Kingdom "seek to make exercise of the Ilois' right to return to their territory practicable". In its 2019 advisory opinion the International Court of Justice recorded the United Kingdom's submission that after the ordinance was adopted none of the Chagossians returned to live in the archipelago "although there was no legal bar to them doing so".

== Feasibility study ==
The government had decided in late 1999, while the Bancoult (No 1) claim was pending, to commission independent experts to examine the feasibility of a permanent resettlement of the outer islands. A preliminary study was produced on 20 June 2000. The second stage, carried out by Posford Haskoning as project managers, was planned as Phase 2A (hydrological monitoring) and Phase 2B (a more general examination), to be followed by a cost-benefit analysis as Phase 3. The first two phases were combined in a "stage 2B" report published in July 2002. (Note: The House of Lords said the report "was produced in June 2002" ([2008] UKHL 61, para. 23); the Divisional Court and the Court of Appeal gave its publication date as 10 July 2002 ([2006] EWHC 1038 (Admin), para. 84; [2007] EWCA Civ 498, para. 93).) Its general conclusions stated:

"To conclude, whilst it may be feasible to resettle the islands in the short-term, the costs of maintaining long-term inhabitation are likely to be prohibitive. Even in the short-term, natural events such as periodic flooding from storms and seismic activity are likely to make life difficult for a resettled population."

According to Lord Hoffmann, the report found "agroforestal" production unsuitable for commercial ventures, saw opportunities in fisheries, mariculture and tourism, and identified rising sea levels as likely to make the long-term cost of habitation prohibitive. The Divisional Court summarised its conclusion as being that long-term resettlement would be "precarious and costly." The government did not proceed with Phase 3. In discussions after the report, the government declined to commit itself to a resettlement policy while the Chagos Islanders action was pending, and resisted the Chagossians' argument that Cook's statement and the 2000 ordinance already amounted to the adoption of such a policy.

== Repeal in 2004 ==
On 10 June 2004 the Queen made, by Order in Council, the British Indian Ocean Territory (Constitution) Order 2004 and the British Indian Ocean Territory (Immigration) Order 2004. Section 9(1) of the Constitution Order declared that, because the territory "was constituted and is set aside to be available for the defence purposes of the Government of the United Kingdom and the Government of the United States of America, no person has the right of abode in the Territory". The Immigration Order repealed the 2000 ordinance and provided that no person was to enter or be present in the territory without a permit, subject to exemptions for the armed forces and public officers. Under it, an immigration officer could issue, renew or cancel a permit "acting in his entire discretion".

The Orders were announced on 15 June 2004 in a written statement to the House of Commons by Bill Rammell, Parliamentary Under-Secretary of State at the Foreign Office. Rammell said that after the 2000 judgment "it was decided not to appeal against that ruling, and the immigration law was amended to reflect it". Citing the feasibility report, he said that it would be "impossible for the Government to promote or even permit resettlement to take place. After long and careful consideration, we have therefore decided to legislate to prevent it." He added that restoring full immigration control was necessary for the defence use of the territory, "Especially in the light of recent developments in the international security climate since the November 2000 judgment". The two Orders, he said, "restore the legal position to what it had been understood to be before the High Court decision of 3 November 2000". In a later statement in the House of Commons he described the 2000 ordinance as one "which allowed the Chagossians to return and reside in any part of the territory, except, for defence reasons, Diego Garcia", and asked: "What has changed between now and then?"

Lord Hoffmann later wrote that the decision to legislate was precipitated by reports that Chagossians and their supporters were planning landings on the islands, which the ministerial statement did not mention. The Foreign Affairs Committee of the House of Commons was not shown the Constitution Order in draft; the Foreign Secretary explained that "we needed to preserve complete confidentiality if we were to avoid the risk of an attempt by the Chagossians to circumvent the Orders before they came into force."

== Litigation over the repeal ==
Bancoult applied for judicial review of the 2004 Orders on 24 August 2004. One of his grounds was that Cook's statement, together with the 2000 ordinance, created a legitimate expectation that the Chagossians would be free from immigration controls, which the Crown could not frustrate without a change in the relevant circumstances.

=== Divisional Court and Court of Appeal ===
On 11 May 2006 the Divisional Court quashed section 9 of the Constitution Order as irrational, because it had been made in the interests of the United Kingdom and the United States rather than those of the territory. It found it unnecessary to decide the legitimate expectation argument, but said it would have seen "much force" in it. The court's order declared that section 5(1) of the Immigration Order could not lawfully be applied, except on Diego Garcia, to Chagossians and their spouses and dependent children, and directed that "The provisions formerly contained in sub-sections (4) to (10) of the British Indian Ocean Territory Ordinance No. 4 of 2000 dated 3 November 2000 shall be applied mutatis mutandis" to decide who fell within that category.

On 23 May 2007 the Court of Appeal dismissed the government's appeal, all three judges holding that the Orders frustrated a legitimate expectation. Sedley LJ said that the case for a legitimate expectation was "a particularly strong one, because the public promise made by the Secretary of State to right the wrong exposed by the Divisional Court's first judgment was immediately implemented by the enactment of a right of return for all belongers to the Chagos Islands." Waller LJ said that Cook's statement "gave the clear impression that any dispute was over and that the Ilois would be able to return long-term".

=== House of Lords ===
On 22 October 2008 the House of Lords allowed the government's appeal by three votes to two. Lord Hoffmann held that the legitimate expectation claim "falls at the first hurdle", the requirement of a clear and unambiguous promise. Cook's statement had been made against the background of the feasibility study, and in his view "it comes nowhere near a promise that, even if there could be no resettlement, immigration control would not be reimposed." Even if it could be so read, he considered that the change of policy was justified, because no one had acted to their detriment on the strength of the statement and "the rights withdrawn were not of practical value to the Chagossians". On rationality, he said:

"During the four years that the Immigration Ordinance 2000 was in force, nothing happened. No one went to live on the islands. Thus their right of abode is, as I said earlier, purely symbolic."

Lord Rodger agreed that he could not "spell out of the statement, or the Government's action in putting the Immigration Ordinance in place, a clear and unambiguous promise that the Chagossians would be allowed to return and settle permanently on the outer islands."

In dissent, Lord Bingham found in Cook's statement "a clear and unambiguous representation, devoid of relevant qualification", which "was fortified by the making, on the same day, of the Immigration Ordinance 2000". Lord Mance read the statement as "an unconditional recognition, coupled with an assurance that this would be given effect, of a legal right to enter and to be present, whether on a temporary or long-term basis", and noted that section 9 "affected the rights to enter BIOT of a category of persons defined by the 2000 Ordinance" without any consultation of them.

=== Later proceedings ===
In 2012 the European Court of Human Rights declared inadmissible an application by Chagossians, in a decision that summarised the 2000 ordinance and its replacement by the 2004 Orders. In 2016 the Supreme Court dismissed Bancoult's application to set aside the House of Lords' decision on the ground of non-disclosure of documents relating to the feasibility study. Lord Kerr, dissenting, recalled that Lord Bingham and Lord Mance had held that the Foreign Secretary's statement and the making of the 2000 ordinance "created a legitimate expectation on the part of the Chagossians that they would be allowed to return to the outer islands".

== Later relevance ==
In the 2020 Hoareau appeal, concerning the government's 2016 decision not to support resettlement, the Court of Appeal recalled that the ordinance "was enacted to permit Chagossians to return to the Outer Islands, including Peros Banhos and Salomon, without a permit", but that "In the event there was no return to live there."

In R (Mandarin) v Commissioner for the British Indian Ocean Territory, decided by the Supreme Court of the British Indian Ocean Territory on 31 March 2026, the Chief Justice summarised that "the position from the year 2000 was that Chagossians could enter and remain on the outer islands of the BIOT" until the 2004 Orders. He described the right of abode in the outer islands as having been removed by the 1971 ordinance, "restored by the Immigration Ordinance 2000", and removed again by section 9 of the Constitution Order and section 5 of the Immigration Order. He quashed section 9, but the effect of that order was stayed pending an appeal by the Commissioner. The appeal was listed before the British Indian Ocean Territory Court of Appeal for 15–17 July 2026.

== Assessments ==
Lord Hoffmann regarded the right of abode under the ordinance as "purely symbolic", and observed that without government funding for resettlement the Chagossians had "secured an empty victory". Lord Mance took the opposite view of the 2000 settlement: in November 2000, he said, the government "assured Chagossians that they would have such a right, without undertaking any commitment to fund it." Richard Gifford, solicitor to the Chagos Refugees Group, told the Foreign Affairs Committee in 2007 that the ordinance "did not of itself enable resettlement to take place", because the islands had no civilian infrastructure and there was no transport to them from Mauritius.

== See also ==
- Expulsion of the Chagossians
- Chagos Archipelago sovereignty dispute
- Resettlement of Île du Coin

== Sources ==
=== Court decisions ===
- Chagos Islanders v Attorney General and HM BIOT Commissioner, EWHC (QB) 2222 (High Court 9 October 2003).
- R (Bancoult) v Secretary of State for Foreign and Commonwealth Affairs, EWHC (Admin) 1038 (High Court (Divisional Court) 11 May 2006).
- R (Bancoult) v Secretary of State for Foreign and Commonwealth Affairs, EWCA Civ 498 (Court of Appeal 23 May 2007).
- R (Bancoult) v Secretary of State for Foreign and Commonwealth Affairs (No 2), UKHL 61 (House of Lords 22 October 2008).
- Chagos Islanders v United Kingdom, Application no. 35622/04 (European Court of Human Rights 11 December 2012).
- R (Bancoult No 2) v Secretary of State for Foreign and Commonwealth Affairs, UKSC 35 (Supreme Court 29 June 2016).
- R (Hoareau and Bancoult) v Secretary of State for Foreign and Commonwealth Affairs, EWCA Civ 1010 (Court of Appeal 30 July 2020).
- Legal Consequences of the Separation of the Chagos Archipelago from Mauritius in 1965, Advisory Opinion (PDF). I.C.J. Reports 2019. International Court of Justice. 25 February 2019. p. 95.
- R (Mandarin and others) v HM Commissioner for the British Indian Ocean Territory (Supreme Court of the British Indian Ocean Territory 31 March 2026), Text.
- R (Mandarin and others) v HM Commissioner for the British Indian Ocean Territory: Order (Supreme Court of the British Indian Ocean Territory 31 March 2026), Text.
- "Cause list, 15–17 July 2026: HM Commissioner for the British Indian Ocean Territory v The King (on the application of Mandarin & Ors), [2026] BIOT CA (Civ) 1" (PDF). British Indian Ocean Territory Court of Appeal. 2026.

=== Other sources ===
- Rammell, Bill (15 June 2004). "British Indian Ocean Territory (written ministerial statement)". Hansard, House of Commons. pp. 32WS–34WS.
- Gifford, Richard (12 October 2007). Memorandum concerning British Indian Ocean Territory (submission from Mr Richard David Gifford, Chagos Refugees Group). Overseas Territories: Written evidence (Report). House of Commons Foreign Affairs Committee.
