= British Indian Ocean Territory Immigration Ordinance 1971 =

1971 law used to exclude the Chagossians from their islands

Immigration Ordinance 1971

Commissioner for the British Indian Ocean Territory
- Citation: Ordinance No. 1 of 1971
- Territorial extent: British Indian Ocean Territory
- Enacted by: Commissioner for the British Indian Ocean Territory (Sir Bruce Greatbatch)
- Enacted: 16 April 1971
- Repealed: 3 November 2000
- Authorizing legislation: British Indian Ocean Territory Order 1965, section 11

Repealed by
- Immigration Ordinance 2000 (Ordinance No. 4 of 2000)

Related legislation
- British Indian Ocean Territory (Constitution) Order 2004; British Indian Ocean Territory (Immigration) Order 2004

Struck down by
- Section 4 quashed by the High Court in Bancoult (No 1), 3 November 2000

Summary
- Prohibited any person from entering, being present or remaining in the territory without a permit, and allowed the Commissioner to order the removal of anyone unlawfully present

Keywords
- Chagossians; Right of abode; Peace, order, and good government; immigration control
- Status: Repealed

The Immigration Ordinance 1971 (Ordinance No. 1 of 1971) was a law of the British Indian Ocean Territory (BIOT), made by the territory's Commissioner on 16 April 1971, which provided that no person should enter the territory, or be present or remain in it, without a permit. It also allowed the Commissioner to order the removal of anyone whose presence was unlawful. It was made in the year in which the clearance of the Chagos Archipelago's inhabitants, the Chagossians, began on Diego Garcia to make way for a United States military base; the last inhabitants left in 1973.

Officials had begun planning an immigration law for the territory in 1966, and a Foreign Office legal adviser listed among its purposes in 1970 "to maintain the fiction that the inhabitants of Chagos are not a permanent or semi-permanent population". The courts later differed on how far the Ordinance was actually used: the High Court said in 2000 that the removal "was effected under" it, but later judges found no evidence that it had been used to expel anyone. It was relied on, however, to keep the islanders from returning.

On 3 November 2000, in Bancoult (No 1), the High Court quashed section 4 of the Ordinance as outside the Commissioner's power to legislate for the "peace, order and good government" of the territory. The government did not appeal, and the same day the Commissioner revoked the Ordinance and replaced it with the Immigration Ordinance 2000, which allowed Chagossians to enter and live on the islands other than Diego Garcia. In 2004 the exclusion was restored by two Orders in Council, the second of which, according to the Supreme Court of the British Indian Ocean Territory, "largely reflected" the 1971 Ordinance.

== Background ==
The Chagos Archipelago was governed as part of the colony of Mauritius until 1965. On 8 November 1965 the British Indian Ocean Territory Order 1965, an Order in Council, separated it from Mauritius and made it, with islands taken from Seychelles, a new colony, the British Indian Ocean Territory. The Order created the office of Commissioner, and section 11 provided that "The Commissioner may make laws for the peace, order and good government of the Territory".

On 30 December 1966 the United Kingdom and the United States agreed by an exchange of notes that the islands should be available for their defence needs. A confidential Agreed Minute of December 1966 recorded that the "administrative measures" the United Kingdom was to take included those necessary for "resettling any inhabitants". The Divisional Court in 2006, and the BIOT Supreme Court in 2026, said that "The 1971 Ordinance reflects the agreement reached in the 1966 Minute."

Government papers disclosed in later litigation showed what Laws LJ called "the concern of the British authorities to present to the outside world a scenario in which there were no permanent inhabitants on the Archipelago". A Foreign Office memorandum of 28 July 1965 stated that "none of them should be regarded as being permanent inhabitants of the islands", so that the reporting obligations of Chapter XI of the UN Charter would not apply.

== Drafting ==
According to Laws LJ, "first thoughts" on an immigration ordinance for the territory date from early 1966. A manuscript note of February 1966 suggested "something pretty rudimentary which merely allows for entry under permit and grants as few rights with as little formality as possible". A draft was in existence by March 1967; its clause 11 dealt with removing people to the place they came from, or to another place to which they consented to go with that place's consent.

In a minute of 23 October 1968, the Foreign Office legal adviser Mr Aust wrote that "There is nothing wrong in law or in principle to enacting an immigration law which enables the Commissioner to deport inhabitants of BIOT", and that "we are able to make up the rules as we go along". The draft was then kept in what Ouseley J called "cold storage" through 1969, pending the American plans for Diego Garcia.

On 16 January 1970 Aust advised on whether the draft should be enacted, and listed its purposes:

(a) To provide legal power to deport people who will not leave voluntarily;
(b) to prevent people entering;
(c) to maintain the fiction that the inhabitants of Chagos are not a permanent or semi-permanent population.

Under the heading "Maintaining the fiction", he wrote that "strict immigration legislation giving such labourers and their families very restricted rights of residence would bolster our arguments that the territory has no indigenous population". He also noted that the government, as owner of the land, could remove people as trespassers, but that "forcible removal of such persons on the grounds that they were trespassers might be less attractive than forcible removal on the grounds that their presence was unlawful under the Immigration Ordinance". He concluded: "On balance, we would prefer to have an Immigration Ordinance in force in case it was needed." According to another official's memorandum, Aust saw one advantage of an ordinance over landowners' rights in the power it would give the Commissioner to send a person out of BIOT altogether, preventing "island-hopping" within the territory.

In 2003, in Chagos Islanders v Attorney General, Ouseley J did not consider that the "fiction" remark showed that Aust had been recklessly indifferent to the law, observing that "a major purpose of the Ordinance was to remove or to provide legal back up for the removal of the permanent population".

The decision to enact the Ordinance was taken at the turn of 1970–71, and Laws LJ described the exchange of minutes that preceded it as showing "the earnest desire of the British government to ensure that its making should be attended by as little publicity as possible". In a telegram of 11 January 1971 the Commissioner sought the Foreign Office's approval for its enactment, noting that it would be published in the BIOT Gazette, "which has only very limited circulation both here and overseas". Laws LJ quoted a minute of January 1971 to the same effect: "Publicity will therefore be minimal."

== Enactment ==
The Commissioner enacted the Ordinance, as Ordinance No. 1 of 1971, on 16 April 1971, and it was published in the BIOT Gazette three days later. The Commissioner at the time was Sir Bruce Greatbatch, who was also Governor of Seychelles. The Ordinance was made under section 11 of the BIOT Order 1965, and counsel for the government effectively accepted in 2000 that the Commissioner had made it "upon the orders of the Queen's Ministers in London". It was made after the United States gave notice in 1970 that Diego Garcia would be required in July 1971.

== Provisions ==
Section 4, which the High Court later called "the critical measure", provided:

(1) No person shall enter the Territory or, being in the Territory, shall be present or remain in the Territory, unless he is in possession of a permit or his name is endorsed on a permit in accordance with the provisions of section 5 and section 7 of this Ordinance respectively. (2) The provisions of this section shall not apply to members of Her Majesty's Forces, or to persons in the public service of Seychelles or the Territory or in the service of any of Her Majesty's Departments of State, while on duty, or to such other persons as may be prescribed.

Section 9 provided that "It shall be unlawful for any person to enter the Territory or to be present or to remain in the Territory in contravention of the provisions of section 4 of this Ordinance". Under section 10(1), "The Commissioner may make an order directing that any person whose presence within the Territory is, under the provisions of this Ordinance, unlawful, shall be removed from and remain out of the Territory, either indefinitely or for a period to be specified in the order." Such an order was to be carried out as the Commissioner directed, and the person could be kept in custody while awaiting removal.

According to Ouseley J's summary, permits were issued by an immigration officer with "the widest possible discretion" over their issue or cancellation, normally for four years, and a refusal could be appealed to the Commissioner. It was an offence to remain in the territory without a permit after the Ordinance came into force. The European Court of Human Rights described the Ordinance as having made it "unlawful, and a criminal offence, for anyone to enter or remain in the territory without a permit". A removal order could send a person "to the place whence he came, or, with the approval of the Commissioner, to a place in the country to which he belongs, or to a place to which he consents to be removed", if that country's government consented.

Ouseley J noted that section 4 was "not sufficient by itself" to remove anyone: "Its operation requires an order. It is inapplicable to intra-BIOT movement."

== Application ==
=== The clearance of the islands, 1971–1973 ===
The inhabitants of Diego Garcia were moved between July and October 1971, some to the other inhabited atolls, Peros Banhos and the Salomon Islands, and others to Seychelles and on to Mauritius. The last inhabitants left Salomon in 1972 and Peros Banhos in 1973.

Whether the Ordinance was used in the clearance became a disputed question. In 2000 Laws LJ said that the removal "was effected under" the Ordinance. In 2003 Ouseley J accepted the government's submission that there was no evidence of any removal order by the Commissioner, and held that the plantation owner's private-law rights had been used instead, as "there is no evidence that the procedures envisaged by the Immigration Ordinance were ever deployed even in a vestigial form". In his view, "The documents show that the Ordinance was a back up to stop Ilois making for another island and to control their return should it be attempted." In the 2006 Bancoult (No 2) proceedings, Bancoult's counsel accepted that the Ordinance "did not in fact need to be used to effect the removal". Lord Hoffmann said in 2008: "There was no evidence that it had ever been used to expel anyone from the islands." Lord Mance noted that the Ordinance followed a decision taken in London by March 1971 that all the islands should be cleared, and said that "the Chagossians' objection to the 1971 Ordinance does not depend upon whether or not the 1971 Ordinance was the reason why they left".

=== Preventing return ===
When the Chagossian Michel Vencatessen sued the government in 1975 over his removal from Diego Garcia, the Crown's defence pleaded the Ordinance "not as the basis for the removal of the Ilois, but as the basis upon which the refusal of their return was lawful": they had no permit, had never sought one, and had not appealed any refusal. Ouseley J found that, after the evacuation, the government had forbidden the islanders' return to any part of the archipelago, "subject to scope for individual permits", until the 2000 Ordinance.

Visits were made under the permit system: according to Lord Hoffmann, Chagossians had visited the outer islands to tend family graves by permit under the 1971 Ordinance, in visits funded by the BIOT administration. In December 1993 the London solicitors Bindmans applied to the Commissioner on behalf of 12 Chagossians for a visit; permission for the group visit was refused in June 1994. The group appealed under the Ordinance, and in May 1995 a delegate of the Commissioner granted eight of them permits, on compassionate grounds, to visit Peros Banhos and Salomon.

The permit requirement also applied to the territory's fishery regime: the Fisheries (Conservation and Management) Ordinance 1991 provided that no person on a fishing boat in the territory's fishing waters should land without a permit under the Immigration Ordinance 1971.

== Legal challenges ==
=== Vencatessen (1975–1982) ===
In his Reply of October 1976, Vencatessen pleaded that the Ordinance was ultra vires the BIOT Order 1965, because its purpose was to remove all or most of the population and it was therefore not made for the territory's peace, order and good government. Ouseley J noted that this was the issue on which Bancoult won in 2000, raised "nearly 25 years earlier". The claim was never tried; it was stayed by agreement in 1982.

=== Bancoult (No 1) (2000) ===
On 30 September 1998 Olivier Bancoult, a Chagossian born on Peros Banhos, applied for judicial review of the Ordinance and a declaration that it was void because it purported to authorise the banishment of British Dependent Territories citizens from the territory. On 3 November 2000 a Divisional Court (Laws LJ and Gibbs J) held that section 11 of the BIOT Order did not empower section 4. Laws LJ rejected the argument that the court had no jurisdiction over a law of the BIOT legislature, finding that the Ordinance and section 4 were made "on the orders or at the direction of Her Majesty's Ministers here".

On the central issue he held:

S.4 of the Ordinance effectively exiles the Ilois from the territory where they are belongers and forbids their return. But the "peace, order, and good government" of any territory means nothing, surely, save by reference to the territory's population. They are to be governed: not removed.

He concluded that "there is no principled basis upon which s.4 of the Ordinance can be justified as having been empowered by s.11 of the BIOT Order", and that "the apparatus of s.4 of the Ordinance has no colour of lawful authority". Gibbs J said it was "unarguable" that the purposes of the BIOT Order and the Ordinance were to facilitate the use of Diego Garcia as a military base, but held that the islanders' "detention, removal and exclusion from the territory are inconsistent with any or all of those words". The court ordered "certiorari to quash section 4 of the BIOT Immigration Ordinance 1971", refusing to limit the order to the Chagossians: "I think we quash in its entirety and the Commissioner makes another order", Laws LJ said. The government was given permission to appeal but did not appeal.

=== Later judicial views ===
In 2003 Ouseley J said he did not consider the Divisional Court "by any means clearly correct in treating section 4 as empowering the removal of the population", since section 4 set up a permit system and removal required a separate order. He also held that there could be no liability in tort for enacting the Ordinance, and that there was no evidence that anyone had known or been recklessly indifferent to whether it was unlawful. In 2008 Lord Hoffmann held that the words "peace, order and good government" do not limit a legislature's power, adding: "So far as Bancoult (1) departs from this principle, I think that it was wrongly decided."

== Repeal and replacement ==
On the day of the judgment the Foreign Secretary, Robin Cook, issued a statement: "I have decided to accept the Court's ruling and the Government will not be appealing." He added that "we will put in place a new Immigration Ordinance which will allow the Ilois to return to the outer islands while observing our Treaty obligations".

On the same day the Commissioner revoked the 1971 Ordinance and made the Immigration Ordinance 2000 (Ordinance No. 4 of 2000). It largely repeated the earlier provisions, but its new section 4(3) provided: "Except in respect of his entry into, or his remaining in, Diego Garcia, this section does not apply to any person who" was a British Dependent Territories citizen by virtue of a connection with the territory, or to the spouse or dependent child of such a person. The Court of Appeal later said: "In substance, the Chagossians were permitted to return home." According to Lord Hoffmann, the change "made no practical difference", and "No one went to live there." The United Kingdom told the International Court of Justice that no one returned to live on the islands in the next four years, "even though there was no legal impediment to them doing so".

In 2001 the UN Human Rights Committee noted "the State party's acceptance that its prohibition of the return of Ilois who had left or been removed from the territory was unlawful". Ouseley J said that this acceptance "simply related to the limited effect of the Bancoult decision on section 4 of the Immigration Ordinance 1971".

== Restoration of the exclusion in 2004 ==
On 10 June 2004 two Orders in Council, the British Indian Ocean Territory (Constitution) Order 2004 and the British Indian Ocean Territory (Immigration) Order 2004, restored full immigration control over the territory. Section 9(1) of the Constitution Order declared that "no person has the right of abode in the Territory". Announcing the orders, the Foreign Office minister Bill Rammell told Parliament that the second order replaced the territory's existing immigration ordinance, and that "These two orders restore the legal position to what it had been understood to be before the High Court decision of 3 November 2000." In 2026 the BIOT Supreme Court said that the Immigration Order 2004 "largely reflected the Immigration Ordinance of 1971 which the Divisional Court in Bancoult No.1 had quashed". Like section 4 of the 1971 Ordinance, section 5 of the Immigration Order prohibits entry or presence in the territory without a permit, and section 12 allows the removal of anyone unlawfully present.

Bancoult challenged the 2004 orders; he succeeded in the High Court and the Court of Appeal, but in 2008 the House of Lords upheld section 9 of the Constitution Order by three votes to two in Bancoult (No 2). In March 2026, in a case brought by Chagossians encamped on Île du Coin, in the Peros Banhos atoll, (see Resettlement of Île du Coin), the Chief Justice of the BIOT Supreme Court traced the islanders' right of abode from its removal by section 4 of the 1971 Ordinance, through its restoration in 2000, to its removal again in 2004, and quashed section 9; that decision was stayed pending appeal.

== Assessments ==
The International Court of Justice, in its 2019 advisory opinion on the Chagos Archipelago, recorded that between 1967 and 1973 the islanders who had left were "prevented from returning", while "The other inhabitants were forcibly removed and prevented from returning to the islands", and described the Ordinance as having made it "unlawful for any person to enter or remain in the Chagos Archipelago without a permit". It said that the resettlement of Mauritian nationals, including those of Chagossian origin, "is an issue relating to the protection of the human rights of those concerned", to be addressed by the General Assembly.

In its written statement to the Court, Mauritius said that section 4(1) "provided the purported legal basis for the expulsion, and then the continued exclusion, of the Chagossians from the Chagos Archipelago". The United Kingdom's statement described the Ordinance as "making it unlawful to enter or remain in the territory without a permit and allowing the Commissioner to make an order directing a person's removal from the territory". The arbitral tribunal in the Chagos Marine Protected Area arbitration (2015) quoted section 4 in its account of the removal of the population between 1968 and 1973.

The anthropologist David Vine wrote that the Ordinance made it "a criminal offense for anyone except authorized military personnel to be on the islands without a permit", issued while the United States Navy was pressing for the deportations to be completed quickly. Human Rights Watch, in a 2023 report, described it as the Ordinance "that authorized the forcible removal of the Chagossians from their homeland".

== See also ==
- Expulsion of the Chagossians
- Chagos Archipelago sovereignty dispute
- Commissioner for the British Indian Ocean Territory
- Chagos Islanders v Attorney General
- Chagos Islanders v United Kingdom

== Sources ==
=== Court decisions ===
- R v Secretary of State for the Foreign and Commonwealth Office, ex parte Bancoult, EWHC (Admin) 413 (High Court (Divisional Court) 3 November 2000).
- Chagos Islanders v Attorney General and HM BIOT Commissioner, EWHC (QB) 2222 (High Court 9 October 2003).
- R (Bancoult) v Secretary of State for Foreign and Commonwealth Affairs, EWHC (Admin) 1038 (High Court (Divisional Court) 11 May 2006).
- R (Bancoult) v Secretary of State for Foreign and Commonwealth Affairs, EWCA Civ 498 (Court of Appeal 23 May 2007).
- R (Bancoult) v Secretary of State for Foreign and Commonwealth Affairs (No 2), UKHL 61 (House of Lords 22 October 2008).
- Chagos Islanders v United Kingdom, Application no. 35622/04 (European Court of Human Rights 11 December 2012).
- R (Mandarin and others) v HM Commissioner for the British Indian Ocean Territory (Supreme Court of the British Indian Ocean Territory 31 March 2026), Text.
- R (Mandarin and others) v HM Commissioner for the British Indian Ocean Territory: Order (Supreme Court of the British Indian Ocean Territory 31 March 2026), Text.
- Legal Consequences of the Separation of the Chagos Archipelago from Mauritius in 1965, Advisory Opinion (PDF). I.C.J. Reports 2019. International Court of Justice. 25 February 2019. p. 95.
- In the Matter of the Chagos Marine Protected Area Arbitration (Mauritius v. United Kingdom): Award (PDF). Permanent Court of Arbitration. 18 March 2015.

=== Legislation and official documents ===
- British Indian Ocean Territory Ordinance No. 1 of 1991: Fisheries (Conservation and Management) Ordinance 1991 (PDF). 1 October 1991 – via Memorial of Mauritius, Annex 102.
- Rammell, Bill (15 June 2004). "British Indian Ocean Territory (written ministerial statement)". Hansard, House of Commons. pp. 32WS–34WS.
- Written Statement of the United Kingdom (PDF). International Court of Justice. 15 February 2018.
- Written Statement of the Republic of Mauritius (PDF). Vol. I. International Court of Justice. 1 March 2018.

=== Other sources ===
- Baldwin, Clive; Human Rights Watch (15 February 2023). "That's When the Nightmare Started": UK and US Forced Displacement of the Chagossians and Ongoing Colonial Crimes (PDF) (Report). Human Rights Watch. ISBN 979-8-88708-029-1.
- Vine, David (2009). Island of Shame: The Secret History of the U.S. Military Base on Diego Garcia (PDF). Princeton University Press. ISBN 978-0-691-13869-5 – via Written Statement of the Republic of Mauritius (ICJ), vol. V, Annex 151 (extracts).
