= Vencatessen v Attorney General =

1975–1982 English High Court claim by a Chagossian against the British government

- Court: High Court of Justice
- Full case name: Michel Vencatessen v The Attorney General (for the Secretaries of State for Foreign and Commonwealth Affairs and for Defence)
- Decided: Never tried; stayed by agreement on 8 October 1982
- Citation: Unreported

Case history
- Prior action: None
- Subsequent actions: UK–Mauritius agreement concerning the Ilois (7 July 1982); Chagos Islanders v Attorney General [2003] EWHC 2222 (QB); Chagos Islanders v United Kingdom (ECtHR, 2012)

Court membership
- Judge sitting: Boreham J (interlocutory: refused leave to amend)

Keywords
- Intimidation, deprivation of liberty, assault, expulsion, settlement, test case

Vencatessen v Attorney General was a claim for damages issued in the High Court in London in February 1975 by Michel Vencatessen, a Chagossian who had been removed from Diego Garcia in 1971. (Note: English courts, the British government and the International Court of Justice write "Vencatessen"; Mauritius writes "Vencatassen"; the European Court of Human Rights writes "Ventacassen"; and Lord Hoffmann's speech in the House of Lords gives his first name as "Michael". In 1974 he was also recorded as "Mr Fleury".) He sued the Attorney General, on behalf of the Foreign and Defence Secretaries, for damages for intimidation, deprivation of liberty and assault arising out of his removal and transport to Mauritius. The claim was brought in one man's name, but both sides came to treat it as a test case for all the Chagossians, then known as the Ilois. In the House of Lords, Lord Hoffmann said the proceedings "came to be accepted on both sides as raising the whole question of the legality of the removal of the Chagossians from the islands".

The case never came to trial. Settlement offers to the Ilois community of £500,000 in 1978 and £1.25 million in 1979 failed. Negotiations with the government of Mauritius then led to the agreement of 7 July 1982, under which the United Kingdom paid £4 million ex gratia "in full and final settlement" of the Ilois' claims, and Mauritius undertook to try to obtain a signed renunciation of claims from each of them. After public pressure from other Ilois, Vencatessen instructed his solicitors to withdraw, and the action was stayed by agreement on 8 October 1982.

The settlement and the renunciation forms signed in 1983 shaped later litigation. In Chagos Islanders v Attorney General (2003) the High Court held that it was in principle an abuse of process for those who had signed to sue again. The European Court of Human Rights held in 2012 that those who settled "in the Ventacassen litigation" could no longer claim to be victims.

== Background ==
The British Indian Ocean Territory (BIOT) was created on 8 November 1965, and the Chagos islands were emptied of their population between 1967 and 1973. The closure of Diego Garcia was handled on the island almost wholly by the plantation managers, Moulinie & Co; Ouseley J found "no evidence of physical force being used". In September 1971 the ship Nordvaer took the last Ilois who did not want to go to Peros Banhos or the Salomon Islands to Mahé, in "dreadful" conditions. There they were housed in the unused section of the prison from 30 September until they left for Port Louis on 8 October 1971.

In Mauritius the Ilois, largely illiterate plantation workers who spoke only Creole, met unemployment, poor housing and discrimination. On 4 September 1972 the two governments agreed a payment of £650,000 towards resettlement; it was paid in March 1973. No resettlement scheme was put in place, and the money was paid out in cash only in 1977 and 1978, to 595 families, after inflation had greatly reduced its value.

== The claimant ==
Michel Vencatessen had been the senior overseer on Diego Garcia. He claimed to have been born there in 1922. He left on the Nordvaer's last voyage from the island. In Mahé, on 5 October 1971, he was issued with an identity document for his journey to Port Louis, describing him as "British Subject Citizen of UK & Colonies". In October 1974 he was one of three men, recorded as "Mr Fleury (also known as Michel Vencatessen)", who organised a petition to the British High Commission asking for land, housing and work in Mauritius, or else a return to the islands.

=== Accounts of his departure ===
The plaintiff's Further and Better Particulars of December 1976 said that the officer in charge of the Nordvaer told a meeting of the islanders that they could not stay but would receive compensation in Mauritius. The plaintiff's case was that he would be forced to leave or left to starve, that his wishes were not sought, and that Mauritius was the only "final" destination offered.

The Crown's evidence came mainly from the plantation managers. In 1975 the Seychelles Attorney General interviewed Paul and Marcel Moulinie of the plantation company, who said the transfers involved no naval or military personnel and no force, and that the families chose between Mauritius and the other Chagos islands. They said Vencatessen, like the other families, had been reluctant to leave, but that the promise of compensation and being allowed to take their possessions helped them decide to go. An unsigned 1977 statement by Marcel Moulinie, prepared for the case, said that Vencatessen "was a bit shaken at news of the evacuation" and talked about his forefathers, but accepted that he would have to go if the company told him to.

== Proceedings ==
=== The writ and the lawyers ===
The claim came out of an informal committee of Ilois organised by Christian Ramdass, Vencatessen's nephew. Ramdass approached the Mauritian lawyer-politician Gaëtan Duval, who put him in touch with Donald Chesworth, an English adviser to the Mauritius government, who suggested the London solicitors Sheridans. The senior partner, Bernard Sheridan, held a conference about Diego Garcia with Louis Blom-Cooper QC on 22 October 1974; a note of a conference in early 1975 recorded that the "claim appeared to be good".

The writ was issued on 17 February 1975 against the Attorney General on behalf of the Secretaries of State for Foreign Affairs and Defence. It claimed compensatory, aggravated and exemplary damages for intimidation, deprivation of liberty and assault arising out of his enforced departure from Diego Garcia and transport to Mauritius. Ouseley J later wrote that it "was not in form a representative, let alone a group, action although in its inception and conduct it had a number of those features". Sheridans applied for legal aid on 20 June 1975, and the claim was legally aided. On 11 November 1975 Gerald Levy of counsel advised that the "prospects of success ... are sufficiently high to justify proceeding further". Sir John Foster QC appears to have joined the plaintiff's team in 1976.

=== The pleadings ===
The Statement of Claim relied on Vencatessen's rights as a citizen of the United Kingdom and Colonies and alleged that unlawful force had been used to make him leave and that he had wrongly been refused return. The Re-Amended Statement of Claim of 1976 alleged that the British government was behind the removal of the Ilois, and sought a declaration that Vencatessen was entitled to return to live on Diego Garcia. Boreham J refused leave to add a conspiracy allegation against various ministers; legal aid was obtained to appeal, but no appeal was brought.

=== The Crown's defence ===
The Defence, drafted by Treasury Counsel, was served on 19 August 1975. It accepted that if Vencatessen had been born on Diego Garcia in 1922 he would be a citizen of the United Kingdom and Colonies, and also a Mauritian citizen from 1968. It pleaded that the workers had been moved with their consent, and that Vencatessen had agreed to leave at a meeting with the Moulinies shortly before he left. It said he lived there only as an employee, with his employer's leave, and denied that any servant of the Crown had used force. The Crown relied on the BIOT Immigration Ordinance 1971 to justify refusing return, not removal: the Ilois had no permit, had never sought one, and had not appealed any refusal.

The Reply of October 1976 said that the Crown could not rely on the plantation owners' rights to remove a subject from where he was entitled to live. It said that Vencatessen never consented to leave, or that any consent was obtained by a false promise of compensation, and that the Immigration Ordinance was ultra vires. Ouseley J noted that this was the issue on which Olivier Bancoult won his judicial review in 2000, raised "nearly 25 years earlier". (Note: See R v Secretary of State for Foreign and Commonwealth Affairs, ex p Bancoult (No 1).) He summarised the issues in this way:

The essential unlawfulness of compulsorily removing a whole population or the greater part of it from the BIOT was at the centre of the Vencatessen litigation.

=== Discovery ===
In January 1977 the case was ordered to be set down for a 15-day trial. The Crown claimed public interest immunity for some 600 documents, including papers on defence policy and on talks with foreign governments and the United Nations. Some were released in redacted form; the claim was never tested, as Vencatessen, on his lawyers' advice, did not pursue his application for discovery. After the discovery summons was adjourned by consent in 1978, there were no further formal court proceedings until the stay in 1982.

== A test case ==
From the start, Sheridans presented the case as one for all the Ilois. On 15 March 1975 they wrote to Ramdass that they were instructed to press a claim for Vencatessen "and thereafter for all those Diego Garcian Islanders and others who were removed from their homes". In 1977 the Treasury Solicitor's lawyer, Mr Munrow, told Sheridan that the Crown had always seen it as a "representative action". Ouseley J said that "Strictly, it was not", but that the phrase reflected the importance for all the Ilois that both sets of lawyers saw in the case.

The Mauritius government also saw the case as important. On 12 September 1977 he attended the Mauritian Resettlement Committee, whose chairman described "a test case" whose outcome would affect all the Ilois. Ouseley J called the litigation one of the most important "driving forces" of events, and wrote in 2003 that "It was quickly seen as a test case and generally beneficial." He rejected the suggestion by the 2003 claimants' counsel that Vencatessen had been "a cipher".

=== Parliament and the press ===
On 13 and 16 October 1975 David Ennals, a Foreign Office minister, gave written answers to Tam Dalyell MP about the Ilois. He said that the Vencatessen litigation prevented him from answering some questions, but that the Nordvaer had operated on the BIOT Administrator's instructions throughout 1971. In September 1975 an Insight article in The Sunday Times, "The Islanders that Britain sold", described the islanders' poverty and noted that one of them was suing the government. In Mauritius, Duval's Parti Mauricien Social Démocrate claimed in 1978 to have been instrumental in bringing the action.

== Settlement negotiations ==
=== The 1978 and 1979 offers ===
On 23 February 1978 the Treasury Solicitor made an open offer of £500,000 for the Ilois families who had left BIOT after 1965 and gone to Mauritius. It said the government would not pay "and yet still remain open to legal proceedings of the kind brought by your client", so receipts and discharges would be required. Internally, the Foreign Office said the offer was made in the same spirit as the 1972 payment rather than to compensate for "contested individual rights". Sheridan visited Mauritius in June 1978, and accepted in 2003 that he had seen the case as a precedent for other Ilois, as had the Treasury Solicitor.

On 9 May 1979 the offer was raised to £1.25 million. Blom-Cooper advised that it "ought to be accepted in full and final settlement". In October and November 1979 Sheridan took to Mauritius a form of quittance that included giving up any claim to return to the islands. Over 1,200 quittances were signed, but there was strong opposition from Ilois who objected to renouncing a return to Diego Garcia. On 25 November 1979 three Ilois committees wrote that they accepted the money but would not give up the right to return. In reply Sheridan advised that the "chances of success ... are probably not high".

=== 1980–1981 ===
In March 1980 a Joint Ilois Committee sent Sheridans a petition with some 800 signatures or thumbprints, offering to renounce return to Diego Garcia for adequate compensation. In July 1980 the Ilois who had led the 1979 rejection, including Charlesia Alexis, formed the Comité Ilois Organisation Fraternelle (CIOF), which would not renounce the right to return. In spring 1981 the Ilois groups claimed £8 million.

A Mauritian government delegation, which included Ilois members and Ramdass as Vencatessen's representative, negotiated in London over four days ending on 2 July 1981. A British minister said the terms were meant to remove any possibility of further litigation. A further £300,000 in aid was rejected, and the talks broke down. The CIOF then instructed the solicitors Bindmans, who took advice from John Macdonald QC. Ouseley J described the Vencatessen action as "the only non-political lever which the Ilois had".

=== The 1982 talks ===
Talks resumed in Mauritius on 22 March 1982, led for Britain by Sir Leonard Allinson. The Mauritian delegation included the minister Kailash Purryag, Paul Bérenger and Ilois representatives, among them Ramdass. Stephen Grosz of Bindmans and Macdonald advised the CIOF, paid for by the Mauritius government. The British opening offer, made ex gratia and without admitting legal responsibility, was £2.5 million, based on 426 families or 1,150 people who had left for Mauritius after BIOT was created. The British side said the Vencatessen case would also have to be withdrawn. Ouseley J found that both governments "clearly understood" this.

The Prime Minister of Mauritius, Sir Seewoosagur Ramgoolam, offered to add £1 million if Britain did the same. Mauritius then offered land worth £1 million, and the British delegation raised its offer to £4 million. Macdonald advised that the £4 million was a fair settlement and should be accepted. To protect Britain against later claims, the lawyers agreed on individual renunciations collected by the Mauritius government, together with £250,000 to be kept in the trust fund until the end of 1985.

The agreement was initialled on 27 March 1982 by both delegations, including the Ilois representatives. Vencatessen attended, and Purryag gave Allinson a letter saying that instructions to withdraw the case would soon be given.

== The 1982 Agreement ==
The agreement was signed by the two governments on 7 July 1982 and recorded in an exchange of notes (Cmnd. 8785). The new Mauritian government welcomed "the end of the saga of the Ilois community", and said the agreement concerned compensation, not sovereignty. Its main terms were:

- Article 1: Britain would pay £4 million "ex gratia with no admission of liability", which with the £650,000 already paid would be "in full and final settlement of all claims whatsoever of the kind referred to in Article 2".
- Article 2: the claims covered were those arising from acts done under the BIOT Order 1965, including the closure of the plantations, the removal of the inhabitants, their resettlement in Mauritius "and their preclusion from returning to the Chagos Archipelago".
- Article 4: Mauritius "shall use its best endeavours to procure from each member of the Ilois community in Mauritius a signed renunciation" of those claims, to be held for the British government.
- Article 5: Britain would be indemnified against any further claim out of the trust fund, which was to be set up by Mauritian statute and keep £250,000 until 31 December 1985, and ultimately by Mauritius.

In the preamble Mauritius undertook to provide land worth £1 million for the Ilois. The British government has described Article 4 as "a best endeavours obligation" on Mauritius.

== Withdrawal and stay ==
The withdrawal of the action was delayed. Vencatessen wanted his expenses and recognition for having started the case; at one point he asked for Rs 15,000 and a public meeting. At the first meeting of the Ilois Trust Fund Board on 11 August 1982, its government member Mr Bacha said that no money would come into the fund unless the case was withdrawn. Ouseley J found that "Public and intense pressure was brought to bear on Mr Vencatessen by the Ilois".

After a demonstration on 3 September 1982, Vencatessen was called to a meeting at the Prime Minister's office, where the government promised him Rs 15,000 if he withdrew; the same day he wrote to Sheridans instructing them to do so. After conflicting letters about whether he had signed under pressure, Sheridans asked a Mauritian lawyer, Marc David QC, to check; on 27 September he reported that he "freely and unreservedly wished the action to be withdrawn". In 2003 Vencatessen's son Simon said that crowds and threats had surrounded his father, but this account was not in his witness statement. Ouseley J described Simon as "an uncomfortable witness, possibly giving evidence in some fear".

The proceedings were stayed by agreement on 8 October 1982. A cheque for £4 million was handed over on 22 October 1982 at a ceremony attended by Ilois representatives. (Note: Appendix A of the same judgment dates the ceremony 28 October 1982. Mauritius gives 28 October 1982 as the date the agreement entered into force.)

== Implementation and the renunciation forms ==
The Ilois Trust Fund Act 1982 was passed on 30 July 1982. The Board paid Rs 10,000 to each Ilois in December 1982 and a land payment of Rs 36,000 per adult in June 1983; neither required a renunciation form.

When the last instalment of Rs 8,000 was paid in September 1983, recipients were given a renunciation form to sign or, much more often, to thumbprint. Ouseley J described it as "a one-page legal document, written in legal English, without a Creole translation". Signatories renounced "all claims, present or future" against the British government and Crown arising from acts under the BIOT Order 1965, including "my preclusion from returning to the Chagos Archipelago". A second form, otherwise the same, covered claims against the government of Mauritius. When payment was briefly held up, the British High Commissioner reported that Bérenger had told the Ilois "there could be no question of them not signing the renunciations".

Just over £4 million was paid out to 1,344 Ilois in 1983 and 1984. Only 12 refused to sign, including Vencatessen's sons Simon Vencatessen and François Louis; Simon did not receive the last payment, though his wife did. Simon then sued the Board in the Supreme Court of Mauritius, arguing that it could not require the form. The court dismissed his claim in 1989, following its 1984 decision in Permal v Ilois Trust Fund. The £250,000 was held back while forms were outstanding; about £250,000 was distributed in 1987.

== Later significance ==
=== Chagos Islanders v Attorney General (2003) ===
In 2002 more than 5,000 Chagossians brought a group action for damages. Ouseley J found that their arguments had been "foreshadowed by what was argued in the Vencatessen case". He held that the 1983 form covered all the claims, and that it was in principle an abuse of process for those who had signed it and taken the money to sue. He was not satisfied that Chagossians generally had known the form was more than a receipt, and left that to be shown individually. He held that the claims of named witnesses who had been 1982 delegates, Board members or community leaders were an abuse. Vencatessen's heirs could not claim through him, though they could sue in their own right; an argument that his withdrawal had been made under duress was not pursued.

=== House of Lords and European Court of Human Rights ===
In 2008 Lord Hoffmann said that Vencatessen and his advisers "were treated as acting on behalf of the Chagossians as a whole". In Chagos Islanders v United Kingdom (2012) the British government argued that the applicants were no longer victims because of the settlement of the litigation. The European Court of Human Rights held that those who settled and accepted compensation "have effectively renounced further use of these remedies". It held that those who could have sued at the time had failed to exhaust domestic remedies. It said the claims had been "settled, definitively".

=== International Court of Justice ===
In its 2019 advisory opinion, the International Court of Justice recorded the 1975 claim and its stay "by agreement of the parties" in 1982. It set out the 1982 Agreement and recorded that the money was paid to 1,344 islanders, who had to sign or thumbprint a form "renouncing the right to return".

In its written statement to the Court, the United Kingdom called the case "Vencatessen v Attorney General" and the first Chagossian claim in the British courts. It described the settlement as "broad in scope", and stated that "only 12 persons refused to sign". Mauritius said the claim had been settled on condition that the Chagossians "renounce their rights to future claims". It cited a UN Working Group report suggesting that the "no return" clause "was not understood by many of the Chagossians who were illiterate". It also argued that the settlement bound only those it covered and those who signed, and that the number who refused "may be higher" than 12.

== See also ==
- Expulsion of the Chagossians
- Chagos Archipelago sovereignty dispute
- Chagos Islanders v United Kingdom
- R v Secretary of State for Foreign and Commonwealth Affairs, ex p Bancoult (No 1)

== Sources ==
=== Court decisions ===
- Chagos Islanders v Attorney General and HM BIOT Commissioner, EWHC (QB) 2222 (High Court 9 October 2003).
- R (Bancoult) v Secretary of State for Foreign and Commonwealth Affairs (No 2), UKHL 61 (House of Lords 22 October 2008).
- Chagos Islanders v United Kingdom, Application no. 35622/04 (European Court of Human Rights 11 December 2012).
- Legal Consequences of the Separation of the Chagos Archipelago from Mauritius in 1965, Advisory Opinion (PDF). I.C.J. Reports 2019. International Court of Justice. 25 February 2019.

=== Other sources ===
- Written Statement of the United Kingdom (PDF). International Court of Justice. 15 February 2018.
- Written Statement of the Republic of Mauritius (PDF). Vol. I. International Court of Justice. 1 March 2018.
- Written Comments of the Republic of Mauritius (PDF). Vol. I. International Court of Justice. 15 May 2018.
