= Eweida v United Kingdom =

2013 European Court of Human Rights case

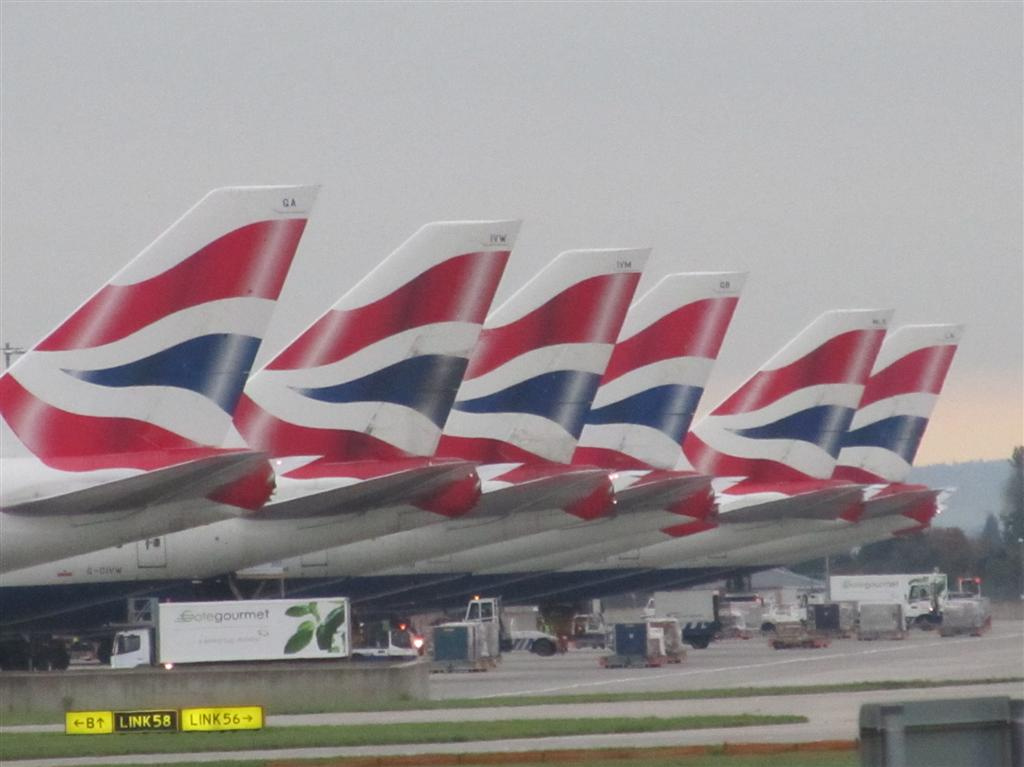
- Court: European Court of Human Rights
- Citation: [2013] ECHR 37

Case history
- Prior actions: Eweida v British Airways Plc, [2008] UKEAT 0123_08_2011; Eweida v British Airways Plc, [2010] EWCA Civ 80 (CA), [2010] IRLR 322; Eweida v United Kingdom [2011] ECHR 738 (preliminary questions)

Court membership
- Judges sitting: David Thór Björgvinsson (President), Nicolas Bratza, Lech Garlicki, Päivi Hirvelä, Zdravka Kalaydjieva, Nebojša Vučinić, Vincent A. De Gaetano

Keywords
- Indirect discrimination, religion, clothing policy

Eweida v United Kingdom [2013] ECHR 37 is a UK labour law decision of the European Court of Human Rights, concerning the duty of the government of the United Kingdom to protect the religious rights of individuals under the European Convention on Human Rights. The European Court found that the British government had failed to protect the complainant's right to manifest her religion, in breach of Article 9 of the European Convention. For failing to protect her rights, the British government was found liable to pay non-pecuniary damages of €2,000, along with a costs award of €30,000.

The case arose from a dispute between British Airways (BA) and one of its employees, Nadia Eweida, over its uniform policy, which required that religious jewellery had to be worn out of sight, under one's clothing. Eweida visibly wore a necklace with a religious symbol, a small cross, while working. British Airways placed her on unpaid leave for doing so. The British courts ruled in favour of British Airways and against Eweida under the Human Rights Act 1998, an Act of the British Parliament which implements the European Convention in British law. Eweida then brought a complaint under the European Convention against the Government of the United Kingdom, alleging that the decisions of the British courts amounted to a failure by the United Kingdom to protect her religious rights.

The case was widely reported in the British media. Some individuals argued that British Airways' policy showed anti-Christian prejudice. Other groups argued that the ruling showed favouritism towards people of faith.

== Facts ==
In October 2006, Nadia Eweida, a Christian employee of British Airways, was asked to cover up a cross necklace which depicted a Christian cross, and was placed on unpaid leave when she refused either to do so or to accept a position where she did not have to cover it up. She was wearing the necklace on the outside of her uniform, contravening BA's uniform policy for jewellery. Eweida planned to sue the airline for religious discrimination. Some Christian groups accused British Airways of double standards, as Sikh and Muslim employees are not prevented from wearing religious garments at work, since these are impractical to cover up. Although the wearing of garments is a requirement in some faiths, in this case, British Airways believes that wearing a cross is not necessary in Christianity, in general.

Eweida lost an initial appeal to her employers on 20 November, but publicly stated she would continue to dispute BA's policy, and that she wished to wear the cross to manifest her religion: the BBC quoted her as saying, "It is important to wear it to express my faith so that other people will know that Jesus loves them."

The National Secular Society argued it was sensible for staff handling baggage to be prohibited from wearing jewellery over their uniforms, said that Eweida was trying to evangelise in the workplace and that BA should have the right to insist that its uniform is neutral.

BA, having had the same policy with regard to jewellery being worn with the uniform for a long time, with which other staff were comfortable, responded to pressure and announced on 25 November a review of its uniform policy which could allow the wearing of a lapel badge. The Archbishop of Canterbury disclosed that the issue had been raised with the Church Commissioners, who look after Anglicans' financial interests. The following day Eweida declared that this compromise was unacceptable to her.

On 28 November, the Prime Minister, Tony Blair, publicly stated that in his view the issue was not worth BA fighting and that it would be best for the airline "just to do the sensible thing": i.e. allow the cross to be worn.

On 19 January 2007, BA announced that they would in future allow employees to wear a symbol of faith "openly" on a lapel pin, "with some flexibility ... to wear a symbol of faith on a chain".

== Judgments of the English tribunals and Court of Appeal ==
=== Employment Tribunal ===
Although BA changed its policy, it refused to pay Eweida for the period of her suspension. Eweida opted to pursue her case against BA at an employment tribunal, citing the original BA ruling as a form of discrimination against Christians. On 8 January 2008, after rejecting an out of court settlement offer reported at £8,500, Eweida lost her case. It was rejected on the grounds that she had breached the firm's regulations without good cause. The tribunal commented that it was "not a tribunal of faith". The tribunal's report highlighted several other issues regarding Eweida's conduct at BA, including refusing to work on Christmas Day and telling a gay colleague that he could still be "redeemed".

=== Employment Appeal Tribunal ===
In the Employment Appeal Tribunal, Judge Elias refused Ms Eweida's appeal.

=== Court of Appeal ===
Eweida first appealed to the Court of Appeal for a costs capping order, which was shortly refused. She then appealed on substantive grounds, which also failed in February, 2010. Lord Justice Sedley upheld the judgment of the EAT.

In October 2010, after the Supreme Court refused to hear her case, Ms. Eweida announced her intention to seek redress in the European Court of Human Rights in Strasbourg.

== European Court of Human Rights ==
The European Court of Human Rights heard Ms. Eweida's case in September 2012, in combination with three other cases. This was against the UK government for failing to provide domestic law to protect the claimed rights, rather than against BA. In January 2013, the court found that her rights had been violated under Article 9 of the European Convention on Human Rights and awarded her damages of €2,000 plus costs of €30,000. They ruled this as they said British Airways had not reached a fair balance between Eweida's religious beliefs and the company's desire to have a particular corporate image.

The court said the following, in weighing up the merits of the case.

94. It is clear, in the view of the Court, that these factors combined to mitigate the extent of the interference suffered by the applicant and must be taken into account. Moreover, in weighing the proportionality of the measures taken by a private company in respect of its employee, the national authorities, in particular the courts, operate within a margin of appreciation. Nonetheless, the Court has reached the conclusion in the present case that a fair balance was not struck. On one side of the scales was Ms Eweida's desire to manifest her religious belief. As previously noted, this is a fundamental right: because a healthy democratic society needs to tolerate and sustain pluralism and diversity; but also because of the value to an individual who has made religion a central tenet of his or her life to be able to communicate that belief to others. On the other side of the scales was the employer's wish to project a certain corporate image. The Court considers that, while this aim was undoubtedly legitimate, the domestic courts accorded it too much weight. Ms Eweida's cross was discreet and cannot have detracted from her professional appearance. There was no evidence that the wearing of other, previously authorised, items of religious clothing, such as turbans and hijabs, by other employees, had any negative impact on British Airways' brand or image. Moreover, the fact that the company was able to amend the uniform code to allow for the visible wearing of religious symbolic jewellery demonstrates that the earlier prohibition was not of crucial importance.

== Significance ==
This case highlighted some issues around the inadequacy of UK employment equality law in dealing with religion cases. There has been a suggestion from lawyers at Lewis Silkin LLP that perhaps a better approach might be for employers to have a duty to make adjustments to accommodate religion (as currently exists in the US and Canada).

== See also ==
- UK labour law
- UK employment discrimination law
- Goldman v. Weinberger
