= Chagos Islanders v United Kingdom =

European Court of Human Rights case decided in 2012

Chagos Islanders v the United Kingdom
- Court: European Court of Human Rights (Fourth Section, sitting as a Chamber)
- Full case name: Chagos Islanders against the United Kingdom
- Decided: 11 December 2012 (announced 20 December 2012)
- Citation: Application no. 35622/04; (2013) 56 EHRR SE15

Case history
- Prior actions: Chagos Islanders v Attorney General [2003] EWHC 2222 (QB), struck out; permission to appeal refused [2004] EWCA Civ 997
- Subsequent actions: None; the decision is final
- Related actions: Bancoult (No 1) (2000); Bancoult (No 2) (2008); R (Hoareau and Bancoult) v Secretary of State (2019–2020)

Court membership
- Judges sitting: David Thór Björgvinsson (President); Lech Garlicki; Nicolas Bratza; Päivi Hirvelä; George Nicolaou; Ledi Bianku; Nebojša Vučinić

Case opinions
- Application inadmissible. The right of individual petition was never extended to the British Indian Ocean Territory under Article 56; applicants who settled their claims in 1982 had renounced further use of domestic remedies and were no longer victims; others had failed to exhaust domestic remedies; the Article 6 complaints were manifestly ill-founded.
- Decision by: Majority (size not stated)

Keywords
- Article 56 (colonial clause); Right of individual petition; Victim status; Exhaustion of domestic remedies; Extraterritorial jurisdiction

Chagos Islanders v the United Kingdom (application no. 35622/04) is a decision of the European Court of Human Rights adopted on 11 December 2012, in which a Chamber of the court's Fourth Section, by a majority, declared inadmissible an application by 1,786 Chagossians against the United Kingdom. The applicants complained about their removal from the Chagos Archipelago between 1967 and 1973, the conditions they met in Mauritius and Seychelles, the ban on their return and the refusal of further compensation. The decision was announced on 20 December 2012 and is final.

The court held that the United Kingdom had never extended the right of individual petition to the British Indian Ocean Territory (BIOT), and rejected several other arguments for jurisdiction, but left open whether jurisdiction could arise on another basis. It decided the case on victim status: applicants who had settled their claims in 1982 and accepted compensation had "effectively renounced further use of these remedies" and could no longer claim to be victims, while those who could have sued at the time but did not had failed to exhaust domestic remedies. It rejected the complaints about the English proceedings as manifestly ill-founded.

On the day the decision was announced, the British government said it would review its policy on resettlement. The United Kingdom later relied on the decision before the International Court of Justice, and the English courts relied on it in holding that the European Convention on Human Rights does not apply to the territory.

== Background ==
=== Removal and compensation ===
Until 8 November 1965 the Chagos Islands were administered as part of the Colony of Mauritius; the islands were detached from Mauritius and the British Indian Ocean Territory was formed. In December 1966 the British and American governments agreed that the United States could use the islands for defence purposes. The islands were evacuated between 1967 and 1973; the court's summary of the facts records that "No force was used" but that the islanders were told they would be left without supplies unless they accepted transport elsewhere. An Immigration Ordinance of 1971 made it a criminal offence to enter or remain in the territory without a permit.

In 1973 the United Kingdom paid £650,000 to the government of Mauritius towards resettlement costs, which was distributed in cash to 595 families in 1977. In 1975 a Chagossian, Michel Vencatessen, sued the British government in the High Court in London. (Note: The decision spells the name "Ventacassen". The case is the subject of the article Vencatessen v Attorney General.) The claims were settled in 1982: the United Kingdom paid £4 million to Mauritius, which provided land worth £1 million, and between 1982 and 1984 1,344 Chagossians in Mauritius received £2,976 each. All but 12 of the identified islanders signed or thumbprinted renunciation forms in English; nothing was paid to the Chagossians in Seychelles. The applicants later said they had not known that the settlement involved any renunciation of their rights to return.

=== Litigation in the English courts ===
In 2000, in a case brought by Olivier Bancoult, the Divisional Court held the 1971 Ordinance invalid, and the ban was lifted for the outer islands, although none of the islanders went to live there. In 2002, 4,466 claimants began group litigation for compensation and a declaration of their right to return (Chagos Islanders v Attorney General). On 9 October 2003 Mr Justice Ouseley struck out the claims, holding among other things that further claims by those who had accepted money and signed renunciation forms were an abuse of process and that the claims were statute-barred. The Court of Appeal refused permission to appeal on 22 July 2004.

On 10 June 2004 two Orders in Council provided that no one had a right of abode in the territory or could enter it without authorisation, and on 15 June the government announced that it had abandoned a study of the feasibility of resettlement. Bancoult challenged the orders by judicial review; he succeeded in the Administrative Court and the Court of Appeal, but on 22 October 2008 the House of Lords allowed the government's appeal by three votes to two.

=== The Convention and the territory ===
The European Convention applies to a state's overseas territories only if the state makes a declaration under Article 56 (formerly Article 63), the so-called colonial clause; a further declaration under Article 56(4) is needed before individuals from the territory may petition the court. In Bancoult (No 2), Lord Hoffmann held that the United Kingdom's 1953 declaration for Mauritius had lapsed when Mauritius became independent, and that BIOT had been since 1965 "a new political entity to which the Convention has never been extended". It followed, he said, that the Human Rights Act 1998 had no application there.

== The application ==
=== Parties and procedure ===
The decision records the application as lodged on 20 September 2004. (Note: In discussing the six-month time limit, the decision refers to an introductory letter dated 9 December 2004 and to an application form received in April 2005.) Letters of authority were received from 1,786 applicants, natives of the islands or their descendants, living mainly in Mauritius, Seychelles and the United Kingdom. They were represented by Mr Gifford, a lawyer practising in London, and the government by its Agent. Human Rights Watch and Minority Rights Group International intervened in the written procedure. The Chamber was composed of David Thór Björgvinsson (President), Lech Garlicki, Nicolas Bratza, Päivi Hirvelä, George Nicolaou, Ledi Bianku and Nebojša Vučinić, with Lawrence Early as Section Registrar.

=== Complaints ===
The applicants relied on Article 3 in respect of the decision to remove them, the removal and its manner, the conditions on arrival in Mauritius and Seychelles, the ban on return, the refusal to facilitate return after the ban was held unlawful, and the refusal of compensation. They said the same matters breached their right to respect for private life and home under Article 8, and the protection of property under Article 1 of Protocol No. 1. Under Article 6 they complained that the 2004 Orders had annulled the effect of the 2000 judgment and that the courts had refused them a hearing on damages; under Article 13 they complained that they had no effective remedy.

=== The government's objections ===
The government argued that the application was out of time, since the application form had been lodged more than six months after the Court of Appeal's decision of 22 July 2004. It submitted that no notification had ever extended the Convention to BIOT under Article 56, and that the declaration for Mauritius had lapsed for the Chagos Islands in 1965 and entirely on Mauritian independence in 1968. Relying on Quark Fishing Ltd v United Kingdom (2006) and Al-Skeini v United Kingdom (2011), it argued that the "effective control" test could not supplant the system of declarations. It also argued that the applicants were not victims, because of the payments of 1972 and 1982 and the renunciation forms, and that several complaints had never been raised in the English courts.

=== The applicants' reply ===
The applicants said that their letter of 9 December 2004 was within the time limit. They argued that the Article 56 declaration for Mauritius continued to apply to the same islands, since it had never been denounced, and that it "would be absurd" if a state could escape its obligations by renaming a territory and placing it under direct rule. Alternatively, they argued that the United Kingdom had exercised effective control over the islands and direct physical authority over the islanders, that BIOT had been unlawfully excised from Mauritius, or that it formed part of the metropolitan territory of the United Kingdom. On victim status, they said that only 471 of the applicants had received compensation, that the Seychelles Chagossians had received nothing, and that those who signed had been largely illiterate, Creole-speaking and vulnerable.

The interveners argued that Article 56 was meant for dependencies with some domestic autonomy and that states should not be able to commit abroad acts they could not commit at home. They also referred to the collective rights of indigenous peoples and to forced evictions as serious human rights violations.

== Decision ==
=== Six-month rule ===
The court rejected the objection on time: the date of introduction was the applicants' introductory letter, which arrived within six months of the Court of Appeal's decision.

=== Jurisdiction ===
The court noted that the Chagos Archipelago ceased to be part of the Colony of Mauritius on 8 November 1965, before the United Kingdom first accepted the right of individual petition on 14 January 1966, and that BIOT had never been the subject of a declaration under former Article 63 or Article 56. It concluded:

It is therefore incontrovertible that at no time was the right of individual petition extended to BIOT.

Even if an express denunciation had been needed when BIOT was severed from Mauritius, the applicants could still derive no right to petition the court about the territory.

The court rejected the argument that the residence of many applicants in the United Kingdom brought their complaints within its competence: acts outside its competence "cannot become justiciable in Strasbourg merely because an applicant moved address". It held that BIOT was "an overseas Crown territory and not part of the United Kingdom itself". Relying on Banković v Belgium (2001) and Quark, it also rejected the argument that the measures were taken in London, since they mostly took effect purely in BIOT. The complaints about the English courts under Article 6, however, did fall within its competence.

On the relationship between Article 1 and Article 56, the court said that it was not persuaded that Quark had been wrongly decided, since the Grand Chamber in Al-Skeini had adopted its reasoning. It refused to set Article 56 aside as a colonial relic, saying that "the meaning of Article 56 is plain on its face and it cannot be ignored merely because of a perceived need to right an injustice". It observed that reading Al-Skeini as creating alternative bases of jurisdiction over overseas territories would render Article 56 "largely purposeless and devoid of content". But it found it "unnecessary to rule on this particular argument", because the complaints failed in any event.

=== Victim status and exhaustion ===
The court recalled that the 1975 proceedings had been settled in 1982 and that "the islanders agreed to give up their claims". The arguments that some applicants had not signed the forms or had not understood them had been rejected by the High Court after hearing extensive evidence, and the islanders had been represented by lawyers in the litigation that settled. Islanders outside the settlement could have made claims at the time, since the proceedings were widely known.

The court held that applicants who accept compensation in settlement of civil claims and renounce further use of local remedies will generally no longer be victims. The applicants had chosen to settle without obtaining a determination of their claims, and "It is not for the Court, in that event, to undertake the role of a first-instance tribunal of fact and law." It concluded that those who settled "have effectively renounced further use of these remedies" and could not claim to be victims under Article 34, and that those who could have sued but did not had failed to exhaust domestic remedies under Article 35(1).

Applicants who were not born on the islands and never had a home there could have "no claim to victim status arising out of those events and their immediate aftermath". As to the Article 8 complaint about the 2004 ban, the court relied on the House of Lords' finding that any right of abode was "purely symbolic", and held that the 2004 measure "cannot be said to have amounted to an interference with the applicants' right to respect for their homes". It continued:

The heart of the applicants' claims under the Convention is the callous and shameful treatment which they or their antecedents suffered from 1967 to 1973, when being expelled from, or barred from return to, their homes on the islands and the hardships which immediately flowed from that. These claims were raised in the domestic courts and settled, definitively.

It added that, as the House of Lords had held, the applicants' later attempts were "part of an overall campaign to bring pressure to bear on Government policy rather than disclosing any new situation giving rise to fresh claims under the Convention". No arguable claim engaging Article 13 had been shown.

=== Article 6 ===
The court found that the 2004 Orders had not reopened the 2000 judgment, which had required no action by the government, and it perceived "no appearance of depriving the applicants of the benefit of a final, enforceable decision". The High Court had examined the compensation claims thoroughly, and the limitation period was not impossible to comply with. There was "no indication of any arbitrariness or unfairness in these proceedings which could be construed as a denial of access to court", and the complaints were manifestly ill-founded.

=== Outcome ===
The application was rejected under Article 35(1), (3) and (4) of the Convention, and the court, "by a majority", declared it inadmissible. The decision does not state the size of the majority.

== Aftermath and later treatment ==
=== Reaction ===
Think Africa Press reported that the UK Chagos Support Association was "saddened and shocked" by the decision. Mark Lattimer, executive director of Minority Rights Group, told it that it was unrealistic to expect impoverished and partly illiterate islanders to have had the means to sue the British government in the English courts.

=== Resettlement review ===
On 20 December 2012 the Foreign Secretary announced that the government would "take stock" of its policy on resettlement. The Court of Appeal later recorded that the review was undertaken at the Prime Minister's request, on the basis that the government recognised that a "historic wrong had been committed". It led to a new feasibility study and, in November 2016, a decision against resettlement.

=== Before the International Court of Justice ===
In its written statement in the advisory proceedings on the Chagos Archipelago, the United Kingdom said that the court had declared the application inadmissible "inter alia" because the applicants' claims had been settled through the 1982 Agreement, and quoted paragraph 83. It argued that "The importance of those renunciations at the international level appears plainly from the 2012 Decision". In its advisory opinion of 25 February 2019, the International Court of Justice noted the decision and stated that one of its grounds was that the applicants' claims had been settled through the 1982 Agreement between Mauritius and the United Kingdom.

=== In the English courts ===
In R (Hoareau and Bancoult) v Secretary of State, a challenge to the 2016 decision against resettlement, the Divisional Court rejected the argument that Bancoult (No 2) had been superseded by later Strasbourg case law, noting that the European Court had found it unnecessary to rule on the Article 1 point. It held that the claimants were "in materially the same situation as the applicants" in the 2012 case, and quoted paragraphs 82 and 83.

On appeal in 2020, the claimants argued that the European Court would have decided differently had it known of the 2019 advisory opinion. The Court of Appeal disagreed, holding that Article 56 applied and Article 1 was excluded, as the European Court had confirmed in Quark, Al-Skeini and the 2012 decision, "which we consider to be clear in their reasoning". It also read paragraph 81 as treating compensation for "expulsion and exclusion from their homes" as a sufficient proxy for compensation under the Convention itself. The decision is reported as (2013) 56 EHRR SE15.

== See also ==
- Detachment of the Chagos Archipelago
- Expulsion of the Chagossians
- Chagos Archipelago sovereignty dispute
- Right of return
- Mauritius v. United Kingdom

== Sources ==
=== Court decisions ===
- R v Secretary of State for the Foreign and Commonwealth Office, ex parte Bancoult, EWHC (Admin) 413 (High Court (Divisional Court) 3 November 2000).
- Chagos Islanders v Attorney General and HM BIOT Commissioner, EWHC (QB) 2222 (High Court 9 October 2003).
- R (Bancoult) v Secretary of State for Foreign and Commonwealth Affairs (No 2), UKHL 61 (House of Lords 22 October 2008).
- Chagos Islanders v United Kingdom, Application no. 35622/04 (European Court of Human Rights 11 December 2012).
- R (Hoareau and Bancoult) v Secretary of State for Foreign and Commonwealth Affairs, EWHC (Admin) 221 (High Court (Divisional Court) 8 February 2019).
- R (Hoareau and Bancoult) v Secretary of State for Foreign and Commonwealth Affairs, EWCA Civ 1010 (Court of Appeal 30 July 2020).
- R (Pompe) v Secretary of State for Foreign, Commonwealth and Development Affairs; R (Mandarin) v Secretary of State for Foreign, Commonwealth and Development Affairs, EWHC (Admin) 529 (High Court 10 March 2026).

=== Other sources ===
- "Chagos islanders' case inadmissible because they accepted compensation and waived the right to bring any further claims before the UK national courts" (Press release). Registrar of the European Court of Human Rights. 20 December 2012. ECHR 460 (2012).
- Legal Consequences of the Separation of the Chagos Archipelago from Mauritius in 1965, Advisory Opinion (PDF). I.C.J. Reports 2019. International Court of Justice. 25 February 2019. p. 95.
- Written Statement of the United Kingdom (PDF). International Court of Justice. 15 February 2018.
- Wan, James (20 December 2012). "Chagos Islanders Lose the European Court Battle but the Struggle Continues". Think Africa Press. Archived from the original on 8 January 2013.
