= Think Africa Press =

- Type: Online magazine
- Format: Website
- Owner(s): Toyin Saraki
- Editor: James Schneider
- Founded: 2011
- Headquarters: London, United Kingdom
- Website: Official website

Think Africa Press was an English-language online magazine based in London focusing on reports and analysis of current affairs from Africa. The magazine was launched in January 2011 and is edited by James Schneider. It features articles from leading African and international thinkers, on-the-spot reporters, and experts, covering aspects including politics, history, the economy, legal, society, gender, health, agriculture and environmental issues.

== Format ==
The magazine brings together analysis from contributors around the world, representing a range of viewpoints and opinions about Africa. . Various special features have also been compiled which include background and analysis articles, interviews, reviews, and an editorial Q&A, explaining.

The magazine brings together has a multi-national staff based in London and a global network of expert correspondents, representing a range of viewpoints and opinions about Africa. The publication uses a variety of writing styles including news articles, interviews and blogs as well as multimedia such as videos and infographics.

== Notable contributors ==
- Desmond Tutu
- Robert I. Rotberg
- Mahmood Mamdani
- Sarah Leah Whitson
- Stephen Chan
- Barbara Harrell-Bond
- [Tewodros Melesse (Director General, International Planned Parenthood Federation)
- Jack McConnell
- Nasir El-Rufai
- Neville Isdell
- Joaquim Chissano
- Joyce Banda

== Critical reception ==
The launch of Think Africa Press was well received by a number of analysts such as Dr Phil Clark from the School of Oriental and African Studies, who described it as “a long overdue source of analysis and critical commentary”. In 2013 Think Africa Press was listed in Howzit MSN's "10 African Blogs You Should Be Reading"

Technorati has ranked Think Africa Press 34th in its Top 100 World Politics blogs. In 2013 Think Africa Press’s Environment page ranked 11th in a list of the top 100 environment blogs of 2013.

== Affiliations ==
Think Africa Press is a partner of the African Press Association, part of The Guardian Africa network, and regularly republished on AllAfrica.com. In 2011 Think Africa Press supported the Oxford University Africa Society by sponsoring their 2011 Pan-Africanism Conference.

== See also ==
- List of African studies journals
