= Chagos Islanders v Attorney General =

2003–2004 English group action by Chagossians against the British government

- Court: High Court of Justice (Queen's Bench Division); Court of Appeal
- Full case name: Chagos Islanders v The Attorney General and Her Majesty's British Indian Ocean Territory Commissioner
- Decided: 9 October 2003 (High Court); 22 July 2004 (Court of Appeal)
- Citations: [2003] EWHC 2222 (QB); [2004] EWCA Civ 997

Case history
- Prior action: Related: R v Secretary of State for the Foreign and Commonwealth Office, ex p Bancoult [2000] EWHC 413 (Admin)
- Subsequent actions: Permission to appeal refused, [2004] EWCA Civ 997; Chagos Islanders v United Kingdom (ECtHR, 2012), declared inadmissible

Court membership
- Judges sitting: Ouseley J (High Court); Butler-Sloss P, Sedley LJ and Neuberger LJ (Court of Appeal)

Keywords
- Misfeasance in public office, deceit, unlawful exile, negligence, limitation, abuse of process, group litigation

Chagos Islanders v Attorney General [2003] EWHC 2222 (QB) was a group action in the High Court of England and Wales brought by Chagossians, people born in the Chagos Archipelago and their children, against the Attorney General and the Commissioner of the British Indian Ocean Territory (BIOT). The claimants sought compensation for their removal or exclusion from the islands, which had been emptied of their population between 1967 and 1973, and declarations of their entitlement to return. On 9 October 2003, after a hearing lasting 37 days, Ouseley J granted the defendants summary judgment.

Ouseley J held that there was no arguable case in misfeasance in public office or deceit, that a proposed tort of "unlawful exile" did not exist, and that there was no arguable claim for damages in respect of property rights. He found an arguable claim in negligence for personal injury only, but held that the claims were barred by the Limitation Act 1980, and that it was an abuse of process for claimants who had signed renunciation forms in 1983 to sue. He also said that at least some of the claimants "could show that they were treated shamefully by successive UK Governments".

On 22 July 2004 the Court of Appeal refused permission to appeal. It agreed that those who signed the forms had "bindingly compromised" their claims and that every claim would in any event fail on limitation, while acknowledging "the shameful treatment to which the islanders were apparently subjected". The European Court of Human Rights later relied on the High Court's findings when it declared the islanders' application inadmissible in Chagos Islanders v United Kingdom (2012).

== Background ==
=== Removal of the population, 1967–1973 ===
The Chagos islands were administered from Mauritius, and their population, working on copra plantations, comprised Mauritian and Seychellois contract workers and families born on the islands, known as the Ilois, who now prefer to call themselves Chagossians. After Anglo-American discussions about US defence facilities, the British Indian Ocean Territory was created as a separate colony on 8 November 1965. On 3 April 1967 the Crown bought the plantation company's lands for £660,000.

Islanders who travelled to Mauritius in 1967 and 1968 were later refused passage back. On 16 April 1971 the BIOT Commissioner enacted the Immigration Ordinance 1971, which made it unlawful to enter or remain in the territory without a permit and was given "the minimum lawful publicity". Diego Garcia was evacuated between July and October 1971, and Peros Banhos and the Salomon Islands in 1972 and 1973; the last of the population reached Mauritius on 13 June 1973.

=== The 1972 payment ===
On 4 September 1972 the British and Mauritian governments agreed a payment of £650,000 towards the cost of resettling those displaced; it was paid in March 1973. The money was distributed only in 1977 and 1978, in cash, to 595 families, by which time inflation had substantially reduced its value; nothing was paid to Ilois in the Seychelles.

=== The Vencatessen claim and the 1982 agreement ===
In February 1975 Michel Vencatessen, who had left Diego Garcia on the last voyage of the evacuation ship Nordvaer, issued a writ in the High Court in London claiming damages for intimidation, deprivation of liberty and assault. By 1978 both sides treated it as in practice group litigation. A settlement attempt in 1979 failed after some Ilois objected to renouncing their right to return to Diego Garcia.

After negotiations between the two governments, with Ilois representatives in the Mauritian delegation, the offer was raised to £4 million, in addition to the £650,000 already paid, and Mauritius agreed to contribute land worth £1 million. The agreement was initialled on 27 March 1982 and signed on 7 July 1982; it provided for individual Ilois to sign renunciation forms. The £4 million was announced as "in full and final settlement" of all Ilois claims. The Vencatessen action was stayed on 8 October 1982, and the money was distributed by the Ilois Trust Fund Board, set up under Mauritian statute.

=== The renunciation forms ===
The last tranche of Rs 8,000 per person was paid in September 1983, and recipients were asked to sign, or more usually to thumbprint, a renunciation form. Ouseley J described it as "a one-page legal document, written in legal English, without a Creole translation"; only twelve people refused to sign. There were two forms, identical except that one renounced claims against the United Kingdom and the other claims against the Government of Mauritius.

=== Bancoult (No 1) ===
In 1998 Olivier Bancoult began judicial review proceedings, and on 3 November 2000 the Divisional Court held that section 4 of the 1971 Ordinance was beyond the powers conferred by the BIOT constitution. Ouseley J recorded that the decision, together with the release of documents under the thirty-year rule, gave the Chagossians "hope and confidence to organise and pursue other litigation".

== The claim ==
The claim form and group particulars of claim were dated 25 and 23 April 2002; a Group Litigation Order was made with the consent of the Lord Chief Justice on 11 April 2002 and sealed on 3 July 2002. The particulars identified two sub-groups: claimants living in Mauritius and Agalega, represented by the Chagos Refugees Group chaired by Bancoult, and claimants living in the Seychelles, represented by the Chagos Social Committee (Seychelles) chaired by Jeanette Alexis. There were 5,023 claimants, of whom 1,075 had been born on the islands.

The particulars relied on six wrongs: misfeasance in public office, a new tort of "unlawful exile", negligence, infringement of property rights, infringement of rights under the Constitution of Mauritius, and deceit; a claim for personal injury was added later. The claimants sought aggravated and exemplary damages, a declaration that the continued refusal to allow them to return was unlawful, and declarations as to the steps needed to make a return practicable.

The defendants applied to strike out the claim and for summary judgment, contending that the claims did not meet the requirements of the torts pleaded or were unknown to English law, and were in any event time-barred or an abuse of process. They pleaded that the islanders had been licensees of the landowners, that the plantation companies had organised their transport, and that adequate provision had been made for resettlement; they denied removing anyone against their will.

== Hearing ==
On 16 July 2002 Master Turner ordered the trial of preliminary issues and, at the claimants' request, directed that live evidence be heard. Binding findings of fact were generally to be made only on abuse of process and limitation, so the defendants did not call oral evidence. Robin Allen QC led for the claimants and John Howell QC for the defendants.

The hearing ran from 31 October 2002 to 10 January 2003 and lasted 37 days, with written closing submissions continuing until the end of March 2003. Almost all the claimant witnesses gave evidence through interpreters.

== High Court judgment ==
=== Findings of fact ===
Ouseley J found that, from an early stage, the two governments recognised that removing or resettling the inhabitants would be necessary, both for the security of the base and "to avoid the prospect of the new dependency becoming subject to international obligations in Article 73 of the UN Charter". The islanders acquired Mauritian citizenship at Mauritian independence in 1968 while remaining citizens of the United Kingdom and Colonies, and "This dual citizenship was not publicised at the time." He described the April 1969 submission to the Prime Minister, which contemplated the complete evacuation of BIOT, as covering the issues "comprehensively and without deceit or excess zeal by any officials".

On the evacuation of Diego Garcia, the judge found: "There is no evidence of physical force being used, but most of their dogs were rounded up and gassed or burnt". The voyage to Mahé was "dreadful", and on arrival the Ilois were housed in an unused section of the prison. In Mauritius, "extreme poverty routinely marked their lives", and they faced insults and discrimination.

=== The claimants' evidence ===
The judge noted that the witnesses were mostly illiterate Creole speakers recalling events long past, and found their written statements unreliable and their oral evidence often self-contradictory. He considered that a number of witnesses used "asserted poor recollections as a device to avoid facing up to evidential problems", while also saying that counsel's emphasis on their naivety did "the Chagossians in their determination and endeavour less than justice". He concluded that "some Chagossian witnesses gave deliberately false evidence on a number of issues, notably, but not only, Mrs Charlesia Alexis". He described Alexis as a leading campaigner of "undoubted strength of character", but found that she had been convicted of a fraudulent claim on the trust fund and had lied in evidence.

=== Misfeasance in public office ===
Rejecting the claimants' plea that no individual officer's bad faith need be identified, Ouseley J held that the tort "cannot be shown by adding one innocent mind to another innocent mind". On the documents, he found no evidence that any lawyer, official or minister thought the 1971 Ordinance was unlawful or was recklessly indifferent to its lawfulness; case law at the time treated the power to legislate for "peace, order and good government" as very wide. He considered a 1970 note by a Foreign Office legal adviser referring to "maintaining the fiction" that there was no permanent population, but held that it did not show recklessness as to the law.

On the removals, he found "not the slightest evidence of the threat of or the actual use of force or intimidation to bring about the removal of the Ilois". Pleaded words such as "forced" meant that the islanders "had no choice", not that physical force was used. He accepted that the government had arguably painted a false picture to the United Nations about whether there was a permanent population, but held that this was a matter of foreign relations and defence strategy that could not found the tort. The "sometimes harsh and contemptuous language" used about the Chagossians in the documents did not show the knowledge or recklessness required. He described the underlying problem as "an irreconcilable clash between the interests of the Ilois and the defence interests of the UK and USA", whose resolution "was a matter of politics". He concluded that there was no arguable case of misfeasance, and declined to let it proceed in the speculative hope that cross-examination would help.

=== Deceit ===
Ouseley J accepted that it was arguable that false statements about the islanders' status had been knowingly made to third parties such as the United Nations, but held that the claimants could not sue in deceit for statements they had neither received nor acted on. As to statements made to the islanders themselves, it was arguable that they had been told they had no right to remain, but there was no evidence that whoever said so knew or suspected that it was false. Article 73 of the United Nations Charter "confers no individual rights". There was no arguable case in deceit.

=== Unlawful exile ===
The claimants relied on Magna Carta, the Universal Declaration of Human Rights and the International Covenant on Civil and Political Rights for a tort of removing a citizen from British territory, or preventing their return, without consent or statutory authority. Ouseley J held that such a tort would be "no more and no less than a particular example of a tort for unlawful administrative acts", and that an ultra vires act does not of itself give rise to liability in tort; the remedy was judicial review. There could be no tortious liability for enacting the 1971 Ordinance, and "The tort does not arguably exist."

=== Property rights and the Mauritius Constitution ===
The claimants said they had acquired land by prescription or succession under Mauritian law and that those rights were protected by the Mauritius Constitution. The judge found that workers could occupy property as service occupiers, and that a 1983 BIOT ordinance had in any case removed any surviving rights. He held it "incontestable" that the Mauritius Constitution had not been carried over into BIOT, observing that the context "may be brutal" but showed that preserving fundamental rights "was not a legislative objective". He held that there was no arguable claim for damages in respect of property rights, and that any title to land had been extinguished under section 17 of the Limitation Act by 1985 at the latest.

=== Negligence ===
The negligence claim alleged a continuing duty to provide the means to lead "a roughly comparable lifestyle" to life on the islands. Ouseley J held that, as pleaded, this was "far too broad a claim to be arguable", and that "An affront to justice is not a cause of action nor do unfulfilled moral or political obligations become the source of legal obligations."

He held, however, that a narrower claim for personal injury was arguable for those compulsorily removed between 1971 and 1973. It was arguably foreseeable that inadequate reception arrangements would cause psychiatric and other illness, and there was "arguably no evidence" that even temporary arrangements had been made. He concluded: "There is an arguable claim in negligence but only for personal injuries."

=== Renunciation forms and abuse of process ===
The defendants argued that a person who accepts payment from one party in settlement of a claim against another cannot then sue that other party. Ouseley J accepted the principle and held that the form covered all the damages claims in the proceedings, though it was less clear whether it renounced the right to return itself or only claims relating to it. In principle, it was therefore an abuse of process for those who had signed the form and taken the money to sue.

He declined to find that the Chagossians in general knew the form was more than a receipt, noting that there had been no public notice of the requirement and no explanation in their own language; the process was "no signature, no money". But he held that those who had been members of the 1982 delegation or of the trust fund board knew the form's purpose, and that Bancoult, from his position in the Chagos Refugees Group, knew that the forms were part of the mechanism for preventing further claims. He held that the claims of ten named individuals, including Bancoult and (should she become a claimant) Alexis, were an abuse of process.

On whether the forms were unconscionable, he found it arguable that the signatories were weaker parties and that no positive attempt was made to explain the form, but rejected any suggestion of trickery. The settlement had been negotiated with legal advice from two firms of solicitors and a QC, and "Viewed in 1982 and 1983, it was a reasonable offer which was worked through according to its terms." The argument that a government could not settle claims involving its citizens' fundamental rights was "untenable".

=== Limitation ===
On the face of the claim, all the damages claims were time-barred. Ouseley J rejected the arguments that the court could disapply the Limitation Act because reliance on it would be unconscionable, and that poverty and distance from the courts amounted to a legal "disability". He held that, even if the deceit claim were arguable, time had begun to run well before 1996, and that section 32 of the Act, on fraud and deliberate concealment, was "of no avail to the Claimants". He refused to extend time for the personal injury claim under section 33.

=== Declaration of a right of return ===
The claim for a declaration of a right to return to Diego Garcia was "unarguable on the basis pleaded", which did not challenge the validity of the Immigration Ordinance 2000; the claim for a declaration about assistance and a particular way of life was also not arguable. The defendants accordingly succeeded on their application for summary judgment.

=== Remarks on the Chagossians' treatment ===
Ouseley J observed that the proceedings were not "a form of public inquiry" into the government's conduct, and that "Justice does not require an obviously unmeritorious case to be allowed to proceed." He added, however, that he was "acutely conscious of the position of at least some of the Claimants":

The Chagossians alone were made to pay a personal price for the defence establishment on Diego Garcia, which was regarded by the UK and US Governments as necessary for the defence of the West and its values. Many were given nothing for years but a callous separation from their homes, belongings and way of life and a terrible journey to privation and hardship.

— Ouseley J, para. 154

He described the 1982 accord as "driven by litigation" and "not evidently generous". Later in the judgment he said that he could not allow a claim to continue "for no better reason than sympathy with the Claimants' collective misfortune".

== Court of Appeal ==
The application for permission to appeal was heard on 17 June 2004 by the President of the Family Division, Dame Elizabeth Butler-Sloss, with Sedley LJ and Neuberger LJ. Sedley LJ delivered a single judgment to which all three had contributed.

=== The court's account of the history ===
The court found it clear that "between 1967 and 1973 the entire population was removed to Mauritius and the Seychelles, where they had neither homes nor work". Paying tribute to the comprehensiveness of Ouseley J's judgment, it acknowledged "the shameful treatment to which the islanders were apparently subjected", including "the deliberate misrepresentation of the Ilois' history and status, designed to deflect any investigation by the United Nations" and the use of legal powers "for the illicit purpose of depopulating them". It drew a parallel with the Highland Clearances, concluding that "the pauperisation and expulsion of the weak in the interests of the powerful still gives little to be proud of."

=== Renunciation on appeal ===
The court rejected the arguments that the defendants could not rely on the forms because they had not raised them in Bancoult, and that fundamental rights could not be compromised, a proposition for which it found no authority. It held that those who signed on receipt of compensation, "inadequate though the payments may have turned out to be", had "bindingly compromised" their claims.

=== Exile and misfeasance ===
The court explained that English common law "has no knowledge of the state": the Crown is only vicariously liable for its servants' torts, except under the Human Rights Act 1998. Exile without lawful authority was forbidden by Magna Carta and could be a public law wrong, but making it a tort would require a system in which the Crown could do wrong in private law, "and this, apart from the Human Rights Act, we do not have". Removal under a threat of force might be a trespass to the person, but none had been pleaded or found. On misfeasance, the documents showed that the Foreign Secretary and Prime Minister were party to the plan to depopulate the islands, but there was no evidence that they or their officials knew it was illegal; there was therefore "no viable claim".

=== Deceit and the Mauritius Constitution ===
The court agreed that the deceit claim based on statements to the islanders was unarguable. On statements to third parties, it said a cause of action might conceivably exist in exceptional circumstances, and that it would have granted permission on this point "Had there been no other conclusive answer to the claim". It also differed from the judge on the Mauritius Constitution: "the court's task is to give meaning and effect to the words on the page, not to the agenda of those who wrote them", and it was arguable that the BIOT Order had continued the constitution's rights in force.

=== Limitation on appeal ===
The court thought it conceivable that the defendants' conduct made reliance on limitation inequitable, or that the claimants' circumstances were a disability. But given the Vencatessen litigation, the negotiations and the creation of the trust fund, there was "no prospect at all" of showing that either survived beyond 1983, whereas the claim was issued in 2002. It endorsed the judge's analysis of deliberate concealment. It held that, even if the judge had been wrong about the causes of action, "any such claim would inevitably be defeated on grounds of limitation".

=== Conclusion ===
The court said that the judgment ended the islanders' quest for legal redress, and that what they had received had done little to repair "the wrecking of their families and communities" or to make amends for "the underhand official conduct now publicly revealed by the documentary record". No separate claim for declaratory relief had been developed, and it concluded: "It may not be too late to make return possible, but such an outcome is a function of economic resources and political will, not of adjudication." Permission to appeal was refused.

=== The government's objection ===
In later judicial review proceedings, counsel for the government stated that when the passage about the "deliberate misrepresentation of the Ilois' history and status" appeared in the Court of Appeal's approved judgment, "a protest was made that no opportunity had been given to the defendant to deal with any particularised allegation to that effect". The judgment had not been altered, and the government said that the allegation was not accepted. The Divisional Court responded that any basis for the allegation "lies in the record and the contemporaneous internal documentation", citing the British statement to the UN Fourth Committee in November 1965.

== Subsequent proceedings ==
On 10 June 2004, a week before the Court of Appeal heard the application, ministers placed before the Queen the British Indian Ocean Territory (Constitution) Order 2004 and the British Indian Ocean Territory (Immigration) Order 2004, the first of which, in the Divisional Court's words, "declared that no person has the right of abode in BIOT nor the right without authorisation to enter and remain there". The Orders were challenged in Bancoult (No 2). In that case the House of Lords said that "The whole sad story is recounted in detail in an appendix to the judgment of Ouseley J", and quoted the Court of Appeal's concluding paragraph in full.

In Chagos Islanders v United Kingdom the European Court of Human Rights noted that arguments that the islanders had been oppressed or had not realised that the settlement was final "were rejected by the High Court judge in a detailed judgment after hearing extensive evidence". It held that those who had accepted compensation and renounced further remedies could no longer claim to be victims, and that those who could have sued at the time had failed to exhaust domestic remedies. It described the heart of the claims as "the callous and shameful treatment which they or their antecedents suffered from 1967 to 1973". The application was declared inadmissible.

In its 2019 advisory opinion on the Chagos Archipelago, the International Court of Justice cited the High Court judgment for the terms of the 1971 Immigration Ordinance and for the renunciation forms, which it described as "written in English, without a Creole translation".

== See also ==
- Expulsion of the Chagossians
- Chagos Archipelago sovereignty dispute
- R v Secretary of State for Foreign and Commonwealth Affairs, ex p Bancoult (No 1)
- R v Secretary of State for Foreign and Commonwealth Affairs, ex parte Bancoult (No 2)
- Bancoult v. McNamara

== Sources ==
=== Court decisions ===
- Chagos Islanders v Attorney General and HM BIOT Commissioner, EWHC (QB) 2222 (High Court 9 October 2003).
- Chagos Islanders v Attorney General and HM BIOT Commissioner, EWCA Civ 997 (Court of Appeal 22 July 2004).
- R (Bancoult) v Secretary of State for Foreign and Commonwealth Affairs, EWHC (Admin) 1038 (High Court (Divisional Court) 11 May 2006).
- R (Bancoult) v Secretary of State for Foreign and Commonwealth Affairs, EWCA Civ 498 (Court of Appeal 23 May 2007).
- R (Bancoult) v Secretary of State for Foreign and Commonwealth Affairs (No 2), UKHL 61 (House of Lords 22 October 2008).
- Chagos Islanders v United Kingdom, Application no. 35622/04 (European Court of Human Rights 11 December 2012).
- Legal Consequences of the Separation of the Chagos Archipelago from Mauritius in 1965, Advisory Opinion (PDF). I.C.J. Reports 2019. International Court of Justice. 25 February 2019.
