= Nebojša Vučinić =

Montenegrin judge (born 1953)

Judge of the European Court of Human Rights in respect of Montenegro
- In office 15 April 2008 – July 2018

Personal details
- Born: 17 October 1953 (age 72) Cetinje, Montenegro

Nebojša Vučinić (Serbian Cyrillic: Небојша Вучинић; born 17 October 1953) is a Montenegrin judge born in Cetinje, Montenegro, and was the judge of the European Court of Human Rights in respect of Montenegro until July 2018.

== Education ==
He graduated from the High Grammar School of Titograd(today Podgorica) in 1972. In 1976, he obtained a Bachelor of Arts at the Faculty of Law of Titograd. In 1980, he completed a master's degree in international law at the University of Belgrade and in the same university obtained a Ph.D. in international public law and international relations.

== Career ==
From 1976 to 2008, he worked at the Podgorica Law Faculty, first as research assistant, then as assistant professor and full-time professor.

During his military service in 1980–1981, he was Defense Lawyer at First Instance Military Court in Belgrade.

During the 1990s, he was part of several experts group in charge of negotiations following the dissolution of Yugoslavia and the creation of a new union between Montenegro and Serbia, until Montenegrin independence.

From 2000 to 2008, he was the director of the University of Montenegro / Law Faculty Human Rights Center. Since 1994, he was also head of the Department in International law and International Relations.

From 2004 to 2006, he was the representative of Serbia and Montenegro in Sterring Committee for Human Rights at the Council of Europe.

From 2003 to 2007, he was member of the Judicial Council of Montenegro, in charge of proposing judge candidates for the courts of Montenegro to the Parliament.

He was Judge of the European Court of Human Rights from 15 April 2008 to 11 July 2018. In his curriculum vitae presented to the Parliamentary Assembly of the Council of Europe, he indicates his membership in several NGOs and associations. This includes CEDEM (Center for Democracy and Human Rights) of which he was a member of the Steering Committee, "Group for Change" of which he was also a member of the steering committee (the NGO "Group for Change" later reorganized in a political party Movement for Changes and turned to conservatism and euro-skepticism despite being mostly centrist in the beginning).

After his mandate as judge at the European Court of Human Rights, he returned as professor at the Faculty of Law to the University of Montenegro. He also became a member of the NGO Civic Alliance (Grandaska Alisanja), as part of their executive council.

He was cited in a recent NGO report for possible conflict of interest as he was at the European Court of Human Rights. Indeed, several NGOs he is or was a member of received fund from the Open Society Foundations, while he seated in cases where the Open Society Justice Initiative or other groups associated with the Open Society Foundations were involved.
