= Lech Garlicki =

Polish jurist

Lech (Leszek) Garlicki (born 23 August 1946 in Warsaw) is a Polish jurist and constitutional law specialist. Since 1988 he has been a professor at the Warsaw University, in the years 1993–2001 judge of the Constitutional Tribunal of the Republic of Poland and in the years 2001–2002 president of the Polish Society of Constitutional Law. Between 2002 and 2012 he was a judge of European Court of Human Rights.

Garlicki is one of the Founding Members of the European Law Institute, a non-profit organization that conducts research, makes recommendations, and provides practical guidance in the field of European legal development with the goal of enhancing European legal integration.

== Activity in the field of Human Rights ==
From 1993 to 2001, as judge of the Constitutional Tribunal of the Republic of Poland, he ruled in numerous cases dealing with human rights, with the implementation of the European Convention on Human Rights and the decisions of the European Court of Human Rights. He participated in the European Conferences of Constitutional Courts in Budapest (1996) and Warsaw (1999).

He also participated in teaching programs devoted to human rights issues, organized notably by the Helsinki Foundation, the Center for European Studies, the Council of Europe, the Venice Commission or the OCSE. He also cooperates with the Open Society Institute of Budapest in the Monitoring the EU Accession Process: Judicial Independence" program and the "Human Rights and Administrative Law Teaching" program and with the Central European University of Budapest in the "Fundamental Rights in the New Problem-Oriented Methodology; Teaching Constitutional Law in Russia” project.

According to a report published by the European Center for Law and Justice, as an ECHR judge, he seated in numerous cases in which he was in a position of conflict of interest because of his links with the Open Society Justice Initiative and the Helsinki Foundation.
