= Richard Gibbs (judge) =

British judge (born 1941)

Sir Richard John Hedley Gibbs (born 2 September 1941) was a British judge of the High Court of Justice, Queen's Bench Division 2000–2008; a Recorder 1981–1990; appointed QC 1984; a Circuit Judge 1990–2000; Knight Bachelor 2000; Presiding Judge Midland Circuit 2004–2007.
