= R v Secretary of State for Foreign and Commonwealth Affairs, ex p Bancoult (No 1) =

2000 English High Court decision on the exclusion of the Chagossians

- Court: High Court of Justice (Divisional Court, Queen's Bench Division, Administrative Court)
- Full case name: The Queen v Secretary of State for the Foreign and Commonwealth Office, ex parte Bancoult
- Decided: 3 November 2000
- Citations: [2000] EWHC 413 (Admin); [2001] QB 1067; [2001] 2 WLR 1219
- Transcript: BAILII

Case history
- Prior actions: Leave to apply for judicial review granted by Scott Baker J, 3 March 1999
- Appealed to: None (permission to appeal granted, but no appeal brought)
- Subsequent actions: R (Bancoult) v Secretary of State for Foreign and Commonwealth Affairs (No 2) [2006] EWHC 1038 (Admin); [2007] EWCA Civ 498; [2008] UKHL 61
- Related action: Chagos Islanders v Attorney General [2003] EWHC 2222 (QB)

Court membership
- Judges sitting: Laws LJ and Gibbs J

Case opinions
- Laws LJ (leading judgment); Gibbs J (concurring)
- Decision by: Laws LJ
- Concurrence: Gibbs J

Keywords
- Peace, order, and good government; Ultra vires; Certiorari; Right of abode; Magna Carta; Colonial Laws Validity Act 1865; Royal prerogative

R v Secretary of State for Foreign and Commonwealth Affairs, ex p Bancoult (No 1) [2000] EWHC 413 (Admin); [2001] QB 1067 was a 2000 decision of a Divisional Court of the High Court of England and Wales, in which Olivier Bancoult, a Chagossian born on Peros Banhos, challenged the Immigration Ordinance 1971 of the British Indian Ocean Territory (BIOT). Section 4 of the Ordinance prohibited anyone from entering or remaining in the territory without a permit; it was made in the year in which the territory's population was cleared to make way for a United States military base on Diego Garcia.

On 3 November 2000 Laws LJ and Gibbs J held that a power to make laws for the "peace, order and good government" of the territory did not include a power to exile its people, and quashed section 4 as ultra vires. Laws LJ said of the islanders: "They are to be governed: not removed." The court rejected arguments based on Magna Carta, on a common-law principle protecting constitutional rights, and on the government's motives.

The government did not appeal. The same day, Foreign Secretary Robin Cook announced that it accepted the ruling, and the BIOT Commissioner replaced the 1971 Ordinance with a new ordinance allowing Chagossians to return to the islands other than Diego Garcia. In 2004 the government restored full immigration control by Order in Council, and in Bancoult (No 2) the House of Lords upheld that order by three votes to two in 2008. Lord Hoffmann said that the 2000 decision was "wrongly decided" so far as it departed from the principle that the words "peace, order and good government" do not limit a legislature's power.

== Background ==
The Chagos Archipelago was ceded by France to Great Britain in 1814 and was governed as part of the colony of Mauritius until 1965. The judgment described the Ilois, the islanders now known as Chagossians, as "an indigenous people" who had been born there, as had one or both of their parents and, in many cases, earlier generations. The islanders were contract workers on the copra plantations, or members of their families, and none of them owned land; the Crown bought the plantation company's rights in 1967.

After the United Kingdom and the United States agreed to establish a US military base on Diego Garcia, the archipelago was separated from Mauritius and made part of a new colony, the British Indian Ocean Territory, by the British Indian Ocean Territory Order 1965, an Order in Council made on 8 November 1965 under the royal prerogative. Section 11 of the Order empowered the Commissioner for the territory to "make laws for the peace, order and good government of the Territory".

On 16 April 1971 the Commissioner enacted the Immigration Ordinance 1971. Section 4 provided that no person should enter the territory, or be present or remain in it, without a permit; section 9 made it unlawful to do so, and section 10 allowed the Commissioner to order the removal of anyone whose presence was unlawful. Counsel for the government effectively accepted that the Commissioner made the Ordinance "upon the orders of the Queen's Ministers in London". The last inhabitants left Diego Garcia in 1971, Salomon in 1972 and Peros Banhos in 1973.

The judgment said that the removal "was effected under" the Ordinance. Later courts qualified this: in 2006 the Divisional Court in Bancoult (No 2) recorded that Bancoult's counsel accepted that the Ordinance "did not in fact need to be used to effect the removal", and in 2008 Lord Hoffmann said there was "no evidence that it had ever been used to expel anyone from the islands". Lord Mance added that the Ordinance followed a decision taken in London in or by March 1971 that all the islands should be cleared, and that the islanders' objection to it did not depend on whether it was the reason why they left.

The population was disputed. Counsel for the government accepted that the Ilois numbered "at any rate in the hundreds", while Bancoult's counsel said the evidence showed numbers "well into four figures". A British official's report of March 1971 counted about 829 people in the archipelago, of whom 386 were Ilois holding both UK-and-Colonies and Mauritian citizenship.

== The claim ==
Bancoult was born on Peros Banhos in 1964. In 1967 his family travelled to Mauritius so that his infant sister, whose leg had been injured by a cartwheel, could receive medical treatment, and he never returned to the islands.

In April 1998 the BIOT administration wrote to the London solicitors Sheridans denying that there was any common-law right to return to one's country of birth or nationality, and denying that the 1971 Ordinance was invalid. On 1 May 1998 legal aid certificates were granted to two individuals for a proposed judicial review, and on 30 September 1998 Bancoult's application for leave to apply for judicial review was filed. He sought a declaration that the Ordinance was void because it purported to authorise the banishment of British Dependent Territories citizens, and a declaration that the policy preventing him from returning was unlawful. Scott Baker J granted leave on 3 March 1999 after a contested hearing.

The respondents were the Secretary of State for the Foreign and Commonwealth Office and the Commissioner for BIOT. Bancoult was represented by Sir Sydney Kentridge QC, Laurens Fransman QC and Anthony Bradley, instructed by Sheridans; the respondents were represented by David Pannick QC, Philip Sales and Cecilia Ivimy, instructed by the Treasury Solicitor. Argument was heard in July 2000, and the case was legally aided.

== The disclosed documents ==
The government disclosed its files to the court, and Laws LJ set out the officials' papers from 1964 to 1971 at length, partly because Kentridge argued that the Ordinance had been made for an improper purpose. He said they showed a concern "to present to the outside world a scenario in which there were no permanent inhabitants on the Archipelago", and that he "found the flavour of these documents a little odd".

The court cited the following documents, among others:

- A Foreign Office memorandum of 28 July 1965 stating that the intention was that none of the people on the islands "should be regarded as being permanent inhabitants", so that the reporting obligations of Chapter XI of the UN Charter would not apply.
- A note of 15 November 1965 in which an official advised "a policy of 'quiet disregard'" until the United Nations challenged the government.
- A minute of June 1966 explaining that recognising permanent inhabitants would bring the territory within the purview of the UN Committee of Twenty-four, and describing the plan to document the islanders as "belongers" of Mauritius or Seychelles as a device that, "though rather transparent", would give a "defensible position".
- A minute of August 1966 by the Permanent Under-Secretary, who wrote that there would be "no indigenous population except seagulls", and a reply from another official, Mr Greenhill, referring to "some few Tarzans or Men Fridays whose origins are obscure".
- An undated paper written after 12 August 1966 with a section headed "OBJECTIVES", which stated that the primary aim was that Britain or the United States should be able to clear an island "of its current population" when it was needed for defence facilities.
- Advice from a Foreign Office legal adviser, Mr Aust, in October 1968 that "we are able to make up the rules as we go along", and his January 1970 advice listing as one purpose of an immigration ordinance "to maintain the fiction that the inhabitants of Chagos are not a permanent or semi-permanent population".
- A minute of January 1971 noting that the Ordinance would be published in the BIOT Gazette, which had very limited circulation, so that "Publicity will therefore be minimal."

Laws LJ commended the government servants and counsel who had disclosed "without cavil or argument" all the material documents, some of which he described as "embarrassing and worse". Gibbs J said that some of the documents showed that "official zeal in implementing those policies went beyond any proper limits", and that right-thinking people would have reacted to them in a similar way "then as now".

== Judgment of Laws LJ ==
=== Jurisdiction ===
The government argued that the court had no jurisdiction because the Ordinance was an act of the BIOT legislature and the Crown is divisible, acting as a separate sovereign in each territory; it also pointed to the existence of a BIOT Supreme Court able to hear judicial review claims. Relying on authorities including R v Cowle (1759) and Ex p Mwenya (1960), Laws LJ held that the prerogative writs, including certiorari, could issue to any territory under the Crown. The existence of local courts went at most to the court's discretion, not to its jurisdiction.

He described the Crown's reliance on the separate sovereignty of BIOT as "an abject surrender of substance to form", because the Ordinance and section 4 were made "on the orders or at the direction of Her Majesty's Ministers" in the United Kingdom, and the BIOT government was "itself a very creature" of the United Kingdom's understandings with the United States. He concluded that the court had "ample jurisdiction" to quash an instrument "whose making was wholly procured by the United Kingdom government".

=== Magna Carta ===
Kentridge argued that section 4 was repugnant to chapter 29 of Magna Carta, which provides that no free man shall be exiled except by the law of the land, and was therefore void under section 2 of the Colonial Laws Validity Act 1865.

Laws LJ held that the argument was "in the end barren": even if Magna Carta extended to BIOT, it did not limit the power of the proper lawmaker, and the question remained whether section 4 was a valid law. He described Magna Carta as "the first general declaration" of the rule of law, and said that, so understood, it applied in BIOT: unless the removal was shown to have been done according to law, the applicant must succeed.

=== The Witham principle ===
Kentridge relied on R v Lord Chancellor, ex p Witham (1998), in which Laws LJ himself had given the first judgment, holding that a constitutional right could be removed only by specific provision in an Act of Parliament or by regulations specifically authorised by one. Laws LJ accepted that "a British subject enjoys a constitutional right to reside in or return to that part of the Queen's dominions of which he is a citizen", citing Blackstone, Chitty and Plender. He held, however, that the principle could not be applied to colonial legislation in the face of the Privy Council's decision in Liyanage v The Queen (1967), which the court should treat as binding on matters of colonial law. He acknowledged a "dissonance" between the rights given by English law and "the wintry asperity of authority such as Liyanage".

=== Nature of the Commissioner's power ===
Laws LJ rejected the government's argument that the Commissioner, as a colonial legislature, was not the agent or delegate of the Queen in Council, saying that, if it meant he could legislate as he chose, it invited "entry into a barbarous world where there is no rule of law". The Commissioner's power was therefore no wider than section 11 of the BIOT Order: "If the chosen last is s.11, the boot of s.4 can be no bigger." Laws LJ held that BIOT was a ceded colony, not a settled one, so that the British Settlements Act 1887 did not apply and the power to legislate for it derived from the prerogative.

=== Peace, order and good government ===
The government relied on Privy Council authority that the words "peace, order and good government" give the widest law-making power, describing them as words that "connote, in British constitutional language, the widest law-making powers appropriate to a sovereign". Laws LJ accepted that a colonial legislature with such a power was "the sole judge" of what those considerations required, and was not obliged to respect common-law precepts or English traditions of fair treatment. But, he said, "peace, order and good government may be a very large tapestry, but every tapestry has a border." He asked whether a reasonable legislator could regard section 4 as conducing to the aims of section 11, applying the Wednesbury test with a very wide margin of discretion.

He held that it could not:

S.4 of the Ordinance effectively exiles the Ilois from the territory where they are belongers and forbids their return. But the "peace, order, and good government" of any territory means nothing, surely, save by reference to the territory's population. They are to be governed: not removed.

He adopted an example given by Gibbs J during argument: the removal of a people might serve a territory's peace, order and good government if a natural or man-made catastrophe had made the land "toxic and uninhabitable". They had been excluded "for high political reasons: good reasons, certainly, dictated by pressing considerations of military security", but those were not reasons that touched the peace, order and good government of BIOT, whatever standard of review was applied.

The islanders' lack of property rights could not affect the position in public law, and nor could any payment of compensation. Laws LJ concluded that "the apparatus of s.4 of the Ordinance has no colour of lawful authority". He cited Tacitus's phrase "They make a desert and call it peace" from the Agricola, adding: "He meant it as an irony; but here, it was an abject legal failure."

=== Improper motive ===
Kentridge also argued that section 4 was made for ulterior purposes: to make way for the base and to keep the matter as secret as possible from United Nations scrutiny. Laws LJ rejected this as a free-standing ground. If section 11 had been as wide as the government argued, the needs of the base would have been within it, and "The desire for secrecy would have been ancillary, not separately objectionable."

=== The prerogative (obiter) ===
Laws LJ said that the question whether the same result could lawfully have been achieved in another way was "perhaps moot". He nevertheless expressed "considerable doubt whether the prerogative power extends so far as to permit the Queen in Council to exile her subjects from the territory where they belong", and said that sending a belonger out of the Queen's dominions altogether "could only be done by statute".

== Judgment of Gibbs J ==
Gibbs J agreed with Laws LJ's conclusions and analysis, and added a short judgment "because of the importance of the case to those involved". He said it was unarguable that the purpose of the BIOT Order and the Ordinance was to facilitate the use of Diego Garcia as a military base. Because the scheme served the interests of the United Kingdom, acting through the Secretary of State, the argument that the case belonged only to the BIOT courts was "unreal".

On Magna Carta, Gibbs J held that BIOT was a ceded colony and, on the basis of what he called an "(admittedly in modern context) arcane distinction", accepted that the charter could not be relied on. He declined to treat "peace order and good government" as "a mere formula conferring unfettered powers on the commissioner". Each of those words, he said, implied that the territory's citizens were there to take the benefits: "Their detention, removal and exclusion from the territory are inconsistent with any or all of those words." To hold otherwise would be "an affront to any reasonable approach to the construction of language", and he concluded that the Ordinance was unlawful.

== Order ==
After the judgments were handed down, Kentridge asked for declarations that section 4 was void and that Bancoult was "entitled to return to and to remain in" BIOT, and for further relief to be adjourned while the government held talks with the islanders' representatives. Laws LJ declined the adjournment, saying that "it is not this Court's role to act as a continuing policeman" over such negotiations, and the court made no declarations. Laws LJ also rejected a quashing order limited to the Ilois, which he said would amount to rewriting section 4 for the Commissioner: "I think we quash in its entirety and the Commissioner makes another order."

Pannick asked for permission to appeal and for a stay of the quashing order pending appeal, citing concern "about persons arriving at the Islands" and the base's importance to western security. Kentridge replied that the archipelago was 1,200 miles from Mauritius with no shipping line and only a military airfield, so that the prospect of hundreds of people arriving was "simply fanciful".

The court ordered:

- certiorari to quash section 4 of the BIOT Immigration Ordinance 1971;
- permission for the respondents to appeal to the Court of Appeal;
- a stay of the quashing order for seven days, any longer stay to be sought from the Court of Appeal;
- the whole of the applicant's costs, with a detailed assessment for the Legal Aid Commission.

The government did not appeal.

== Government response ==
On the day of the judgment, the Foreign Secretary, Robin Cook, issued a statement:

I have decided to accept the Court's ruling and the Government will not be appealing. ... we will put in place a new Immigration Ordinance which will allow the Ilois to return to the outer islands while observing our Treaty obligations. This Government has not defended what was done or said thirty years ago.

On the same day, the Commissioner revoked the 1971 Ordinance and made the Immigration Ordinance 2000 (BIOT Ordinance No 4 of 2000). It largely repeated the earlier provisions, but a new section 4(3) exempted from the permit requirement, except on Diego Garcia, anyone who was a British Dependent Territories citizen by virtue of a connection with BIOT, together with their spouses and dependent children. The Court of Appeal later said that "In substance, the Chagossians were permitted to return home."

In late 1999, while the case was pending, the government had commissioned an independent study of the feasibility of resettling the outer islands; a preliminary study was dated 20 June 2000. At the hearing on relief, Kentridge told the court that the government had financed the study "without prejudice to their legal contentions". The Phase 2B report, published in 2002, concluded that resettlement on a short-term subsistence basis was possible but that long-term resettlement would be "precarious and costly".

According to Lord Hoffmann, the change in the law "made no practical difference": some Chagossians visited the outer islands, but "No one went to live there." The International Court of Justice, in its 2019 advisory opinion on the separation of the Chagos Archipelago, recorded the 2000 judgment, the decision not to appeal and the new ordinance, and noted the United Kingdom's submission that no Chagossians had returned to live on the islands although there was no legal bar to their doing so.

On 10 June 2004 the government restored full immigration control through the British Indian Ocean Territory (Constitution) Order 2004 and an accompanying Immigration Order, both Orders in Council.

== Significance and later treatment ==
=== Effect on the Chagossian campaign ===
In later litigation, Ouseley J found that the success of the judicial review "gave them hope and confidence to organise and pursue other litigation", including the group action Chagos Islanders v Attorney General. Mr Gifford, the Sheridans partner who conducted that action, gave evidence that the community had coalesced around the Chagos Refugees Group after leave was granted in the judicial review, and that its success "enabled Mr Bancoult's group to sweep the slate". In that action the government, while not having appealed, took issue with some of the facts stated in the 2000 judgment and questioned its correctness, "reserving their position". In 2001 the UN Human Rights Committee noted "the State party's acceptance that its prohibition of the return of Ilois who had left or been removed from the territory was unlawful".

Lord Hoffmann described the challenge to the 1971 Ordinance as "largely symbolic" and the proceedings as part of a campaign to obtain government support for resettlement. Lord Mance disagreed that the Chagossians had been "in Bancoult I or the present proceedings, engaged in a mere campaign" of that kind, describing their wish for recognition of their connection with the islands as "deep-felt, longstanding and, in my view, understandable".

=== Bancoult (No 2) ===
Bancoult challenged the 2004 Orders in Council, and the 2000 decision was central to the arguments. In 2006 the Divisional Court (Hooper LJ and Cresswell J) said that it would be "minded to follow the conclusions reached by Laws LJ in paragraphs 55-57 and indeed it may well be that we are bound by them". In the Court of Appeal in 2007, Sedley LJ set out paragraph 57 of the 2000 judgment in full, as a passage that "deserves citation in full". He decided the case on its merits rather than on Bancoult's argument that the unappealed 2000 judgment prevented the government from relitigating the point. He also said that the documents disclosed in the first case showed how aware the Colonial Office had been of the principle that a state could not displace subject populations at will, "and of the need to circumvent it".

In 2008 the House of Lords allowed the government's appeal by three to two. The majority rejected the reasoning on "peace, order and good government":

- Lord Hoffmann held that the words "have never been construed as words limiting the power of a legislature", and said: "So far as Bancoult (1) departs from this principle, I think that it was wrongly decided."
- Lord Carswell accepted that a court "might understandably be strongly attracted" to the view that a law removing the Chagossians could not be for the colony's peace, order and good government, but held that "the rule of abstinence should remain unqualified".
- Lord Rodger said that Laws LJ had been "surely right" to rely on the distinction between ceded and settled colonies, which Professor Adam Tomkins had criticised as "such ancient and formal niceties".

The two dissenting judges relied on the 2000 judgment. Lord Bingham quoted paragraph 39, "which the Secretary of State accepted", in holding that there was no prerogative power to exile a population from its homeland. He also held that Cook's statement was a clear representation that the government would not challenge the Divisional Court's decision and would allow the Chagossians to return to the outer islands. Lord Mance said that a lawyer would know that the ratio of the 2000 decision was confined to the 1971 Ordinance, but that Laws LJ had expressed "considerable doubt" whether the same result could be achieved by Order in Council. To read Cook's statement as reserving the right to do so, he said, "would be unrealistic legalism".

=== Jurisdiction over overseas territories ===
The jurisdictional part of the decision has been cited in later cases on the status of overseas territories. According to the Supreme Court of the British Indian Ocean Territory, Lord Hoffmann in the Quark Fishing case (2005) cited it as authority for the High Court's jurisdiction over all Her Majesty's territories. Lord Bingham said in the same case that he did not understand the court in Bancoult to have ruled whether the Ordinance was made in right of the government of BIOT or of the United Kingdom. The Divisional Court in BAA v Commissioner (2023) also cited paragraphs 21 to 29 of the judgment for the High Court's supervisory jurisdiction over acts of the Crown in right of an overseas territory.

In March 2026, in a challenge to removal notices served on Chagossians who had landed on Île du Coin, the Chief Justice of the BIOT Supreme Court drew on Laws LJ's account of the history and summarised the 2000 decision. He noted that in 2000 the government had argued that the English High Court "has nothing to do with it", and said that the government had "previously vacillated" on whether acts concerning BIOT were done in right of BIOT or of the United Kingdom. In his view, Laws LJ's statement in paragraph 28 should be read only as acknowledging that the court in London can issue prerogative writs to those responsible.

== See also ==
- Expulsion of the Chagossians
- Chagos Archipelago sovereignty dispute
- R (on the application of Bancoult (No 2)) v Secretary of State for Foreign and Commonwealth Affairs (2016)
- R (Bancoult) v Secretary of State for Foreign and Commonwealth Affairs (No 3)
- Chagos Islanders v United Kingdom
- Bancoult v. McNamara
- Resettlement of Île du Coin

== Sources ==
=== Court decisions ===
- R v Secretary of State for the Foreign and Commonwealth Office, ex parte Bancoult, EWHC (Admin) 413 (High Court (Divisional Court) 3 November 2000).
- Chagos Islanders v Attorney General and HM BIOT Commissioner, EWHC (QB) 2222 (High Court 9 October 2003).
- R (Bancoult) v Secretary of State for Foreign and Commonwealth Affairs, EWHC (Admin) 1038 (High Court (Divisional Court) 11 May 2006).
- R (Bancoult) v Secretary of State for Foreign and Commonwealth Affairs, EWCA Civ 498 (Court of Appeal 23 May 2007).
- R (Bancoult) v Secretary of State for Foreign and Commonwealth Affairs (No 2), UKHL 61 (House of Lords 22 October 2008).
- R (Mandarin and others) v HM Commissioner for the British Indian Ocean Territory (Supreme Court of the British Indian Ocean Territory 31 March 2026), Text.
- Legal Consequences of the Separation of the Chagos Archipelago from Mauritius in 1965, Advisory Opinion (PDF). I.C.J. Reports 2019. International Court of Justice. 25 February 2019.

=== Other sources ===
- Westra, L. (2011). Human Rights: The Commons of the Collective. Vancouver: UBC Press.
