= Waller (surname) =

Waller is a surname mainly of Old English origin, with several possible etymologies. Notable people with this name include:

== Arts and entertainment ==
=== Music ===
- Charlie Waller (American musician) (1935–2004), American bluegrass musician
- Charlie Waller (British musician) (born 1980), British rock musician
- Fats Waller, jazz musician
- Gordon Waller (1945–2009), Scottish singer-songwriter and guitarist, one half of the duo Peter and Gordon
- Rik Waller, British singer

=== Other media ===
- Anthony Waller (born 1959), film director
- Carroll Waller (1927–2014), American preservationist and writer
- Douglas C. Waller (born 1949), American writer
- Edmund Waller (1606–1687), English poet and politician
- Emma Waller (1815–1899), English actress, famous in America
- Farida Waller (born 1993), Thai actress and model
- Fred Waller, (1886–1954), inventor of Cinerama
- Judith C. Waller (1889–1973), American radio pioneer
- Lewis Waller (1860–1915), English actor
- Mary Lemon Waller (1851–1931), English portrait painter
- Robert James Waller (1939–2017), American author
- Tom Waller (born 1974), Thai film director and producer
- Vincent Waller, American animator, showrunner of SpongeBob SquarePants since 2015

== Government and politics ==
- Benjamin Waller, Williamsburg, Virginia attorney and judge
- Bill Waller, American politician, governor of Mississippi
- Christopher Waller, American economist
- Edwin Waller, American statesman
- Gary Waller (1945–2017), British politician
- George Waller (judge), Lord Justice of Appeal, Court of Appeal of England and Wales
- George Platt Waller, American diplomat
- John L. Waller, lawyer, journalist, publisher and U.S. Counsel to Madagascar
- Keith Waller (1914–1992), Australian public servant and diplomat
- Mark Waller (judge), British judge
- Robert Waller (pundit), British elections expert
- William L. Waller, Jr., American chief justice of the Mississippi Supreme Court

== Military ==
- Albert Gregory Waller (1890–1967), Irish military pilot serving the British
- Hardress Waller (c. 1604–1666), English parliamentarian in the English Civil War, convicted of the regicide of King Charles I
- Hector Waller, officer in the Royal Australian Navy
- Littleton Waller, officer in the United States Marine Corps
- William Waller (c. 1597–1668), English Parliamentary general during the English Civil War
- William Francis Frederick Waller (1839–1885), British soldier and a recipient of the Victoria Cross
- Sir Richard Waller (c. 1395–c. 1462), English soldier and official noted for capturing the Duke of Orleans, the French commander at the Battle of Agincourt

== Religion ==
- Charles Henry Waller (1840–1910), Church of England theologian
- J. G. Waller, Canadian Anglican missionary in Japan
- John Waller (preacher) (1741–1802), Baptist preacher in Virginia, South Carolina and Kentucky

== Science and academia ==
- Alfred Rayney Waller (1867–1922), British journalist, translator and editor
- Augustus Volney Waller (1816–1870), British neurophysiologist
- Augustus Desiré Waller (1856–1922), scientist and son of Augustus Volney Waller
- Carroll Waller (1927–2014), American preservationist and writer
- Edward Waller (1803–1873), Irish zoologist
- Erik Waller (collector) (1875–1955), Swedish surgeon and book collector
- Ivar Waller (1898–1991), physicist

== Sports ==
- Alex Waller (born 1990), English rugby union player
- Charlie Waller (American football) (1921–2009), American football coach
- Chris Waller (gymnast) (born 1968), American gymnast
- Chris Waller (cricketer) (born 1948), English cricketer
- Darren Waller (born 1992), American football player
- Dwight Waller, American professional basketball player
- Erik Waller (sailor) (1887–1958), Swedish sailor who competed in the 1912 Summer Olympics
- Ethan Waller (born 1992), English rugby union player
- Phil Waller (rugby union), Wales and British Lions rugby player
- Ruth Waller, English athlete
- Tye Waller (born 1957), American baseball player
- Wilf Waller (1877-?), South African footballer with Bolton Wanderers, Tottenham Hotspur and Southampton

== Other fields ==
- Waller family (Kent)
- Anne Waller, Lady Waller (died 1661 or 1662), English diarist
- Frederick S. Waller (1822-1905), resident architect of Gloucester Cathedral
- Mathew Waller (1617–1680), Early New England settler

== Fictional ==
- Amanda Waller, DC Comics character
- The Waller family (Ray, Eve, Izzy and Elliot) from Night Swim
- Toby Waller, character of Roots known as Kunta Kinte

== See also ==
- Justice Waller (disambiguation)
- Waller (given name)
