= Edmund Waller (disambiguation) =

Edmund Waller (1606–1687) was an English poet and politician.

Edmund Waller may also refer to:

- Edmund Waller (died 1700) (1652–1700), MP for Amersham
- Edmund Waller (died 1771) (1696–1771), MP for Great Marlow and Wycombe
- Edmund Waller (1725–1788), MP for Wycombe
- Edmund Waller (cricketer) (1838–1871), English cricketer and British Army officer
- Sir Edmund Waller, 4th Baronet (1797–1851)
- Edmund Waller (1884–1951), English stage actor and theatrical manager, ex-husband of Ethel Warwick.

== See also ==
- Waller family (Kent)
- Waller baronets
