= Waller =

Waller may refer to:

== Places in the United States ==
- Waller, Pennsylvania
- Waller, Texas
- Waller, Washington
- Waller County, Texas

== People ==
- Waller (given name)
- Waller (surname)
- nickname of John Walsh (rugby league), English rugby league footballer in the 1960s and '70s

== Fictional characters ==
- Amanda Waller, a fictional character in the Suicide Squad comic books published by DC Comics
- Amanda Waller (DC Extended Universe), a fictional character in the DCEU and DCU franchises

== Other uses ==
- Waller baronets, two baronetcies, one in the Baronetage of Ireland and one in the Baronetage of the United Kingdom
- Waller, an occupation in open-pan salt making

== See also ==
- Waller v. Florida, a 1970 United States Supreme Court case
- Wall (disambiguation)
