= R v Secretary of State for Foreign and Commonwealth Affairs, ex parte Bancoult (No 2) =

UK constitutional law case on the Chagos Islanders

- Court: House of Lords
- Full case name: R (on the application of Bancoult) v Secretary of State for Foreign and Commonwealth Affairs
- Decided: 22 October 2008
- Citations: [2008] UKHL 61; [2009] 1 AC 453; [2008] 3 WLR 955; [2008] 4 All ER 1055
- Transcript: BAILII transcript

Case history
- Prior actions: Divisional Court: section 9 quashed, [2006] EWHC 1038 (Admin), 11 May 2006; Court of Appeal: appeal dismissed, [2007] EWCA Civ 498, [2008] QB 365, 23 May 2007
- Subsequent actions: Chagos Islanders v United Kingdom (ECtHR, 2012): application inadmissible; Application to set aside the decision refused 3–2, [2016] UKSC 35 (R (on the application of Bancoult (No 2)) v Secretary of State for Foreign and Commonwealth Affairs)

Court membership
- Judges sitting: Lord Hoffmann; Lord Bingham of Cornhill; Lord Rodger of Earlsferry; Lord Carswell; Lord Mance

Case opinions
- Majority: Lord Hoffmann, Lord Rodger, Lord Carswell; Dissent: Lord Bingham, Lord Mance

Keywords
- Royal prerogative, Order in Council, judicial review, legitimate expectation, right of abode, Chagos Islands

R v Secretary of State for Foreign and Commonwealth Affairs, ex parte Bancoult (No 2) [2008] UKHL 61 is a UK constitutional law case concerning the validity of section 9 of the British Indian Ocean Territory (Constitution) Order 2004, a prerogative Order in Council which provides that "no person has the right of abode" in the British Indian Ocean Territory (BIOT) and so barred the Chagossians from returning to the Chagos Islands. The islands, ceded to the United Kingdom by France in 1814 as part of the colony of Mauritius, were detached from Mauritius in 1965 to form the BIOT so that a United States military base could be built on Diego Garcia, and between 1968 and 1973 their population was removed, mostly to Mauritius and the Seychelles.

In Bancoult (No 1) the Divisional Court in 2000 quashed the 1971 ordinance excluding the islanders; the Foreign Secretary, Robin Cook, did not appeal, and a new ordinance allowed return to the outer islands. In June 2004 the government reversed that position by two Orders in Council, and Olivier Bancoult challenged them. The Divisional Court (Hooper LJ and Cresswell J) quashed section 9 as irrational on 11 May 2006, and on 23 May 2007 the Court of Appeal (Sir Anthony Clarke MR, Waller LJ and Sedley LJ) dismissed the government's appeal, holding that the Orders frustrated a legitimate expectation created by Cook's statement and were an abuse of power.

The House of Lords allowed the government's appeal by three to two on 22 October 2008. All five Law Lords held that prerogative Orders in Council are open to judicial review on the ordinary grounds of legality, rationality and procedural impropriety. The majority, Lords Hoffmann, Rodger and Carswell, held that the Crown has plenary power to legislate for a ceded colony, that section 9 was not irrational, and that Cook's statement was not a clear and unambiguous promise. Lords Bingham and Mance dissented, holding that the prerogative did not extend to exiling a territory's population.

The reaction to the decision was negative, with academics accusing the majority Law Lords of failing to do their job as members of the judiciary to "rework things like neo-imperial texts and outdated legal attitudes to the prerogative in order to cure obvious injustices and to vindicate a modern conception of the rule of law"; at the same time, their approach to legitimate expectation was also questioned, with the case described as an "unfortunate regression" from Council of Civil Service Unions v Minister for the Civil Service, where judges were willing to debate legitimate expectation in a similarly politically sensitive situation. In 2012 the European Court of Human Rights declared a related application inadmissible. In 2016 the Supreme Court of the United Kingdom refused, by three to two, to set aside the 2008 decision for non-disclosure of documents (R (on the application of Bancoult (No 2)) v Secretary of State for Foreign and Commonwealth Affairs). In 2026 the Supreme Court of the BIOT, preferring the dissents of Lords Bingham and Mance, quashed section 9, but stayed the effect of its order pending the government's appeal.

== Facts ==
=== Chagos Islands ===
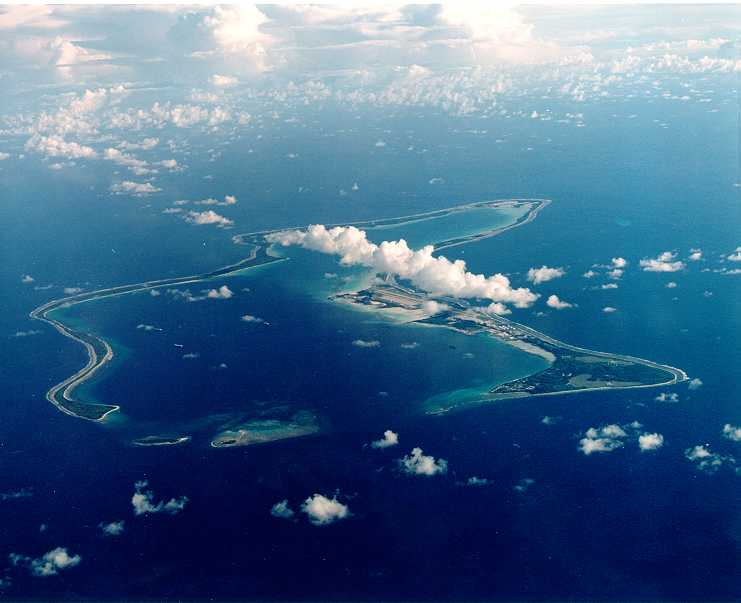
Diego Garcia, now the site of an important US armed forces base.

The Chagos Islands are a cluster of 60 islands and seven atolls in the Indian Ocean. First occupied by lepers from Mauritius, France acquired the islands in the late 18th century, and slaves were brought in from Africa and India to maintain coconut plantations placed there. Following Napoleon's defeat in 1814, the islands were ceded to the British in the Treaty of Paris, who administered them as a dependency of the Colony of Mauritius. After the abolition of slavery in 1833 many of the freed slaves continued to work the plantations, and over time the descendants of slaves and of contract workers recruited from Mauritius and later the Seychelles formed families on the islands; those whose families had lived there for one or more generations were known as the Ilois, and now call themselves Chagossians.

In 1964 the United States, which wanted a military presence in the Indian Ocean and was unwilling that sovereignty over Diego Garcia should pass to an independent "non-aligned" government, began discussions with the British government, which agreed to provide the island for a base. The British Indian Ocean Territory Order 1965, a statutory instrument made under the Colonial Boundaries Act 1895, detached the Chagos Archipelago and some other islands from the colonies of Mauritius and the Seychelles and constituted them a separate colony, the British Indian Ocean Territory (BIOT), on 8 November 1965. This instrument created the office of "Commissioner of BIOT", who was given power to "make laws for the peace, order and good government of the territory". Internal memoranda of 1965–66 showed officials' concern to present the territory as having no permanent inhabitants, so as to avoid reporting on it to the United Nations under Chapter XI of the Charter.

By an exchange of notes dated 30 December 1966 the United Kingdom agreed that the territory, which was to remain under British sovereignty, would be available for the defence needs of both governments for "an indefinitely long period": an initial 50 years, continuing for a further 20 years unless either government gave notice. A confidential Agreed Minute of the same month recorded that the "administrative measures" the United Kingdom would take included "resettling any inhabitants"; it remained confidential until it was disclosed in Bancoult (No 1).

After the United States gave notice that it would need Diego Garcia in July 1971, the Commissioner, using his legislative powers under the 1965 Order, made the Immigration Ordinance 1971 on 16 April 1971, which forbade anyone to enter or remain in the territory without a permit. Lord Hoffmann described the ordinance as "part of the legal façade" denying that there was an indigenous population, but said there was "no evidence that it had ever been used to expel anyone from the islands"; Lord Mance added that it followed "a decision taken in London in or by March 1971 that all the Chagos Islands should be cleared".

Between 1968 and 1971 the population of Diego Garcia was removed, and the remaining islanders on Peros Banhos and the Salomon Islands were evacuated by the middle of 1973. According to Peter Sand, some 1,600 islanders were removed in all. Lord Hoffmann recorded that "No force was used", but that the islanders were told the company was closing down and that unless they accepted transportation elsewhere they would be left without supplies. The Divisional Court rejected the government's explanation that families left Diego Garcia because the plantations closed, holding that "they left because they were required to leave in fulfilment of the 1966 confidential Minute". In the House of Lords it was "accepted by the Secretary of State that the removal and resettlement of the Chagossians was accomplished with a callous disregard of their interests". Under a 1982 agreement the United Kingdom paid £4 million into a trust fund, and about 1,340 Chagossians signed forms renouncing their claims. Diego Garcia continues to play a vital role in US military operations. Following a billion-dollar expansion program, the base has served as a "bomber forward operating location" for offensive operations in Afghanistan and Iraq. A US State Department letter dated 21 June 2000 described it as an "all but indispensable platform".

=== Bancoult (No 1) ===
On 30 September 1998 Olivier Bancoult, a native Chagossian and leader of the Chagos Refugees Group, applied for judicial review of the Immigration Ordinance 1971 and a declaration that it was void. Bancoult sought a writ of certiorari on the grounds that the ordinance was ultra vires and failed the Wednesbury test of reasonableness, as it was irrational.

The case was heard in the Divisional Court by Laws LJ and Gibbs J. Bancoult's argument was made on several grounds: firstly, that the Crown could not exclude a British citizen from British territory, except in times of war, without a valid statutory basis or prerogative power. Secondly, the Chagossians had a constitutional right to inhabit their land under the Magna Carta, one which could not be abridged with delegated legislation, and third, the Commissioner of BIOT's duty to legislate "for the peace, order and good government" of BIOT's inhabitants could not be said to be fulfilled by relocating those inhabitants.

The respondent, the Foreign & Commonwealth Office (FCO), argued that the English courts had no jurisdiction over the case, since the Crown is divisible amongst its territories, and the BIOT had its own courts. According to the FCO, Magna Carta, as a British constitutional document, was inapplicable to the Chagos Islands. They also maintained that "make laws for the peace, order and good government of the Territory" gave the Commissioner a wide enough jurisdiction to account for the order forcibly removing the Chagossians, and that the court could not decide in such a way as to force the government to break its treaty with the United States.

The Divisional Court gave its judgment on 3 November 2000, on three main issues: firstly, the court's right to hear the case; secondly, the Chagossians' constitutional right of residence; and, thirdly, the status of the Commissioner's actions. Laws LJ held that the court had "ample jurisdiction", since the question was whether to quash an instrument "whose making was wholly procured by the United Kingdom government". He considered the argument based on Magna Carta "in the end barren", since it did not decide whether the ordinance was made according to "the law of the land", but, quoting Pollock and Maitland's description of the charter as "the nearest approach to an irrepealable 'fundamental statute' that England has ever had", said that as a proclamation of the rule of law it "may indeed be said to follow the flag - certainly as far as BIOT".

The final section of the judgment was on the legality of the Commissioner's 1971 ordinance. Laws LJ held that it was "elementary" that "a legislature created by a measure passed by a body which is legally prior to it must act within the confines of the power thereby conferred"; in this case that the Commissioner's jurisdiction was to legislate "for the peace, order and good government" of BIOT. While the latitude given to the Commissioner was wide, "peace, order and good government may be a very large tapestry, but every tapestry has a border". The court found that in the 1971 ordinance, the Commissioner had exceeded his authority, and the ordinance was made ultra vires. Therefore, section 4 of the ordinance was quashed.

=== Government response ===
On the day of the judgment, 3 November 2000, the Foreign Secretary, Robin Cook, issued a press release stating: "I have decided to accept the Court's ruling and the Government will not be appealing", and that "we will put in place a new Immigration Ordinance which will allow the Ilois to return to the outer islands while observing our Treaty obligations". The same day the Commissioner revoked the 1971 ordinance and made the Immigration Ordinance 2000, which exempted anyone who was a British Dependent Territories citizen by virtue of a connection with the territory from the permit requirement, except on Diego Garcia. Due to "security issues", the British government was only prepared to let the Chagossians return to the outer islands, which were lacking in basic amenities. No one went to live there; some Chagossians made funded visits to tend family graves.

The government had decided in late 1999 to commission an independent study of the feasibility of resettling the outer islands. A preliminary study was produced on 20 June 2000, and the report on "Phase 2B", published on 10 July 2002, concluded that while resettlement on a short-term subsistence basis was possible, long-term resettlement would be "precarious and costly". Meanwhile, a group action for compensation and for declarations of a right to return, Chagos Islanders v Attorney General, was struck out by Ouseley J on 9 October 2003, and the Court of Appeal refused permission to appeal on 22 July 2004.

=== The 2004 Orders in Council ===
In 2004 newspaper reports in Mauritius suggested that Chagossians and supporters were planning landings on the islands. On 10 June 2004 the Queen in Council made the British Indian Ocean Territory (Constitution) Order 2004, replacing the territory's constitution, and the British Indian Ocean Territory (Immigration) Order 2004. Section 9(1) of the Constitution Order recited that the territory "was constituted and is set aside to be available for the defence purposes" of the United Kingdom and United States governments and provided that "no person has the right of abode in the Territory"; section 9(2) provided that no one was entitled to enter or be present there except as authorised by law. The Immigration Order forbade anyone to enter or be present in the territory without a permit, and made unlawful presence an offence punishable by up to three years' imprisonment or a fine of £3,000. The Orders were made, the Court of Appeal later noted, "a week before this court was to hear the application for permission to appeal from the decision of Ouseley J".

The Orders were announced to Parliament on 15 June 2004 in a written statement by Bill Rammell, the Parliamentary Under-Secretary of State at the Foreign Office, who cited the feasibility report's conclusion that "the costs of maintaining long-term inhabitation are likely to be prohibitive". He continued:

In effect, therefore, anything other than short-term resettlement on a purely subsistence basis would be highly precarious and would involve expensive underwriting by the UK Government for an open-ended period—probably permanently. Accordingly, the Government consider that there would be no purpose in commissioning any further study into the feasibility of resettlement; and that it would be impossible for the Government to promote or even permit resettlement to take place. After long and careful consideration, we have therefore decided to legislate to prevent it.

He added that full immigration control was also necessary "to ensure and maintain the availability and effective use of the territory for defence purposes". In a Commons debate on 7 July 2004 Rammell acknowledged that the decisions of the 1960s and 1970s to depopulate the islands "do not, to say the least, constitute the finest hour of UK foreign policy". On 24 August 2004 Bancoult applied for judicial review to quash section 9 and the Immigration Order, claiming that Cook's statement had created a legitimate expectation (later frustrated by the 2004 orders) and questioning the validity of the Constitution Order 2004, particularly the legality of Section 9.

== Divisional Court ==
The claim was heard in the Divisional Court by Hooper LJ and Cresswell J, who gave judgment on 11 May 2006. Sir Sydney Kentridge QC, with Anthony Bradley and Maya Lester, appeared for Bancoult; John Howell QC and Kieron Beal appeared for the Secretary of State. Hooper LJ noted that the members of the Privy Council present when the Order was made, who "coincidentally" included him, had not considered its merits; in reality the Order was the Secretary of State's. The court said that by section 9 "The Chagossians were thus effectively exiled."

Bancoult argued that the prerogative had never included a power to exclude British subjects from the territory to which they belonged, that Cook's statement had created a legitimate expectation, and that the Orders were irrational. The Secretary of State argued that an Order in Council made for an overseas territory was not justiciable, enjoying at least the same immunity as an Act of Parliament, and that any challenge was barred by the Colonial Laws Validity Act 1865.

Considering irrationality first, and applying the House of Lords' decision in R (Quark Fishing Ltd) v Secretary of State for Foreign and Commonwealth Affairs, the court held that the Orders were made, at least notionally, by the Queen in right of the BIOT, and that their rationality therefore had to be judged by reference to the interests of the BIOT: "The interests of BIOT must be or must primarily be those whose right of abode and unrestricted right to enter and remain was being in effect removed." The only justification given in section 9 itself was the defence purposes of the United Kingdom and the United States; the Order was therefore "on its face, not concerned with the interests of BIOT", and was irrational. It declined to consider the government's second reason, that resettlement was not feasible, because the Order did not give it.

On the scope of the power, the court said that the suggestion "that a minister can, through the means of an Order in Council, exile a whole population from a British Overseas Territory and claim that he is doing so for the "peace, order and good government" of the Territory is, to us, repugnant", but it did not decide that question, nor whether there was a prerogative power to banish, leaving them to a higher court. On reviewability, it held that, under Council of Civil Service Unions v Minister for the Civil Service, the decisive element was not the origin of the power (in this case, the royal prerogative) but its subject matter, and that the government's case involved "much clanking of the "chains of the ghosts of the past""; the decision was in reality the Secretary of State's and subject to judicial review in the ordinary way. The Colonial Laws Validity Act did not apply, because the challenge was not one of repugnancy to English law. By its order, sealed on 16 May 2006, the court quashed section 9 and declared that section 5(1) of the Immigration Order could not lawfully be applied to Chagossian British Overseas Territories citizens and their families, except in respect of Diego Garcia.

== Court of Appeal ==
The Secretary of State's appeal was heard by Sir Anthony Clarke MR, Waller LJ and Sedley LJ on 5–7 and 13–16 February 2007, and dismissed unanimously on 23 May 2007, each judge giving a separate judgment. Before the Court of Appeal, counsel for the Secretary of State accepted that the Orders had been made by the Queen in right of the BIOT rather than of the United Kingdom.

=== Sedley LJ ===
Sedley LJ, giving the leading judgment, held that the Colonial Laws Validity Act 1865 laid down a rule "of priority, not of powers", and did not bar a challenge to whether an Order in Council was valid law in the first place. An Order in Council "is an act of the executive", and to hold otherwise would create "an area of ministerial action free both of Parliamentary control and of judicial oversight"; he concluded that "the use of the prerogative power of colonial governance enjoys no generic immunity from judicial review".

On the merits, Sedley LJ analysed the case as one of abuse of power. He held that the administration of the remaining colonies could not be "an Alsatia where the rule of law does not run", and that "the permanent exclusion of an entire population from its homeland for reasons unconnected with their collective wellbeing" could not be an act of governance and so could not lawfully be done under the prerogative. He called the prospective cost of resettlement to the taxpayer "a mare's nest", since no one suggested that the United Kingdom was obliged to fund it: "The point is that the two Orders in Council negate one of the most fundamental liberties known to human beings, the freedom to return to one's homeland, however poor and barren the conditions of life".

As a "second and separate reason", Sedley LJ held that the Orders frustrated the legitimate expectation created by Cook's statement, which fell into the third category identified in R v North and East Devon Health Authority, ex parte Coughlan, a lawful promise of a substantive benefit. The statement was not conditional on feasibility, and nothing had been shown to have changed between 2000 and 2004. He concluded that both the content of the Orders and the circumstances of their enactment "constitute an abuse of power on the part of executive government".

=== Waller LJ ===
Waller LJ agreed with Sedley LJ on the 1865 Act but rested his decision on legitimate expectation, expressing no opinion on the width of the prerogative to remove people from a conquered or ceded territory. He held that Cook's statement gave "the clear impression that any dispute was over and that the Ilois would be able to return long-term", and that there had been "no change of circumstance" by 2004. He observed that for Orders in Council "there is simply no opportunity for debate at all and no opportunity for scrutiny", so that if regulations could be set aside for procedural impropriety, "the more so" could decisions to act by Order in Council.

=== Sir Anthony Clarke MR ===
Sir Anthony Clarke MR held that the GCHQ principle, that reviewability depends on a prerogative power's subject matter rather than its source, applied to all Orders in Council, and no national security issue had been raised. He agreed with Waller LJ and Sedley LJ that the Orders frustrated a legitimate expectation without any overriding interest, the circumstances in 2004 being "essentially the same as in 2000". He would not go so far as Sedley LJ in holding that the Crown's powers did not extend to exiling a whole population, and considered that the executive could have regard to the interests of the United Kingdom as well as those of the Chagossians; but he agreed that the Orders were an abuse of power because "they did not have proper regard for the interests of the Chagossians".

== House of Lords ==
=== Hearing ===
The Secretary of State appealed to the House of Lords, where the case was heard by Lords Hoffmann, Bingham, Rodger, Carswell and Mance on 30 June and 1, 2 and 3 July 2008; judgment was given on 22 October 2008. Jonathan Crow QC and Kieron Beal appeared for the Secretary of State, and Sir Sydney Kentridge QC, Anthony Bradley and Maya Lester for Bancoult. It was common ground that the territory was a ceded colony for which the Queen in Council had plenary power to legislate. Lord Hoffmann rejected as "extreme propositions" both Crow's argument that such an Order could not be reviewed and Kentridge's that only an Act of Parliament could remove the right of abode. Unlike the courts below, the House proceeded on the common ground that the Order was made in right of the United Kingdom.

=== Reviewability of prerogative Orders in Council ===
All five Law Lords held that the Order was open to judicial review. Lord Hoffmann accepted that a prerogative Order in Council is primary legislation "in the sense that the legislative power of the Crown is original and not subordinate", but held that it does not share all the characteristics of an Act of Parliament. He stated:

The principle of the sovereignty of Parliament, as it has been developed by the courts over the past 350 years, is founded upon the unique authority Parliament derives from its representative character. An exercise of the prerogative lacks this quality; although it may be legislative in character, it is still an exercise of power by the executive alone. Until the decision of this House in Council of Civil Service Unions v Minister for the Civil Service [1985] AC 374, it may have been assumed that the exercise of prerogative powers was, as such, immune from judicial review. That objection being removed, I see no reason why prerogative legislation should not be subject to review on ordinary principles of legality, rationality and procedural impropriety in the same way as any other executive action. Mr Crow rightly pointed out that the Council of Civil Service Unions case was not concerned with the validity of a prerogative order but with an executive decision made pursuant to powers conferred by such an order. That is a ground upon which, if your Lordships were inclined to distinguish the case, it would be open to you to do so. But I see no reason for making such a distinction.

Lords Rodger, Carswell and Mance agreed, and Lord Bingham accepted that, if the power existed, section 9 was "susceptible in principle to review by the courts".

=== Colonial Laws Validity Act 1865 ===
The Law Lords divided on the effect of the 1865 Act, which provides that no "colonial law", including a law made for a colony by the Queen in Council, is void for repugnancy to the law of England unless it conflicts with an Act of Parliament extending to the colony. Lord Hoffmann held that the Act dealt with the validity of colonial laws as part of the local legal system, and that from the point of view of the United Kingdom courts' review of the prerogative the Constitution Order was not a colonial law; Lord Mance agreed. Lord Rodger, with whom Lord Carswell agreed, held that the Act did prevent any challenge on the ground that the Orders were repugnant to a "fundamental principle" of English law that a "belonger" could not be sent out of the territory, but not challenges on other grounds such as irrationality or legitimate expectation.

=== Scope of the prerogative and the right of abode ===
The majority held that the Crown's legislative power over a ceded colony extended to removing the right of abode. Lord Hoffmann accepted that the Crown cannot exile a subject from the United Kingdom without statutory authority, but held that "In a ceded colony, however, the Crown has plenary legislative authority. It can make or unmake the law of the land." The right of abode was "a creature of the law. The law gives it and the law may take it away", and although it was an important right, "The language of section 9 of the Constitution Order could hardly be clearer." In a conflict between the colony's interests and those of the United Kingdom, "she is entitled, on the advice of Her United Kingdom ministers, to prefer the interests of the United Kingdom"; he therefore "entirely" rejected the Divisional Court's reasoning. He also held that the words "peace, order and good government" do not limit a legislature's power, and that so far as Bancoult (No 1) held otherwise "it was wrongly decided".

Lord Rodger proceeded on the basis that chapter 29 of Magna Carta applied in the BIOT, but held that since the Orders were themselves part of the territory's law, it did not make any banishment under them unlawful. Whether legislation conduced to "peace, order and good government" was not justiciable: "the sanction for inappropriate use of the legislative power is political, not judicial". Lord Carswell, agreeing "with very little qualification", said that a court could not strike down an Order as not being for peace, order and good government without challenging "what is essentially a political judgment".

Lord Bingham held that the existence and extent of a prerogative power was for the courts, by a historical inquiry. "The House was referred to no instance in which the royal prerogative had been exercised to exile an indigenous population from its homeland," and he cited Sir William Holdsworth's statement that "The Crown has never had a prerogative power to prevent its subjects from entering the kingdom, or to expel them from it." Parliament could have legislated to the effect of section 9, "but not without public debate in Parliament and democratic decision". He concluded "that there was no royal prerogative power to make an order in council containing section 9, and it is accordingly void".

Lord Mance, whose reasons Lord Bingham adopted, held that the inhabitants of a ceded territory acquire the same constitutional right of abode as citizens of the United Kingdom, and rejected the government's argument as coming "close to treating them as if they were aliens". He held that "A constitution which exiles a territory's inhabitants is a contradiction in terms", that no precedent had been shown for using the prerogative to exclude a colony's inhabitants, and that the prerogative "did not extend to enacting legislation aimed at depriving BIOT of its inhabitants' right to enter and be present there".

=== Rationality ===
On rationality, Lord Hoffmann said that one must consider what the rights actually were in 2004: "the deed has been done, the wrong confessed, compensation agreed and paid", no one had gone to live on the islands while the 2000 Ordinance was in force, and the right of abode was therefore "purely symbolic". He described the litigation as "the continuation of protest by other means", and said that "Funding is the subtext of what this case is about": the government was entitled to prevent an unauthorised settlement being used to press it into funding resettlement, and to consider the United States' security concerns. Policy on public expenditure and on security and diplomatic interests was "peculiarly within the competence of the executive", and it was "quite impossible to say" that the decision was unreasonable or an abuse of power.

Lord Rodger held that the report's advice that permanent resettlement would be "prohibitive" was "an entirely legitimate factor", reinforced by defence considerations and the security situation after the September 11 attacks. The government was entitled to give weight to the wider interests of the United Kingdom, and "judges are not well placed to second-guess the balance struck by ministers". Lord Carswell agreed, observing that, even if the United States' concerns appeared exaggerated, decisions about how far to accommodate them were for ministers, and that courts "should be more than a little slow to pin that butterfly to the wheel".

Lord Bingham held that section 9 was irrational because "there was, quite simply, no good reason for making it". Resettlement had not been seen as a threat to the base in 2000, and despite "highly imaginative letters written by American officials to strengthen the Secretary of State's hand in this litigation" there was no credible reason to think the security situation had changed; little consideration had been given to the Chagossians "whose constitution it was to be"; and "the smaller its practical value the less reason to take it away". Lord Mance, in the alternative, held that the government had given no real weight to the right of abode, had consulted no one, and had relied on considerations directed at "a remote and unlikely risk of large scale resettlement". Answering the majority's view that the right was symbolic, he wrote: "Symbols can themselves be important ... Recognition of a wrong can be as valuable as, sometimes valued more than, concrete compensation."

=== Legitimate expectation ===
Lord Hoffmann held that a claim to a legitimate expectation in such a case could be based only on a promise "clear, unambiguous and devoid of relevant qualification", and that detrimental reliance was "not essential", though relevant. He held that the claim "falls at the first hurdle": Cook's statement was made against the background of the feasibility study, contained "no promises about what, in such a case, would happen in the long term", and came "nowhere near a promise" that immigration control would not be reimposed if resettlement proved infeasible. Even if it could, the change was justified in the public interest, the decision lying in the "macro-political field". Lord Rodger agreed, holding that the statement could not be read as a clear promise that the Chagossians could "return and settle permanently on the outer islands". Lord Carswell agreed, adding that the absence of detrimental reliance would in any case weigh against a remedy.

Lord Bingham held that there was "a clear and unambiguous representation, devoid of relevant qualification" that the Chagossians could return to the outer islands unless treaty obligations later forbade it, from which the government could not resile without compelling reason; reliance or detriment need not be shown. Lord Mance held that the press release "should be construed according to the ordinary meaning that would be attached to it by those, principally the Chagossians and their supporters, to whom it was directed", and that so read it was "an unconditional recognition" of a legal right to enter and be present. He held that "specific detriment is not an absolute pre-condition", and that it was maladministration to go back on the 2000 resolution "without any consultation and without strong cause".

=== Human rights and international law ===
Lord Hoffmann held that the European Convention on Human Rights had never been extended to the BIOT: the United Kingdom's 1953 declaration under Article 56 (then Article 63) extending it to Mauritius lapsed on Mauritian independence, and no declaration had been made for the BIOT, which had been "a new political entity" since 1965. The Human Rights Act therefore had no application, and international law, not forming part of domestic law, could not invalidate the Order. Lord Rodger and Lord Carswell agreed on these points, and Lord Mance agreed that the Act and Convention had no role, but left open whether international law might be relevant to the exercise or review of the prerogative.

=== Outcome ===
Holdings of the Law Lords on the main issues
| Issue | Lord Hoffmann | Lord Rodger | Lord Carswell | Lord Bingham | Lord Mance |
|---|---|---|---|---|---|
| Orders in Council reviewable | Yes (para. 35) | Yes (para. 105) | Yes (para. 122) | Yes (para. 71) | Yes (para. 141) |
| Prerogative power to make section 9 | Yes (paras. 44–45) | Yes (paras. 109, 117) | Yes (paras. 124, 130) | No (para. 71) | No (para. 160) |
| Section 9 irrational | No (para. 58) | No (para. 113) | No (para. 132) | Yes (para. 72) | Yes (paras. 183–186) |
| Legitimate expectation defeated | No (paras. 61–63) | No (para. 115) | No (paras. 134–135) | Yes (para. 73) | Yes (para. 185) |

The House allowed the appeal, set aside the orders of the Divisional Court and the Court of Appeal, and dismissed the application for judicial review. Lord Carswell said he reached his conclusion not "through any lack of sympathy with the Chagossians", who "were undoubtedly treated very shabbily", but because the courts must apply the law impartially. Lord Mance ended his dissent by quoting the Duke of Norfolk's response to his banishment in Shakespeare's Richard II, "A heavy sentence, my most sovereign liege".

== Subsequent history ==
=== European Court of Human Rights (2012) ===
An application lodged on 20 September 2004 on behalf of 1,786 Chagossians, Chagos Islanders v United Kingdom, was declared inadmissible by the Fourth Section of the European Court of Human Rights on 11 December 2012. The court summarised the House of Lords' decision, including its holding that the Article 56 declaration made for Mauritius lapsed on independence. It held that no declaration had ever extended the Convention to the BIOT, and that "It is therefore incontrovertible that at no time was the right of individual petition extended to BIOT." It also held that the applicants' claims had been settled by the 1982 compensation, and that their later litigation "must be regarded, as held by the House of Lords, to be part of an overall campaign to bring pressure to bear on Government policy rather than disclosing any new situation".

=== Application to set aside (2016) ===
In 2012 documents about the drafting of the Phase 2B feasibility report, known as the "Rashid documents", were disclosed in the separate Bancoult (No 3) litigation, and Bancoult applied to the Supreme Court to set aside the 2008 decision on the ground that the government had breached its duty of candour. The application was heard on 22 June 2015, with Edward Fitzgerald QC and Amal Clooney among Bancoult's counsel, and dismissed by three to two on 29 June 2016.

Lord Mance, who had not changed his view of the 2008 appeal, held that the court was bound by the majority's legal reasoning, and that the non-disclosure, though culpable, was not intentional. Because the report's General Conclusions were unchanged from draft to final version, there was no likelihood that the material would have shown it to be irrational to rely on them. He added that a new feasibility study by KPMG, published in 2015, had found scope for supported resettlement: "In practical terms, the background has shifted, and logically the constitutional ban needs to be revisited", and the government accepted that any Chagossian could challenge a failure to abrogate the 2004 Orders. Lord Neuberger agreed, and Lord Clarke, who had sat in the Court of Appeal and preferred the reasoning of the minority in 2008, "reluctantly" agreed. Lord Kerr, with whom Lady Hale agreed, dissented, holding that "the appeal might well have been decided differently" had the documents been disclosed, and describing the non-disclosure as "a grievous oversight".

=== Challenge to the 2016 resettlement decision (2019–2020) ===
On 16 November 2016 the government announced that it would not support resettlement of the Chagossians, offering instead a support package of about £40 million over ten years. Bancoult and Solange Hoareau challenged that decision; the 2004 Orders themselves, which had been upheld in Bancoult (No 2), were not challenged. The Divisional Court held itself bound by the House of Lords' ruling that the Convention and the Human Rights Act did not apply, and dismissed the claims. The Court of Appeal dismissed an appeal on 30 July 2020, rejecting the argument that the Bancoult (No 2) analysis of Article 56 had been superseded by the 2019 advisory opinion of the International Court of Justice and the following General Assembly resolution.

=== International Court of Justice (2019) ===
In its advisory opinion of 25 February 2019 on the separation of the Chagos Archipelago from Mauritius, the International Court of Justice recorded that the Court of Appeal had upheld the High Court's decision that the 2004 Orders were invalid because "their content and the circumstances of their adoption constituted an abuse of power by the United Kingdom Government", and that the House of Lords had upheld the government's appeal on 22 October 2008.

=== Supreme Court of the British Indian Ocean Territory (2026) ===
In February 2026 four Chagossians, including Misley Mandarin, landed without permits on Île du Coin and sought judicial review in the Supreme Court of the BIOT of the removal notices issued to them; the court held that it could consider the lawfulness of section 9. In a judgment of 31 March 2026 the Chief Justice, James Lewis KC, characterised the majority's decision in Bancoult (No 2) as "based on pragmatic reasons" centred on defence and the cost of resettlement. Agreeing with the speeches of Lords Bingham and Mance, he held that "There is no historical authority for a prerogative power to expel or permanently exclude a population of British subjects from the territory to which their citizenship belongs". He also held that the 2025 treaty with Mauritius had removed the defence and funding reasons relied on by the majority: "It follows I prefer the reasoning of the minority in Bancoult No.2 and would apply that in this court." He quashed section 9 as "an unlawful and irrational exercise of the prerogative", while holding that the claimants had entered and remained in the territory illegally and that the permit requirement in the Immigration Order remained valid.

The court's order, dated 31 March 2026, declared section 9 unlawful and quashed it, but granted the Commissioner permission to appeal and provided that the effects of those parts of the order "are to be stayed pending final determination of the Defendant's appeal before the Court of Appeal". The appeal was listed before the BIOT Court of Appeal for 15–17 July 2026.

== Significance ==
The case established that prerogative Orders in Council, including those legislating for overseas territories, are subject to judicial review on ordinary grounds, a point on which all five Law Lords agreed; in 2026 the Supreme Court of the BIOT described it as a proposition that "should not be in doubt". In Julie McBride's assessment, the case also raised questions about the oversight of Orders in Council, since it showed that the courts are unwilling to review a piece of executive legislation where there are political elements in play, and raised "the classic problem of balancing human rights issues and concerns relating to security and defence".

The public and academic reaction to the decision was negative. Thomas Poole considered that the Law Lords had failed in their duty as members of the judiciary: "where old principles no longer fit contemporary constitutional and moral standards, why should we follow them? Surely the judicial task is to rework things like neo-imperial texts and outdated legal attitudes to the prerogative in order to cure obvious injustices and to vindicate a modern conception of the rule of law". Margit Cohn agreed, writing on the legitimate expectation issue that "It is difficult to accept that a public statement made by a Secretary of State, followed by the promulgation of an order that removed the previous prohibition to return, could not have created at least some sort of expectation". Cohn further described the case as an "unfortunate regression" from the GCHQ case, where judges had been willing to debate legitimate expectation in a similarly politically sensitive situation. T. T. Arvind went further, drawing parallels with the judicial response to the Zong massacre to argue that the decision, despite its formalist rhetoric, was in reality a pragmatic one which abandoned centuries of settled constitutional jurisprudence in relation to the limited scope of the Royal Prerogative.

== See also ==
- Expulsion of the Chagossians
- Chagos Archipelago sovereignty dispute
- R v Secretary of State for Foreign and Commonwealth Affairs, ex p Bancoult (No 1)
- R (Bancoult) v Secretary of State for Foreign and Commonwealth Affairs (No 3)
- Chagos Islanders v United Kingdom
- Royal prerogative in the United Kingdom

== Sources ==
=== Court decisions ===
- R v Secretary of State for the Foreign and Commonwealth Office, ex parte Bancoult, EWHC (Admin) 413 (High Court (Divisional Court) 3 November 2000).
- R (Bancoult) v Secretary of State for Foreign and Commonwealth Affairs, EWHC (Admin) 1038 (High Court (Divisional Court) 11 May 2006).
- R (Bancoult) v Secretary of State for Foreign and Commonwealth Affairs, EWCA Civ 498 (Court of Appeal 23 May 2007).
- R (Bancoult) v Secretary of State for Foreign and Commonwealth Affairs (No 2), UKHL 61 (House of Lords 22 October 2008).
- Chagos Islanders v United Kingdom, Application no. 35622/04 (European Court of Human Rights 11 December 2012).
- R (Bancoult No 2) v Secretary of State for Foreign and Commonwealth Affairs, UKSC 35 (Supreme Court 29 June 2016).
- R (Hoareau and Bancoult) v Secretary of State for Foreign and Commonwealth Affairs, EWHC (Admin) 221 (High Court (Divisional Court) 8 February 2019).
- R (Hoareau and Bancoult) v Secretary of State for Foreign and Commonwealth Affairs, EWCA Civ 1010 (Court of Appeal 30 July 2020).
- Legal Consequences of the Separation of the Chagos Archipelago from Mauritius in 1965, Advisory Opinion (PDF). I.C.J. Reports 2019. International Court of Justice. 25 February 2019. p. 95.
- R (Mandarin and others) v HM Commissioner for the British Indian Ocean Territory (Supreme Court of the British Indian Ocean Territory 31 March 2026), Text.
- R (Mandarin and others) v HM Commissioner for the British Indian Ocean Territory: Order (Supreme Court of the British Indian Ocean Territory 31 March 2026), Text.
- "Cause list, 15–17 July 2026: HM Commissioner for the British Indian Ocean Territory v The King (on the application of Mandarin & Ors), [2026] BIOT CA (Civ) 1" (PDF). British Indian Ocean Territory Court of Appeal. 2026.

=== Official documents ===
- Rammell, Bill (15 June 2004). "British Indian Ocean Territory (written ministerial statement)". Hansard, House of Commons. pp. 32WS–34WS.

=== Books and journals ===
- Allen, Stephen (2007). "Looking beyond the Bancoult cases: international law and the prospect of resettling the Chagos Islands". Human Rights Law Review. 7 (3): 441–482. doi:10.1093/hrlr/ngm014. ISSN 1744-1021.
- Allen, Stephen (2008). "International law and the resettlement of the (outer) Chagos Islands". Human Rights Law Review. 8 (4): 683–702. doi:10.1093/hrlr/ngn024. ISSN 1744-1021.
- Arvind, T.T. (2012). "'Though it shocks one very much': Formalism and Pragmatism in the Zong and Bancoult". Oxford Journal of Legal Studies. 32 (1): 113–151. doi:10.1093/ojls/gqr030. ISSN 0143-6503.
- Cohn, Margit (2009). "Judicial review of non-statutory executive powers after Bancoult: a unified anxious model". Public Law. 2009 (April). ISSN 0033-3565.
- Elliott, Mark; Amanda Perreau-Saussine (2009). "Pyrrhic public law: Bancoult and the sources, status and content of common law limitations on prerogative power". Public Law. 2009 (October). ISSN 0033-3565.
- Jeffery, Laura (2006). "Historical Narrative and Legal Evidence: Judging Chagossians' High Court Testimonies". Political and Legal Anthropology Review. 29 (2): 228–253. doi:10.1525/pol.2006.29.2.228. ISSN 1081-6976.
- McBride, Julie (2009). ""The Law Gives It And The Law May Take It Away": The Repercussions of Bancoult (No. 2)". Cambridge Student Law Review. 5 (1). ISSN 1750-0893.
- Moules, Richard. "Judicial review of prerogative Orders in Council". Cambridge Law Journal. 68 (1). ISSN 0008-1973.
- Nauvel, Christian (2006). "A Return from Exile in Sight? The Chagossians and Their Struggle". Northwestern Journal of International Human Rights. 5 (1). ISSN 1549-828X.
- Palmer, Stephanie (2001). ""They Made a Desert and Called It Peace": Banishment and the Royal Prerogative". Cambridge Law Journal. 60 (2): 231–264. doi:10.1017/S0008197301630629. ISSN 0008-1973.
- Poole, Thomas (2010). "The royal prerogative". International Journal of Constitutional Law. 8 (1). doi:10.1093/icon/mop038. ISSN 1474-2640.
- Sand, Peter H. (2009). "R (on the application of Bancoult) v Secretary of State for Foreign and Commonwealth Affairs [2008] UKHL 61, 4 All E.R. 1055 (2008)". American Journal of International Law. 103 (1): 317–324. doi:10.2307/20535155. ISSN 0002-9300. JSTOR 20535155.
