= R (on the application of Bancoult (No 2)) v Secretary of State for Foreign and Commonwealth Affairs =

2016 UK Supreme Court decision refusing to set aside Bancoult (No 2)

- Court: Supreme Court of the United Kingdom
- Full case name: R (on the application of Bancoult (No 2)) v Secretary of State for Foreign and Commonwealth Affairs
- Argued: 22 June 2015
- Decided: 29 June 2016
- Neutral citation: [2016] UKSC 35
- Reported at: [2017] AC 300; [2016] 3 WLR 157; [2016] HRLR 16; [2016] WLR(D) 344

Case history
- Prior history: R (Bancoult) v Secretary of State for Foreign and Commonwealth Affairs (No 2) [2008] UKHL 61
- Subsequent history: Bancoult (No 3) [2018] UKSC 3; R (Hoareau and Bancoult) v Secretary of State for Foreign and Commonwealth Affairs [2019] EWHC 221 (Admin), [2020] EWCA Civ 1010

Holding
- Application to set aside the House of Lords' 2008 decision for non-disclosure dismissed, 3–2. The late-disclosed documents did not show that it was, or may well have been, irrational for the Secretary of State to rely on the General Conclusions of the 2002 feasibility study, which were unchanged between draft and final versions.

Court membership
- Judges sitting: Lord Neuberger (President), Lady Hale (Deputy President), Lord Mance, Lord Kerr, Lord Clarke

Case opinions
- Majority: Lord Mance, joined by Lord Neuberger, Lord Clarke
- Concurrence: Lord Clarke
- Dissent: Lord Kerr, joined by Lady Hale
- Dissent: Lady Hale

Keywords
- Chagossians; right of abode; feasibility study; non-disclosure

Area of law
- Judicial review; duty of candour; reopening of final appeals; British Overseas Territories

R (on the application of Bancoult (No 2)) v Secretary of State for Foreign and Commonwealth Affairs [2016] UKSC 35, often called Bancoult (No 4), was a 2016 decision of the Supreme Court of the United Kingdom refusing, by three votes to two, to set aside the House of Lords' 2008 judgment in R v Secretary of State for Foreign and Commonwealth Affairs, ex parte Bancoult (No 2). That judgment had upheld the 2004 Order in Council removing any right of abode in the British Indian Ocean Territory (BIOT), which prevents the Chagossians from returning to live there. The application, brought by Olivier Bancoult, was based on the government's failure to disclose documents about the drafting of the 2002 feasibility study on resettlement, on which the House of Lords' majority had relied. The documents came to light in 2012, in separate litigation over the Chagos Marine Protected Area.

The government accepted that the failure to disclose the documents was culpable, though not intentional. Giving the majority judgment, Lord Mance, who had dissented in 2008, held that the documents would not have shown it irrational for the government to rely on the study, because its General Conclusions had not changed from draft to final version. He also held that a new feasibility study published by KPMG in 2015 meant that "the background has shifted, and logically the constitutional ban needs to be revisited". Lord Neuberger agreed, and Lord Clarke agreed "reluctantly".

Lord Kerr and Lady Hale dissented. They would have reopened the appeal, holding that the documents showed the study's conditional forecast of flooding had been turned into a firm prediction and that the appeal "might well have been decided differently". Five months after the judgment, the government decided against resettlement. A challenge to that decision relying on the majority's remarks about revisiting the ban failed.

== Background ==
=== Expulsion and earlier litigation ===
Between 1968 and 1973 the United Kingdom procured the removal of the Chagossians from the BIOT, to make way for a United States base on Diego Garcia. Lord Hoffmann said that it had been carried out with "a callous disregard of their interests". In 1982 the government paid £4 million into a trust fund in Mauritius, which most Chagossians accepted in settlement of their claims. In 2000, in Bancoult (No 1), the Divisional Court quashed the 1971 immigration ordinance that had excluded the islanders. The Foreign Secretary, Robin Cook, accepted the decision and announced a second stage of a study into the feasibility of resettlement.

=== The 2002 feasibility study ===
The second stage was carried out by the consultants Posford Haskoning, whose "stage 2B" report was published in July 2002. Its General Conclusions read, in part:

To conclude, whilst it may be feasible to resettle the islands in the short-term, the costs of maintaining long-term inhabitation are likely to be prohibitive. Even in the short-term, natural events such as periodic flooding from storms and seismic activity are likely to make life difficult for a resettled population.

The Divisional Court in Bancoult (No 2) summarised the report as finding that long-term resettlement would be "precarious and costly". In the light of the report the government did not commission the planned cost-benefit stage. On 10 June 2004 it made the British Indian Ocean Territory (Constitution) Order 2004, section 9 of which provides that no person has the right of abode in the territory.

=== Bancoult (No 2) in the House of Lords ===
Bancoult's challenge to section 9 succeeded in the Divisional Court and the Court of Appeal, but on 22 October 2008 the House of Lords allowed the government's appeal by three to two. The majority, Lord Hoffmann, Lord Rodger and Lord Carswell, held that the decision to remove the right of abode was neither irrational nor an abuse of power; Lord Bingham and Lord Mance dissented. No one had challenged the stage 2B report in those proceedings: the Chagossians' counsel expressly disclaimed any challenge to it, arguing only that its findings did not justify the 2004 Order.

The majority used the report's findings, to differing extents, in their reasoning. Lord Hoffmann described the right of abode as "purely symbolic", given that it could not be exercised without government funding, and called the litigation "the continuation of protest by other means". Lord Rodger and Lord Carswell also relied on the report's findings on cost and practicality.

== Discovery of the documents ==
In 2005 and 2006 Bancoult's solicitors asked for the draft of the stage 2B report and officials' comments on it; the Treasury Solicitor found a draft of the earlier preliminary study but said that no draft of the stage 2B report could be found, and the Foreign and Commonwealth Office (FCO) later said that it had kept no copy.

In 2010 the government declared a marine protected area (MPA) around the islands, and Bancoult challenged it in Bancoult (No 3). After a further search requested by his solicitors, the Treasury Solicitor found, in archived files of the Bancoult (No 2) litigation, documents about the drafting of the stage 2B report that the FCO no longer held. They were produced, without commentary, as exhibits to a witness statement dated 1 May 2012 by Zaqia Rashid of the Treasury Solicitor's department, in the Bancoult (No 3) proceedings, and became known as the "Rashid documents".

The documents included a draft of the report's executive summary; a note of a meeting between officials and the consultants on 6 March 2002; correspondence with the FCO's scientific adviser, Charles Sheppard, and with the consultants; and details of the changes made to the draft. The study itself was not among the undisclosed material: it had been published and relied on throughout.

Bancoult tried to raise the non-disclosure in Bancoult (No 3), but the Divisional Court held in June 2013 that the feasibility study had played no part in the decision to create the MPA.

== The application ==
On 5 December 2013 Bancoult asked the government to agree that the 2008 judgment should be set aside by consent; it refused on 5 January 2014. Legal aid was granted on 29 September 2014, and the application was filed on 9 January 2015. The Supreme Court, consisting of Lord Neuberger (President), Lady Hale (Deputy President), Lord Mance, Lord Kerr and Lord Clarke, heard it on 22 June 2015. Edward Fitzgerald QC, Paul Harris SC and Amal Clooney appeared for Bancoult; Steven Kovats QC, Kieron Beal QC and Julian Blake appeared for the Secretary of State.

=== Bancoult's case ===
Bancoult argued that the Secretary of State had breached his duty of candour by failing to disclose documents likely to have affected the factual basis of the House of Lords' decision. He said the documents would have shown that the report had been extensively altered to reflect FCO views; that Sheppard had criticised the draft; that Sheppard's input lacked objectivity; and that changes between draft and final versions distorted the consultants' findings on storms. He submitted that the documents would certainly have led to a challenge to the report, that the challenge would very probably have succeeded, and that a new hearing would reach a different result.

He also relied on new material, including a letter from Stephen Akester, a sub-contractor on the study who disagreed with its conclusion, and a 2012 review of the study by Professor Paul Kench of the University of Auckland.

=== The Secretary of State's case ===
The Secretary of State accepted that the documents should have been located and disclosed, and that the failures were "highly regrettable", but there was no basis for attributing them to deliberate misconduct. He argued that the application was academic, because a new feasibility study, which included Diego Garcia, would inform future policy. He also argued that there had been undue delay in making the application.

=== The test ===
Both parties agreed that the applicant had to show that the non-disclosure probably had, or may well have had, a decisive effect on the outcome. The court's inherent jurisdiction, as described in R v Bow Street Metropolitan Stipendiary Magistrate, ex p Pinochet Ugarte (No 2), allowed it to correct an injustice where a party had been subjected to an unfair procedure, but not merely because the earlier decision was thought wrong.

== Judgment ==
=== Majority: Lord Mance ===
Lord Mance, with whom Lord Neuberger and Lord Clarke agreed, noted that he had dissented in 2008 and had not changed his view. But the question was not whether the 2008 decision was wrong in law; the court was "strictly bound" by the majority's legal reasoning, since the application was made in the same proceedings. He held that "That the failure to disclose the Rashid documents in the Bancoult No 2 proceedings was culpable is not, and could not be, disputed", but accepted that it was not intentional and involved no bad faith.

On the test, he left open whether, after a party's own failure to disclose, a test lower than probability might apply, such as whether the breach "may well" have had a decisive effect; he said that the outcome did not depend on which test was used.

==== The drafting process ====
The consultants' contract provided for comments on a draft before the final report, so changes after comments by the FCO and BIOT were neither surprising nor "in any way unnatural". The note of the 6 March 2002 meeting recorded the FCO as having "hoped that Phase II would negate the need for Phase III", and as hoping that the climate change section would "resolve its difficulties"; but in his view the note showed, if anything, that the FCO expected a report accepting some form of resettlement, and that the consultants were "well capable of standing up for what it believed correct". Reading all the exchanges, he found that "nothing in them suggests anything but a proper, professionally oriented and independent process".

==== The changes to the report ====
The central point for Lord Mance was that the General Conclusions, on which the House of Lords' majority had relied, were in identical terms in the draft and the final report. So was the "Vulnerability" section on which they were based. In the executive summary's section on climate change, the draft had said that the islands lay "just north of an active cyclone belt" and that a small northward shift of the belt could lead to frequent cyclones; the final version dropped this and said instead that storm impacts, including storm surge floods and shore erosion, were "predicted to increase".

Lord Mance held that the cyclone passage had not been removed from the report, since it remained in the body of the study. The new sentences followed from the opening statement shared by both versions, and Sheppard had endorsed the report's climate findings and thought them, if anything, understated. Sheppard had criticised the consultants for going on "a lot about cyclones and earthquakes", and Lord Mance thought this view "quite probably" explained the removal of the cyclone reference from the summary. He found the other changes insignificant. He rejected the suggestion that Sheppard's input lacked objectivity, describing him as "a forthright and very independent character".

==== Conclusion on the documents ====
Lord Mance doubted whether Bancoult's advisers would in fact have challenged the report, but assumed that they would have. Treating the Secretary of State as knowing everything the executive held in June 2004, he asked whether a court would probably, or might well, have found it irrational to rely on the General Conclusions. He held that, since the General Conclusions and the Vulnerability section were unaltered, there was "no probability, likelihood or prospect (and, for completeness, in my view also no real possibility)" of such a finding.

Akester's and Kench's views did not change this: they were outside anything the executive knew in 2004, and the issue was whether the Secretary of State acted rationally on the material then available, not whether the report's conclusions were sustainable now.

==== The KPMG study and the MPA ====
Lord Mance identified one further factor, which he said would have been "decisive" even if the threshold test had been met. A new feasibility study published by KPMG in March 2015 assessed the risks differently and, taking account for the first time of resettlement on Diego Garcia, found scope for supported resettlement. He continued:

In practical terms, the background has shifted, and logically the constitutional ban needs to be revisited.

He recorded that Kovats had accepted in oral argument that any Chagossian could challenge the failure to abrogate the 2004 Orders in the light of all the information now available, and held that this militated "strongly" against reopening a case about "a factually superseded study report". Relying on the government's statement in the Bancoult (No 3) proceedings, he added that the MPA did not preclude resettlement, and that if the government decided against resettlement, Bancoult could in principle challenge that refusal by judicial review.

=== Lord Clarke ===
Lord Clarke, who had sat in the Court of Appeal that decided in Bancoult's favour and preferred the reasoning of the 2008 minority, "reluctantly concluded" that Lord Mance's analysis was to be preferred. One reason was that the decision was "not the end of the road": he agreed that the KPMG study was conclusive, and noted the government's acceptance that its future decisions could be challenged. It would be "disproportionate" to order a rehearing without regard to the new circumstances, including the possibility of resettlement on Diego Garcia.

=== Lord Neuberger ===
Lord Neuberger did not give a separate judgment; he agreed with Lord Mance.

=== Dissent: Lord Kerr ===
==== What the House of Lords had to decide ====
Lord Kerr, with whom Lady Hale agreed, approached the case through the rationality question that had been before the House of Lords. Since the courts had held that the government had no legal obligation to fund resettlement, the report could justify removing the right of abode only as a way of forestalling public pressure to pay for it; that was "a heavy burden for the report to bear". He therefore disagreed with the majority's framing: the question was not whether it was rational to accept the report's conclusions but whether it was rational to deny the islanders their right to live where they were born "for the sole reason of seeking to avoid a potentially embarrassing campaign". The circumstances of the original removal made any later refusal to let them return "all the more difficult to justify".

==== The documents ====
Lord Kerr noted that the conclusion of the earlier preliminary study had also been changed between draft and final versions, from finding "no obvious physical reason" against repopulation to a statement that resettlement was possible "only if a number of conditions are met". On the 6 March 2002 note, he accepted that there was no explicit invitation to change findings, but considered that "the consultants were being given an unmistakable steer as to what FCO wanted the outcome of the report to be", which raised questions about their independence. He acknowledged that Sheppard had supported the consultants on the central climate issue, but noted his warning that "some of its science would be badly savaged by anyone not happy with your conclusions". In light of Sheppard's criticisms and his endorsement of some of Jonathan Jenness's criticisms, made for Bancoult, it was "at least questionable" that the majority would have relied so heavily on the report.

He regarded the change to section 1.8 as the most important. He identified "the transformation of a conditional forecast of frequent flooding etc, predicated on a possible northward shift of the active cyclone belt, into a firm prediction that these and other consequences will occur", together with the dropping of the cyclone belt and a new sentence on storm impacts for which "No evidence was provided". In his view:

It is one thing to say that it is rational to forbid Chagossians to return to their homeland if the dire consequences that were spoken of were going to occur. It is quite another to say that it was reasonable if it was merely possible that they might happen.

==== The test and its application ====
Lord Kerr held that it was enough to show "a real possibility that a different outcome would have occurred", and said that, to the extent that the Court of Appeal decisions in Taylor v Lawrence and Feakins suggested otherwise, "I emphatically disagree with them". Had the documents been before the House of Lords, it would have had to confront five matters: the government's stated hopes for the outcome; officials' power to require amendments; Sheppard's criticisms of much of the report's science; his endorsement of many of Jenness's criticisms; and "most importantly" the rewording of the central climate findings. He concluded that "the collective effect of these revelations is that the appeal might well have been decided differently", and would have granted the application.

==== New evidence, mootness, delay and candour ====
Lord Kerr held that material obtained afterwards to impeach the decision, such as Kench's review, was inadmissible, and rejected the attacks on Sheppard's impartiality as without merit.

He disagreed that the application was academic: if the 2008 decision stood, the starting point for all future consideration would be that section 9 was valid and the removal of the right of abode lawful. Answering Lord Mance and Lord Clarke, he said that whatever the KPMG study found, it could not be relevant to whether the appeal should be reopened, "much less that it is conclusive of that issue", and asked: "What is the juridical basis on which such a conclusion might be made?" The chance of the Chagossians obtaining by that route what a successful appeal would have given them was "remote in the extreme". He found no culpable delay by Bancoult.

On the duty of candour, he described the failure to locate the documents, despite repeated requests and denials of their existence, as "not merely unfortunate, it is plainly reprehensible". He accepted that it was probably an oversight, but "a grievous oversight". He did not accept, however, that the non-disclosure alone justified setting aside the decision.

=== Dissent: Lady Hale ===
Lady Hale opened by calling the case "another chapter in the epic saga of the Chagossians". The legality of the exile had been settled, but those affected were entitled to "the most scrupulous standards of fairness". If a procedure was clearly unfair, the court "should not struggle too hard to discover that the result would have been the same", since parties are entitled to procedural as well as substantive justice.

She said the documents had been asked for many times and their existence denied: "This is scarcely a good advertisement for the quality of government record keeping." In that context, the court "should not take much convincing" that disclosure might have made a difference; it was "quite obvious" that it might have, because the documents cast doubt on the report's authority, showed what the government wanted the conclusions to be, and showed that the islands were not in a cyclone belt. Expressing admiration for Lord Mance's "intellectual honesty" in refusing to set aside a decision he had disagreed with, she would have granted the application for the reasons given by Lord Kerr.

== Aftermath ==
=== The 2016 resettlement decision ===
On 16 November 2016 the government announced that it had "decided against resettlement of the Chagossian people to the British Indian Ocean Territory on the grounds of feasibility, defence and security interests, and cost to the British taxpayer", and would instead fund a package of about £40 million over ten years for Chagossians where they lived. Following Bancoult (No 2) and Bancoult (No 4), it remained prohibited under the 2004 Orders for Chagossians to return to live in the BIOT.

=== Bancoult (No 3) ===
The Supreme Court gave Bancoult permission to appeal in Bancoult (No 3), the MPA case, and dismissed that appeal on 8 February 2018. In that judgment Lord Mance noted that the test applied in Bancoult (No 4) had been discussed "without decision".

=== Hoareau ===
Bancoult and Solange Hoareau then sought judicial review of the 2016 decision. The claimants relied on Lord Mance's and Lord Clarke's statements that the constitutional ban "needs to be revisited", arguing that they created an obligation to reconsider the 2004 Orders. The Divisional Court did not decide whether those statements formed part of the ratio, but held that the judges had been describing the position as counsel had summarised it, and "were not laying down any rule of public law to suggest that there would be some legal obligation to revisit what had been upheld in Bancoult 2". The claims were dismissed in 2019, and the Court of Appeal dismissed the appeal in 2020.

== Reception ==
Writing on the UK Human Rights Blog, Dominic Ruck Keene described Lord Kerr's dissent as "powerful" and called his argument on remedy "categorical (and in my opinion compelling)". He described the history of the Chagossians' removal as an "extremely unedifying tale".

== See also ==
- Detachment of the Chagos Archipelago
- Chagos Archipelago
- Louis Olivier Bancoult
- Expulsion of the Chagossians
- Chagos Archipelago sovereignty dispute
- Chagos Islanders v United Kingdom

== Sources ==
=== Court decisions ===
- R (Bancoult) v Secretary of State for Foreign and Commonwealth Affairs, EWHC (Admin) 1038 (High Court (Divisional Court) 11 May 2006).
- R (Bancoult) v Secretary of State for Foreign and Commonwealth Affairs (No 2), UKHL 61 (House of Lords 22 October 2008).
- R (Bancoult No 2) v Secretary of State for Foreign and Commonwealth Affairs, UKSC 35 (Supreme Court 29 June 2016).
- R (Bancoult No 3) v Secretary of State for Foreign and Commonwealth Affairs, UKSC 3 (Supreme Court 8 February 2018).
- R (Hoareau and Bancoult) v Secretary of State for Foreign and Commonwealth Affairs, EWHC (Admin) 221 (High Court (Divisional Court) 8 February 2019).
- R (Hoareau and Bancoult) v Secretary of State for Foreign and Commonwealth Affairs, EWCA Civ 1010 (Court of Appeal 30 July 2020).

=== Other sources ===
- Duncan, Alan (16 November 2016). "Update on the British Indian Ocean Territory (HCWS260)". UK Parliament: Written questions, answers and statements. Statement made on behalf of Baroness Anelay, Minister of State.
- Ruck Keene, Dominic (6 July 2016). "Another door closes for the Chagossians". UK Human Rights Blog.
- "R (on the application of Bancoult (No 2)) (Appellant) v Secretary of State for Foreign and Commonwealth Affairs (Respondent)". The Supreme Court. Case ID UKSC/2015/0021.
