= Richard Waller =

Richard Waller may refer to:

- Richard Waller (naturalist) (died 1715), English naturalist, translator and illustrator
- Sir Richard Waller (knight), English soldier and official
- Richard Waller (musician), American clarinetist and visual artist
- Rik Waller (Richard Waller), English pop singer
