= R (Bancoult) v Secretary of State for Foreign and Commonwealth Affairs (No 3) =

UK judicial review of the Chagos Marine Protected Area, 2013–2018

- Court: Supreme Court of the United Kingdom
- Full case name: R (on the application of Bancoult No 3) v Secretary of State for Foreign and Commonwealth Affairs
- Decided: 8 February 2018
- Citation: [2018] UKSC 3; [2018] 1 WLR 973; [2018] 2 All ER 945; [2018] Env LR 24
- Transcript: BAILII

Case history
- Prior actions: [2013] EWHC 1502 (Admin) (Divisional Court: Richards LJ and Mitting J, claim dismissed, 11 June 2013); [2014] EWCA Civ 708, [2014] 1 WLR 2921 (Court of Appeal: the Master of the Rolls, Gloster LJ and Vos LJ, appeal dismissed, 23 May 2014)
- Appealed from: Court of Appeal (England and Wales)
- Subsequent action: Cited in the ICJ advisory opinion of 25 February 2019
- Related actions: Mauritius v United Kingdom (UNCLOS Annex VII arbitration, award of 18 March 2015); Bancoult (No 4) [2016] UKSC 35

Court membership
- Judges sitting: Lord Neuberger, Lady Hale, Lord Mance, Lord Kerr, Lord Clarke, Lord Sumption, Lord Reed

Case opinions
- Appeal dismissed 5–2 on improper motive and on the omission of Mauritian fishing rights from the consultation. The Secretary of State's cross-appeal on the admissibility of the leaked cable was dismissed: the cable was admissible in evidence.
- Decision by: Lord Mance (joined by Lord Neuberger, Lord Clarke and Lord Reed)
- Concurrence: Lord Sumption, on the cross-appeal (joined by Lord Neuberger, Lord Clarke and Lord Reed)
- Dissent: Lord Kerr; Lady Hale

Keywords
- Judicial review; Improper purpose; Consultation; Vienna Convention on Diplomatic Relations; Leaked diplomatic cables; Chagos Marine Protected Area

R (Bancoult) v Secretary of State for Foreign and Commonwealth Affairs (No 3), also known as Bancoult (No 3), was a judicial review in the courts of England and Wales of the decision of the Foreign Secretary, David Miliband, to create a "no-take" marine protected area (MPA) around the Chagos Islands in the British Indian Ocean Territory (BIOT) on 1 April 2010. The claimant, Olivier Bancoult, is the chair of the Chagos Refugees Group. His central allegation was that the MPA had been created for the improper purpose of preventing the Chagossians from resettling the islands. He relied on a leaked United States embassy cable of 15 May 2009, published after it was passed on by WikiLeaks, which recorded the BIOT Commissioner, Colin Roberts, as saying that a marine park would "put paid to resettlement claims". He also argued that the public consultation had been unfair, in particular because it did not mention arguable Mauritian fishing rights, and that the MPA breached EU law.

A Divisional Court of Richards LJ and Mitting J dismissed the claim on 11 June 2013. It held the cable inadmissible under the Vienna Convention on Diplomatic Relations, and found "simply no ground to suspect" that the Foreign Secretary had acted for an improper purpose. The Court of Appeal held on 23 May 2014 that the cable was admissible, but dismissed the appeal because admitting it would have made no difference.

On 8 February 2018 the Supreme Court dismissed Bancoult's appeal by five votes to two. It also dismissed the government's cross-appeal, holding that the cable was admissible in evidence. Lord Kerr and Lady Hale dissented, holding that the cable could have made a difference to the result. In a separate case brought by Mauritius, an arbitral tribunal under the United Nations Convention on the Law of the Sea had found in 2015 that the United Kingdom breached the convention in creating the MPA.

== Background ==
=== Earlier litigation ===
After Bancoult won the quashing of the 1971 immigration ordinance that excluded the islanders (Bancoult (No 1), 2000), the government made the British Indian Ocean Territory (Constitution) Order 2004, which provided that no person had the right of abode in the territory. The House of Lords upheld that order in October 2008 (Bancoult (No 2)). An application by Bancoult and other Chagossians to the European Court of Human Rights was declared inadmissible in December 2012 (Chagos Islanders v United Kingdom).

=== The Marine Protected Area ===
The idea of a no-take MPA came from an American environmental group, the Pew Environmental Group, which proposed it to the BIOT's environmental adviser, Professor Charles Sheppard, in July 2007. On 5 May 2009 Roberts, then the Foreign Office's Director for Overseas Territories and Commissioner for the BIOT, sent the Foreign Secretary a briefing note on the proposal. The note listed the benefits of an MPA and identified three risks: the Mauritian claim to sovereignty, "the Chagossian movements", and the United States military. On the Chagossians it said that their plans for resettlement were based on fishing and tourism, which "would be incompatible with a marine reserve", and continued:

Assuming we win in Strasbourg (contingency for losing the cases dealt with in earlier submissions), we should be aiming to calm down the resettlement debate. Creating a reserve will not achieve this, but it could create a context for a raft of measures designed to weaken the movement.

— Colin Roberts, briefing note of 5 May 2009, quoted by the Divisional Court

The Foreign Secretary's private secretary replied on 7 May that he "was really fired up about this after the meeting". A public consultation ran from 10 November 2009 to 5 March 2010. The consultation document stated that, after Bancoult (No 2), there was no right of abode in the territory and that an MPA "would have no direct immediate impact on the Chagossian community".

On 30 March 2010 officials advised the Foreign Secretary to publish the consultation report but to declare an MPA only after further work. He rejected that advice on 31 March and instructed Roberts to declare the full no-take MPA the next day. The MPA was established on 1 April 2010 by Proclamation No 1 of 2010, issued by Roberts as Commissioner. In announcing it the Foreign Secretary said that it would "cover some quarter of a million square miles". (Note: The Divisional Court's judgment gives the area as "250,000 m2" in its first paragraph; the Court of Appeal gives "some 250,000 square miles", which matches the Foreign Secretary's statement.) In practice the no-take zone was achieved by letting existing fishing licences expire and issuing no new ones; the last licence expired in October 2010.

=== The cable ===
On 12 May 2009 Roberts and Joanne Yeadon, the BIOT Administrator, met United States officials at the Foreign Office to discuss the proposal. A document purporting to be a cable sent on 15 May 2009 by the US Embassy in London to Washington, to military commands and to the embassy in Port Louis was published by The Guardian on 2 December 2010 and by The Telegraph on 4 February 2011. It had been passed to the newspapers by WikiLeaks, and purported to be a record by a US political counsellor, Richard Mills. The Divisional Court noted that, if genuine, it was "the only near-contemporaneous record of the meeting known to exist". The passages relied on read:

Roberts stated that according to the HGM's [sic] current thinking on a reserve, there would be no 'human footprints' or 'Man Fridays' on the BIOT's uninhabited islands. He asserted that establishing a marine park would, in effect, put paid to resettlement claims of the archipelago's former residents ... Establishing a marine reserve might indeed, as FCO's Roberts stated, be the most effective long-term way to prevent any of the Chagos islands' former inhabitants or their descendants from resettling in the BIOT.

— US embassy cable of 15 May 2009, paras 7 and 15, as quoted by the Court of Appeal

Lord Mance later noted that the opening paragraph and the final two paragraphs of the cable were comment or summary by its author, while the intermediate paragraphs purported to record the discussion.

== The claim ==
Bancoult brought the claim on his own behalf and for the benefit of others; he said that he supported environmental protection of the islands but objected to the no-take character of the MPA. His re-amended grounds alleged that the decision was flawed by:

1. an improper motive, namely an intention to prevent Chagossians and their descendants from resettling in the BIOT;
2. the failure to reveal in the consultation that the government's own consultants had advised that resettlement was feasible;
3. the failure to disclose relevant environmental information during the consultation;
4. the failure to disclose that a ban on all fishing would affect traditional fishing rights of Chagossians, both as Mauritian citizens and as the native population; and
5. breach of the United Kingdom's obligations under Article 198 of the Treaty on the Functioning of the European Union, which concerns the association of overseas territories with the European Union.

On 25 July 2012 Stanley Burnton LJ ordered Roberts and Yeadon to attend for cross-examination on the cable, holding that the claim could not fairly be decided without resolving what had happened at the meeting of 12 May 2009.

== Divisional Court (2013) ==
On improper motive, the Divisional Court reviewed the documents and the oral evidence of Roberts and Yeadon, and held that the decision was "the personal decision of the Foreign Secretary", taken against the advice of his officials. It explained his decision to act at once by "the political context: Parliament was about to be dissolved". It concluded: "There is simply no ground to suspect, let alone to believe or to find proved, that the Foreign Secretary was motivated by the improper purpose for which the claimant contends." It added that the MPA could not have achieved such a purpose: "What prevents the return of Chagossians to the islands is the 2004 Order, not the MPA." The claimant's theory, which required a secret plot unknown to both the Administrator and the Foreign Secretary, "would provide an unconvincing plot for a novel". The aim in Roberts's note to "calm down the resettlement debate" was the only collateral factor in the minds of the advisers, and the claimant's counsel accepted that it would not taint a decision genuinely taken for environmental and scientific purposes.

The court rejected the two consultation grounds about resettlement, holding that the feasibility studies were irrelevant: "The consultation was clearly about conservation, not about resettlement." On fishing rights, it held that any traditional fishing rights of the inhabitants "were lost with the loss of the right of abode and their removal from the islands". It declined to decide whether Mauritius had fishing rights under international law, saying that the UNCLOS arbitration brought by Mauritius was the appropriate forum. Few Mauritian vessels had been affected, and Mauritius had always put its case in terms of sovereignty. The omission of the point from the consultation document was therefore "a matter of no significance".

On EU law, the court held that Bancoult could rely on Article 4(3) of the Treaty on European Union, but that the MPA, which only prohibited fishing, had no appreciable adverse effect on the development of the islands, although it had hurt the incomes of a few Chagossian fishermen. It reached the same conclusion as the European Commission, which had closed Bancoult's complaint in January 2013. The claim was dismissed.

== Court of Appeal (2014) ==
Bancoult appealed on three grounds: improper motive, fishing rights and EU law. The Court of Appeal (the Master of the Rolls, Gloster LJ and Vos LJ) gave a judgment to which each member contributed. It held that the cable should have been admitted (see below), but that the exclusion had not affected the result. The cross-examination of Roberts and Yeadon on the cable's contents had been "extensive and searching", and there was no realistic possibility that the Divisional Court's assessment of their evidence would have been different. In any case the Divisional Court had found that the Foreign Secretary made the decision personally and had no improper motive, a finding that was not under appeal; counsel had not suggested to either witness that the Foreign Secretary shared the alleged purpose.

The court rejected the fishing rights ground largely for the reasons given by the Divisional Court. Since 1973 Chagossians had not exercised fishing rights as islanders, and working as crew on licensed Mauritian vessels was not the exercise of "traditional fishing rights".

On EU law, the court held that the Divisional Court was entitled to find no breach; the allegations were "an artificial construct", because the treaty articles look at "the big picture", not at the incomes of individual Chagossians. In passages that it said were not decisive, it doubted that Articles 198 and 199 TFEU, which it called "statements of aspiration", could have direct effect, and said that, had the point been decisive, it would have referred it to the Court of Justice. It also held that the Divisional Court had been wrong to treat itself as unconstrained by the Commission's view. The appeal was dismissed and permission to appeal to the Supreme Court refused.

== Supreme Court (2018) ==
The Supreme Court gave permission to appeal on improper purpose on 7 July 2016, and listed the application for permission on fishing rights to be heard with the appeal. The Secretary of State challenged the Court of Appeal's ruling that the cable was admissible. Seven justices heard the case on 28 and 29 June 2017: Lord Neuberger, Lady Hale, Lord Mance, Lord Kerr, Lord Clarke, Lord Sumption and Lord Reed. Nigel Pleming QC led for Bancoult and Steven Kovats QC for the Secretary of State.

Lord Mance gave the leading judgment, with which Lord Neuberger, Lord Clarke and Lord Reed agreed. Lord Sumption, with whom the same three justices agreed, added a judgment on the cross-appeal about the cable; he also agreed with Lord Mance's disposal and reasons. Lord Kerr dissented on improper motive but agreed with Lord Mance on fishing rights; Lady Hale dissented.

=== Improper motive ===
Lord Mance stressed that the idea of a no-take MPA "was generated by independent environmental activity", and that the decision-maker was always to be Miliband in person. First, he asked whether further cross-examination, or the cable itself, could have led the Divisional Court to find an improper motive on the part of Roberts or Yeadon. He held that it could not: their evidence was "generally and substantially consistent" with the cable, and the cable "is at the very lowest ambiguous" as to whether the references to resettlement were part of the motive for the MPA rather than an account of its practical consequences, which is what would have concerned the Americans.

Second, even if the officials had held and voiced an improper motive, there was no basis for thinking that it affected Miliband or his decision. The suggestion that he was motivated by a desire to make return difficult "finds no basis in the documentation or exchanges and has to my mind no plausibility at all". Lord Mance rejected the argument that, under the Carltona principle, the minister could be fixed with the motives of his officials: because he took the decision himself, "it is his state of mind that is critical, not that of his civil servants".

=== Fishing rights ===
Lord Mance granted permission to appeal on fishing rights but dismissed the appeal on that ground too. He noted that the UNCLOS tribunal had since held binding the United Kingdom's undertaking on Mauritian fishing rights in the territorial sea, and that the government had told the court it was committed to implementing the award. The case before the court, however, was only that the consultation should have mentioned credible evidence of arguable Mauritian fishing rights. Mauritius did not respond to the consultation at all, though it could have done, and other respondents raised fishing rights; the omission did not "undermine the consultation, make it unfair or justify setting it or any decision consequent upon it aside". Lord Mance said that the effect of the tribunal's finding in domestic law was not before the court.

== Admissibility of the cable ==
=== Divisional Court ===
The Divisional Court assumed, without deciding, that the document was genuine. It held that the government's policy to neither confirm nor deny the authenticity of leaked documents would not by itself have excluded the cable, since refusing to admit it could allow the government "to conceal an improper and unlawful motive". Nor would its use be an offence under the Official Secrets Act 1989, given its extensive prior publication.

During the hearing, however, the government raised a further objection: that the cable was protected by Articles 24 and 27(2) of the Vienna Convention, which make the archives, documents and official correspondence of a diplomatic mission "inviolable". The court ruled on it on the third day. The court held itself bound by Shearson Lehman Brothers v Maclaine Watson (1988), in which Lord Bridge said that it would be "wholly inimical" to the purpose of inviolability for the courts to let a person who received a document from the violator use it in judicial proceedings. It treated electronic cables as documents and correspondence, and held that the cable remained inviolable after it had been sent to Washington. It found it a "settled principle of public international and municipal law" that courts must exclude illicitly obtained diplomatic documents without the sending state's consent, and ruled the cable inadmissible. After the ruling Pleming did not cross-examine Roberts further, and cross-examined Yeadon within its limits.

=== Court of Appeal ===
The Court of Appeal held that Lord Bridge's statement in Shearson Lehman was not binding, since it was not part of the reasoning necessary to the decision. It preferred the view of F. A. Mann that inviolability meant only freedom from interference by the receiving state. The cable had been sent to Washington with the consent of the United States and published by a third party, and Bancoult was not involved in its removal or publication. The court said that "it makes no sense for the concept of inviolability of the mission to be extended to prevent a document that is in the worldwide public domain from being admitted in proceedings in England and Wales". It allowed the appeal on that "narrow basis", since the cable "had already been disclosed to the world by a third party".

=== Supreme Court ===
All seven justices agreed that the cable was admissible, but on different reasoning from the Court of Appeal. Lord Mance held that inviolability under Articles 24 and 27(2) does in principle prevent the use of mission documents in the courts of the host state, but subject to two qualifications: the document must remain part of the mission's archive, and its contents must not have been so widely published as to destroy any confidentiality. Once the cable reached the State Department or another addressee, it was no longer shown to be part of the London embassy's archive, and "On that simple basis, the Wikileaks cable was available for use and admissible as evidence of its contents in the present proceedings." He also held that the cable had "lost its inviolability" by being put into the public domain, in circumstances for which Bancoult was not responsible.

Lord Sumption wrote separately because "The leaking of governmental documents and their widespread distribution through the internet is a phenomenon of our time." He held that the test of whether a document belongs to a mission's archive is whether it is under the control of the mission's personnel. Rejecting the Court of Appeal's narrower view, he held that a court which receives such a document obtained without authority does in principle violate it. But once documents have been published to the world, their confidentiality "has already been destroyed". The cross-appeal failed for two reasons: the government could not show that the cable came from the London embassy's archives, and in any case Bancoult had only made use in litigation "of the common knowledge of mankind simply because it was once confidential to the US embassy in London". Lord Kerr agreed with both Lord Mance and Lord Sumption on admissibility. Lady Hale held that any control over this cable had been lost even before WikiLeaks published it.

== Roberts's evidence ==
The courts described Roberts's evidence about the meeting of 12 May 2009 in different terms. The Divisional Court recorded that he accepted that it was government policy that there should be no human footprint on the islands other than Diego Garcia, and that he had probably said so; he "adamantly denied" the words "Man Fridays", which he called a quotation from a 1960s colonial official that was offensive to Chagossians. It recorded that "He accepted that he recognised that the declaration of an MPA, if 'entrenched' ... would create a serious obstacle to resettlement", and that he had told the Americans that the proposal was without prejudice to the Strasbourg case. Yeadon was "adamant" that Roberts had not said that the former inhabitants would find it difficult to pursue resettlement if the archipelago were a reserve, and the court found her "an impressive and truthful witness".

The Court of Appeal, reviewing the transcript, went further. It recorded that "Mr Roberts accepted that he did say to the US officials that the establishment of an MPA would in effect put paid to the resettlement claims", describing this as "a recognition of a reality" if the MPA were entrenched in law. It noted that Mitting J had questioned during the hearing whether further debate was needed, since Roberts had accepted that a consequence of the MPA would be that the Chagossians' hopes to return would be thwarted. Yeadon, by contrast, told the court: "I'm telling the court he did not say that. It wouldn't have made any sense." The Court of Appeal held that the Divisional Court had been "alive to the fact" that Roberts recognised that an entrenched MPA would be a serious obstacle to resettlement.

In the Supreme Court, Lord Mance accepted that the Divisional Court "did not directly address the contradiction between their evidence on the question whether Mr Roberts had said that an MPA would put paid to resettlement". He held that it must have accepted Roberts's explanation that he was describing the practical consequences of an MPA, not its motive. Lord Kerr saw the same discrepancy as crucial: Yeadon's denial was "directly contrary to the evidence of Mr Roberts himself". He contrasted the 5 May note to the minister with what the cable recorded Roberts telling the Americans a week later.

== Dissents ==
Lord Kerr began: "The only legitimate purpose for introducing a marine protected area (MPA) around the Chagos Islands was to protect marine life." He held that, "Viewed in isolation, the cable certainly creates a suspicion that this was a motivating factor in the decision to declare an MPA." Excluding the cable had two effects: it prevented counsel from confronting the witnesses with an admissible record that contradicted them, and it meant the Divisional Court never weighed the cable as independent evidence against their testimony.

Lord Kerr held that the correct test was whether a different outcome was possible, not whether it would have happened. He also rejected the majority's view that the minister's personal decision protected it: if officials had concealed their true motive in advising him, "his decision is impeachable because he was deprived of the opportunity to consider all relevant circumstances". Of Lord Mance's answer to this point, he wrote: "With much regret, I must register my profound disagreement with this statement." He would have allowed the appeal and sent the case back to a Divisional Court to be reconsidered with the cable admitted, since there was "a substantial possibility" of a different view of the evidence.

Lady Hale called the case "of huge importance to the Chagossians in their campaign to be permitted to re-settle in their islands and to fish in the waters surrounding them". She agreed with Lord Kerr that "we cannot be confident that the findings of the Divisional Court would have been the same had the 'Wikileaks cable' been admitted into evidence". She would have allowed the appeal.

== Significance and aftermath ==
On 20 December 2010 Mauritius began arbitration proceedings against the United Kingdom under Annex VII of UNCLOS, challenging the creation of the MPA (Mauritius v United Kingdom). In its award of 18 March 2015 the tribunal declared that, in establishing the MPA, the United Kingdom had breached its obligations under Articles 2(3), 56(2) and 194(4) of the convention. The tribunal reviewed the record of the English proceedings, saw "no basis to question the conclusion reached" that the meeting had not been as recorded in the cable, and declined "to place weight on a record of such provenance". It found nothing in the internal British correspondence that suggested "an ulterior motive or improper purpose".

The MPA also featured in Bancoult's application to set aside the House of Lords' decision in Bancoult (No 2), which the Supreme Court dismissed in 2016 (Bancoult (No 4)). Lord Mance, giving the leading judgment, relied on the government's statement that the MPA did not preclude resettlement, adding that any limit it did place on resettlement could only be removed by a successful challenge in Bancoult (No 3).

In its advisory opinion of 25 February 2019 on the separation of the Chagos Archipelago, the International Court of Justice summarised the case among the facts concerning the Chagossians. It recorded that the Supreme Court "held that the cable in question was admissible. However, it dismissed the appeal on other grounds."

== See also ==
- Detachment of the Chagos Archipelago
- Chagos Marine Protected Area
- Expulsion of the Chagossians
- Chagos Archipelago sovereignty dispute
- Vienna Convention on Diplomatic Relations

== Sources ==
=== Court decisions ===
- R (Bancoult) v Secretary of State for Foreign and Commonwealth Affairs, EWHC (Admin) 1502 (High Court (Divisional Court) 11 June 2013).
- R (Bancoult) v Secretary of State for Foreign and Commonwealth Affairs, EWCA Civ 708 (Court of Appeal 23 May 2014).
- R (Bancoult No 2) v Secretary of State for Foreign and Commonwealth Affairs, UKSC 35 (Supreme Court 29 June 2016).
- R (Bancoult No 3) v Secretary of State for Foreign and Commonwealth Affairs, UKSC 3 (Supreme Court 8 February 2018).

=== Other sources ===
- Legal Consequences of the Separation of the Chagos Archipelago from Mauritius in 1965, Advisory Opinion (PDF). I.C.J. Reports 2019. International Court of Justice. 25 February 2019. p. 95.
- In the Matter of the Chagos Marine Protected Area Arbitration (Mauritius v. United Kingdom): Award (PDF). Permanent Court of Arbitration. 18 March 2015.
