= Re Citro =

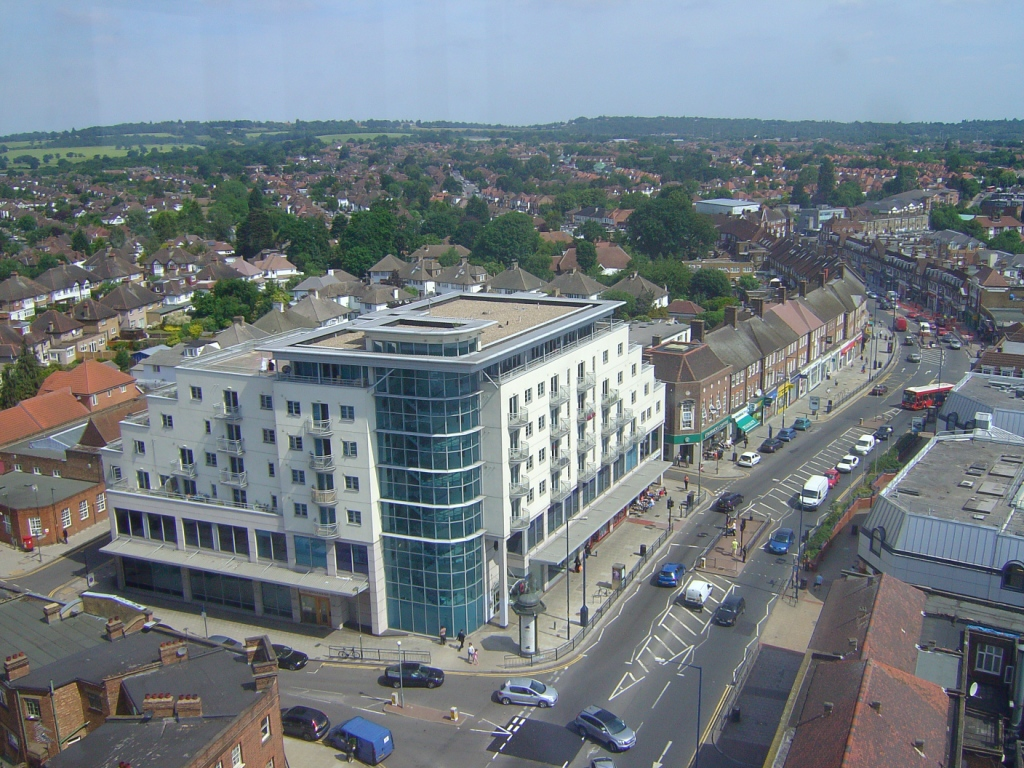
- Central Edgware: the heavily-indebted bankrupts had a 50% and 100% share in two attractive privately built houses in outer north-west London.
- Court: Court of Appeal
- Citation: [1991] Ch 142

Case history
- Prior actions: Appellant largely lost at first instance, having to wait until the youngest children reached 16 before any sales.
- Subsequent action: none

Case opinions
- Decision by: Nourse LJ; Bingham LJ
- Dissent: Waller LJ

Keywords
- Co-ownership, bankruptcy, expensive homes, homes in family occupation of the bankrupt, bankrupt co-owners, non-bankrupt co-owner, multiple families, children's educational needs

Re Citro [1991] Ch 142 is an English land law and bankruptcy law case, concerning co-ownership of land, and an order for possession on bankruptcy of one co-owner.

== Facts ==
Domenico and Carmine Citro went bankrupt and he had a solvent ex-wife. The remaining assets were a half share in their two family homes — Domenico had separated from his ex-wife and had his own house, co-owned with his new wife with three children, youngest 12 years old in Dryfield Road, Burnt Oak, Edgware of mid-to-high price in outer north-west London, being typical of private housing in London Borough of Barnet. Carmine continued to live with three children, youngest 10 at Bell Lane, Hendon, a similar value house in the same Borough. The debts owed exceeded the value of the bankrupts' interests (equity) in the homes. The trustees in bankruptcy applied for declarations and for orders for sale under the Law of Property Act 1925, section 30 (now replaced by the Trusts of Land and Appointment of Trustees Act 1996, section 14).

== Judgment ==
=== High Court ===
Hoffmann J made orders for possession and sale but considering the circumstances of the two (successive) wives and their children, and because a half share left for the wives would not be enough to buy accommodation in his view reasonably nearby, and his assessment of finding equally good education in the area, he ordered the sales be postponed until each of the youngest children became 16.

=== Court of Appeal ===
Nourse LJ allowed the lenders’ appeal, whose interests would usually prevail. Financial hardship is not an exceptional circumstance. ‘Exceptional’ means beyond the normal ‘melancholy consequences’ of bankruptcy so hardship, eviction, relocation do not qualify as exceptional circumstances. The circumstances must be special, not just unusual.

Bingham LJ concurred, regretfully, because he said prior cases pointed this way and it was important to avoid arbitrariness. Still, he said submissions on a moratorium were to be invited.

Waller LJ dissented.

== See also ==
- Bankruptcy in the United Kingdom
- English land law
- English property law
