= Waller baronets of Newport (1780) =

Escutcheon of the Waller baronets of Newport

The Waller baronetcy, of Newport in the County of Tipperary, was created in the Baronetage of Ireland on 1 June 1780 for Robert Waller, Member of the Irish Parliament for Dundalk and a Commissioner of Revenue. The 2nd Baronet served as High Sheriff of King's County in 1826.

== Waller baronets, of Newport (1780) ==
- Sir Robert Waller, 1st Baronet (1738–1780)
- Sir Robert Waller, 2nd Baronet (1768–1826)
- Sir Charles Townshend Waller, 3rd Baronet (1772–1830)
- Sir Edmund Waller, 4th Baronet (1797–1851)
- Sir Edmund Arthur Waller, 5th Baronet (1846–1888)
- Sir Charles Waller, 6th Baronet (1835–1912)
- Sir William Edgar Waller, 7th Baronet (1863–1943)
- Sir Roland Edgar Waller, 8th Baronet (1892–1958)
- Sir Robert William Waller, 9th Baronet (1934–2000)
- Sir John Michael Waller, 10th Baronet (born 1962), resident in the USA.

The heir apparent is the present holder's son John Michael Waller (born 1990).
