= Woodrow Wilson Supreme Court candidates =

Woodrow Wilson appointed three Associate Justices to the Supreme Court of the United States, James Clark McReynolds, Louis Brandeis, and John Hessin Clarke.

== James Clark McReynolds nomination ==
Following the sudden death of Horace Harmon Lurton in 1914, Wilson nominated his Attorney General, James Clark McReynolds. Some accounts "attribute Wilson's choice of McReynolds to inattention, or his desire to kick a politically troublesome attorney-general upstairs". Nominated on August 19, 1914, the Senate confirmed him ten days later on a 44–6 vote. When nominating McReynolds, Wilson erroneously believed him to be a liberal, but during his tenure as a justice, McReynolds became "best remembered as a stalwart conservative and a foe of economic regulatory power by government." Over his 26 years on the Court, McReynolds strongly opposed the New Deal and was a reactionary, known for his open racism and antisemitism.

== Louis Brandeis nomination ==
Following the death of Joseph Rucker Lamar in 1916, Wilson surprised the nation by nominating Louis Brandeis to become a member of the U.S. Supreme Court. Wilson "evidently did not consider anyone else". The nomination was bitterly contested and denounced by conservative Republicans, including former president William Howard Taft, whose credibility was damaged by Brandeis in early court battles, where he called Taft a "muckraker". Further opposition came from members of the legal profession, including former Attorney General George W. Wickersham and former presidents of the American Bar Association, such as ex-Senator and Secretary of State Elihu Root of New York, who claimed Brandeis was "unfit" to serve on the Supreme Court.

The controversy surrounding Brandeis's nomination was so great that the Senate Judiciary Committee, for the first time in its history, held a public hearing on the nomination, allowing witnesses to appear before the committee and offer testimony both in support of and in opposition to Brandeis's confirmation. While previous nominees to the Supreme Court had been confirmed or rejected by a simple up-or-down vote on the Senate floor—often on the same day on which the President had sent the nomination to the Senate—a then-unprecedented four months lapsed between Wilson's nomination of Brandeis and the Senate's final confirmation vote.

What Brandeis's opponents most objected to was his "radicalism." The Wall Street Journal wrote of Brandeis, "In all the anti-corporation agitation of the past, one name stands out ... where others were radical, he was rabid." The New York Times claimed that having been a noted "reformer" for so many years, he would lack the "dispassionate temperament that is required of a judge." Brandeis's successor on the Court, Justice William O. Douglas, wrote many years later that the nomination of Brandeis "frightened the Establishment" because he was "a militant crusader for social justice."

According to legal historian Scott Powe, much of the opposition to Brandeis' appointment also stemmed from "blatant anti-semitism." Taft would accuse Brandeis of using his Judaism to curry political favor, and Wickersham would refer to Brandeis' supporters (and Taft's critics) as "a bunch of Hebrew uplifters." Senator Henry Cabot Lodge privately complained that "If it were not that Brandeis is a Jew, and a German Jew, he would never have been appointed[.]"

Those in favor of seeing him join the court were just as numerous and influential. Supporters included attorneys, social workers, and reformers with whom he had worked on cases, and they testified eagerly in his behalf. Harvard law professor Roscoe Pound told the committee that "Brandeis was one of the great lawyers," and predicted that he would one day rank "with the best who have sat upon the bench of the Supreme Court." Other lawyers who supported him pointed out to the committee that he "had angered some of his clients by his conscientious striving to be fair to both sides in a case."

In May, when the Senate Judiciary Committee asked the Attorney General to provide the letters of endorsement that traditionally accompanied a Supreme Court nomination, Attorney General Gregory found there were none. President Wilson had made the nomination on the basis of personal knowledge. In reply to the Committee, President Wilson wrote a letter to the Chairman, Senator Charles Culberson, testifying to his own personal estimation of the nominee's character and abilities. He called his nominee's advice "singularly enlightening, singularly clear-sighted and judicial, and, above all, full of moral stimulation." He added:

I cannot speak too highly of his impartial, impersonal, orderly, and constructive mind, his rare analytical powers, his deep human sympathy, his profound acquaintance with the historical roots of our institutions and insight into their spirit, or of the many evidences he has given of being imbued, to the very heart, with our American ideals of justice and equality of opportunity; of his knowledge of modern economic conditions and of the way they bear upon the masses of the people, or of his genius in getting persons to unite in common and harmonious action and look with frank and kindly eyes into each other's minds, who had before been heated antagonists.

A month later, on June 1, 1916, the Senate officially confirmed his nomination by a vote of 47 to 22. Forty-four Democratic Senators and three Republicans (Robert La Follette, George Norris, and Miles Poindexter) voted in favor of confirming Brandeis. Twenty-one Republican Senators and one Democrat (Francis G. Newlands) voted against his confirmation.

Once on the Court, Brandeis kept active politically but worked behind the scenes, as was acceptable at the time. He was an advisor to Franklin Roosevelt's New Deal through intermediaries. Many of his disciples held influential jobs, especially in the Justice Department. Brandeis and Felix Frankfurter often collaborated on political issues.

== John Hessin Clarke ==
In June 1916, a vacancy arose on the Supreme Court when Associate Justice Charles Evans Hughes resigned to accept the Republican nomination for President. Wilson wanted to fill the seat by appointing his Attorney General, Thomas W. Gregory, but Gregory demurred and suggested John Hessin Clarke instead. Wilson had previously appointed Clarke to a seat on the United States District Court for the Northern District of Ohio.

After having Newton Baker (Wilson's Secretary of War and a close friend of Clarke's) speak with Clarke to confirm his opposition to trusts, Wilson offered Clarke the nomination. Though Clarke was reluctant to abandon trial for appellate work, he felt he could not pass on such an honor and accepted. Wilson sent his name to the Senate on July 14, 1916 and Clarke was confirmed by the United States Senate unanimously ten days later.

== Names mentioned ==
Following is a list of individuals who were mentioned in various news accounts and books as having been considered by Wilson for a Supreme Court appointment:–

=== United States district court judges ===
- John Hessin Clarke (1857–1945) – United States District Court for the Northern District of Ohio (nominated and confirmed)

=== State supreme courts ===
- Waller Washington Graves (1860–1928) – Judge of the Supreme Court of Missouri
- William Reynolds Allen (1860–1921) – Justice of the North Carolina Supreme Court

=== United States senators ===
- John K. Shields (1858–1934) – United States Senator from Tennessee

=== Executive branch ===
- William Howard Taft (1857–1930) – former President of the United States (later nominated as Chief Justice by President Warren G. Harding and confirmed)
- James Clark McReynolds (1862–1946) – United States Attorney General (nominated and confirmed)
- Frederick William Lehmann (1853–1931) – United States Solicitor General
- John W. Davis (1873–1955) – United States Solicitor General; 1924 Democratic Presidential candidate
- Franklin Knight Lane (1864–1921) – Secretary of the Interior
- Lindley Miller Garrison (1864–1932) – Secretary of War

=== Other backgrounds ===
- Louis Dembitz Brandeis (1856–1941) — economic adviser and private attorney (nominated and confirmed)

== See also ==
- List of federal judges appointed by Woodrow Wilson
