= William Reynolds Allen =

American judge (1860–1921)

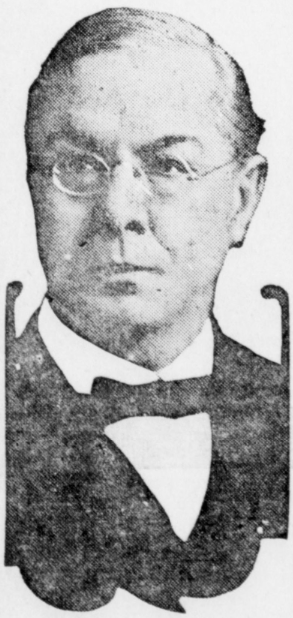
Allen

William Reynolds Allen (March 26, 1860 – September 8, 1921) was a justice of the North Carolina Supreme Court from 1911 until his death in 1921.

== Early life, education, and career ==
Born at Kenansville, North Carolina, to William A. and Maria Goodwin (Hicks) Allen, he was educated at R. W. Millard's and Samuel Clement's village schools in Kenansville, and attended Trinity College from 1876 to 1877. He read law under the supervision of his father to gain admission to the bar in North Carolina in the January term of 1891. He began the practice of law at Kenansville. In the fall of 1881, he moved to Goldsboro where he enjoyed a large and growing practice in Wayne, Duplin, Sampson and adjoining counties.

He served from 1890 to 1882 as chairman of the Board of Education of Wayne County, North Carolina, and represented Wayne County in the North Carolina House of Representatives in the General Assembly of 1893, serving in that body as chairman of the Judiciary Committee.

== Judicial service ==
In 1894, Governor Elias Carr appointed Allen to a seat on the North Carolina Fourth Judicial District, vacated by the resignation of Judge Spier Whitaker. Allen was afterwards unanimously nominated by acclimation at the Democratic Convention of the district in July of that year. At that time, he was the youngest man on the bench and one of the youngest ever elevated to that office. He held his first court at Marion, North Carolina, on August 20, 1894. Allen served on the court until 1895, and was again elected to the state legislatures of 1899 and 1901. He was returned to the superior court bench from 1903 to 1911.

Allen was elected as an associate justice of the Supreme Court of North Carolina in 1910, and remained in that office until his death. Following the death of United States Supreme Court Justice Joseph Rucker Lamar in 1916, Allen was reported to be among the Woodrow Wilson Supreme Court candidates to fill the spot.

== Personal life and death ==
On November 3, 1886, Allen married Mattie M. Moore, with whom he had five children.

Allen died suddenly from a stroke at his home in Goldsboro, North Carolina, at the age of 61.

Political offices
Preceded by James S. Manning	Justice of the North Carolina Supreme Court; 1911–1921	Succeeded by William J. Adams
