= Charles Townshend Waller =

Charles Townshend Waller (c. 1780 – 1830), Reverend and Knight, 3rd Baronet was a member of the baronetage of Ireland in the late eighteenth century.

== Biography ==
He was born in Lisbrien, County Tipperary around 1780 to Robert William Waller (1738–1780) and Catherine Moore (born 1746). His chief residence was Writhlington House, near Bath, England. Waller inherited the baronetcy in 1826 on the death of his brother. He was already rector of Sedgehill in Wiltshire.

Waller was closely involved with the Irish Land question, and was concerned for treating farmers – little more than peasants at the time – fairly, and establishing means by which they could purchase their own land instead of holding it in fee simple as they did. In 1827 he composed a pamphlet for the duke of Wellington on the matter, entitled 'A Plan for the Relief of the Poor in Ireland.' Here he suggested the creation of joint-stock companies that would invest in the farmers' land and rent them living places at low rents.

He died without issue on 1 June 1830, at Weymouth, England, aged 59, and was buried four days later in Melcombe Regis, Dorset, England; his wife had died on 29 November 1827. His motto Hic fructis virtutis. His heir was his nephew, Edmund Waller, 4th Baronet, who had been born in 1797.

Baronetage of Ireland
Preceded by Robert Waller	Baronet (of Newport); 1826–1830	Succeeded by Edmund Waller
