= Justice Waller =

Justice Waller may refer to:

- Benjamin Waller (1716–1786), associate justice of the Supreme court of Virginia
- John H. Waller (judge) (born 1937), associate justice of the South Carolina Supreme Court
- Bill Waller Jr. (born 1952), chief justice of the Supreme Court of Mississippi

== See also ==
- Waller C. Caldwell (1849–1924), justice of the Tennessee Supreme Court
- Waller Washington Graves (1860–1928), justice of the Supreme Court of Missouri
