= Waller (given name) =

Waller is a given name. People named Waller:

- Waller Bacon (c. 1669–1734), British lawyer and Whig politician
- Waller Thomas Burns (1858–1917), United States district judge
- Waller C. Caldwell (1849–1924), justice of the Tennessee Supreme Court
- Waller Washington Graves (1860–1928), justice of the Supreme Court of Missouri
- Waller Hobson (1851–1924), Irish Anglican clergyman
- Waller Hugh Paton (1828–1895), Scottish landscape artist
- Waller T. Patton (1835–1863), professor, attorney, and an officer of the Confederate States Army
- Waller Redd Staples (1826–1897), American lawyer, law professor, judge, slave-owner and politician
- Waller Taylor (c. 1775–1826), American military commander, politician
- Waller Rodwell Wright (1775–1826), English barrister, author and diplomat

== See also ==
- Waller (surname)
