= Ruth Waller =

English middle distance runner

Ruth Waller is an English elite middle distance runner who specialises in the 800 and 1500 metres. Originally from Manchester, she ran for McNeese State University in Louisiana, United States, in 2003-4 and other years. Her McNeese highlights were Southland Conference Champion in the 800m indoor and outdoor and the mile indoor.

With her one and a half years left of eligibility after graduating from McNeese State, she ran for Baylor University and achieved All American in the Distance Medley Relay in 2007. In Great Britain she is ranked 3rd all-time in the under 20 years of age 2000m and 3000m Steeplechase in 2003, and ranked third all-time in the indoor mile in 2007.

== Personal Best ==
- 800 metres - 2:08.8 min (2004)
- 1500 metres - 4:24.04 min (2006)
- Mile - 4:48.7 min (2004)
