= Edmund Waller (cricketer) =

English cricketer and British Army officer

Personal information
- Born: 7 December 1838; Bishop's Tachbrook, Warwickshire, England
- Died: 6 February 1871 (aged 32); Pimlico, London, England

Domestic team information
- Years: Team
- 1865: Gentlemen of Kent

Career statistics
Competition	First-class
Matches	1
Runs scored	22
Batting average	11.00
100s/50s	0/0
Top score	16
Catches/stumpings	1/–
- Source: Cricinfo, 27 July 2020

Capt. Edmund Waller (7 December 1838 – 6 February 1871) was an English first-class cricketer and British Army officer.

== Early life and family ==
Waller was born in December 1838 at Bishop's Tachbrook, Warwickshire, the third son of Church of England reverend Ernest Adolphus Waller and grandson of noted eye surgeon Sir Wathen Waller. He was educated at Marlborough College, where he captained the college cricket team.

== Military career ==
From Marlborough he enlisted in the British Army as an ensign in the 7th Royal Fusiliers, before purchasing the rank of lieutenant in July 1858.

In May 1866, he was promoted to captain.

== Cricket ==
Waller made a single appearance in first-class cricket for the Gentlemen of Kent against the Gentlemen of Marylebone Cricket Club at Canterbury in 1865. Batting twice in the match, he was dismissed in the Gentlemen of Kent first innings for 16 runs by Henry Arkwright, while in their second innings he was dismissed for 6 runs by the same bowler.

== Personal life ==
Waller died, unmarried, at Eaton Square in Pimlico on 6 February 1871.
