= George Waller (judge) =

British judge

The Right Honourable Sir George Waller
- Royal coat of arms of the United Kingdom

Lord Justice of Appeal
- In office 1976–1984

High Court Judge
- In office 1965–1976

Personal details
- Born: 3 August 1911
- Died: 5 February 1999 (aged 87)
- Education: Oundle School; Queens' College, Cambridge

Sir George Stanley Waller PC OBE (3 August 1911 – 5 February 1999) was a British Lord Justice of Appeal.

He was educated at Oundle School and Queens' College, Cambridge, and was called to the bar at Gray's Inn in 1934, becoming a Bencher in 1961 and Treasurer in 1978. He was made a QC in 1954, a recorder from 1953 to 1965, and a judge of the High Court of Justice (Queen's Bench Division) from 1965 to 1976. He was a Lord Justice of Appeal from 1976 to 1984. He played rugby union for Cambridge University R.U.F.C., gaining a blue by playing in The Varsity Match in 1932.

His son is Sir Mark Waller.
