= Sir Edmund Waller, 4th Baronet =

British baronet (1797–1851)

Sir Edmund Waller, 4th Baronet (1 July 1797 – 9 March 1851), of Newport, County Tipperary, was the second son of Jocelyn Macartney Waller (1774, Lisbrian, Ireland – 2 December 1828, Canada) and Elizabeth Willis Chapman (1778, County Tipperary, Ireland – 21 April 1842, Quebec, Canada). Elizabeth was the widow of Dr. Cullen M.D.; Jocelyn was the fourth son of the first baronet.

== Life ==
Waller was born on 1 July 1797 in Montreal, Canada. He succeeded to the baronetcy on 1 June 1830, after the death of Sir Charles Townshend Waller, 3rd Baronet.

He died on 9 March 1851 in Brighton, England, aged 53.

== Family ==
Waller married firstly, 28 March 1828, Selina Maria, his cousin, daughter of George Waller, of Prior Park, County Tipperary, Ireland, and Elizabeth daughter of George Studdert, of Kilkishen, County Clare, Ireland. She died childless on 22 July 1840.

He married secondly, 13 June 1844, Rebecca Guinness, sister of Sir Benjamin Lee Guinness, 1st Baronet (1867), fifth daughter of Arthur Guinness of Beaumont, County Dublin, Ireland and Anne, first daughter and coheir of Benjamin Lee. Rebecca, born 13 June 1814 in Ireland, died 22 November 1870 at Brighton, England.

Baronetage of Ireland
Preceded by Charles Townshend Waller	Baronet (of Newport); 1830–1851	Succeeded by Edmund Waller
