= Waller family =

English family

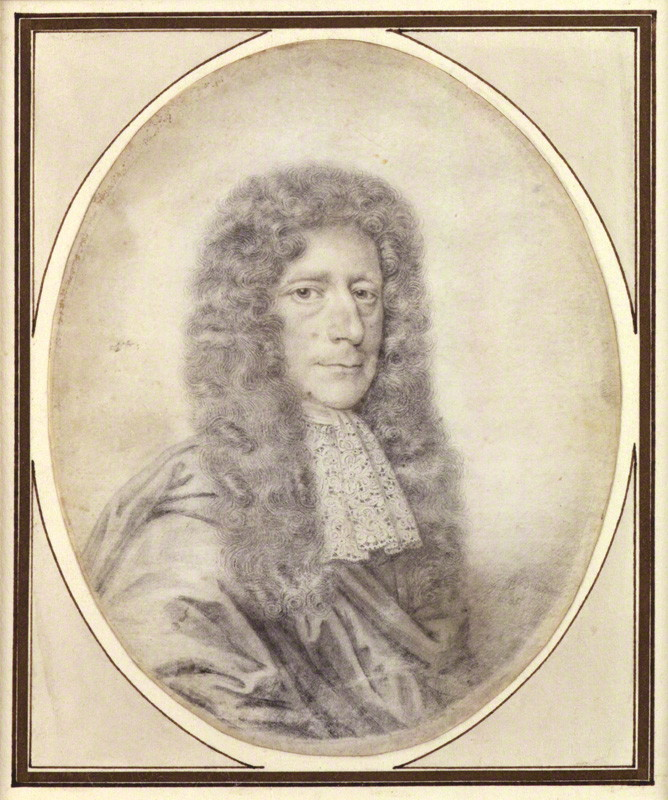
Edmund Waller (the politician-poet), by David Loggon, 1685, National Portrait Gallery.

The Waller family was a Kentish family, of Groombridge Place, that migrated to Hertfordshire and Buckinghamshire in the 14th or 16th century, and then to Gloucestershire, and, for a generation, North Yorkshire.

Several members carried the name Edmund Waller. These Edmund Wallers are listed here father to son or grandson, or uncle to nephew:

- Edmund, of Coleshill, Buckinghamshire, grandfather of the poet;

- Edmund, MP and poet;

- Edmund (1652-dsp Bristol 1699/1700), MP for Amersham 1689–98, educated Christ Church, Oxford and Middle Temple, bencher 1696. Became a Quaker. Married (1686) Abigail Tylney;

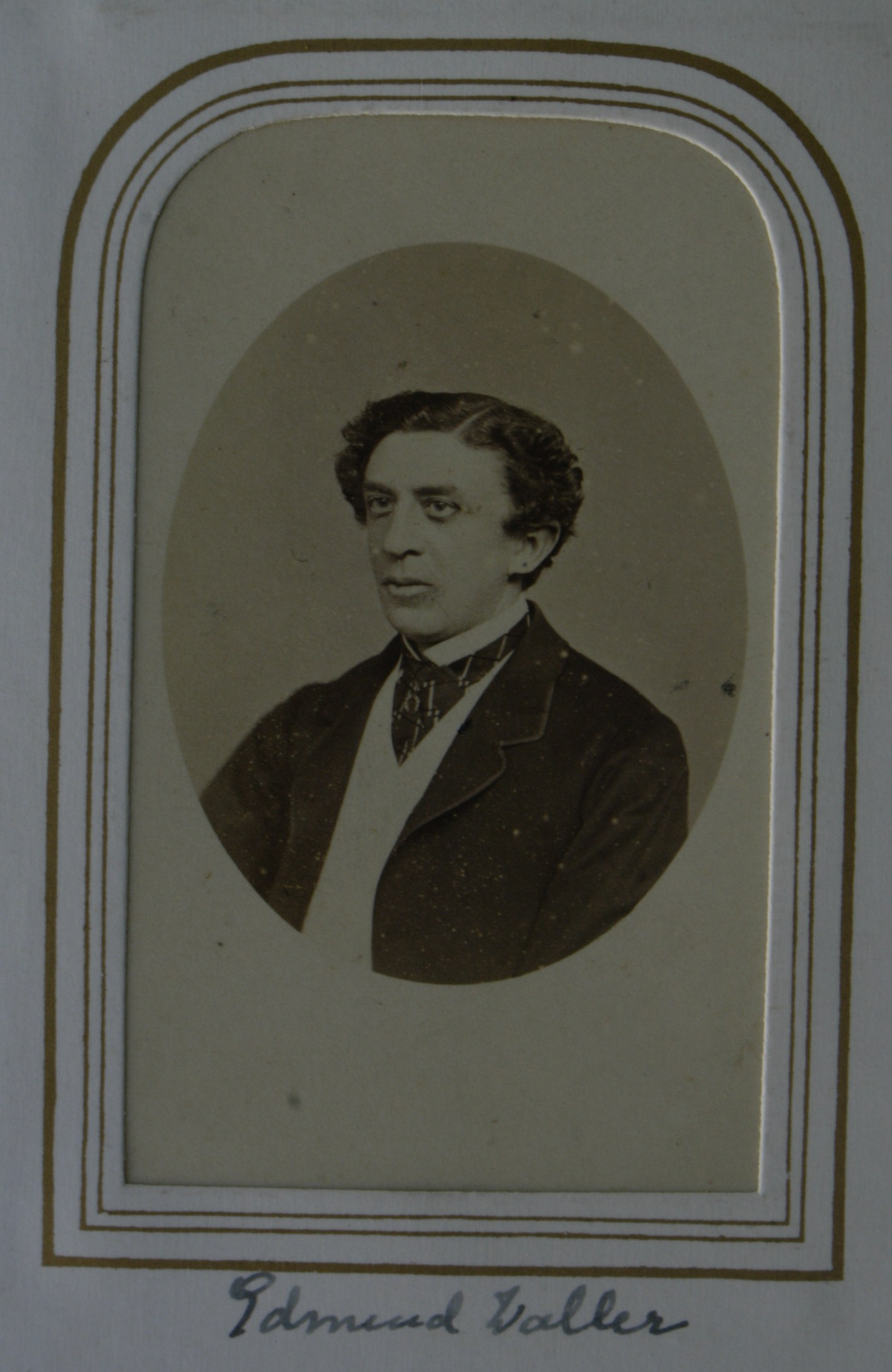
Edmund Waller VI or VII (1828-98), JP, DL

- Edmund (1696–1771), MP for Great Marlow 1722–1741, and Chipping Wycombe 1741–1754, Cofferer of the Household December 1744 – December 1746. Married before 1720, his step-sister, Mary, daughter of John Aislabie, of Studley Royal, Ripon. Succeeded his uncle Edmund Waller in Gloucestershire estates c.1700 (Farmington, Turkdean & Hazleton), and his father in 1707. A step-brother of William Aislabie, MP;

- Edmund (?1725-88), 'took to the bottle', MP for Chipping Wycombe 1747–1754 and late 1757–1761. Master, St. Katherine’s Hospital 1747–88, educated St. Mary Hall, Oxford, and Lincoln's Inn. Married (1755) Martha (d. 8.8.1788), daughter of Rowland Philipps of Orlandon, Pembroke;

- Edmund (1757–1810), lord of the manor of Farmington, left £5,000 stock to provide an income for life for his housekeeper Anna Joynes, and then to benefit the poor of Beaconsfield (Bucks.), Upper Turkdean, and Farmington in bread, clothing, and blankets;

- Edmund (1828-98), JP, DL, High Sheriff Gloucestershire 1876, once of Little Hall Barn, Bucks, and of Farmington Lodge, near Northleach and Kirkby Fleetham, North Riding of Yorkshire (the unentailed later sold 1889). Married (1858) Lucy Georgiana Elwes (died 1878), and then (1880) Emily Mary Young (dsp 1923), she was a great-granddaughter of Sir William Young, 2nd Baronet.

== Descendants of Edmund Waller (1606–1687) ==
Waller's first wife Anne Banks died in childbirth leaving a surviving daughter Elizabeth or Anne (1634-), wife to William Dormer, Dormer the splendid, (died 1683), son of Sir Robert Dormer, Kt. (d.1649), of Ascot Park, Ascott, Stadhampton, Oxfordshire.

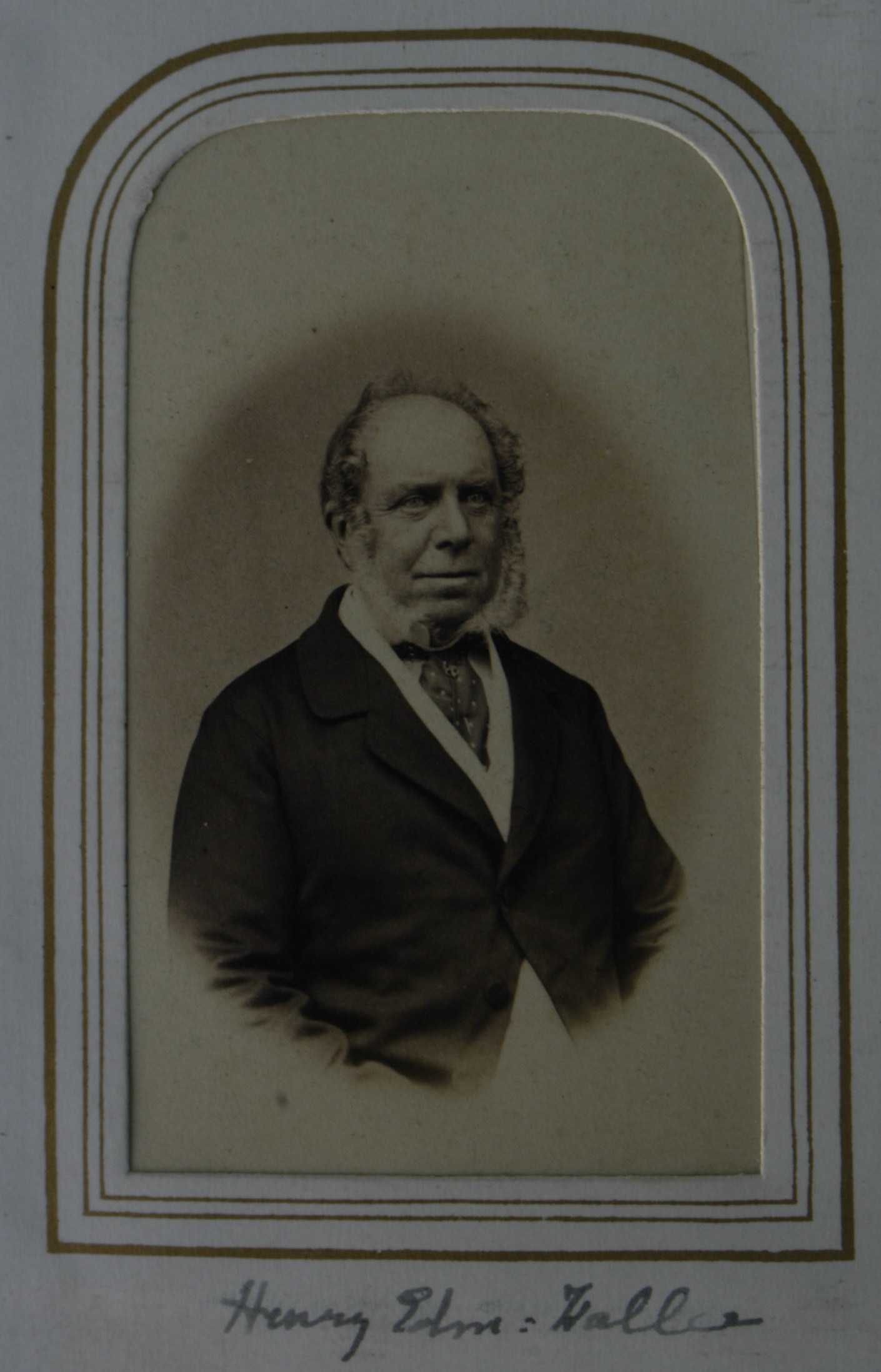
_{Carte de visite of Harry Edmund Waller, JP, DL (1804-69) of Farmington and Kirkby Fleetham.}

He married secondly in 1644 Mary Bracey (d.1677), (or Bressy, Bresse or Breaux), of Thame or possibly of somewhere in France, and went over to Calais, afterwards taking up his residence at Rouen. By Mary Breux he had several children. His descendant Rachel Waller, daughter of Edmund Waller VI or VII, considering the Breux family's connections with Barbadoes wrote in 1939 that: this probably gave rise to the assumption that she was not of pure European blood. In support of this theory, we may compare the portrait of the poet with those of his descendants. In these latter, the long face and aquiline lineaments of the poet have given way to round blunt features and curly black hair. The children included:

- Benjamin, somewhat lacking in his father's wit, he was sent to Jersey, a colony in the West Indies;
- Edmund II or III (1652-1699/1700), MP for Amersham 1689–98, educ. Christ Church, Oxford, Middle Temple bencher 1696. Became a Quaker. Married (1686) Abigail (d. 1689), daughter of Francis Tylney of Rotherwick, Hants, sister of Frederick Tylney (?1653-1725), MP;
- William, a merchant of London;
- Dr. Stephen Waller (1654–1706), of Hall Barn, a doctor of law, a famous civilian, and Commissioner for the Union. His widow, Judith, daughter of Sir Thomas Vernon, MP, Kt., of Farnham, married, as his second wife, John Aislabie, MP, DL (1670–1742).

- Harry Waller (c. 1701–1772)), MP for Chipping Wycombe 1726-47. Deputy master of St. Katherine’s Hospital 1747-1772. Married (1744) Elizabeth, daughter of Sir John Stapylton, 3rd Baronet, M.P.;
- Edmund Waller III or IV, (1699–1771), MP for Great Marlow 1722–1741, and Chipping Wycombe 1741–1754, Cofferer of the Household December 1744- December 1746. Married before 1720, his step-sister, Mary, daughter of John Aislabie, of Studley Royal, Ripon. Succeeded his uncle Edmund Waller, c. 1700, and bought Gloucestershire estates c.1720s (Farmington, Turkdean & Hazleton, and parts of Bourton-on-the-Water, and Clapton), and his father in 1707. A step-brother of William Aislabie, MP;

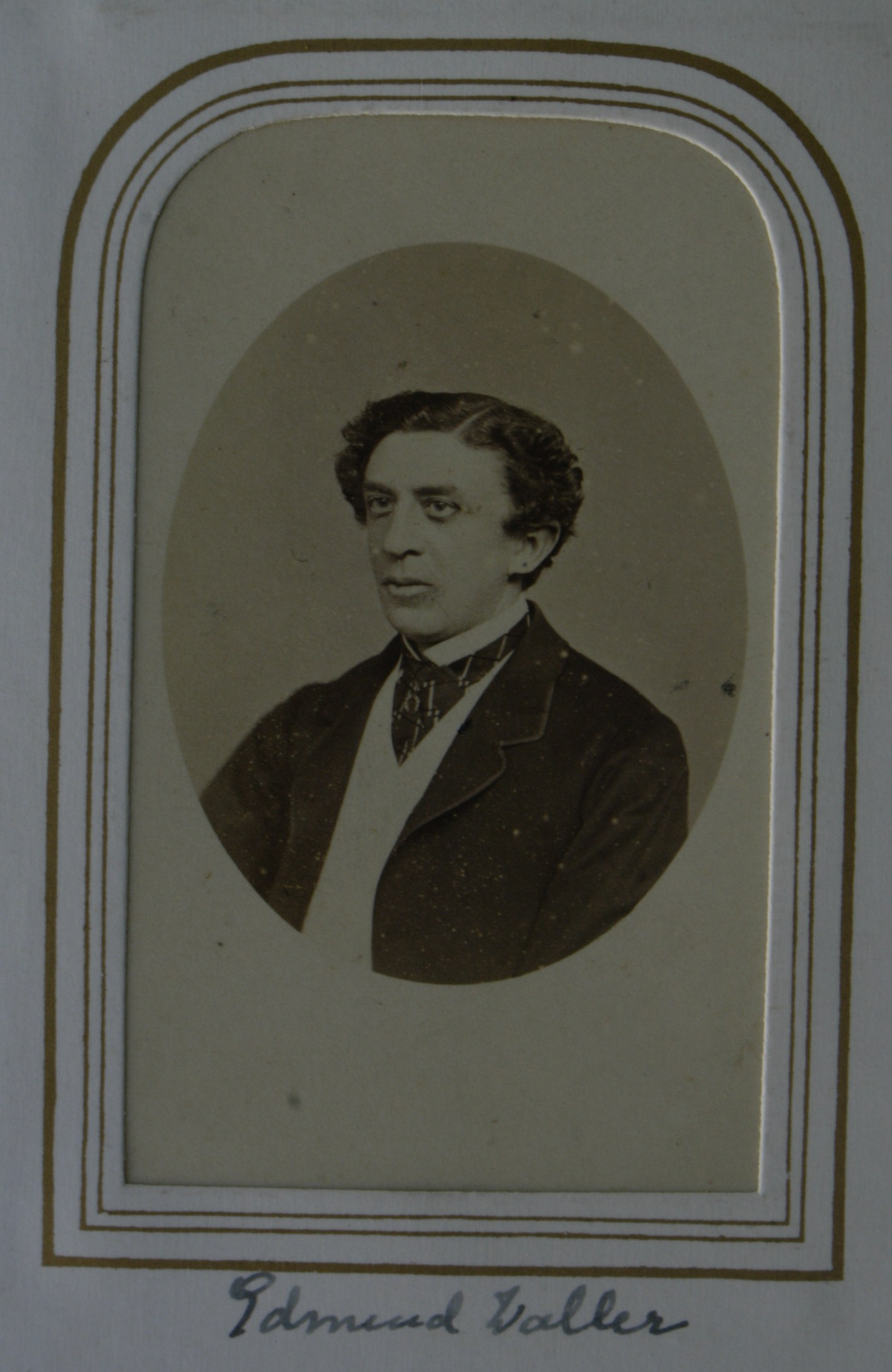
_{Carte de visite photo of Edmund Waller VI or VII (1828-98), of Farmington and Kirkby Fleetham, JP, DL. Eldest brother of Mrs Drysdale.}

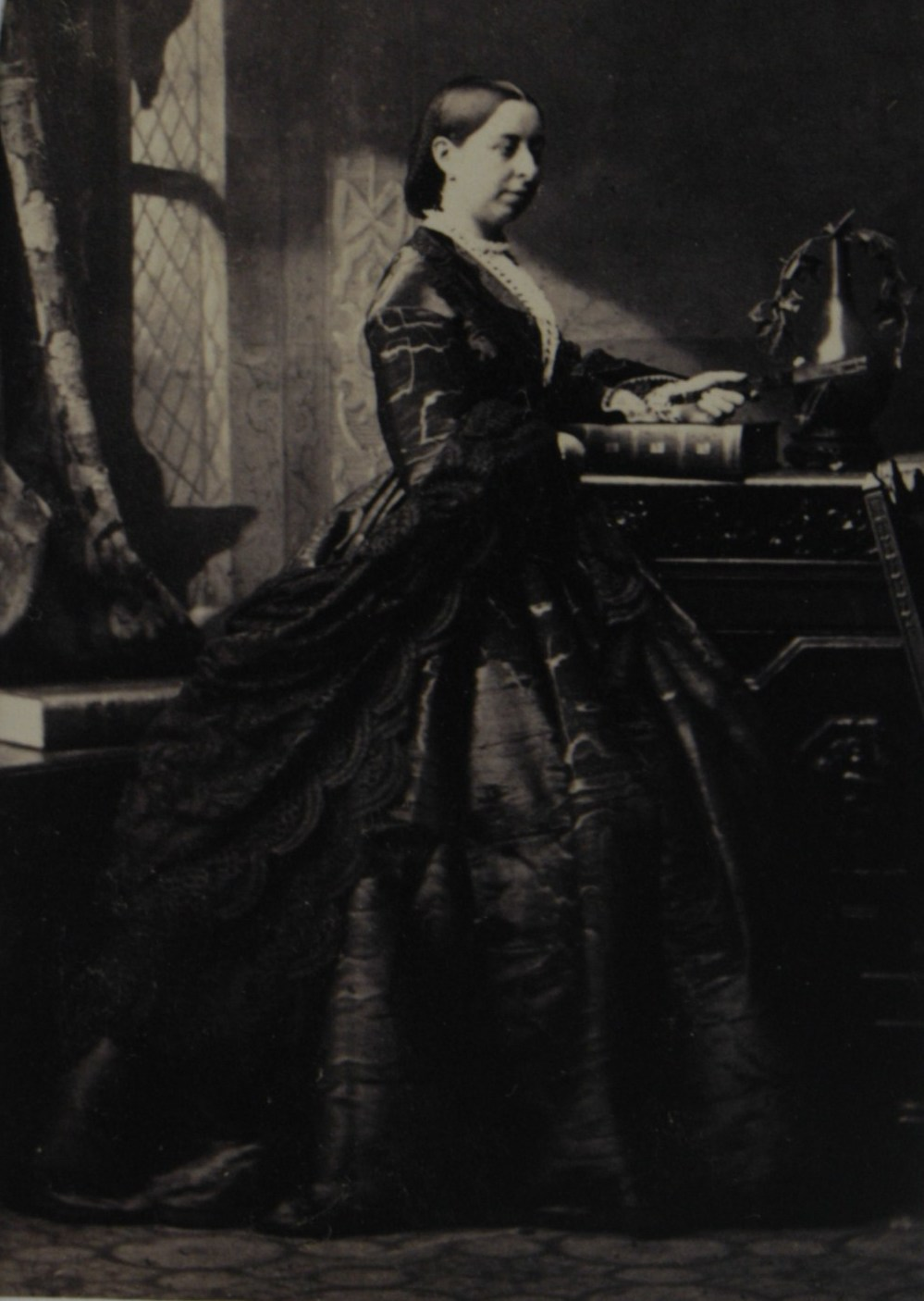
_{Miss Emily Waller (1835–1919), albumen print, 27 June 1862, aka Mrs Edward William Boudier.}

_{Elizabeth Waller (1840–1892), daughter of Harry Edmund Waller, and wife to Colonel Robert Carstairs Drysdale, RA, JP.}

- Edmund Waller IV or V (?1725-88), 'took to the bottle', MP for Chipping Wycombe 1747-1754 and late 1757-1761. Master, St. Katherine’s Hospital 1747–88, educated St. Mary Hall, Oxford, and Lincoln's Inn. Married (1755) Martha (d. 8.8.1788), daughter of Rowland Philipps of Orlandon, Pembroke;
- Anne, married (1738), Sir Miles Stapylton, 4th Bart., MP for Yorkshire, 1734–1750, of Myton, (died 1752), their daughter Anne, d.s.p.

- Rev. Harry Waller (1760–1824), succeeded his brother Edmund in 1810, retired to Boulogne in 1821 (to avoid debt). Married (15.5.1797) Mary/Maria, sister of Rev. John Dolphin (c1775-11.3.1831), curate at Farmington, c1799;

- Harry Edmund Waller, JP, DL (1804-69), sold Hall Barn 1832, inherited Kirkby Fleetham, North Yorkshire and Clint, south of Ripon, from his second-cousin-once-removed Miss Sophia Elizabeth Lawrence (1761–1845) of Studley Royal, in 1845 (she left the bulk of these Aislabie derived estates to her third cousins, the Robinson family). This Waller is said to have won the Ascot Gold Cup of 1852. Married (1826) Caroline-Elizabeth (d. 1.12.1840) daughter of John Larking, of Clare Hall, Lewisham, Kent. He was nominated High Sheriff of Gloucestershire, November 1833;

- Edmund Waller VI or VII (1828-98), JP, DL, High Sheriff Gloucestershire 1876, once of Little Hall Barn, and of Farmington, near Northleach and Kirby Fleetham (the unentailed later sold 1889). Married (1858) Lucy (died 1878), daughter of Henry Elwes of Colesbourne, a grandfather of Henry John Elwes.

- Rachel Waller (1868–1954), only child, married (1889) Cecil Fane De Salis (1857–1948) of Dawley Court, Middlesex;

- Major-General William-Noel Waller, Royal Artillery, (25.12.1831-1909). Married Mary Elizabeth Heygate, and secondly Charlotte Lycester Templer.

- Harry Noel Waller, (India, 19.8.1859-17.1.1944, 306 West End Avenue, New York, aged 84).

- Robert Waller (c1732-1814), MP for Chipping Wycombe 1761-90, educated Oriel College, Oxford, Groom of the bedchamber 1784–1801;

- Margaret, the eldest, born Rouen;
- Mary who married Dr. Peter Birch, Doctor of Divinity, Prebendary and Sub Dean of Westminster Abbey. Died 2 July 1710 aged 65 years;
- Dorothy, a dwarf, sent to the North; Dorothy lived in Morley, near Leeds. She died in 1771 and left her house to the Reverend Timothy Alred, of St Mary's In The Wood. She had a romantic attachment to him. She is buried in the churchyard there. She is reputed to have been carried from her home on Banks Hill to St Mary's in a sedan chair. Her former home is said to be the oldest house in Morley, and has a plaque above the door indicating her residency and her date of passing.
- Eliza, with her brother Edmund, an executor of her father.

== Arms of Waller ==
- Shield: Sable three walnut leaves or between two bendlets argent.
- Crest: On a mount vert a walnut tree proper, on the sinister side an escutcheon pendant charged with the arms of France with a label of three points argent.
- Motto: Hic fructus virtutis Azincourt.
