= Richard Waller (knight) =

Sir Richard Waller
- Born: about 1395; Kent, England
- Died: after 10 May 1461
- Resting place: Speldhurst, Kent, England
- Occupations: Soldier, official
- Spouse: Silvia Gulby
- Parents: John Waller (father); Margaret Landsdale (mother)
- Military service
- Allegiance: England
- Branch: Army
- Battles/wars: Battle of Agincourt; Battle of Verneuil

Sheriff of Surrey and Sussex
- In office 1433–1434

Sheriff of Kent
- In office 1437–1438

Sir Richard Waller was an English soldier and official. His most notable achievement was the capturing of the Duke of Orléans at the Battle of Agincourt, which earned him a knighthood.

== History ==
Richard was born in Groombridge, Kent around the year 1395. His father was John Waller and his mother was Margaret Waller (née Landsdale). His mother was originally from Sussex and his grandfather, Thomas Waller, also hailed from Sussex.

Richard served in the English army under Henry V during the Hundred Years' War. He fought in the Battle of Agincourt in 1415, where he captured Charles d'Orléans, the Duke of Orléans. He was knighted on the battlefield for his actions by his king. Richard also fought in the Battle of Verneuil.

After his military service, Richard served as an official. He served as sheriff of Surrey and Sussex from 1433 until the following year; additionally, he was made sheriff of Kent in 1437 and again only remained in office until the following year.

== Family ==
He had seven sons and 2 daughters with his wife Silvia: two sons named Richard and John, a daughter named Alice and a daughter named Ann. His son John became a member of Parliament for Hindon.
