= Waller Washington Graves =

American judge (1860–1928)

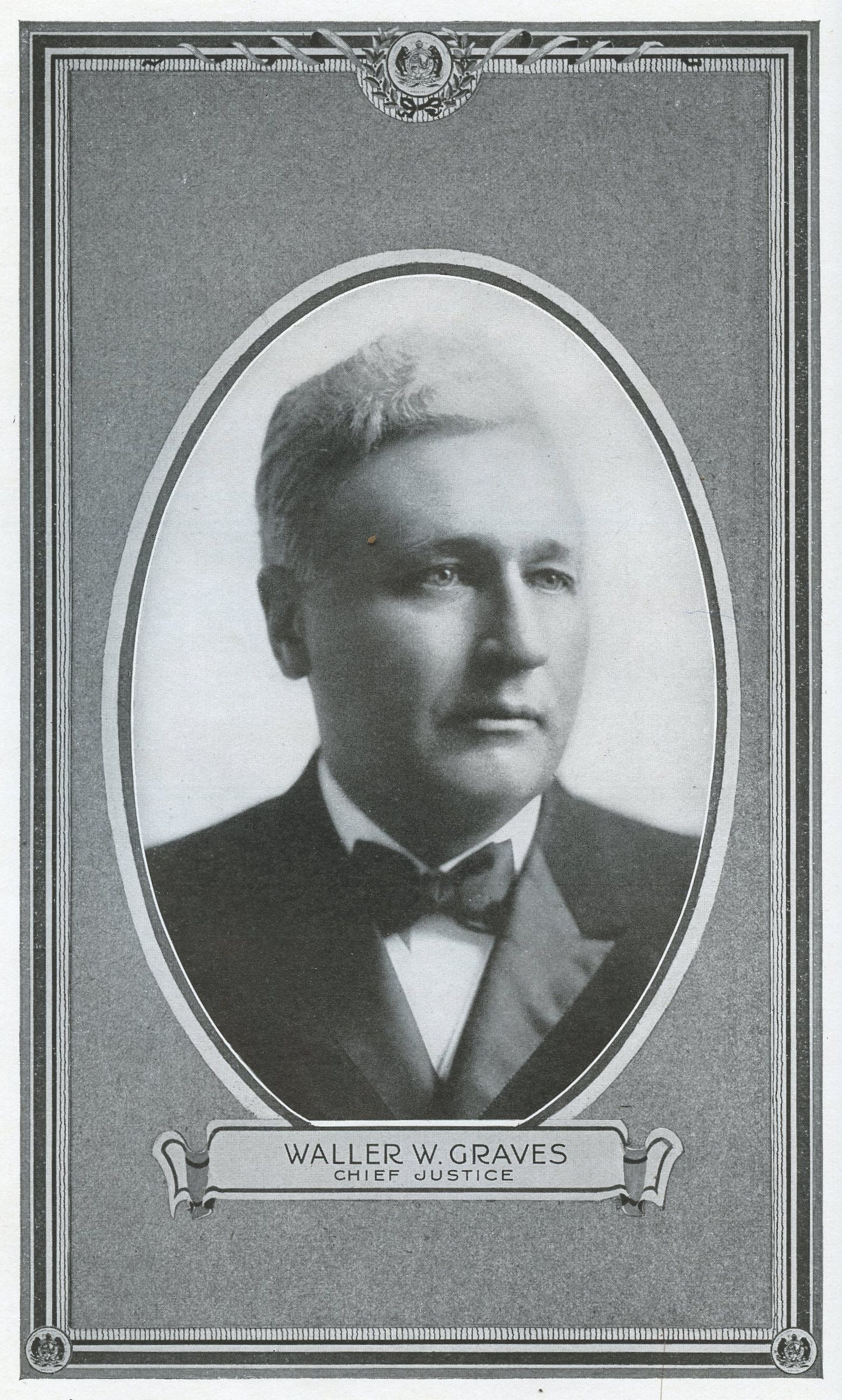

Waller Washington Graves (December 17, 1860 – June 17, 1928) was a justice of the Supreme Court of Missouri from 1906 to 1928.

== Early life, education, and career ==
Born in Lafayette County, Missouri, Graves attended the local schools and the University of Missouri. He gained admission to the bar in 1885, and practiced in Butler, Missouri. Beginning in 1893, he practiced as the partner of Harvey C. Clark. Graves was elected as a circuit court judge in 1899.

== Supreme court service ==
In April 1906, Governor Joseph W. Folk appointed Graves to a seat on the state supreme court vacated by the resignation of Justice William Champe Marshall. Graves won election to the seat later that year, and was reelected to a ten-year term in 1908. Following the death of Joseph Rucker Lamar in 1916, Graves was reported to be among the candidates being considered by President Woodrow Wilson to fill Lamar's seat on the Supreme Court of the United States, though Wilson ultimately nominated Louis Brandeis. Graves was again reelected to the Missouri Supreme Court in 1918, and ran unopposed in the primary for reelection in 1928, but died before the general election that year.

== Personal life and death ==
On June 30, 1892, Graves married Alice Ludwick, with whom he had three sons who survived him.

Graves died of pneumonia in his home in Jefferson City, Missouri, at the age of 67.

Political offices
Preceded by William Champe Marshall	Justice of the Missouri Supreme Court; 1906–1928	Succeeded by William Francis Frank
