= Waller baronets =

Set index for Waller baronets

There have been two baronetcies created for persons with the surname Waller, one in the Baronetage of Ireland and one in the Baronetage of the United Kingdom. One creation is extant as of 2026.

- Waller baronets of Newport (1780)
- Waller baronets of Braywick Lodge (1815)
