= Divisional court (England and Wales) =

A divisional court, in relation to the High Court of Justice of England and Wales, means a court sitting with at least two judges. Matters heard by a divisional court include some criminal cases in the High Court (including appeals from magistrates' courts and in extradition proceedings) as well as certain judicial review cases. Although often referred to in practice as the Divisional Court, a divisional court is in fact not a separate court or division of the High Court but essentially refers to the number of judges sitting. Usually a divisional court sits with two judges but occasionally the bench comprises three judges.

The best known divisional court is that of the Administrative Court, which is a specialist court in the King's Bench Division which deals with judicial review claims, some criminal appeals (including by case stated) and writs of habeas corpus. There are also divisional courts of the Family and Chancery Divisions to deal with certain cases.

The usual constitution of a divisional court is one Lord Justice of Appeal and one High Court judge, in comparison to other sittings of the High Court which are usually before a single High Court judge.

== See also ==
- Full court
