= Mark Waller (judge) =

British Lord Justice of Appeal

Sir George Mark Waller PC (born 13 October 1940) is a former Lord Justice of Appeal who served as the Vice-President of the Civil Division of the Court of Appeal of England and Wales.

The son of the Rt Hon Sir George Waller, he was educated at Oundle School and read law at King's College, Durham (now Newcastle University) before being called to the Bar in 1964 and is a Bencher at Gray's Inn. He became a Queen's Counsel in 1979, and was served as a Recorder from 1986 to 1989. He was appointed to the Queen's Bench Division of the High Court of Justice on 25 May 1989, being awarded the customary knighthood, and served until 1996.

He was Presiding Judge of the North Eastern Circuit from 1992 to 1995. He was appointed to the Court of Appeal on 1 October 1996, and appointed a Privy Counsellor at that time. He served as Chairman of the Judicial Studies Board from 1999 to 2003, and has served as President of the Council of Inns of Court and the Bar since 2003. He was Vice-President of the Court of Appeal's Civil Division from 2006 to 2010, when he retired from the bench.

He was appointed as Intelligence Services Commissioner from 1 January 2011, and this appointment was renewed for a further 3 years from 1 January 2014.

== Personal ==
Waller and his wife, Rachel, created the Charlie Waller Memorial Trust after their son took his own life while suffering from depression. Their aim is to increase awareness of depressive illnesses, especially among young people.

He is a supporter of Newcastle United and a member of the Garrick Club.
